= List of Christmas films =

Trends in Christmas films over nearly a century (1925–2022)

Many Christmas stories have been adapted to feature films and TV specials, and have been broadcast and repeated many times on television. Since the popularization of home video in the 1980s, these films are sold and re-sold every year during the holiday shopping season. Many television networks, film studios, and production companies, such as cable television channels Hallmark and Lifetime, produce and release new Christmas-themed films every year during or around December, all with variations of similar plots and themes. Additionally, films revolving around the Nativity story of Christmas are regularly produced such as The Nativity Story (2006) and The Star (2017).

One film that has become the flashpoint for "Is this a Christmas movie or not?" debates is Die Hard (1988), with some viewing the film as a Christmas movie intertwined with an action genre setting or a film that is simply set around the Christmas and holiday season.

== Theatrical films ==
Christmas-themed feature films that received a theatrical release.

Title	Year	Description
3 Godfathers	1948	At Christmastime in the Old West, three outlaws find a woman dying in childbirth, and deliver the baby to civilization in a retelling of The Three Wise Men.
The 3 Wise Men	2003	A Spanish animated film, telling the story of the journey of the Three Wise Men. Released in Spain as Los Reyes Magos
About a Boy	2002	A carefree bachelor (Hugh Grant) sees his life transformed during the holiday season by an unlikely friendship with the son of a single mother.
All I Want for Christmas	1991	A brother and sister attempt to bring their divorced parents back together for Christmas.
All Is Bright	2013	While out of prison on parole, a man reluctantly takes a job selling Christmas trees with his old buddy to make enough money to buy his estranged daughter the piano she has always wanted.
Almost Christmas	2016	A dysfunctional family gathers together for their first Christmas since their mom died.
Alvin and the Chipmunks	2007	Three musical chipmunks are discovered by an aspiring songwriter who wants to use their amazing singing abilities to become famous.
Annie	1999	Annie, an orphan living under the tyrannical thumb of Miss Hannigan, gets lucky when she is selected to stay at the residence of billionaire Oliver Warbucks.
The Apartment	1960	Set during the Christmas period. A man lends his apartment to his company bosses to use for extramarital affairs in exchange for promotion and other benefits. One of the women involved with his senior boss is a woman he has had a crush on for some time and he must decide between protecting this woman and the advancement of his career.
Arthur Christmas	2011	An Aardman Animations and Sony Pictures Animation film, where Santa's youngest son Arthur must deliver a bicycle to an overlooked Gwen Hines before Christmas morning dawns.
Babes in Toyland	1934	A Laurel and Hardy version of Victor Herbert's popular 1903 operetta Babes in Toyland.
Babes in Toyland	1961	A Disney film, where it interpreted the Christmas tale about the residents of Toyland in Technicolor.
Bachelor Mother	1939	Set during the Christmas period, a woman accidentally stumbles upon an abandoned baby on the steps of an orphanage and accepts an offer to take responsibility for the child in return for a job.
A Bad Moms Christmas	2017	Three moms (Mila Kunis, Kristen Bell, and Kathryn Hahn) deal with their own mothers (Christine Baranski, Cheryl Hines, and Susan Sarandon) visiting during the Christmas holiday.
Bad Santa	2003	The crotchety Willie T. Soke (Billy Bob Thornton) and his partner (Tony Cox) reunite once a year for a holiday con. Posing as a mall Santa and his elf, they rip off shopping outlets on Christmas Eve. This year, however, Willie is falling apart. Depressed and alcoholic, his erratic behavior draws the suspicion of mall security (Bernie Mac). But after befriending a small boy, a different side comes out and Willie begins to wonder if there's still hope for him.
Bad Santa 2	2016	Fueled by cheap whiskey, greed, and hatred, Willie Soke (Billy Bob Thornton) teams up with his angry little sidekick, Marcus, to knock off a Chicago charity on Christmas Eve. Along for the ride is chubby and cheery Thurman Merman, a 250-pound ray of sunshine who brings out Willie's sliver of humanity. Mommy issues arise when the pair are joined by Willie's horror story of a mother, Sunny Soke, who raises the bar for the gang's ambitions, while somehow lowering the standards of criminal behavior.
Bada Din	1998	An Indian romantic-drama film about troubles faced by a couple during Christmas Day.
Believe	2016	A business owner struggles between his desire for financial success and the responsibility of funding the annual Christmas pageant.
Bell, Book and Candle	1958	A modern-day witch likes her neighbor but despises his fiancée, so she enchants him to love her and spend Christmas with her.
The Bells of St. Mary's	1945	A priest and a nun who have a friendly rivalry must try to save their school from being shut down.
The Best Christmas Pageant Ever	2024	A group of juvenile delinquents star in a Christmas pageant.
The Best Man Holiday	2013	Nearly 15 years after they were last together, a group of college friends reunite over the Christmas holidays. Though much has changed in their lives, the friends discover just how easy it is for long-forgotten rivalries and passionate romances to be reignited.
Beyond Tomorrow	1940	The ghosts of three elderly industrialists killed in an airplane crash return to Earth to help reunite a young couple they initially brought together.
The Bishop's Wife	1947	An angel helps a bishop to change his life and save his marriage before Christmas.
Black Nativity	2013	A street-wise teen from Baltimore who has been raised by a single mother travels to New York City to spend the Christmas holiday with his estranged relatives.
Blackjack	1990	A Swedish drama-comedy film set during Christmas. After returning from Stockholm to her hometown, a young unmarried mother's only escape is the local Saturday night dance. She is invited to join a group, who are part of the band, named Blackjack, playing at the nightclub.
Blizzard	2003	When a ten-year-old girl's best friend moves out of town, a young reindeer called Blizzard comforts her.
The Blue Bird	1940	Mytyl and her brother Tyltyl, a woodchopper's children, are led by the Fairy Berylune on a magical trip through the past, present, and future to locate the Blue Bird of Happiness.
The Boss Baby: Family Business	2021	Now adults, brothers Tim and Ted reunite and become kids again for 48 hours when Tim realizes one of his daughters named Tina is a secret agent and they must team up to prevent an evil genius from turning fellow toddlers into monstrous brats.
Boxing Day	2021	A British author living in America, returns home to London for Christmas to introduce his American fiancée to his eccentric British-Caribbean family.
Bright Eyes	1934	An orphaned girl is taken in by a snobbish family at the insistence of their rich, crotchety uncle, even as her devoted aviator godfather fights for custody. The film is set over Christmas.
Bundle of Joy	1956	A remake of the 1939 film, Bachelor Mother. Set during the Christmas period, a woman stumbles upon an abandoned baby on the steps of an orphanage and accepts an offer to take responsibility for the child in return for a job.
Carol	2015	An aspiring photographer develops an intimate relationship with an older woman over the Christmas holidays in 1950s New York.
The Cheaters	1945	A Screwball comedy film set around Christmas. A New York City businessman is on the verge of bankruptcy and is relying upon his dying uncle's fortune, only for him to find out that it has been left to an actress. Meanwhile, his wife and daughter convince him to invite a poor and destitute man to spend Christmas with the family as a way to appear generous. The destitute man turns out to know of the actress.
The Christmas Candle	2013	In 1890, an English village copes with the disappearance of a supposedly miraculous candle. Based on the novel by Max Lucado.
The Christmas Chronicles	2018	The story of sister and brother, Kate and Teddy Pierce, whose Christmas Eve plan to catch Santa Claus on camera turns into an unexpected journey that most kids could only dream about.
The Christmas Chronicles 2	2020	A couple of two years later, Kate Pierce and Jack Booker help Santa Claus save the North Pole from Belsnickel.
The Christmas Classic	2023	A woman returns to her hometown during Christmastime to convince her ex-boyfriend to sell his ski resort to her boss that's also her future father-in-law.
Christmas Eve	1947	To save her fortune from a designing nephew, Matilda Reid must locate her three long-lost adopted sons in time for a Christmas Eve reunion.
Christmas Holiday	1944	On Christmas Eve, a New Orleans nightclub singer tells a soldier the tragic tale of her marriage to a Creole scoundrel.
Christmas in Connecticut	1945	A food writer must entertain her boss and a returning war hero for the holidays.
The Christmas Kid	1967	A corrupt sheriff, who was born on Christmas Day, decides to change his ways and go against the most powerful man in town.
Christmas Present	1986	An Italian film about a group of former friends that meet again after a very long time, on Christmas Eve, with the intent of ripping off a rich industrialist in a game of poker.
Christmas Rathri	1961	An Indian drama film with the climax and pivotal plot resolution taking place on Christmas Eve.
Christmas Rematch	2004	A sequel to 1984 film, Christmas Present. An Italian film about a group of former friends that meet again on Christmas Eve for a rematch of a poker game that took part many years ago, with some planning to settle scores.
A Christmas Story	1983	Ralphie has to convince his parents, teacher, and Santa that a Red Ryder B.B. gun really is the perfect gift.
A Christmas Tale (Un Conte de Noël)	2008	The troubled Vuillard family is no stranger to illness, grief, and banishment, but when their matriarch requires a bone-marrow transplant, the estranged clan reunites just in time for Christmas.
The Christmas That Almost Wasn't	1966	Santa must get a job as a department store Santa so that he can pay his rent and avoid eviction.
The Christmas Tree	1969	A French American millionaire (William Holden), his girlfriend (Virna Lisi) and his war buddy (Andre Bourvil) try to grant his dying son's every wish.
Christmas with the Kranks	2004	Finally alone for the holidays, Luther (Tim Allen) and Nora Krank (Jamie Lee Curtis) plan to eschew the Christmas traditions and take a cruise in the Caribbean instead. This doesn't sit well with their Christmas-obsessed neighbors Vic Frohmeyer (Dan Aykroyd) and Walt Scheel (M. Emmet Walsh), who are determined to win the annual "best-decorated street" competition, and the Kranks soon find themselves social outcasts because of their lack of Christmas spirit.
Christmess	2023	Three recovering addicts try to get through the festive season without relapsing, in Campbelltown, a suburb in Greater Western Sydney, Australia.
Comfort and Joy	1984	During Christmas, A Scottish DJ grappling with personal problems is landed with a whole lot more when he becomes involved in a bitter, territorial feud between two rival families of ice cream sellers.
Cover Up	1949	A film noir set during the Christmas period. An insurance investigator arrives to look into an apparent suicide, but all clues lead him to suspect murder.
Crackers	1998	An Australian comedy film, where a family reunites with their grandfather at a beach house.
The Crowded Day	1954	Within the last five days of Christmas shopping, the lives of five female department store employees intertwine as they confront various personal problems during the busy Christmas season. The film was also titled Shop Spoiled in the US.
Cup of Cheer	2020	A comedy film parodying Hallmark Channel Christmas television films, in which a journalist returns to her hometown for Christmas and falls in love with the owner of a hot chocolate shop.
Daddy's Home 2	2017	A father, stepfather Dusty and Brad plan a together Christmas for the kids with a little help from their real fathers.
Deck the Halls	2006	A rivalry is set between neighbors when one of them decides to light his house up so it can be seen from outer space.
Desk Set	1957	A romantic comedy based on the relationship between a research librarian in a corporate office and a computer scientist brought in to automate her department, and which she perceives as a threat to her job. All things come to a head at Christmastime.
Diary of a Wimpy Kid Christmas: Cabin Fever	2023	Based on Diary of a Wimpy Kid: Cabin Fever, a novel by Jeff Kinney
Diner	1982	Six 20-somethings convene during Christmas break in 1959 Baltimore. Directed by Barry Levinson.
Dr. Seuss' How the Grinch Stole Christmas	2000	A live-action film of the Dr. Seuss story of how a green, hapless creature who plans on destroying Christmas in Whoville because of a childhood trauma with his dog Max and a little girl named Cindy-Lou Who who attempts to bring Christmas spirit into him.
Edward Scissorhands	1990	Edward, a boy found living alone in a dark mansion on the top of a mountain. Edward is the creation of an elderly inventor who dies before he can replace Edward's scissorhands with conventional hands.
Eight Crazy Nights	2002	On Hannukah, an aging basketball referee takes an alcoholic named Davey under his wing, when he keeps breaking the law around town and a judge convinces him to do community service.
Elf	2003	A happy-go-lucky man raised as an elf in the North Pole searches and finds his father in New York City.
Elf Me	2023	A North Pole elf teams up with a young boy who is being bullied.
Elliot the Littlest Reindeer	2018	Elliot, a miniature pony, wishes to compete in the North Pole Tryouts to become one of Santa's reindeer.
Ernest Saves Christmas	1988	Bumbling cab driver Ernest meets a runaway teenage girl and helps Santa Claus as he searches for his successor.
Eyes Wide Shut	1999	A New York City doctor embarks on a night-long erotic adventure in this Christmas thriller.
The Family Man	2000	A wealthy bachelor wakes up on Christmas to find that he has been transported to an alternate reality where he is a mere tire salesman, with a wife and kids. He is living in a middle-class suburban neighborhood.
The Family Plan 2	2025	All Dan wants for Christmas is quality time with his kids. But when he learns his daughter has her own plans, he books a family trip to London ― putting them all in the crosshairs of an unexpected enemy.
The Family Stone	2005	An uptight woman meets her fiancé's free-spirited family for the first time over the Christmas holidays and chaos ensues.
Feast of the Seven Fishes	2018	Set during Christmas Eve, an Italian American family is preparing for the annual Italian tradition known as Feast of the Seven Fishes.
Female Trouble	1974	When a spoiled schoolgirl runs away from home, she gets pregnant while hitch-hiking and goes into a life of crime.
The Fitzgerald Family Christmas	2012	Twenty years after walking out on his family, an estranged father wants to spend his last Christmas with them. The seven adult siblings of the Fitzgerald family must prepare for his return home.
Fitzwilly	1967	A butler helps finance his employer's charitable activities through a variety of illicit schemes, including a plan to rob Gimbels department store on Christmas Eve.
Four Christmases	2008	A couple struggles to visit all four of their divorced parents on Christmas Day.
Fred Claus	2007	Of the two Claus brothers, Fred (Vince Vaughn) is the troublemaker and polar opposite of his saintly sibling, Nicholas (Paul Giamatti). When Fred's criminal ways finally land him in big trouble, Nicholas bails him out and brings him to the North Pole to work off the debt by making toys. The headaches mount for St. Nick, who not only must deal with his troublemaking brother, but also an efficiency expert who has come to evaluate Santa's operation.
Friday After Next	2002	Craig and his goofy, fast-talking cousin, Day-Day, get security guard jobs and go after a fake Santa who robbed their house on Christmas Eve.
Funny Farm	1988	Andy and Elizabeth Farmer move from New York City to the country. Hijinx ensue that stresses their marriage, and they think about divorce and try and sell the house. They ask the towns people to act out a perfect small town Christmas to help sway the potential buyers to a quick sale.
Get Santa	2014	After Santa Claus is arrested and jailed, a recently paroled prisoner and his young son attempt to save Christmas before it's too late.
A Gift from Bob	2020	Sequel to the 2016 film A Street Cat Named Bob. A homeless busker living rough on the streets of London finds himself the target of an animal welfare investigation that threatens to take away his beloved cat and best friend Bob at Christmas time. Also promoted as A Christmas Gift from Bob.
Go	1999	Set during the Christmas period, a shop girl working overtime at her supermarket job to avoid being evicted, is mixed up in a drug sting, which was intended for her absent co-worker.
Going My Way	1944	Bing Crosby as a new young priest taking over a parish from an established old veteran. Adeline De Walt Reynolds was memorable in the last scene as Mother Fitzgibbon, who travels from Ireland to the United States to see her son.
Good Sam	1948	A man who is helpful to others at the expense of his own family puts himself and his family on the brink of homelessness during the Christmas season.
The Great Rupert	1950	A squirrel accidentally helps two dysfunctional families during Christmas.
The Grinch	2018	An animated film of the Dr. Seuss story about the lonely, curmudgeon Grinch who cannot stand Christmas and wants nothing to do with it and plans on ruining the big holiday. Cindy-Lou Who and her friends have plans on meeting and capturing Santa Claus.
The Holdovers	2023	During Christmas in 1970, a curmudgeonly history teacher at a New England prep school is forced to chaperone the handful of students with nowhere to go over Christmas break.
Holidate	2020	Fed up with being single on holidays, two strangers agree to be each other's platonic plus-ones all year long, only to catch real feelings along the way.
The Holiday	2006	Two women swap homes at Christmas after bad breakups with their boyfriends. Each woman finds romance and romantic comedy ensues, Starring Kate Winslet, Cameron Diaz, Jude Law and Jack Black.
Holiday Affair	1949	A fired sales clerk and a young woman fall in love.
Holiday Inn	1942	A film which introduced the song "White Christmas".
The Holly and the Ivy	1952	An English country vicar hosts his estranged adult children for Christmas.
Home Alone	1990	A young boy is forgotten when his large family rushes to catch a plane for Paris at Christmas and battles a pair of bumbling bandits.
Home Alone 2: Lost in New York	1992	After youth Kevin McCallister (Macaulay Culkin) loses track of his father at the airport, he mistakenly gets on a plane headed for New York City—while the rest of the McCallisters fly to Florida. Now alone in the Big Apple, Kevin cons his way into a room at the Plaza Hotel and begins his usual antics. But when Kevin discovers that the Sticky Bandits (Joe Pesci, Daniel Stern) are on the loose, he struggles to stop them from robbing an elderly man's toy store just before Christmas.
Home for Christmas	2010	Set in the small Norwegian town of Skogli, this film looks at those who are desperately trying to (re)connect with their families.
How About You	2007	Ellie acts as caretaker for her sister's retirement home during the holidays, when four malcontents are the only remaining residents. She turns them around by breaking all the rules and organizes a traditional Christmas feast.
How the Toys Saved Christmas	1996	The story follows some toys as they struggle to avoid the heartless Mr. Grimm, that plans to auction off the toys to the highest bidder, and to find their true homes.
The Ice Harvest	2005	A shady lawyer attempts a Christmas Eve crime, hoping to swindle the local mob out of some money.
I'll Be Home for Christmas	1998	A son in college has not been home since his mother died and his father remarried. His father offers his vintage car if he is home by a certain time for Christmas.
I'll Be Seeing You	1944	A traumatized soldier and a woman on a break from serving her prison sentence meet and fall in love during Christmas in this drama set during World War II.
It Happened on 5th Avenue	1947	A hobo who occupies a vacant New York City mansion for the winter unknowingly gets involved with the owner's family.
It's a Wonderful Life	1946	A businessman is shown by his guardian angel on Christmas Eve what the world would be like if he were never born.
Jack Frost	1998	A father passes away, but comes back to life in the form of a snowman, and only his son knows his secret.
Jingle All the Way	1996	A dad competes with a postal worker to get a sold out hot toy for his son.
Journey to Bethlehem	2023	A musical film based about Mary and Saint Joseph's journey to Bethlehem and the birth of Jesus.
Journey to the Christmas star	1976	A Norwegian fairy-tale adventure film about a young girl who disappears followed by the Christmas star, and her parents try to find her and restore the power of the star.
Joyeux Noël	2005	A film set around the informal Christmas truce on the Western Front during Christmas 1914.
Just Friends	2005	While visiting his hometown during Christmas, a man (Ryan Reynolds) comes face-to-face with his old high school crush whom he was best friends with – a woman (Amy Smart) whose rejection of him turned him into a ferocious womanizer.
The King of Kings	2025	Charles Dickens tells the story of Jesus Christ to his son.
Klaus	2019	A simple act of kindness always sparks another, even in a frozen, faraway place. When Smeerensburg's new postman, Jesper, befriends toymaker Klaus, their gifts melt an age-old feud and deliver a sleigh full of holiday traditions.
Lady in the Lake	1947	Private detective Philip Marlowe gets mixed up in a case involving a missing wife and murder at Christmas time.
Last Christmas	2019	A depressed young woman who works in a Christmas supplies store keeps bumping into the same young man.
Last Holiday	2006	Georgia is a humble department store assistant who is told that she has a rare brain condition and only has a few weeks to live. She promptly decides to spend her remaining funds on a luxury holiday in Europe before she dies.
The Lemon Drop Kid	1951	A racetrack tout has a month to pay back the money a gangster lost on a touted horse just before Christmas. The film popularized the song "Silver Bells".
Less than Zero	1987	A college freshman returns home at Christmas time to find that all his high school friends are taking drugs.
The Lion in Winter	1968	Christmas 1183 is the setting for palace intrigues with Henry II of England and family.
The Little Match Girl	1928	French film of Hans Christian Andersen's story of the same name. The story of a frozen girl who tries to sell matches during Christmas and dreams about a toy store.
Look Who's Talking Now!	1993	In the third film of the Look Who's Talking franchise, two pets are given away and are left as strays.
Love Actually	2003	Ten separate stories with different aspects of love counting down five weeks before Christmas. Among the characters explored are David (Hugh Grant), the handsome newly elected British prime minister who falls for a young junior staffer (Martine McCutcheon), Sarah (Laura Linney), a graphic designer whose devotion to her mentally ill brother complicates her love life, and Harry (Alan Rickman), a married man tempted by his attractive new secretary.
Love Affair	1939	A year-long romance between a French painter and an American songbird culminates in a dramatic Christmas Day revelation.
Love the Coopers	2015	When four generations of the Cooper clan come together for their annual Christmas Eve celebration, a series of unexpected visitors and unlikely events turn the night upside down, leading them all toward a surprising rediscovery of family bonds and the spirit of the holiday.
A Madea Christmas	2013	Madea (Tyler Perry) dispenses her unique form of holiday spirit on a rural town when she is coaxed into helping a friend pay her daughter a surprise visit in the country for Christmas.
The Man Who Came to Dinner	1942	Based on the 1939 play of the same name by Moss Hart and George S. Kaufman. While on a speaking tour in Ohio, a famous opinionated and arrogant radio personality injures himself slipping on ice and becomes an unexpected houseguest for a prominent family over the Christmas holidays.
The Man Who Invented Christmas	2017	In 1843, author Charles Dickens sets out to write and self-publish a novel that he hopes will revive his career. He spends the next six weeks bringing Ebenezer Scrooge, Tiny Tim, and other characters to life in A Christmas Carol.
Meet John Doe	1941	A homeless man is hired by an ambitious newspaper columnist as part of a stunt that says he will commit suicide on Christmas Eve in protest of society's ills. Unbeknownst to the columnist, the paper's wealthy owner aims to take advantage of this plot for his own political campaigns
Meet Me in St. Louis	1944	With the activities of the Smith family during 1903, Alonzo Smith (Leon Ames), a lawyer, might need to move the family to New York. Judy Garland introduced the song "Have Yourself a Merry Little Christmas".
Merry Christmas	2000	An Argentine-Italian anthology film set during Christmas Eve. Each of the characters within the several stories overlap with each other. Released in Non-English speaking countries as Felicidades.
Merry Christmas... Happy New Year	1989	An Italian film about an elderly couple who must leave their home, during the Christmas period, as they are unable to pay their rent. Each of their two daughters can only accommodate one parent and therefore the elderly couple are forced to separate to be housed. Released as Buon Natale... buon anno in Italy and Joyeux Noël, bonne année in France.
Merry Christmas, Mr. Lawrence	1983	During WWII, a British colonel tries to bridge the cultural divides between a British POW and the Japanese camp commander to avoid bloodshed.
A Merry Friggin' Christmas	2014	A estranged father and son are forced together over Christmas and must reconcile their differences to give the grandson one last magic Christmas.
The Merry World of Leopold Z	1965	With Christmas Day fast approaching, a Montreal snowplow operator's plans to complete a series of important errands are disrupted by a massive snowstorm. French Canadian film also released as La vie heureuse de Léopold Z.
A Message from Mars	1913	A science fiction silent film that is based loosely on A Christmas Carol. On Christmas Eve, a miserly and self-centered man is visited by a Martian to show him the error of his ways.
A Midnight Clear	1992	Set toward the end of World War II, the film tells the story of an American intelligence unit that finds a German platoon that wishes to surrender.
The Miracle of Morgan's Creek	1944	A screwball comedy film. After an all-night send-off party for the troops, a small-town girl with an awkward boyfriend wakes up to find herself married and pregnant, with the child's birth due at Christmas.
Miracle on 34th Street	1947	An old man claims to be Santa and a lawyer defends him in court to stop him from being institutionalized.
Miracle on 34th Street	1994	Remake of the 1947 classic of the same name. An old gentleman must convince a department store's special events director and her daughter that Santa Claus exists and a lawyer must convince a court that the Gentleman should not be institutionalized
Mixed Nuts	1994	A comedy centered around a suicide-prevention hotline called Lifesavers on Christmas Eve.
Mr. Soft Touch	1949	Set during Christmas. A World War II veteran comes home to find that his nightclub has been taken over by gangsters and his business partner has been killed. After reclaiming the money that is rightfully his, he is forced to hide out in a settlement house due to a case of mistaken identity. While being pursued by gangsters and a persistent journalist, he learns a valuable lesson about altruism.
My Night at Maud's	1969	Devout Catholic Jean-Louis falls in love with a fellow parishioner but encounters temptation at a Christmas dinner hosted by the seductive Maud.
My Santa	2019	An Indian children's film about a girl named Isa who, after losing her parents in an accident, lives with her grandfather. He tells her stories of Santa Claus to cheer her up. Soon, Santa arrives to meet her, making her wishes come true.
National Lampoon's Christmas Vacation	1989	The Griswold family plans turn to disaster, this time at Christmas. The third film in the Vacation series.
Nativity!	2009	Struggling teacher Mr. Maddens puts on the school nativity play, which is mistaken as a big Hollywood production.
Nativity 2: Danger in the Manger	2012	The children of St. Bernadette's entering the National 'Song for Christmas' competition.
Nativity 3: Dude, Where's My Donkey?	2014	The children of St. Bernadette's have to reunite their teacher with his fiancée.
Nativity Rocks! This Ain't No Silent Night	2018	The staff and students at St. Bernadette's Primary School audition for a coveted place in a spectacular rock musical competition.
The Nativity Story	2006	A drama film based on the Birth of Jesus
Never Say Goodbye	1946	A daughter works to bring her parents back together during the holidays, which leads to comedic results. This is Errol Flynn's first purely comedic role since Footsteps in the Dark.
The Night Before	2015	On Christmas Eve, three lifelong friends spend the night in New York City looking for the Holy Grail of Christmas parties.
The Nightmare Before Christmas	1993	An Tim Burton stop motion film; The mascot of Halloween, Jack Skellington grows tired of having to be scary on Halloween and decides to try celebrating/hosting Christmas
Noel	2004	Five New Yorkers come together on Christmas Eve, seeking a miracle.
Noelle	2019	The story revolves around Santa's daughter (Anna Kendrick) who is forced to take over the family business when her father dies and her brother (Bill Hader) is clearly not up to the job.
Nothing like the Holidays	2008	A Puerto Rican family in Chicago gather for their possibly last Christmas together.
O. Henry's Full House	1952	An anthology film, covering five of O. Henry's short stories, including the Christmas short story: The Gift of the Magi.
Office Christmas Party	2016	When the CEO tries to close her hard-partying brother's branch, he and his Chief Technical Officer must rally their co-workers and host an epic office Christmas party to impress a potential client and close a sale that will save their jobs.
Oh. What. Fun.	2025	A woman named Claire plans a special Christmas, but is forgotten by her family.
One Magic Christmas	1985	An angel shows a young mother the true meaning of Christmas.
Paul Blart: Mall Cop	2009	A bumbling mall security guard finds himself in a middle of a heist and is the only one in position to rescue hostages.
Period of Adjustment	1962	Two couples hash out their respective marital difficulties on Christmas Eve.
Plácido	1960	Spanish comedy where affluent women in a provincial town organize a Christmas campaign of feeding the poor.
The Polar Express	2004	First ImageMovers CGI film, Tom Hanks and director Robert Zemeckis (Forrest Gump, Cast Away) reunite for Polar Express, an inspiring adventure based on the beloved children's book by Chris Van Allsburg. When a doubting young boy takes an extraordinary train ride to the North Pole, he embarks on a journey of self-discovery that shows him that the wonder of life never fades for those who believe.
Prancer	1989	Refusing to give up her belief in Santa Claus, a child, Jessica Riggs (Rebecca Harrell), discovers a hurt reindeer in the woods, which she believes to be Prancer.
The Preacher's Wife	1996	Remake of the 1947 classic, The Bishop's Wife. An angel is sent, during the Christmas period, to help a preacher save his church and his family, but he becomes distracted with the preacher's wife.
Red One	2024	The head of North Pole security (Dwayne Johnson) teams up with a notorious hacker (Chris Evans) to locate a kidnapped Santa Claus (J. K. Simmons) on Christmas Eve.
The Ref	1994	Bickering spouses annoy a cat burglar who takes them hostage in their Connecticut home before Christmas dinner with the family.
Remember the Night	1940	In New York City just before Christmas a woman thief (Barbara Stanwyck) is caught, but the trial is unexpectedly continued until after the holiday. The kind-hearted prosecutor (Fred MacMurray) gets her out on bond, and she ends up spending the holiday going on a trip home with him. They both fall in love, and return to New York City where she has to face the conclusion of the trial. (A romantic melodrama with a Christmas theme.)
Rent	2005	Set around Christmas, a group of New Yorkers struggles with their careers, love lives, and the effects of the AIDS epidemic on their community.
Rise of the Guardians	2012	An DreamWorks Animation CGI animation film based on The Guardians of Childhood and The Man in the Moon by William Joyce; Jack Frost is asked to join Santa Claus, the Easter Bunny, the Tooth Fairy, and the Sandman as a Guardian to protect the world's children from darkness and despair from the evil boogeyman Pitch Black as he attempts to sabotage Easter.
Rocky IV	1985	The fourth installment in the Rocky film series. Rocky challenges Drago to an unsanctioned 15-round fight in the Soviet Union on Christmas Day
Rudolph the Red-Nosed Reindeer: The Movie	1998	An animated film which retells of the story of the fictional character, created by Robert L. May, Rudolph the Red-Nosed Reindeer
Santa Claus	1959	A Mexican fantasy film about Santa, who battles a demon from ruining Christmas.
Santa Claus Conquers the Martians	1964	The Martians decide to abduct Santa Claus, and they kidnap two children. The film is often considered one of the worst films ever made.
Santa Claus: The Movie	1985	The story of where Santa Claus came from and his attempts to save Christmas after his elf gets mixed up with an evil toy tycoon.
The Santa Clause	1994	When Santa supposedly dies after falling off his roof, Scott Calvin is required to take Santa's place.
The Santa Clause 2	2002	First sequel to The Santa Clause. Santa (aka, Scott Calvin) has to juggle finding a wife and getting married before the next Christmas Eve or he will lose the title of being Santa and discovers his son Charlie is on the naughty list, so he has a double created to watch over the North Pole, but the double becomes a dictator there.
The Santa Clause 3: The Escape Clause	2006	Santa/Scott Calvin invites his in-laws over at the North Pole and tries to reverse a spell by the mischievous Jack Frost to keep his title.
Santa with Muscles	1996	Due to an unusual series of events, a bodybuilder with amnesia thinks that he is Santa Claus.
A Savage Christmas	2023	After years of estrangement, a transgender woman returns home for Christmas with her new boyfriend, to find that instead of her transition being the expected focus it is instead overshadowed by family secrets and lies.
Saving Christmas	2014	A man convinces his brother-in-law that Christmas is still a Christian holiday, and endeavors to "put Christ back into Christmas".
Screwed	2000	A chauffeur kidnaps his rich boss's dog to hold it for ransom, but when she accidentally gets the dog back, she thinks that it's the chauffeur who's been kidnapped.
Season's Beatings	1999	A French comedy-drama film. Following the recent death of her second husband, a woman invites her estranged daughters from her first marriage to come and spend Christmas with her. Released as La Bûche in France.
Serendipity	2001	A man (John Cusack) and a woman (Kate Beckinsale) meet on Christmas Eve circa 1991 and reunite a decade later on the same day.
The Shop Around the Corner	1940	Two shop employees dislike each other but fall in love as anonymous pen pals.
Six Weeks	1982	A 12-year-old girl dying from leukemia flies to New York City and assumes the lead role of Marie in The Nutcracker with the New York City Ballet at Lincoln Center during Christmas.
Spirited	2022	A musical version of Charles Dickens' story of a miserly misanthrope who's taken on a magical journey.
The Star	2017	An Sony Pictures Animation CGI animation film based about the Nativity of Jesus and the Christmas star.
Star in the Night	1945	A Modern-day retelling of the Nativity story set on Christmas Eve at a diner and auto court in the desert Southwest United States. It won the Academy Award for Best Short Subject (Two-Reel).
Step Brothers	2008	Two adult stepbrothers learn to get along, with two Christmas seasons serving as plot points.
The Sure Thing	1985	A free-spirited college freshman plans to visit California during winter break. But he's stuck going cross-country with a attractive but domineering girl who has rejected him and can't stand him.
Surviving Christmas	2004	A lonely millionaire pays a family $250,000 to spend Christmas with him by living in the home that he grew up in.
Susan Slept Here	1954	A bachelor screenwriter finds himself playing host to a teenage delinquent over the holidays.
The Thin Man	1934	A retired detective is asked to follow the trail of a missing inventor. Although reluctant to interrupt his Christmas holiday, he is persuaded to investigate by his wife's craving for adventure, and together they embark upon a case that leads to the disclosure of deception and murder.
This Christmas	2007	At holiday time, family matriarch Ma'Dere Whitfield (Loretta Devine) assembles her large brood for their first reunion in four years. However, family ties show signs of strain when various secrets come to light, especially concerning Marine Claude's (Columbus Short) true military status, Quentin's (Idris Elba) debts, and teenage Baby's (Chris Brown) secret plans to become a singer.
Tinsel Town	2025	Finding himself typecast and blacklisted, Hollywood actor Bradley Mac (Kiefer Sutherland) resorts to doing theatre work in England only to discover it involves appearing in a small town panto of Cinderella.
Tokyo Godfathers	2003	Three homeless people, (an alcoholic, a former drag queen, and a young runaway) find a newborn baby girl abandoned in a garbage dump on Christmas Eve and attempt to return her to her parents in this bittersweet dramedy.
Trading Places	1983	The lives of an upper-class commodities broker and a homeless street hustler cross paths when they are unknowingly made part of an elaborate bet.
Trail of Robin Hood	1950	Roy Rogers and his friends come to the aid of a Christmas tree farmer.
Trapped in Paradise	1994	Three brothers rob a bank on Christmas, but they are forced to return it to prevent a murder.
Unaccompanied Minors	2006	A group of unaccompanied minors bond while snowed in at the midwestern Hoover International Airport during the holiday season and ultimately create a makeshift holiday themselves.
Unnikrishnante Adyathe Christmas	1988	An Indian drama film about a man on the lookout for a child who has gone missing on Christmas.
A Very Harold & Kumar Christmas	2011	The third installment in the Harold & Kumar franchise. The stoner estranged duo reunite to hunt for a Christmas tree and get into chaos and hi-jinks along the way and one of them deals with having a family and the other is expecting a baby.
We're No Angels	1955	Three escaped prisoners hide out in the home of a kindly shopkeeper and repay his kindness by helping him and his family out of several crises.
While You Were Sleeping	1995	Lonely transit worker Lucy pulls her longtime crush, Peter, from the path of an oncoming train. At the hospital, doctors report that Peter is in a coma, and a misplaced comment from Lucy causes Peter's family to assume that she is his fiancée. When Lucy doesn't correct them, they take her into their home and confidence.
White Christmas	1954	As in Holiday Inn, musicians bring Irving Berlin's lyrics to a New England lodge, this time in Vermont. But it is not a remake of the film.
Why Him?	2016	A holiday gathering threatens to go off the rails when Ned Fleming (Bryan Cranston) realizes that his daughter's millionaire boyfriend (James Franco) is about to pop the question.
The World of Henry Orient	1964	In Manhattan, a pair of teenage schoolgirls and friends both develop crushes on a womanizing concert pianist.

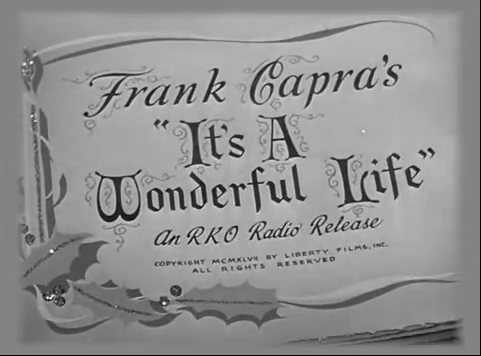
It's a Wonderful Life, 1946

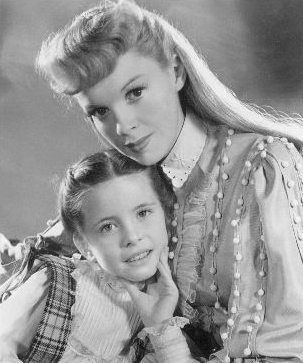
Meet Me in St. Louis, Judy Garland Margaret O'Brien, 1944

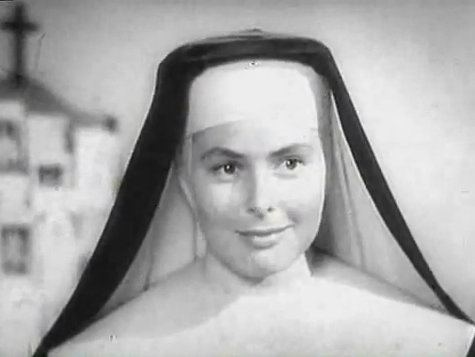
Ingrid Bergman, The Bells of St. Mary's, 1945

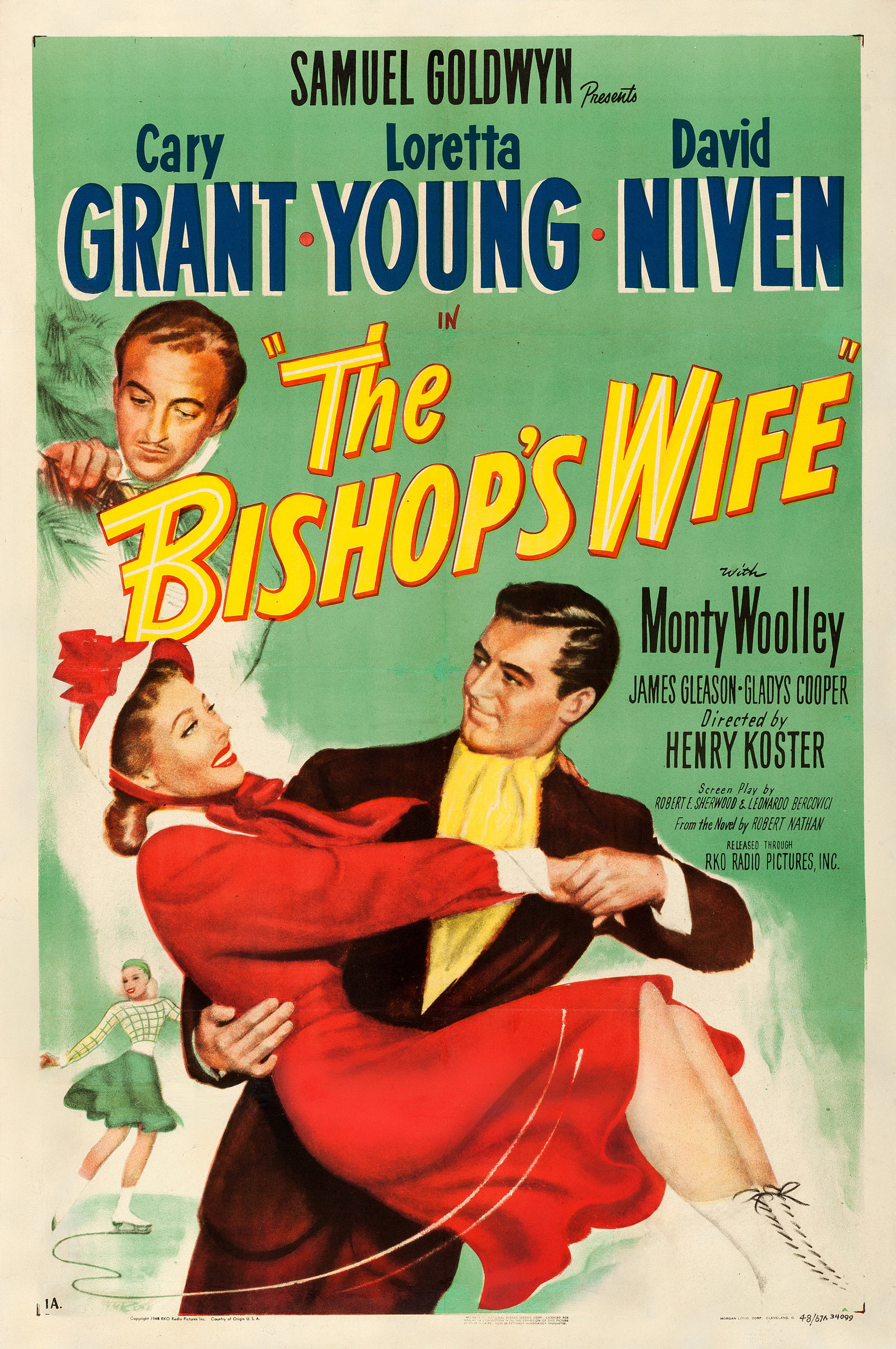
The Bishop's Wife, 1948

=== A Christmas Carol adaptations ===
A Christmas Carol is an 1843 novella by Charles Dickens.

Title	Year	Description
A Christmas Carol	1938	MGM's adaptation of Charles Dickens' story starring Reginald Owen as Scrooge.
A Christmas Carol	1971	Oscar-winning animated adaptation, with Alastair Sim and Michael Hordern recreating their roles as Scrooge and Marley's Ghost, narrated by Michael Redgrave; Directed by Richard Williams; Produced by Chuck Jones.
A Christmas Carol	1984	An adaptation of Dickens' tale, starring George C Scott as Ebenezer Scrooge.
A Christmas Carol	2009	Disney's animated adaptation of Charles Dickens' story starring Jim Carrey as Scrooge.
Barbie in a Christmas Carol	2008	Barbie stars in an adaptation of Charles Dickens' story about a spoiled opera singer who meets three spirits that change her life forever.
Christmas Carol: The Movie	2001	An animated retelling of Charles Dickens' classic tale, starring Simon Callow as Ebenezer Scrooge, Nicolas Cage as Jacob Marley and Kate Winslet as Belle, Scrooge's past love.
Ebenezer	2026	An adaptation by Ti West starring Johnny Depp as Ebenezer Scrooge.
Ghosts of Girlfriends Past	2009	Features a wedding day and the day before, rather than the familiar Christmas and Christmas Eve from A Christmas Carol. The three ghosts share similar appearances with the original descriptions, and the film shares the traditional plot points from the book.
Mickey's Christmas Carol	1983	An animated adaptation of Charles Dickens' story starring Disney characters.
The Muppet Christmas Carol	1992	Jim Henson's creations tackle Charles Dickens' festive favorite.
Scrooge	1935	Early film adaptation of A Christmas Carol, starring Seymour Hicks as Scrooge.
Scrooge	1951	Charles Dickens' ghostly tale on Christmas, starring Alastair Sim as Ebenezer Scrooge.
Scrooge	1970	A musical adaptation of Charles Dickens' tale, starring Albert Finney in the title role and Alec Guinness as Jacob Marley
Scrooge: A Christmas Carol	2022	Netflix's animated musical adaptation of Charles Dickens' story starring Luke Evans as Scrooge; essentially a scaled-down version of the 1970 musical starring Albert Finney.
Scrooge, or, Marley's Ghost	1901	Short silent adaptation of Charles Dickens' 1843 novella A Christmas Carol. An elderly miserly man is giving the chance of redemption following the visit by the ghost of his former business partner Jacob Marley and the spirits of Christmas Past, Present and Yet to Come.
Scrooged	1988	A modern, dark-humored interpretation of Charles Dickens' story, with Christmas spirits visiting a cynical, selfish television executive played by Bill Murray.
Spirited	2022	A musical/comedy version of Charles Dickens's story of a miserly misanthrope who is taken on a magical journey.

=== The Nutcracker adaptations ===
The Nutcracker is an 1892 ballet by Pyotr Ilyich Tchaikovsky.

Title	Year	Description
Barbie in the Nutcracker	2001	First Barbie CGI direct-to-video film; Little Clara awakes one night to find her new nutcracker doll come to life and battling against the Mouse King. Clara is shrunk by the king, so she must race to find a princess who can reverse the magic.
The Nutcracker	1967	The Nutcracker is a 1967 Polish film directed by Halina Bielińska and based on E.T.A. Hoffmann's novelette The Nutcracker and the Mouse King.
The Nutcracker	1993	Also known as 'George Balanchine's The Nutcracker' with Macaulay Culkin and narration from Kevin Kline, directed by Emile Ardolino (Dirty Dancing).
The Nutcracker and the Four Realms	2018	A young girl is transported into a magical world of gingerbread soldiers and an army of mice.
Nutcracker Fantasy	1979	Stop motion animated film produced by Sanrio.
The Nutcracker in 3D	2010	Live-action 3D musical adaptation of Pyotr Ilyich Tchaikovsky's 1892 ballet The Nutcracker. In 1920s Vienna a little girl's godfather gives her a special doll one Christmas Eve.
Nutcracker: The Motion Picture	1986	A performing arts film designed by Maurice Sendak.
The Nutcracker Prince	1990	An animated film with Keifer Sutherland.
The Nuttiest Nutcracker	1999	A group of fruits and vegetables try to help the Nutcracker's army get a star upon a Christmas tree while stopping a rodent army from destroying Christmas.
Tom and Jerry: A Nutcracker Tale	2007	Dancing with a music-box ballerina, in an enchanted kingdom with candy forests and singing snowflakes, Jerry is as happy can be until Tom crashes the party.

=== Christmas Action/Thriller films ===
Title	Year	Description
1941	1979	The story involves a panic in the Los Angeles area after the December 1941 attack on Pearl Harbor.
A Force of One	1979	A karate champion is hired to assist an anti-narcotics police unit, who are being targeted by a killer. The events take place during the Christmas season.
Better Watch Out	2016	A babysitter and the child she is looking after must fight off a home invasion.
Brazil	1985	A bureaucrat in a dystopic society becomes an enemy of the state as he pursues the woman of his dreams
Blast of Silence	1961	A hitman returns to his native New York City from Cleveland to commit a murder for hire during the Christmas season.
Blue Christmas	1978	UFOs appear on Earth during the Christmas season, and people who actually see them suddenly find that their blood has turned blue. Panic and hysteria results in the new "blue-bloods" being persecuted by the rest of mankind.
Carry-On	2024	A young TSA officer is blackmailed into letting a dangerous package on board an upcoming flight during Christmas Day.
Cash on Demand	1961	Set during the Christmas, a bank manager assists a con man in robbing his own bank, after the con man has led the bank manager to believe that he has kidnapped his wife and son.
Children of Men	2006	In 2027, in a chaotic world in which women have somehow become infertile, a former activist agrees to help transport a miraculously pregnant woman to a sanctuary at sea.
Cobra	1986	Two LAPD detectives must protect a witness from a cult of psychopathic killers.
Destination Tokyo	1943	A WWII film. To provide information for the first air raid over Tokyo, a U.S. submarine sneaks into Tokyo Bay and places a spy team ashore.
Die Hard	1988	New York policeman John McClane must save the Nakatomi Christmas Party from a group of armed men on Christmas Eve in Los Angeles.
Die Hard 2	1990	John McClane returns this time to battle terrorists who have seized control of Dulles airport on Christmas Eve a year after the first film.
Donnie Brasco	1997	A section of the movie takes place during Christmas where Donnie eats dinner at Lefty's house and misses his own family's Christmas.
Enemy of the State	1998	A lawyer becomes targeted by a corrupt politician and his N.S.A. goons when he accidentally receives key evidence to a politically motivated crime.
Exit Speed	2008	Passengers on a bus become entangled in a conflict with a gang of bikers on Christmas Eve.
Fatman	2020	A rowdy, unorthodox Santa Claus is fighting to save his declining business. Meanwhile, Billy, a neglected and precocious 12-year-old, hires a hit man to kill Santa after receiving a lump of coal in his stocking.
Gremlins	1984	A young man inadvertently breaks three important rules concerning his new pet and unleashes a horde of malevolently mischievous monsters on a small town on Christmas Eve.
I Am Legend	2007	On Christmas Eve, when the Krippin Virus mutated and broke out, Neville took Zoe and Marley to an evacuation point to be lifted to safety.
In Bruges	2008	Guilt-stricken after a job gone wrong, hitman Ray and his partner await orders from their ruthless boss in Bruges, Belgium, the last place in the world Ray wants to be.
Invasion U.S.A.	1985	A CIA agent (Chuck Norris) hunts the Soviet agent (Richard Lynch) leading a group of communist-backed terrorists who invade the United States and attack American citizens during the Christmas season.
Jurassic World	2015	Two kids are sent to Jurassic World theme park situated on Isla Nublar for Christmas vacation, while their parents are getting a divorce. There, chaos follows when a newly unveiled attraction breaks free and wreaks havoc on the island.
Kiss Kiss Bang Bang	2005	After being mistaken for an actor, a New York thief is sent to Hollywood to train under a private eye for a potential movie role, but the duo are thrown together with a struggling actress into a murder mystery.
The Last Boy Scout	1991	A private detective teams up with a former quarterback to expose a corrupt football team's owner and his plot to legalize gambling.
Lethal Weapon	1987	Two cops must set aside their differences to catch a gang of drug smugglers.
The Long Kiss Goodnight	1996	After a Christmas party turns violent, an amnesiac schoolteacher sets out on a journey to find out who she is with the help of a private detective until they discover a dark conspiracy.
Money Train	1995	A vengeful New York City transit cop decides to steal a trainload of subway fares at Christmas. His foster brother, a fellow cop, tries to protect him.
The Night of the Hunter	1955	A religious fanatic marries a naïve widow whose children are reluctant to tell him where their father hid $10,000 he had stolen during Christmas.
Night Train	2009	Passengers and a conductor on a train on Christmas night become involved in a plot to keep a mysterious box that had been in the possession of a passenger who has died.
On Her Majesty's Secret Service	1969	James Bond travels to Switzerland to stop supervillain Ernst Stavro Blofeld from destroying the world food supply with 12 brainwashed young women. Although Christmas is not the film's main theme, it is largely set during the Christmas period, and the Christmas story forms the underlying basis for the film's plot.
P2	2007	A woman is stalked by a deranged psychopath in a parking garage during Christmas.
Rambo: First Blood	1982	When Rambo is in the police station at the beginning of the movie, it still has Christmas decorations hanging around it.
Reindeer Games	2000	An ex-convict gets into a situation against his will and helps rob a group of thieves rob a casino in Michigan.
Rocky IV	1985	Rocky Balboa proudly holds the world heavyweight boxing championship, but a new challenger has stepped forward: Drago, a six-foot-four, 261-pound fighter who has the backing of the Soviet Union. After Drago kills Apollo Creed in the ring, Rocky avenges him and defends the honor of the United States by fighting Drago on Christmas Day in Siberia.
Silent Night	2023	On Christmas Eve, a man witnesses the death of his young son when the boy gets caught in crossfire between warring gangs. Recovering from a wound that cost him his voice, he soon embarks on a bloody and grueling quest to punish those responsible.
The Silent Partner	1978	A bank teller finds out his bank is going to be robbed, and stashes money in his lunchbox, while only giving the thief the small amount left in his register. The robber, disguised as a mall Santa Claus, discovers the deception and begins threatening the teller.
Stalag 17	1953	A group of American airmen at a German POW camp during WW2, plan their escape and discovering the spy in their barracks at Christmastime.
Turbulence	1997	A prisoner is being transferred on Christmas Eve via a 747 flight from New York to Los Angeles, but he has an escape plan.
Violent Night	2022	The film follows Santa Claus (portrayed by David Harbour) as he fights a paramilitary group mercenaries who have taken a wealthy family hostage.
Violent Night 2	2026	Stuck on the naughty list after forgetting the true meaning of Christmas, Santa tries to save a local mall from a ruthless gangster and his squad of goons.
While She Was Out	2008	A troubled housewife has an altercation with a gang of thugs in a shopping mall parking lot on Christmas Eve, leading to a night that none of them could have imagined.

=== Christmas romantic films ===
Title	Year	Description
Carol (film)	2015	An aspiring female photographer and an older woman going through a difficult divorce engage in a forbidden affair during the 1952 Christmas season in New York.
Just Friends	2005	An obese high school graduate reinvents himself as a successful record executive and reconnects with his best friend, with whom he is in love, while visiting his hometown for Christmas in an attempt to get out of the friend zone
Love Story	1970	A boy and a girl from different backgrounds fall in love regardless of their upbringing, and then tragedy strikes, ending on Christmas Eve.

=== Christmas comic book films ===
Title	Year	Description
Batman Returns	1992	Batman faces off against both Penguin and Catwoman during the Christmas season in Gotham City.
Iron Man 3	2013	After a malevolent enemy known as the Mandarin reduces his personal world to rubble, Tony Stark must rely solely on instinct and ingenuity to avenge his losses and protect the people he loves.
Shazam!	2019	An orphaned teenager who continually runs away from foster homes to search for his birth mother, whom he has been seeking ever since being separated from her at a carnival and inherits the powers of an ancient wizard named Shazam, then finally accepts his foster parents and siblings as his "real" family. It stages a lot of the action in a Philadelphia redolent with Santa Claus, jammed toy stores and malls, homemade decorations, and an outdoor Christmas carnival.
Spider-Man: No Way Home	2021	After being exposed by Mysterio, Peter Parker must live with his identity being widely known. After botching a spell performed by Dr. Strange, old enemies from other Marvel films arrive in this dimension to terrorize the city. The ending of this film takes place in New York during the Christmas season.

=== Christmas horror films ===
Title	Year	Description
3615 code Père Noël	1989	A child genius spends Christmas Eve defending himself and his grandfather from a psychotic home invader dressed like Santa Claus.
All Through the House	2015	A Santa-killer terrorizes a neighborhood where a little girl had disappeared from 15 years prior.
Anna and the Apocalypse	2018	Anna struggles to survive the perils of high school, the holidays, and an onslaught of ravenous zombies in this dark comedy musical.
Await Further Instructions	2018	On Christmas Day, a family wake up to discover a mysterious black substance surrounding the house and their TV screen broadcasts a single message: Stay Indoors and Await Further Instructions.
Black Christmas	1974	Sorority sisters are terrorized by a murderer during the Christmas season. A remake of the film was released in 2006.
Black Christmas	2006	Sorority sisters are stalked and murdered on Christmas Eve in this remake of the 1974 thriller.
Black Christmas	2019	A second remake of the 1974 film, it follows a group of sorority sisters stalked by a cult of deranged killers on Christmas.
Christmas Bloody Christmas	2022	A robotic Santa Claus goes on a murder spree on Christmas Eve.
Christmas Cruelty!	2013	A group of friends are terrorized by a serial killer dressed like Santa Claus.
Christmas Evil (originally titled You Better Watch Out, also known as Terror in Toyland)	1980	A deranged man obsessed with Santa Claus ends up going on a murderous rampage dressed as Santa.
A Christmas Horror Story	2015	The film is a series of interwoven stories tied together by a framework story, featuring William Shatner as a radio DJ.
The Conjuring 2	2016	
Don't Open till Christmas	1984	A serial killer butchers men dressed as Santa Claus.
Gremlins	1984	A young man who receives a strange creature called a mogwai as a pet, which then spawns other creatures who transform into small, destructive, evil monsters.
It's a Wonderful Knife	2023	Winnie Carruthers previously saved her town, the idyllic Angel Falls, from a psychotic killer on Christmas Eve, only for the killer to return the following year.
Jaws: The Revenge	1987	The beginning of the movie takes place during Christmas. Sean and his mom talk about decorating the Christmas tree. Then, when Sean goes out in his boat to investigate a piece of wood, Jaws eats him while a chorus onshore sings "The First Noel" in the background, which was too loud for other people onshore to hear his cries for help.
Krampus	2015	A Comedy horror film based upon the legendary Christmas demon, an alter ego of Santa Claus.
The Legend of Hell House	1973	A group of researchers spend the week of Christmas in a haunted English mansion in which previous investigators were killed 20 years earlier.
The Lodge	2019	During a family retreat to a remote winter cabin over the holidays, the father is forced to abruptly depart for work, leaving his two children in the care of his new girlfriend, Grace. Isolated and alone, a blizzard traps them inside the lodge as terrifying events summon spectres from Grace's dark past.
The Mean One	2022	In a sleepy mountain town, Cindy witnesses the murder of her parents by a blood-thirsty green figure in a red Santa suit. Twenty years later, the Christmas-hating monster begins to terrorize the town once more. Cindy finds new purpose in stopping the creature and saving the holiday.
Rare Exports: A Christmas Tale	2010	In the depths of the Korvatunturi mountains lies the closest ever guarded secret of Christmas. A Spielbergian horror romp with a Christmas twist.
Red Snow	2021	Young supernatural romance author living in Lake Tahoe encounters a band of vampires during the Christmas holiday period.
Santa's Slay	2005	Santa Claus is actually a demon who lost a bet with an angel, so he becomes the giver of toys and happiness. But when the bet is off, he returns to his evil ways.
Silent Night	2012	A psychopath dressed as Santa Claus is on a killing spree in a small town, killing those he sees as naughty.
Silent Night	2021	A couple invite their closest friends to join their family for Christmas dinner at their idyllic home in the English countryside. But the world outside is facing impending doom, and no amount of gifts, games or wine can make mankind's imminent destruction go away.
Silent Night, Bloody Night	1972	A series of murders occur in a small New England town on Christmas Eve, after a man inherits a family estate which was once an insane asylum.
Silent Night, Deadly Night	1984	A traumatized young man becomes a Santa suit-clad spree killer on Christmas Eve.
Silent Night, Deadly Night Part 2	1987	The younger sibling of the teenager who was killed while dressed as Santa carries on in his brother's bloody footsteps.
Sint	2010	The story distorts the popular traditions of Sinterklaas and portrays him as a ghost who murders large numbers of people when his annual celebration night coincides with a full moon.
Tales from the Crypt	1972	The first segment in this anthology horror film adapts The Vault of Horror story "...And All Through the House." A glamorous woman murders her husband for insurance proceeds on Christmas Eve, but is visited by an escaped killer dressed as Santa Claus.
Terrifier 3	2024	Two siblings are trying to enjoy their holiday cheer after the events of the first two films. They survived attacks by a serial killer clown five years prior. The killer clown returns to turn their holiday cheer into a nightmare terror.
To All a Goodnight	1980	Five female students at a rural finishing school stay behind to celebrate Christmas weekend together, but their seasonal cheer abruptly comes to an end as they and their boyfriends start becoming victims of a murdering Santa Claus.
Unholy Night	2026	An Italian-Canadian family's Christmas dinner is disrupted by the arrival of the reanimated corpse of their late Nonna.
A Very Flattened Christmas	2024	Employees of a roadkill collection company are killed by a man wearing a reindeer mask.
Whoever Slew Auntie Roo?	1972	Every year, Rosie Forrest, known as "Auntie Roo", throws a lavish overnight Christmas party for ten of the best-mannered children at the local orphanage. Despite her warm demeanour, Rosie is in fact demented and mentally ill and keeps the mummified remains of her daughter Katharine in a nursery room in the attic.
Wind Chill	2007	An unnamed female student at a Pennsylvania university uses the campus rideshare board to find a ride home to Wilmington, Delaware to celebrate Christmas with her family on winter break. She joins an unnamed male student, who is driving home to Wilmington as well. Their car breaks down in the middle of the forest and is stranded. Things escalate when they realize that they are trapped in sub-zero temperature on a haunted highway.

=== Short films ===
Title	Year	Description
An Almost Christmas Story	2024	Disney short.
Alias St. Nick	1935	MGM/Happy Harmonies short.
Bedtime for Sniffles	1940	Merrie Melodies short.
Broken Toys	1935	Silly Symphonies short.
The Candlemaker	1956	A candlemaker entrusts his young son with the task of making candles for their church on Christmas Eve.
The Captain's Christmas	1938	MGM short.
Christmas Comes But Once a Year	1936	Color Classics short. Featuring Professor Grampy from the Betty Boop series.
Star in the Night	1945	Modern retelling of the Christmas story in a motel in the American Southwest. Directed by Don Siegel, the film won an Academy Award for Best Short Film.
Gift Wrapped	1952	Looney Tunes Sylvester and Tweety short.
Good Will to Men	1955	Remake of the 1939 short Peace on Earth. Short set during Christmas Eve. Directed by William Hanna and Joseph Barbera for Metro-Goldwyn-Mayer cartoon studio. Slight differences with this version to original.
Hector's Hectic Life	1948	Noveltoons short.
The Junky's Christmas	1993	Koch Vision short written and narrated by William S. Burroughs.
The Littlest Angel	1950	Coronet Films animated adaptation of the children's book by Charles Tazewell of the same name. Heartwarming story about a little boy who has difficulty adapting to life in heaven as an angel, but on the birth of Jesus, he shows his ability as an angel.
The Madagascar Penguins in a Christmas Caper	2005	Madagascar spin-off.
Merry Xmas	2015	A father lies to his children about he and their mother getting divorced to assure that they will come home for Christmas.
Mice Meeting You	1950	Noveltoons short featuring Herman and Katnip.
Mickey's Christmas Carol	1983	Short featuring Mickey Mouse.
Mickey's Good Deed	1932	Mickey Mouse short.
Mickey's Orphans	1931	Mickey Mouse short.
The Night Before Christmas	1933	Silly Symphonies short.
The Night Before Christmas	1941	Tom and Jerry MGM short.
Olaf's Frozen Adventure	2017	Olaf and Sven try to find a Christmas tradition for Anna and Elsa to enjoy.
One Ham's Family	1943	MGM short directed by Tex Avery.
Peace on Earth	1939	Short set during Christmas Eve. Directed by Hugh Harman for Metro-Goldwyn-Mayer cartoon studio, it was nominated for an Academy Award in 1939.
Pluto's Christmas Tree	1952	Mickey Mouse short.
The Pups' Christmas	1936	MGM/Happy Harmonies short.
Rudolph the Red-Nosed Reindeer	1948	Jam Handy Organization short; produced and directed by Max Fleischer. First adaptation of the original 1939 story by Robert L. May.
Santa Claus	1898	Short silent drama film about Santa arriving at a house on Christmas Eve to deliver his presents for the children.
Santa vs. the Snowman 3D	2002	IMAX short.
Santa's Surprise	1947	Paramount Pictures short featuring Little Audrey.
Santa's Workshop	1932	Silly Symphonies short.
Seasin's Greetinks!	1933	Popeye The Sailor Paramount Pictures Fleischer Studios short.
The Shanty Where Santy Claus Lives	1932	Merrie Melodies short.
The Small One	1978	Short based on the book by Charles Tazewell.
The Snowman	1982	A young boy befriends a snowman that he created.
The Snowman and the Snowdog	2012	A young boy who has lost his dog makes a snowdog and goes on a journey with him and a snowman.
Story Time	1979	An animated compilation film comprising three stories written, directed and animated by Terry Gilliam. One story is "The Christmas Card", which focuses on a lonely old man receiving a Christmas card in the post. Suddenly his other Christmas cards come to life with the cards connected only by the Three Wise Men, who follow the Star of Bethlehem from one card to another.
Toy Tinkers	1949	Donald Duck short.

== Made-for-television, internet-streaming and direct-to-video films ==
These are Christmas-themed films that were made for television, the internet and the direct-to-video or direct-to-DVD market.

=== Family ===
Title	Year	Description
8-Bit Christmas	2021	A father recollects his schemes to acquire a Nintendo Entertainment System for Christmas against the wishes of his parents.
12 Dates of Christmas	2011	A woman finds herself caught in a Christmas time loop, and tries to figure out how to break the cycle.
12 Men of Christmas	2009	A high-powered New York publicist moves to Montana after losing her job and fiancé and finds romance with a member of the local fire and rescue squad.
The Angel of Pennsylvania Avenue	1996	In 1932, three children travel to Washington in the hope of convincing President Hoover to release their wrongly convicted father from jail in time for Christmas.
Angela's Christmas	2017	An animation film about a little girl, who on attending Church Christmas Eve, becomes concerned the baby Jesus in the crib will be cold.
Angela's Christmas Wish	2020	An animation film and sequel to the 2017 film Angela's Christmas. A little girl wishes for her family to be reunited for Christmas, including her father who is working in Australia.
Babes in Toyland	1986	A young girl travels to Toyland. Starring Drew Barrymore and Keanu Reeves.
Beethoven's Christmas Adventure	2011	A Christmas Elf accidentally takes off in Santa's sleigh, crash lands in a small town, and loses Santa's magic toy bag. Lovable dog Beethoven (voiced by Tom Arnold) must retrieve Santa Claus' magic toy bag from crooks.
Bernard and the Genie	1991	Bernard is fired from his job and his girlfriend leaves him, both on Christmas Eve. The girlfriend takes all of his possessions with her, leaving behind only an old lamp. His Christmas suddenly becomes brighter when he rubs it.
Best. Christmas. Ever!	2023	Friendships are put to the ultimate test for two college best friends over a boastful holiday newsletter.
The Best Christmas Pageant Ever	1983	A church Christmas pageant touches the hearts of a family of juvenile delinquents.
Booky and the Secret Santa	2007	A young girl tries to make a happy Christmas for herself and her family during the 1930s Great Depression.
Borrowed Hearts	1997	A wealthy manufacturer pays an impoverished single mother who works in his factory, and her daughter, to pretend to be his "family" at Christmastime, to impress a visiting old-fashioned tycoon interested in buying his company.
A Boy Called Christmas	2021	A young boy must journey to a magical kingdom called Elfhelm.
The Boy Who Saved Christmas	1998	
A Boyfriend for Christmas	2004	Santa plays matchmaker and sets up a young couple for Christmas.
Bush Christmas	1947	Set at Christmas. Two siblings and their friend set off to recover their father's mare that was stolen from their farm.
Call Me Claus	2001	Santa Claus is preparing to retire, and grooms an American businesswoman (Whoopi Goldberg) to be his replacement.
Call Me Mrs. Miracle	2010	
Candy Cane Lane	2023	A family man is on a mission to win his neighborhood's annual Christmas home decoration contest and inadvertently makes a deal with a mischievous elf that brings the 12 Days of Christmas to life and meets several living glass figurines in a Christmas village and they reveal the elf is evil.
A Castle for Christmas	2021	To escape a scandal, a bestselling author journeys to Scotland, where she falls in love with a castle—and faces off with the grumpy duke who owns it.
Catch a Christmas Star	2013	A young girl attempts to reunite her father with his high school sweetheart, who has since become a successful pop singer.
A Chance of Snow	1998	A divorced couple get snowed in at Christmastime.
Chasing Christmas	2005	In a world where the holidays are run by the efficient Bureau of Yuletide Affairs, a bitter and burned-out Ghost of Christmas Past decides to go AWOL while on a "mission" and leave his "target" stranded in 1965.
A Child's Christmas in Wales	1987	Based on a prose by the Welsh poet Dylan Thomas and tells of a man's memory of one Christmas from the viewpoint as a young boy.
A Child's Christmases in Wales	2009	Comedic reminiscences of three 1980s Christmas, loosely adapted from the Dylan Thomas story.
Christmas at Water's Edge	2004	An angel team with a spoiled college coed to organize a Christmas concert at a community youth center.
The Christmas Blessing	2005	After losing a patient in surgery, medical resident Nathan Andrews takes a break from his career and returns to his small town roots. A chance encounter with an old acquaintance offers him a promise for the future, only for a tragedy to call into question everything he believes.
The Christmas Box	1995	Based on the bestselling book of the same name, a couple and their daughter move in with a widow and discover a box containing the answer to the first gift of Christmas.
Christmas Caper	2007	A Grinch-like thief retreats to her hometown for Christmas. Can the spirit of Christmas, combined with a stint babysitting her niece and nephew, rid her of her wicked ways?
The Christmas Card	2006	A soldier serving in Afghanistan receives a Christmas card from a Californian woman he has never met. He visits the town to find the inspiration behind the card.
The Christmas Chronicles	2018	A brother and sister, Kate and Teddy Pierce, become embroiled in an adventure after they try to catch video evidence of Santa Claus on camera.
The Christmas Chronicles 2	2020	A couple of two years later, Kate Pierce and Jack Booker help Santa Claus save the North Pole from Belsnickel.
Christmas Comes to Willow Creek	1987	Two truck-driving brothers attempt to transport a load of Christmas gifts from California to an economically strapped Alaska town.
The Christmas Consultant	2012	A stressed-out working couple hires a consultant to help them plan an elaborate Christmas party for the wife's boss and husband's relatives.
Christmas Cottage	2008	Tells the story of the inspiration behind Thomas Kinkade's painting The Christmas Cottage, and how the artist was motivated to begin his career after discovering his mother was in danger of losing their family home.
Christmas Cupid	2010	Sloan is beautiful, stylish, and on the fast track to success at her public relations firm. After her client Caitlin dies and becomes her own personal ghost of Christmas past, present, and future; she finds out firsthand that her unethical ways need to change, and reuniting with a past jilted lover may be the answer.
Christmas Do-Over	2006	In a remake of the plot from Groundhog Day, a man has to repeat Christmas Day over and over until he realizes how selfish he has become and has to change his ways.
Christmas Every Day	1996	In a juvenile reworking of Groundhog Day, a self-centered teenager is forced to relive the same Christmas over and over again after his sister wishes it were Christmas every day.
The Christmas Heart	2012	Neighbors along a quaint street in Cleveland suspend their annual Christmas tradition of lighting luminaria, out of respect for their neighbours whose son desperately needs a heart transplant. A donor is found but a blizzard threatens the heart's delivery.
The Christmas Hope	2009	A couple's marriage is strained following the death of their son. They agree to take a girl, whose mother died in a car accident, into their home over the Christmas period.
Christmas Icetastrophe	2014	A small town preparing for Christmas is struck by a meteor that causes extreme, spontaneous ice.
Christmas in Canaan	2009	In rural Cannan, Texas a clash of classmates, one a tough farm boy, the other a bright bookish black boy evokes an unlikely friendship. It's amidst the magic of Christmas the boys learn about family, hope, and love despite living in the shadow of racism. Followed by the sequel Christmas Comes Home to Canaan. Both starring Billy Ray Cyrus.
Christmas in Connecticut	1992	A 1992 made for TV remake of the 1945 film directed by Arnold Schwarzenegger.
Christmas in the Highlands	2019	A New York sales manager is sent to the remote Scottish Highlands at Christmas to acquire a limited edition perfume from a dashing Earl preparing for his annual ball and falls in love instead.
Christmas in Wonderland	2009	Two children find a bag full of counterfeit money and find Santa along as well.
Christmas Inheritance	2017	Before ambitious heiress Ellen Langford can inherit her father's business, she must deliver a special Christmas card to her dad's former partner in Snow Falls. When a snowstorm strands her at the town inn, she discovers the true gift of Christmas.
A Christmas Kiss	2011	A woman shares an impulsive elevator kiss with a handsome stranger, who turns out to be her boss's boyfriend. They start to care for each other as Christmas approaches.
Christmas Lilies of the Field	1979	A seasonal sequel to the theatrical film Lilies of the Field (1963) has its African-American protagonist returning to the chapel he had built in the Arizona desert for a group of German nuns.
The Christmas List	1997	A woman makes a list of things she wants for Christmas and learns the lesson, "Be careful what you wish for."
A Christmas Memory	1966	An award-winning adaptation of Truman Capote's poignant, nostalgic reminiscence about his childhood best friend – a childlike elderly relative with whom he makes fruitcakes and other gifts, in Depression-era Alabama.
A Christmas Memory	1997	A story about a friendship between a boy, Buddy, and his older cousin, Sook, during Christmas time.
The Christmas Messenger	1975	An angel, present at the birth of Jesus, returns to earth each year to listen to the Christmas carols and spread the story of the nativity.
Christmas Miracle in Caufield, U.S.A.	1977	Coal miners are trapped in a mine following an explosion on Christmas Eve, 1951.
The Christmas Miracle of Jonathan Toomey	2007	A bereaved boy and his widowed mother commission a grumpy woodcarver to carve a nativity set and thus form a relationship that enables them all to put their sadness behind them and move on.
The Christmas Note	2015	A reclusive workaholic, estranged from her mother for ten years, learns after her death that she has an older sibling who was given up for adoption. Though reluctant, she searches for her sibling with the help of her neighbor (a military spouse who returned home while her husband recovers overseas from a combat injury; their son wants nothing more but for his dad to be home for Christmas).
Christmas on Division Street	1991	A boy moves to Philadelphia and meets a homeless old-timer who becomes his teacher and his guide. Starring Fred Savage and Hume Cronyn.
Christmas on the Square	2020	A woman plans to sell a small town with no regard for the people living there, until she receives a miraculous visit.
A Christmas Prince	2017	Christmas comes early for an aspiring young journalist when she's sent abroad to get the scoop on a dashing prince who's poised to be king.
A Christmas Prince: The Royal Baby	2019	Amber and Richard host royals from a faraway kingdom to renew a sacred truce, but when the priceless treaty disappears, peace is put in jeopardy and an ancient curse threatens their family.
A Christmas Prince: The Royal Wedding	2018	A year after Amber helped Richard secure the crown, the two are set to tie the knot in a royal Christmas wedding – but their plans are jeopardized when Amber finds herself second-guessing whether or not she's cut out to be queen.
The Christmas Secret (aka Flight of the Reindeer)	2000	A scientist sets out to prove that reindeer can fly, and along the way discovers the true meaning of faith, family, and Christmas.
The Christmas Shoes	2002	Trio of interlocking stories, adopted from the hit song of the same name. Followed by sequels The Christmas Blessing and The Christmas Hope.
A Christmas Snow	2010	A woman must face the hurts of her past while trapped with two strangers in her house for Christmas.
A Christmas Star	2015	Noelle is a young girl, born on Christmas under the Christmas Star and as a result has developed special abilities to perform miracles. She applies these gifts to a miserly developer that threatens her peace and the village's peace.
The Christmas Star	1986	
A Christmas Story 2	2012	Now-teenaged Ralphie Parker schemes to acquire a car for Christmas in this sequel to the theatrical film.
A Christmas Story Christmas	2022	The now-adult Ralphie returns to the house on Cleveland Street to give his kids a magical Christmas like the one he had as a child, reconnecting with childhood friends, and reconciling the passing of his Old Man.
A Christmas to Remember	1978	During the Great Depression, a young boy is sent to Minnesota to live with his grandparents, who are still grieving the loss of their son in World War I.
The Christmas Tree	1996	An elderly nun, who's been growing an evergreen tree for decades, forms a bond with a gardener who wants to fell it and display it at New York's Rockefeller Center for the holidays.
A Christmas Tree Miracle	2013	An eccentric Christmas tree farmer takes in a distressed family for the holidays.
A Christmas Visitor	2002	A family hasn't celebrated Christmas since their son died on Christmas Day 1991 serving in the Gulf War but end up doing so after meeting "Matthew", a hitchhiker who claimed to know their son while deployed.
A Christmas Wedding	2006	Two people who meet on Christmas Day plan to marry on Christmas Day two years later.
The Christmas Wish	1998	A businessman tries to uncover a family secret for his grandmother after he returns to a small town to modernize his family's real-estate company.
Christmas with a Capital C	2010	Small Alaska town erupts into conflict over the public Nativity scene.
Christmas with Holly	2012	Traumatized by her mother's death, a 6-year-old girl stops talking but is cared for by her three uncles. The story unfolds as all of them find the importance of family.
Christmas with You	2022	Angelina, a pop star, escapes from her daily life to grant a young fan's wish in small-town New York, where she not only finds the inspiration to revitalize her career but also a shot at true love.
A Christmas Without Snow	1980	Church choir members try to balance personal issues with practice as the holiday approaches.
Clarence	1990	Clarence Odbody tries to help a young mother who is about to commit suicide.
Comfort and Joy	2003	Single businesswoman wakes up married and a mother after a car accident.
The Custom Mary	2013	A young Latina in East Los Angeles meets an African American Lowrider and struggles to reconcile her faith and blossoming love affair while becoming dangerously involved in a religious attempt to clone Jesus.
Dashing Through the Snow	2023	Eddie is a social worker who doesn't believe in the magic of Christmas due to a childhood incident, but on Christmas Eve, him and his daughter Charlotte encounters Santa Claus in person and has a wild night out with him through town.
Dear Santa	2024	The story of a dyslexic and meek sixth-grader who writes a Christmas list to Santa Claus to help with his problems, only for his misspelling to lead to him meeting what appears to be Satan, who decides to pose as the benevolent Christmas figure and offers the boy three wishes in exchange for his soul.
A Dream for Christmas	1973	A hardworking African American minister relocates his family to Los Angeles in the 1950s. But, when the family finally arrives, they discover that the church is in major disrepair and scheduled for demolition and they must work together to save the church.
Eloise at Christmastime	2003	Six-year-old Eloise has various adventures at the Plaza Hotel before the holiday, in this adaptation of Kay Thompson's book.
An Evergreen Christmas	2014	Aspiring musician Evie Lee must return home to save the family's Christmas Tree farm and decide what's most important in life.
A Fairly Odd Christmas	2012	Second live-action adaptation of Nickelodeon animated series The Fairly OddParents. Timmy must save Christmas with finding Elmer the Elder Elf changes his mind and takes Timmy's name off the naughty list after his actions cause children to lose faith in Santa Claus.
Falling for Christmas	2022	A young, newly engaged heiress has a skiing accident in the days before Christmas. After she is diagnosed with amnesia, she finds herself in the care of the handsome cabin owner and his daughter.
Family Switch	2023	During the holidays, a family called the Walkers all (including their baby and dog) swap in each other's bodies during a rare planetary alignment.
Father Christmas Is Back	2021	Four sisters who have reunited for the Christmas holiday in a Yorkshire mansion. Misunderstandings uncover the long-buried secret that tore their family apart, so many years ago.
Finding John Christmas	2003	A woman and a photojournalist try to track down a mysterious Christmas hero with the help of an angel.
The Gathering	1977	A dying man attempts to reconcile with the family he had abandoned years earlier, by having them come to visit for Christmas.
Genie	2023	An overworked man living in New York City who's not spending enough time with his family, discovers that an antique box he has in his apartment, has a 2,000-year-old, wacky, middle-aged genie living in it and she can grant him wishes.
Godmothered	2020	An unskilled fairy godmother-in-training hunts down a letter written by 10-year-old Mackenzie who is now a mom in her '40s and tries to make her "happily ever after" come true so she can finally be a godmother, and hopefully, preserve the craft.
A Golden Christmas	2009	A Christmas romance film, in which a golden retriever helps to reunite old friends.
Good Luck Charlie, It's Christmas!	2011	Based on the It's a Laugh Productions and Disney Channel Original Series Good Luck Charlie, the film follows the Duncan family, who get separated at Palm Springs on their way to visit Grandma and Grandpa Blankenhooper for Christmas.
A Grandpa for Christmas	2007	During the Christmas season, an old-time film star/singer/hoofer, who is estranged from his daughter and 9-year-old granddaughter, suddenly finds himself bonding with his granddaughter when her mom is hospitalized.
The Greatest Store in the World	1999	A family loses their home at Christmas and in desperation, stays in a department store over the Christmas period.
The Grinch that Stole Bitches	2024	
Grumpy Cat's Worst Christmas Ever	2014	The Internet sensation Grumpy Cat comes to life in her very first movie.
Hank Zipzer's Christmas Catastrophe	2016	It is Christmas and the Zipzer family are preparing for a new baby. Meanwhile, Mr. Rock's Rudolph the Red Nose Rock 'n' Roll Reindeer, is soon turned into a one-woman Christmas Carol by Miss Adolf. Mr. Joy hates Christmas and wants to cancel it altogether but Hank causes a Christmas catastrophe. His catastrophe causing leads to his friends being arrested, and a Christmas tree nearly gets plummeted into a crowd. But will everything go to plan before Hank's new baby brother is born?
Happiest Season	2020	A young woman with a plan to propose to her girlfriend while at her family's annual holiday party discovers her partner hasn't yet come out to her conservative parents.
Happy Christmas	2014	An Irresponsible woman arrives in Chicago to live with her older brother and his wife and baby son. The quiet and relaxed environment they enjoyed before her arrival is now a thing of the past, as the younger sister invites trouble during the festive season.
The Heart of Christmas	2011	The Lockes are devastated when they learn their young son Dax has cancer. But with courage, determination, and faith, they give Dax one last Christmas, even if it's in October.
His and Her Christmas	2005	Rival newspaper columnists battle it out (one to save his career advancement at a major newspaper, the other to save the small community newspaper who is her employer) before finding romance.
A Hobo's Christmas	1987	A hobo decides to return home after being away for 25 years.
Hogfather	2006	It's Hogswatch on the Discworld and the Hogfather has gone missing, requiring Death to take his place while his granddaughter Susan endeavors to find out what has happened.
Holiday Affair	1996	Romance blooms between a widowed mother and a fired toy salesman. A remake of the 1949 film.
Holiday in Handcuffs	2007	A struggling artist working as a waitress kidnaps one of her customers to bring home and meet her parents at Christmas.
Holiday in the Wild	2019	After her husband ends their marriage, Kate embarks on a solo second honeymoon in Africa. There, she and Derek, a pilot, rescue a baby elephant. While nursing the elephant back to health, Kate discovers how much she loves her new surroundings.
A Holiday Romance	1999	A hard school administrator comes to town to close down the school and falls for the charming school music teacher.
Holiday Rush	2019	When a widowed radio DJ is fired, he and his four spoiled children must leave their lives of luxury behind and move in with his aunt just before Christmas.
A Holiday to Remember	1995	Carolyn is leaving the big city with her daughter Jordi for her childhood village, deep in the forest.
Home Alone: The Holiday Heist	2012	Another made-for-TV sequel. 10-year-old Finn and his sister find themselves home alone over the holidays. They're besieged with a trio of bumbling criminals trying to break into their new home!
Home Alone 4: Taking Back the House	2002	A made-for-TV sequel to the theatrical original. Marv and his wife Vera plan to kidnap a prince with help from an inside person that Kevin least suspects.
Home for the Holidays	1972	Four sisters return home to visit their father for Christmas, only to discover that someone is trying to kill him.
Home Sweet Home Alone	2021	A married couple try to steal back a valuable heirloom from a troublesome 10-year-old kid while his parents are away.
The Homecoming: A Christmas Story	1971	A TV movie which was the pilot for the TV series The Waltons.
The House Without a Christmas Tree	1972	A widower, still grieving from his wife's death, refuses to allow a Christmas tree in the home, to the dismay of his young daughter.
How to Make Gravy	2024	A prisoner named Joe writes a letter to his brother four days before Christmas about longing to be with his family, lamenting he can't make gravy for the roast. Based on a classic Australian song by Paul Kelly.
I Saw Mommy Kissing Santa Claus	2002	When a young boy catches his mom kissing Santa, he decides to be as naughty as he can until he drives Santa back to the North Pole.
If You Believe	1999	A Scrooge-like book editor is visited by her inner child, who tries to help rekindle her sense of joy during the holidays.
I'll Be Home for Christmas	1988	A Massachusetts family holds down the World War II home front during Christmas of 1944.
I'll Be Next Door for Christmas	2018	A teenage girl is embarrassed by her holiday-happy family. When her out-of-town boyfriend arrives, she has an idea by hiring actors to play her family for a fake Christmas dinner next door.
In the Nick of Time	1991	An aging Santa Claus struggles to prepare his cynical would-be successor to take over the job in time for Christmas.
It Came Upon the Midnight Clear	1984	After suffering a fatal heart attack, a man (Mickey Rooney) is granted a brief return to life so that he can show his California-bred grandson (Scott Grimes) his first white Christmas in New York.
It Happened One Christmas	1977	A young businesswoman, despondent over the circumstances of her life, contemplates suicide, but is shown the value of her life by a guardian angel, in this feminist remake of It's a Wonderful Life starring the then recently liberated Marlo Thomas.
It Nearly Wasn't Christmas	1989	Santa Claus decides to skip Christmas due to the dwindling number of believers. He along with one of his elves eventually joins to help a little girl meet her father in Los Angeles.
Jingle All the Way 2	2014	Fun-loving, laid-back truck driver Larry Phillips' daughter Noel wants only one thing for Christmas: a talking bear. Her stepdad intends to make sure that Larry can't get one and a war erupts between them.
Jingle Bell Heist	2025	Sparks fly between two thieves who plan on robbing a ritzy department store during the holiday season.
Jingle Jangle: A Christmas Journey	2020	Decades after being betrayed by his apprentice, a once joyful toy maker finds new hope when his bright young granddaughter arrives on his doorstep.
A Kitten for Hitler	2007	Set during Christmas 1941 and follows a little boy, who decides that Hitler probably wouldn't be such a meanie if someone just gave him a present. He believes he can stop the World War by heading to Germany and gifting Hitler a kitten.
Last Train to Christmas	2021	On a Christmas Eve train home, a nightclub manager discovers he can jump back and forward in time. He takes advantage of this phenomenon, changing things in his history, sometimes for the best and sometimes for the worst.
Let It Snow	2019	A snowstorm hits a small midwestern town on Christmas Eve, bringing together a group of high school students. They soon find their friendships and love lives colliding, and Christmas morning, nothing will be the same.
Like Father, Like Santa	1998	A ruthless toy tycoon who is also secretly the son of Santa Claus travels to the North Pole to put an end to an attempted coup.
The Little Match Girl	1986	Musical version of Hans Christian Andersen's story of the same name. A poor girl is in the freezing cold selling matches to make money. Starring Roger Daltrey and Twiggy.
Lost at Christmas	2020	Two strangers stranded in the Scottish Highlands on Christmas Eve team up to try and get home in time for Christmas.
Lost Christmas	2011	On Christmas Eve, a young boy whose life has been marred by a series of tragic events is offered a second chance to have a happy ending, by a mysterious man who appears, seemingly out of nowhere.
Love Hard	2021	After meeting her perfect match on a dating app, an L.A. writer learns she's been catfished when she flies 3,000 miles to surprise him for Christmas.
The Man in the Santa Claus Suit	1979	The lives of three different men are transformed by a magical Santa Claus costume rented to them by a mysterious shopkeeper.
The Man Who Saved Christmas	2002	Fact-based drama of toy inventor A.C. Gilbert, a pacifist toymaker who is forced by the U.S. government to turn his factory into a munitions plant during World War I and is asked to convince consumers to buy bonds instead of toys.
Mary Christmas	2002	Widower's young daughter asks Santa for a new mother.
Meet the Santas	2005	Santa must be married or Christmas will lose its spirit.
Miracle on 34th Street	1973	Remake of the original film.
A Mom for Christmas	1990	A young girl who desires to have a mother in her life gets her to wish at the department store.
The Monster's Christmas	1981	A young girl helps the monsters from her storybook defeat an evil witch that has stolen their voices because they sang better at Christmas carols than she did.
Moonlight and Mistletoe	2007	A man runs a year-round Santa Town.
The Most Wonderful Time of the Year	2008	A Retired policeman attempts to kindle romance between his niece and a visiting chef.
Mr. Christmas	2004	Joel Carter is unable to afford a bicycle for Christmas for his daughter, Carol Lee, and works to make her happy for Christmas.
Mr. Krueger's Christmas	1980	A widowed apartment janitor daydreams to escape his lonely life.
Mr. St. Nick	2002	An aging Santa Claus is ready to retire but first, he must convince his son to take over his job.
Mrs. Miracle	2009	
Mrs. Santa Claus	1996	Santa's wife ends up in New York in the early 1900s near Christmastime.
Must Be Santa	1999	Santa must pass his powers on to his chosen successor, but mistakenly passes them on to an ex-con.
National Lampoon's Christmas Vacation 2: Cousin Eddie's Island Adventure	2003	Cousin Eddie and his family get stranded on what they think is a deserted island for Christmas in this sequel to the 1989 theatrical film. Aired on NBC.
The National Tree	2009	A teenager has his Sitka Spruce tree chosen to be planted outside the White House as the new national Christmas Tree. He and his father end up driving the Tree throughout the country and the tree becomes a national icon.
The Nativity	1978	Biblical account of the birth of Jesus Christ.
Naughty or Nice	2004	A Chicago sports radio shock jock is changed by a Christmas season encounter with a 15-year-old fan who is dying of cancer who forces him to be nice for a day.
The New Adventures of Heidi	1978	Heidi joins Elizabeth and her busy widowed father for a Christmas in New York City.
The Night They Saved Christmas	1984	An oil company dynamites in the North Pole in search of an oil field, unaware that they are endangering Santa Claus.
The Noel Diary	2022	When a best-selling author returns home at Christmas to settle his mother's estate, he finds a diary that holds secrets to the past.
Northpole	2014	A young boy and his new friend Clementine try to bring back the happiness of Christmas before it's too late.
November Christmas	2010	A father tries to provide an early Christmas for his seriously ill young daughter.
Nutcrackers	2024	A strait-laced man finds his life suddenly upended when he becomes the caregiver for his rambunctious, orphaned nephews.
On the 2nd Day of Christmas	1997	Con-woman Trish and her niece/ward Patsy are caught trying to steal from a department store right before Christmas. With the holidays so near, Bert, a store employee, agrees to be responsible for the pair so that Patsy does not need to spend the holidays in social services.
On the Twelfth Day	1955	Live-action musical based on the popular Christmas carol, The Twelve Days of Christmas. Starring and directed by Wendy Toye.
Once Upon a Christmas	2000	Santa's daughter tries to change a family so they are no longer on the Naughty List, or else Santa will cancel Christmas.
One Christmas	1994	A young man is sent to visit his estranged father for Christmas in 1930 in New Orleans.
One Special Night	1999	Strangers get struck in a cottage during a snowstorm and realize they are drawn together. Starring Julie Andrews and James Garner.
Operation Christmas Drop	2020	Congressional aide Erica forgoes family Christmas to travel at her boss's behest. At a beach side Air Force base, she clashes with Capt. Andrew Jantz, who knows her assignment is finding reasons to defund the facility. The film is loosely based on the real-life U.S. Air Force Operation Christmas Drop humanitarian mission.
Patch Town	2014	An employee at a gloomy toy factory discovers that he is really a living doll, and goes on a search to find his "mother" (former owner who bought him).
Picking Up & Dropping Off	2003	A divorced father and a divorced mother start to meet at Denver International Airport when picking up and sending off their children to ex-spouses for holidays.
Plácido	1961	An ill-advised charity campaign, encouraging wealthy citizens to break bread with the less fortunate, sweeps across a small industrial Spanish town on Christmas Eve.
Prancer Returns	2001	Sequel to 1989 film Prancer. A young boy finds a baby reindeer, and he immediately believes that it is Prancer. Determined to get Prancer back to the North Pole in time to help pull Santa's sleigh, he charm's his more cynical family with his tireless faith and creates a magical Christmas Eve.
Prep & Landing	2009	An elf named Wayne is part of the Prep & Landing organization, the group of elves who prepare homes for Santa Claus's visit. After being passed over for a promotion, he begins to slacken in his duties, but he has a change in heart after this results in a child's house not being ready in time and the unprecedented decision to skip it.
A Princess for Christmas	2011	A young woman travels to Europe to stay in a beautiful castle for the holidays at the invitation of an estranged relative, and finds herself falling for a dashing prince.
The Princess Switch	2018	One week before Christmas, a duchess switches places with an ordinary woman from Chicago, who looks exactly like her, and they each fall in love with each other's beaus.
The Princess Switch: Switched Again	2020	Duchess Margaret unexpectedly inherits the throne to Montenaro and hits a rough patch with boyfriend Kevin at the same time. It's up to her double Princess Stacy to get the star-crossed lovers back together.
The Princess Switch 3: Romancing the Star	2021	When a priceless Christmas relic is stolen, royal look-alikes Margaret and Stacy turn to audacious doppelgänger Fiona—and her dashing ex—for help.
Richie Rich's Christmas Wish	1998	After getting blamed for spoiling Christmas Richie Rich, the richest kid in the world, wishes he'd never been born.
The Road to Christmas	2006	A high-powered fashion photographer finds herself stranded in middle America on her way to her wedding in Aspen, Colorado. She gets a lift from a widower and his daughter, setting off a change of events that will change their lives forever.
Roots: The Gift	1988	Kunta Kinte and Fiddler, from Roots, accompany their owner to another plantation at Christmas time and they learn that the son of the owner helps slaves escape.
Samantha: An American Girl Holiday	2004	A wealthy girl visits an orphanage during the holiday season and tries to house them.
Santa and Pete	1999	Saint Nicholas and his friend Pete travel from Europe to the newly discovered America to celebrate Christmas with Dutch settlers. While helping the settlers make peace with the Native Americans Nicholas is gifted a sleigh, reindeer, leather boots, and a red hat and coat, creating the legend of Santa Clause.
Santa Baby	2006	Mary Class (Jenny McCarthy) is a highly successful business executive – who just happens to be the daughter of Santa Claus. But when her father falls ill, Mary returns to the North Pole and the life she left behind to take over for her dad and implement her innovative ideas for running Christmas.
Santa Baby 2: Christmas Maybe	2009	Santa needs his daughter, Mary Class' help again.
Santa Jr.	2002	Santa's son, mistaken for the "Christmas Bandit", is held under house arrest two days before Christmas.
Santa Who?	2000	Santa Claus suffers an attack of amnesia after falling out of his sleigh. Only the innocence of a small child can save Christmas for thousands of people around the world.
Saving Christmas	2017	A middle school student decides to prove that Santa Claus is real.
¡¡Se armó el belén!!	1969	An old-fashion priest is sent to a Madrid church where the revolutionary air makes for a bad audience. His superiors demand that he updates his methods taking the example of a young priest at a modern church.
The Search for Santa Paws	2010	Prequel to Santa Buddies in which Santa loses memory in New York and it's up to his new friend Paws to save him.
A Season for Miracles	1999	A homeless woman and her niece and nephew attempt to outrun the authorities during the holiday season.
Season's Greetings	1986	Based on the play with the same name. Eight people attend a Christmas party in hope of having a pleasant celebration. However, they encounter various problems.
Silent Mouse	1988	The story behind the writing of the famous Christmas carol by Franz Gruber, Silent Night.
Silent Night	2002	Fact-based World War II story set on Christmas Eve, 1944, finds a German mother and her son seeking refuge in a cabin on the war front.
Silver Bells	2005	A widower who has traveled from Nova Scotia with his children to sell their homegrown Christmas trees in New York City meets a photographer who hasn't celebrated Christmas since the year her husband died.
Single All the Way	2021	Desperate to avoid his family's judgment about being single, Peter persuades best friend Nick to pose as his boyfriend on a trip home for the holidays.
Single Santa Seeks Mrs. Claus	2004	A high-flying career woman and single mother with no time for love or Christmas is unexpectedly wooed by Santa's son and heir, Nick who must find a wife before Christmas because his father wants to retire.
A Smoky Mountain Christmas	1986	A singer retreats to an isolated mountain cabin for a quiet holiday, but finds seven orphaned children there.
Snow	2004	With only three days before Christmas, Nick Snowden, heir to a certain Arctic toy business, must work hard to save Christmas after someone steals Buddy the reindeer and takes him to a California zoo.
Snow 2: Brain Freeze	2008	Sequel to 2004's Snow.
A Snow Capped Christmas	2016	Also known as Falling For Christmas. A figure skater meets a former ice hockey player.
Snow Wonder	2005	Adapted from the short story "Just Like the Ones We Used to Know" by Connie Willis.
Snowglobe	2007	A young woman discovers a Christmas-themed dreamworld inside a magical snow globe.
The Sons of Mistletoe	2001	A cold businesswoman threatens to close boys' foster home during the holidays when she returns to her hometown to settle her late father's estate.
Special Delivery	2000	A bumbling courier at a private adoption agency botches the delivery of a baby to its new parents in time for Christmas when he misplaces their baby en route.
Stealing Christmas	2003	A criminal hides in a small town and takes a job as a Santa.
Three Days	2001	An angel offers a literary agent, whose wife of ten years died just before Christmas, a chance to relive the last three days of his wife's life.
Three Wise Guys	2005	Three gangsters are hired as hitmen during the Christmas season.
To Grandmother's House We Go	1992	Twin sisters believe their mother would be better off with a break from them for Christmas so they decide to go visit their grandmother, and their adventures along the way.
A Town Without Christmas	2001	A child of divorcing parents writes a suicidal letter to Santa, prompting a community search. Followed by Finding John Christmas and When Angels Come to Town.
Trading Christmas	2013	A widowed Washington mother and a Boston novelist decide to swap houses for Christmas.
The True Meaning of Christmas Specials	2002	Broadcast on CBC and hosted by Dave Foley, this parody of Christmas specials and many Christmas stories follows David and friends as he seeks to learn the meaning of Christmas Specials, beyond selling knickknacks for $49.99.
'Twas the Night	2001	A mischievous 14-year-old boy and his irresponsible uncle almost ruin Christmas when they decide to take Santa's new high-tech sleigh for a joyride.
Twice Upon a Christmas	2001	Santa's daughter has lost her memory, and her new family is determined to help her get it back.
The Ultimate Christmas Present	2000	A girl steals a weather machine from Santa Claus to make it snow on Christmas Day, but the machine breaks and causes an out-of-control snowstorm.
Undercover Christmas	2003	An FBI agent visits his parents for the holidays, with the waitress he's protecting posing as his girlfriend.
Unlikely Angel	1996	A singer must work with St Peter to earn her wings at Christmas by reuniting a family.
A Very Brady Christmas	1988	The entire Brady family manages to overcome personal obstacles to spend a happy holiday together. Follow up-to The Brady Bunch and The Brady Brides.
A Very Jonas Christmas Movie	2025	Kevin, Joe and Nick embark on a chaotic adventure to make it back home to their families before the holidays.
A Very Merry Mix-Up	2013	Shop owner Alice Chapman is nervous about meeting her future in-laws at Christmas, especially because she is arriving ahead of her new fiancé, Will Mitchum. Alice's trip becomes more stressful when her luggage is lost and her phone is damaged, leaving her no way to find Will's family!
When Angels Come to Town	2004	Max the Angel finds himself helping two different families as Christmas approaches.
White Reindeer	2013	After the brutal murder of her husband, a young woman must find a way to put her life back together during the Christmas season.
Wigilia	2014	A Polish cleaner stranded in Glasgow for Christmas prepares her Wigilia (Christmas Eve Feast) in her empty boss's house, when an unexpected visitor arrives at the house.
Will You Merry Me?	2008	A Lifetime film, in which a newly engaged couple, one Christian and the other Jewish, must survive their family meeting for the first time during Christmas.
The Winter Stallion	1992	A man returns to Wales and tries to save his late father's farm from developers by entering a prize stallion in a Christmas race.
Wishin' and Hopin'	2014	Coming of age Lifetime comedy set in 1964 – Felix Funicello and his fifth-grade class at St. Aloysius Gonzaga Parochial School have a momentous fall semester after a substitute teacher and a new student from Russia arrive. Competition ensues for key roles in the school's Christmas pageant.
The Year Without a Santa Claus	2006	Live-action remake of the 1971 animated special by NBC. Thoroughly disgruntled, Santa (John Goodman) opts to take a year off from delivering presents, until a young man (Dylan Minnette) helps him rediscover the meaning of the holidays.
Yes, Virginia, there is a Santa Claus	1991	Based on the true story of an editorial by Francis Pharcellus Church replying to a letter by eight-year-old Virginia O'Hanlon on "Is There a Santa Claus?" Her father is unemployed and cannot afford Christmas presents for his children. He tells his children that Santa does not exist, which prompts Virginia to write her letter to the New York newspaper The Sun. Starring Richard Thomas, Ed Asner, and Charles Bronson.
Your Christmas or Mine?	2022	Hayley and James are young and in love. After a disastrous mix-up, the young couple end up having to experience each other's family Christmas without their partner.

=== A Christmas Carol adaptations ===
A Christmas Carol is an 1843 novella by Charles Dickens.

Title	Year	Description
A Christmas Carol	1954	Starring Fredric March as Scrooge and Basil Rathbone as Marley, this adaptation was produced by Shower of Stars.
A Carol for Another Christmas	1964	This modernization of A Christmas Carol was produced to promote American support for the United Nations.
An American Christmas Carol	1979	In this adaptation of Dickens' A Christmas Carol, the "Scrooge" figure is a miserly businessman in Depression-era New England.
Rich Little's Christmas Carol	1979	Comedian Rich Little plays all of the characters, using his unique skills as an impressionist to apparently fill the cast with some of Hollywood's best-known stars.
A Christmas Carol	1984	Starring George C. Scott as Ebenezer Scrooge, an old miser who makes excuses for his uncaring nature learns real compassion when three ghosts visit him on Christmas Eve.
Ebbie	1995	A TV movie that brought the first portrayal of Scrooge as a female, with Susan Lucci as Elizabeth "Ebbie" Scrooge, owner of a huge department store, and some of her own employees doubling as the three Christmas Spirits.
Ebenezer	1998	Western adaptation of A Christmas Carol has Scrooge (Jack Palance) as a corrupt land baron in the Old West.
Ms. Scrooge	1997	A TV movie starring Cicely Tyson as "Ebenita Scrooge", the managing director of a loan company, and Katherine Helmond as her deceased business partner Maude Marley.
A Christmas Carol	1999	A Hallmark Channel adaptation of the famous story. Starring Patrick Stewart as Ebenezer Scrooge and Richard E. Grant as Bob Cratchit.
A Diva's Christmas Carol	2000	A TV movie that premiered on VH1, now on Lifetime, portraying Vanessa Williams in the Scrooge role as "Ebony" Scrooge, one-third of a late-'80's pop trio called "Desire" and now an egotistical, arrogant, grouchy solo diva.
A Carol Christmas	2003	Another TV movie portraying Scrooge as an arrogant female celebrity, this time as a TV star named "Carol Cartman", played by Tori Spelling, with her own talk show. Also featured were Dinah Manoff as Marla, Carol's stage-mother type aunt, and two of the three Christmas Spirits portrayed by Gary Coleman (Christmas Past) and William Shatner (Christmas Present).
A Christmas Carol	2004	Kelsey Grammer is Scrooge in this musical adaptation of the Dickens story.
It's Christmas, Carol!	2012	A workaholic businesswoman is visited by the Ghosts of Christmas Past, Present, and Future in a modern update of A Christmas Carol.

=== Christmas animals ===
Title	Year	Description
Alone for Christmas (aka Bone Alone)	2013	When a family visits Grandma's house on Christmas Eve, they leave their dog at home alone. When three thieves try to take the presents from under the Christmas tree, the dog must use every trick it knows to stop them.
Benji's Very Own Christmas Story	1978	Popular screen pooch meets Kris Kringle while preparing for a Christmas parade in Switzerland.
A Dog Named Christmas	2009	A young man decides to spread some Christmas cheer after adopting an adorable golden Labrador for the holidays.
The Dog Who Saved Christmas	2009	The Bannister family's new addition, Zeus, a yellow Labrador, appears to be less than the dependable guard dog the family needs. However, when two burglars set out to break into the Bannister's home while they're away for Christmas, Zeus seizes the chance to be a hero.
The Dog Who Saved Christmas Vacation	2010	Crime-busting dog Zeus is taken to a remote mountain lodge for his owners' Christmas getaway, where he makes a new friend in the shape of a pampered poodle. The canine duo work together to foil the plans of two jewel thieves.
A Doggone Christmas	2016	A dog with telepathic powers is hunted down by the CIA near Christmas time.
Grumpy Cat's Worst Christmas Ever	2014	A curmudgeonly kitty living in a mall pet shop helps a little girl find the spirit and charm of Christmas, in a holiday adventure.
Santa Buddies	2009	Puppy Paws, the only son of Santa Paws, does not want to follow in his father's footsteps. He then hi-tails it to Fernfield, Washington to be a normal puppy, just like Budderball (who is on Santa's naughty list for eating the Thanksgiving Turkey). Meanwhile, the icicle that holds the magic of Christmas is melting away due to children's and puppies' belief in Santa and Santa Paws dying. It is up to Puppy Paws and the Buddies to rediscover their belief in Christmas and save the holiday.
Santa Paws 2: The Santa Pups	2012	Sequel to The Search for Santa Paws
The Search for Santa Paws	2010	Prequel to Santa Buddies
Shelby	2014	

=== Children's ===
Title	Year	Description
An All Dogs Christmas Carol	1998	An animated adaptation of Charles Dickens' A Christmas Carol, featuring the cast of All Dogs Go to Heaven.
Annabelle's Wish	1997	A young mute boy is given a calf who aspires to become one of Santa's flying reindeer.
Babes in Toyland	1997	An animated adaptation of the Herbert operetta.
Bah, Humduck! A Looney Tunes Christmas	2006	This animated parody of A Christmas Carol casts Daffy Duck in the Scrooge-like role who owns a very large superstore and on Christmas Eve, he gets visits from Christmas spirits: Granny & Tweety as The Ghosts of Christmas Past, Yosemite Sam as Christmas Present and Taz as Christmas Future to stop mistreating everyone and teach him the spirit of Christmas.
The Bear Who Slept Through Christmas	1973	When all other bears sleep through Christmas, one specific bear named Ted E. Bear is curious about Christmas and discovers the true meaning of the holiday.
Beauty and the Beast: The Enchanted Christmas	1997	When the Beast forbids the celebration of Christmas, Belle and friends show him the true meaning of the holiday in this holiday-themed followup to the animated Disney theatrical film.
Blinky Bill's White Christmas	2005	An animated film about a mischievous koala bear that accidentally breaks his friend's snowdome. To make amends, he decides to give his friend a treat by creating a white Christmas with real snow and a real Christmas tree.
Bugs Bunny's Looney Christmas Tales	1979	An animated adaptation of Dickens' story featuring the Looney Tunes characters, with the role of Scrooge going to Yosemite Sam, The Coyote goes after the Road-Runner across a snowy desert and Taz escapes from a cargo box on an airplane en route to Australia and ends up falling and flying into Santa's outfit at the North Pole and gets mistaken for Santa Claus by Bugs Bunny on Christmas Eve.
Buster & Chauncey's Silent Night	1998	An animated story about the creation of the song "Silent Night".
Caillou's Holiday Movie	2003	This adventure follows Caillou as he helps his family get ready for the holidays and learns what Christmas is like in other countries around the world.
Care Bears Nutcracker Suite	1988	The Care Bears and their Cousins must help a Nutcracker save Toyland from an evil Vizier and his rat minions.
Casper's Haunted Christmas	2000	Casper the Friendly Ghost must scare someone before Christmas Day or be banished from the mortal realm.
A Charlie Brown Christmas	1965	A 28-minute animated special in which Charlie Brown searches for the true meaning of Christmas, by directing a Christmas play while shunning the hyper-commercialization of the holiday.
Charlie Brown's Christmas Tales	2002	Storylines of Snoopy, Linus, Sally, Lucy and Charlie Brown that revolve around Christmas.
A Child's Christmas in Wales	2008	Based on the Dylan Thomas poem. Directed by Dave Unwin and narrated by Matthew Rhys. It has Welsh and English language versions, although I assume both have the same video but different audio. Also, has a couple of live-action sections. It is said to be broadcast on S4C under the title Nadolig Plentyn yng Nghymru. It is a co-production between independent producers Brave New World and Cwmni Da. Alternate title is Nadolig I Blentyn Yng Nghymru.
A Chipmunk Christmas	1981	A sick boy makes Alvin realize the true meaning of Christmas.
A Christmas Dream	1948	Castle Films stop motion and Live-action mixed film about how a wealthy little girl who doesn't appreciate Christmas until she has a dream which changes her attitude. The films was originally released in Czechoslovakia and titled Vánoční sen in 1945.
Christmas Eve on Sesame Street	1978	Big Bird worries when Oscar tells him that if Santa Claus can't fit down the chimney on Christmas Eve, nobody would get presents.
Christmas Is Here Again	2007	A disabled orphan girl sets out to find Santa's stolen toy sack.
The Christmas Toy	1986	Jim Henson tale of toys who come to life on Christmas Eve.
Christopher's Christmas Mission	1975	Young Karl-Bertil dreams of becoming a modern-day Robin Hood. He spends the Christmas holiday working at the Post Office and makes sure that some of the Christmas gifts to the wealthy people are distributed to the less fortunate of the society.
A Cosmic Christmas	1977	Three aliens visit Earth to learn about the true meaning of Christmas.
The Cricket On the Hearth	1967	Rankin/Bass Productions television adaptation, loosely based on the Charles Dickens' 1845 novella.
Elf: Buddy's Musical Christmas	2014	A stop motion retelling of the 2003 film Elf.
Elmo Saves Christmas	1996	Inspired by the 1892 short story "Christmas Every Day" by William Dean Howells, Elmo learns that this Christmas does not occur every day.
Elmo's Christmas Countdown	2007	Sesame Street characters help Elmo count down the days leading up to Christmas.
Emmet Otter's Jug-Band Christmas	1977	Jim Henson's telling of the true meaning of Christmas based around a struggling mother and son who each sacrifice an item of great importance to give the other the perfect gift for Christmas.
Father Christmas	1991	The story of what Father Christmas does the 'other' 364 days a year.
The First Christmas: The Story of the First Christmas Snow	1975	Stop Motion special.
A Flintstones Christmas Carol	1994	The Flintstones version of Charles Dickens' 1843 novella A Christmas Carol as a play with Fred as Scrooge and everybody else in respective roles.
The Forgotten Toys	1995	Animated special, based on the children's book The Night After Christmas by James Stevenson; a teddy bear and a rag doll embark on journey to find a new home and owners, overcoming complicated obstacles along the way. A sequel series to the special was broadcast from 1997 until 1999.
Frosty Returns	1992	Animated special. A Summer Wheeze aerosol spray threatens Frosty.
Frosty the Snowman	1969	Animated special, adapted from the famous song. Magic that brings a snowman to life.
Frosty's Winter Wonderland	1976	Sequel to 1969 Frosty the Snowman special.
A Garfield Christmas	1987	Animated special. Garfield, Jon, and Odie go to Jon's grandmother's house for Christmas, where Garfield finds a present for Grandma.
Gift of the Night Fury	2011	The Vikings are prepared to celebrate their annual holiday when all of a sudden all the dragons disappear, now Hiccup must figure out why while also trying to make a gift for Toothless.
Holly Hobbie and Friends: Christmas Wishes	2006	Animated special. Holly Hobbie and her friends help a widow and her twin boys to celebrate the Christmas holidays.
How the Grinch Stole Christmas!	1966	Animated musical. A mean and stingy green creature wants to ruin Christmas.
How the Toys Saved Christmas	1996	The story follows some toys as they struggle to avoid the heartless Mr. Grimm, that plans to auction off the toys to the highest bidder, and to find their true homes.
I Want a Dog for Christmas, Charlie Brown	2003	Rerun Van Pelt wants a dog for Christmas but his mom will not allow him to have one because it's a lot of work caring for a pet; Snoopy's brother Spike visits for the holidays and Rerun wants to have him for a pet.
It's a Very Merry Muppet Christmas Movie	2002	Kermit is shown what life would be like for the rest of the Muppets without him, in this spoof of It's a Wonderful Life.
It's Christmastime Again, Charlie Brown	1992	12 storylines of the Peanuts gang that revolve around the Christmas season.
Jack Frost	1979	Stop Motion A Groundhog named Pete tells the story of how Jack Frost wanted to become human so he can fall in love.
John Denver and the Muppets: A Christmas Together	1979	The Muppets join the singer for Christmas songs and sketches.
Kung Fu Panda Holiday	2010	Po is put in charge of hosting a holiday feast for other Kung Fu Masters, but wants to try to spend the holiday with his dad.
The Leprechauns' Christmas Gold	1981	Rankin/Bass story of a Leprechaun at Christmas. Features the song Christmas in Killarney
The Life and Adventures of Santa Claus	1985	Stop Motion Rankin/Bass Special. The Great Ak calls a council of the Immortals to ask that Santa Claus be given immortality. And to justify it, he tells the history of Santa Claus.
The Life and Adventures of Santa Claus	2000	A human orphan raised by the Faire Folke becomes the benefactor of all human children.
Little Brother, Big Trouble: A Christmas Adventure	2012	A sequel to Niko and the Way to the Stars.
The Little Drummer Boy	1968	Stop Motion special. An orphan drummer boy who hates humanity finds his life changed forever when he meets three wise men en route to Bethlehem.
The Little Drummer Boy, Book II	1976	Sequel to 1968 The Little Drummer Boy special.
The Little Lamb	1955	Castle Films live-action retelling of the Birth of Jesus. Originally released as The Lamb in the Manger (1953).
The Little Match Girl	1954	Castle Films live-action retelling of Hans Christian Andersen's story The Little Match Girl.
The Little Troll Prince	1987	A troll prince journeys from his home to learn the true meaning of Christmas.
Magic Gift of the Snowman	1995	Animated film. A magical snowman takes two children on the adventure of a lifetime.
The Magic Snowflake	2013	Animated film. A young boy named Nicholas is about to become the next Santa Claus, but he must first avoid a crisis that's threatening the magic of Christmas. Sequel to Santa's Apprentice.
A Martian Christmas	2009	
Merry Christmas	1941	Castle Films live-action story Santa's journey from his workshop to the house of children.
Merry Little Batman	2023	Damian Wayne, Bruce Wayne's son, is left home alone on Christmas Eve.
Mickey's Magical Christmas: Snowed in at the House of Mouse	2001	A snowstorm leaves everyone stranded and Donald has no Christmas spirit so Minnie comes up with the idea to show old Christmas cartoons.
Mickey's Once Upon a Christmas	1999	In this three-segment film, Huey, Dewey, and Louie relive Christmas Day over and over by a wish, Goofy tries to prove to Max that Santa exists, and Mickey and Minnie attempt to get gifts for each other after Mickey loses his job.
Mickey's Twice Upon a Christmas	2004	In this five-segment film, Minnie and Daisy have a battle during an ice show, Huey, Dewey and Louie travel to the North Pole to get off the naughty list, Max pays a visit back home for the holidays with his girlfriend Mona and doesn't want Goofy to embarrass him, Donald becomes a Christmas grump when he keeps hearing We Wish You a Merry Christmas everywhere and rather enjoy a cup of hot chocolate and Mickey gets mad when Pluto accidentally ruins his Christmas display, so Pluto runs away and ends up on a train to the North Pole and becomes a new "reindeer" for Santa Claus.
A Miser Brothers' Christmas	2008	Stop Motion sequel to The Year Without a Santa Claus. After Santa is injured, Heat Miser and Snow Miser must put aside their differences and work together to save Christmas.
Mister Magoo's Christmas Carol	1962	An animated and musical adaptation of Charles Dickens' famous book, A Christmas Carol, with Mr. Magoo as Scrooge.
The Muppet Christmas Carol	1992	The Muppets version of Charles Dickens' 'A Christmas Carol'.
A Muppet Family Christmas	1987	Kermit and his friends spend Christmas staging a surprise visit to Fozzie Bear's mother's farm. Muppets from both The Muppet Show and Sesame Street are featured, as are Fraggles. Includes a rare cameo appearance by Jim Henson himself.
A Muppets Christmas: Letters to Santa	2008	After mistakenly intercepting three letters sent by children to Santa Claus, the Muppets must head for the North Pole to get them delivered before Christmas.
My Little Pony: A Very Minty Christmas	2005	Minty accidentally breaks the glowing "here comes Christmas candy cane" that traditionally leads Santa through the clouds to Ponyville. Horrified that she has ruined Christmas for the entire village, Minty embarks on a perilous journey to the North Pole.
Nestor, the Long-Eared Christmas Donkey	1977	Stop Motion special.
The Night Before Christmas	1946	Castle Films' live-action retelling of Clement Clarke Moore's story "A Visit from St. Nicholas".
Niko & The Way to the Stars (known as The Flight Before Christmas in North America)	2008	A young reindeer must overcome his fear of flying.
The Night Before Christmas in Wonderland	2024	St. Nick travels to Wonderland to help save Christmas after the Queen of Hearts had outlawed it.
Nilus the Sandman: The Boy Who Dreamed Christmas	1991	While dreaming, a boy is taken by the Sandman to the North Pole to visit Santa Claus, but once there he discovers that children's increasing demand for more toys has forced Santa out of work, and Santa's duties are now performed by a robotic clown and his industrialized high-tech factory.
Olive, the Other Reindeer	1999	A dog called Olive wants to be a reindeer at Christmas time and goes on a trip to go to the North Pole and befriends a con artist penguin and meets a troublesome postman.
Pinocchio's Christmas	1980	Rankin/Bass adaptation of the 1883 novel The Adventures of Pinocchio by Carlo Collodi and which explores Pinocchio's first Christmas.
Rudolph and Frosty's Christmas in July	1979	Stop motion featuring characters from previous Rankin/Bass Christmas specials including Rudolph the Red-Nosed Reindeer, Frosty the Snowman, Santa Claus, Mrs Claus, and Jack Frost.
Rudolph, the Red-Nosed Reindeer	1964	Stop-motion adaptation of the popular song. Rudolph, and Hermey the Misfit Elf, overcome rejection for their differences and help Santa Claus make his Christmas Eve trip.
Rudolph the Red-Nosed Reindeer and the Island of Misfit Toys	2001	Sequel to Rudolph, the Red-Nosed Reindeer (1964).
Rudolph's Shiny New Year	1976	Rudolph helps Father Time find Baby New Year so that the New Year can start.
Santa and the Fairy Snow Queen	1951	The Fairy Snow Queen comes to visit Santa and when she finds him sleeping, she plays a trick on him by bringing the toys to life. When Santa wakes up, he asks her to change them back, she can't do it, because the toys don't want to change back. so the Fairy Snow Queen must help Santa find a solution.
Santa, Baby!	2001	A struggling songwriter in danger of losing his job and his angelic daughter's attempts to keep a wacky bunch of shelter animals safe from the cold. Through their efforts, the dysfunctional neighborhood comes together to help one another and embrace the Christmas spirit.
Santa Claus and the Magic Drum	1996	While reading his usual gift wish mail Santa Claus stumbles upon an unusual letter which everyone assumes to be a gift wish letter from a boy called Vekara, at the same time odd things are happening around Santa's village, and strange accidents follow Santa.
Santa Claus is Comin' to Town	1970	Stop Motion A mailman tells the story of how a young orphan Claus is adopted by elves and tries to bring toys to sad children in a town where toys are banned.
Santa's Apprentice	2010	Animated film. When the time for him to retire draws near, Santa Claus selects and trains a young orphan boy to become his successor.
Saving Santa	2013	A stable elf is the only one who can stop an invasion of the North Pole by using Santa's sleigh and a time globe to go back in time to save Santa.
Scooby-Doo! Haunted Holidays	2012	While participating in a Menkle's Toy Store's holiday parade, Scooby and the gang discover a haunted clock tower with a sinister past.
Shrek the Halls	2007	Animated special. Shrek prepares to celebrate Christmas with his family, but gets disrupted by Donkey and friends and reveals that he never really had a Christmas and knows nothing about it.
The Smurfs: A Christmas Carol	2011	Grouchy Smurf is at his grouchiest during the holiday season, so he gets visits from three Christmas spirits (in the form of Smurfs) to teach him to get into the Christmas spirit.
The Snow Queen	1957	Lev Atamanov animated adaptation film based on the 1844 fable "The Snow Queen" by Hans Christian Andersen, about a girl's quest to find her kidnapped friend in an evil queen's icy abode.
The Snow Queen	1995	Animated film based on the 1844 fable "The Snow Queen" by Hans Christian Andersen, about a girl's quest to find her kidnapped brother in an evil queen's icy abode in the North Pole. Featuring the voice of Helen Mirren in the title role.
The Snow Queen's Revenge	1996	Animated film. Sequel to 1995 animation film The Snow Queen. The Snow Queen is angry with the little girl, who thwarted her plan to make the earth the cold place and she seeks revenge on the little girl.
The Snowman	1982	The tale of a boy who builds a snowman one winter's day. One night, at the stroke of twelve, the snowman comes to life and takes him on a magical adventure to the North Pole.
A Special Sesame Street Christmas	1978	Three spirits help Oscar learn the joys of Christmas.
The Stingiest Man in Town	1978	Rankin/Bass version of Charles Dickens's 1843 novella A Christmas Carol.
Super Sleuth Christmas Movie	2007	Pooh and his friends discover Santa's magical bag and one of his reindeers and they embark on a journey to help him get back to the North Pole and return the sack to save Christmas.
The Swan Princess: Christmas	2012	Princess Odette, Prince Derek, and their trusted woodland friends return for their first Christmas celebration! But with the villainous Rothbart striving to destroy Christmas itself, will they be able to stop him and save the day?
The Tailor of Gloucester	1989	A poor tailor must complete the mayor's commissioned cherry-coloured silk coat for his wedding on Christmas Day.
That Christmas	2024	Second Locksmith Animation CGI animation film based on That Christmas and Other Stories by Richard Curtis; A snowstorm blizzard in the fictional seaside town of Wellington-on-Sea in Suffolk, England alters Santa Claus's Christmas plans as well as the town's people's Christmas plans.
The Trolls and the Christmas Express	1981	A group of trolls infiltrates Santa's workshop to attempt to sabotage Christmas.
Tukiki and His Search for a Merry Christmas	1979	Tukiki is a small Eskimo boy who sets out to discover the meaning of Christmas along with a magical character known as North Wind.
'Twas the Night Before Christmas	1974	A mouse and a clockmaker try to appease a disgruntled Santa after he has received an insulting letter.
Urkel Saves Santa: The Movie!	2023	Brilliant but accident-prone Steve Urkel causes chaos while trying to fix a mistake. He must go find Santa Claus to see if together they can help the city of Chicago rediscover the holiday spirit.
Veggietales: The Little Drummer Boy	2011	An animated adaptation of Rankin/Bass story featuring the VeggieTales characters.
VeggieTales: The Star of Christmas	2002	Playwrights Cavis Appythart (Bob the Tomato) and Millward Phelps (Larry the Cucumber) attempt to teach London to love through a musical spectacular but are threatened when they learn that a nearby church will be re-unveiling a priceless artifact during its Christmas pageant on Christmas Eve, Cavis and Millward's opening night.
VeggieTales: The Toy That Saved Christmas	1996	Grandpa George (In a role similar to S.D. Kluger from Santa Claus Is Comin' to Town) tells a bedtime story to his granddaughter Annie. In the story, Mr. Nezzer is the owner of a toy company that makes "Buzz-Saw Louie", who tells kids to get more toys. As Buzz-Saw Louie dolls roll off the production line, one of them inexplicably comes to life and escapes the factory to search for the true meaning of Christmas.
Will Vinton's A Claymation Christmas Celebration	1987	A stop motion claymation featuring the California Raisins and many Christmas songs.
The Willows in Winter	1996	Animated film. Based on the 1993 book by William Horwood, of the same name. It is the sequel to 1995 animation film, The Wind in the Willows. Mole disappears while answering what he thinks is an urgent summons from Rat, causing Badger to enlist help from Toad and his new airplane in a frantic search party.
Winnie the Pooh and Christmas Too	1991	When Christopher Robin's letter to Santa doesn't get delivered, Pooh dresses up as Santa to deliver his friends' presents. Unfortunately, the presents he makes for them are disastrous disappointments.
Winnie the Pooh: Seasons of Giving	1999	Pooh and the gang experiences the seasons of autumn and winter.
Winnie the Pooh: A Very Merry Pooh Year	2002	Pooh and the gang are looking forward to New Year's and make resolutions, while Rabbit plans on moving away when his friends cause mayhem around him.
The Year Without a Santa Claus	1974	(Stop Motion) Santa decides to take a holiday one year. So, Mrs. Claus corrals Heat Miser and Snow Miser, along with children of the world, to show Santa that people still believe in him.
Yes, Virginia	2009	CGI animated version of Yes Virginia, aired on CBS and produced in association with Macy's and Make-A-Wish Foundation.
Yes, Virginia, there is a Santa Claus	1974	An animated account of young Virginia.
Yogi's First Christmas	1980	Animated film. Yogi, Boo Boo and Cindy are awakened from hibernation and join their friends' Christmas activities while interfering with two villains' efforts to ruin the holiday.
Ziggy's Gift	1982	Ziggy and his faithful dog Fuzz take a job as a street Santa to raise money for the poor.

=== Comedy ===
Title	Year	Description
The Funny Side of Christmas	1982	A Christmas television special, which comprised one comedy sketch each from 10 contemporaneous BBC comedy series: Butterflies, The Fall and Rise of Reginald Perrin, Last of the Summer Wine, The Les Dawson Show, Only Fools and Horses, Open All Hours, Smith and Jones, Sorry!, Three of a Kind, and Yes Minister.

=== Horror ===
Title	Year	Description
Female Trouble	1974	A spoiled school girl runs away from home, gets pregnant while hitch-hiking, and starts a life of crime.
Jack Frost	1997	A serial killer is turned into a snowman.
Jack Frost 2: Revenge of the Mutant Killer Snowman	2000	Taking place one year after the events of its predecessor, the film again follows killer snowman Jack Frost (Scott MacDonald), who is resurrected and travels to a tropical cabana to kill the man (Christopher Allport) responsible for his death.
Carnage for Christmas	2024	When true-crime podcaster and sleuth trans woman Lola visits her hometown at Christmas for the first time since running away and transitioning, the vengeful ghost of a historical murderer and urban legend seemingly arises to kill again.
Krampus: The Reckoning	2015	The film stars Monica Engesser as a child psychologist who is attempting to unravel the link between a mysterious young girl (Amelia Haberman) and the mythological creature known as Krampus (William Connor).
Krampus Unleashed	2016	A family is terrorized by Krampus while visiting relatives for Christmas.
Puppet Master vs Demonic Toys	2004	A group of toymakers seek to use Andre Toulon's formula, now in the hands of Toulon's great-nephew Robert (Corey Feldman), to give life to a line of killer toys that they plan to unleash on Christmas Eve.
Santa Jaws	2018	Trying not to spend time with his family during Christmas, Cody makes a wish by drawing a shark wearing a Santa Claus hat, until the animal manifests itself and starts killing the local population.
The Spirit of Christmas	1992	Jesus vs. Frosty, a group of four boys are making their own Frosty the Snowman, only for it to come alive and kill Cartman (as Kenny). While getting help from Santa, he also kills one of the boys. The other two get help from Jesus, as he slices off Frosty's hat.
The Spirit of Christmas	1995	Jesus vs. Santa, a group of four boys go to the mall with Jesus Christ to attack Santa. During the fight, Brian Boitano comforts the boys, Jesus, and Santa, and tells them that Christmas should be about being good to one another.

== TV series ==
=== Comedy ===
Title	Year	Description
How to Ruin Christmas	2020	Tumi returns to Johannesburg from Cape Town to celebrate her sister Beauty's wedding which takes place at Christmas.
Merry Happy Whatever	2019	Don Quinn (Quaid) struggles with different stresses of Christmas.
A Moody Christmas	2012	Dan Moody returns home from London to spend each Christmas with his dysfunctional family.
The Moodys	2021	Remake of A Moody Christmas. A tight-knit but slightly dysfunctional family of five gather in their hometown of Chicago for the "perfect" holiday.
Over Christmas	2020	Basti returns home for Christmas only to find out that his ex engaged to his brother.
Santa Inc.	2021	A female elf wants to become the next Santa.

=== Fantasy/superhero ===
Title	Year	Description
A Christmas Carol	2019	A BBC series about Charles Dickens' A Christmas Carol.
Cuento de Navidad	2000–2001	A Christmas Carol adaption and telenovela.
The Guardians of the Galaxy Holiday Special	2022	The Guardians of the Galaxy search for a Christmas present.
Hawkeye	2021	Taking place after the events of Avengers: Endgame, it's Christmas time in New York, and all Clint Barton wants is to spend the holidays with his family. However, after meeting young archer Kate Bishop, they both get tangled up in a murder mystery, an underground mob and a much bigger threat.

=== Family ===
Title	Year	Description
The Blessed Midnight	1956	Cavalcade of America episode starring Maureen O'Sullivan. When a boy steals a cake for his beloved aunt on Christmas Eve, his young friend tries to set things straight. Film was also released as Spirit of Christmas.
Bushfire Moon	1987	In the Australian outback, young Ned O'Day is looking forward to Christmas, but because of the drought it won't be very festive. Ned meets a swagman and imagines he is the real Father Christmas.
Christmas by Injunction	1957	The O. Henry Playhouse episode starring Thomas Mitchell, Tommy Kirk and John Doucette. A wealthy prospector did not celebrate Christmas and would not permit women and children to be in his home because he lost his own family ten years before. He begins to open his heart when he meets a young boy who was caught stealing food from his ranch.
A Christmas Carol	1954	Shower of Stars version of Charles Dickens' story. Starring Fredric March as Scrooge and Basil Rathbone as Marley.
Christmas Is Magic	1961	Your Jeweler's Showcase episode starring Robert Hutton and Frances Rafferty. On Christmas Eve, a war veteran with amnesia gets off a train and meets a young war widow and her son.
The Gift	1953	Four Star Playhouse episode starring Charles Boyer and Maureen O'Sullivan. A businessman becomes moody and antagonistic each year at Christmas because it reminds him of his estranged son. His wife secretly celebrates by volunteering taking orphaned children to see Santa and paying for the presents for them.
LasseMajas detektivbyrå	2006	The police inspector organizes a nativity play for Christmas. Several crimes take place among the actors of the play, so the inspector asks the ten-year-old detectives Lasse und Maja for help.
Navidad sin fin	2001–2002	Two children help a village to rescue family Christmas values.
The Santa Clauses	2022–2023	Santa tries to find a replacement Santa before he retires.
A Star Shall Rise	1952	Family Theater episode starring Raymond Burr, John Crawford, and Richard Hale. Based on the journey of the Three Wise Men.
Tidsrejsen	2014	The 13-year-old girl Sofie wishes that her divorced parents get back together before Christmas, so that everyone can celebrate Christmas together.

=== Children's ===
Title	Year	Description
Elves of the Forest	1984–85	The family Santa lives with the elves and wights in a forest in Finland. Based on the Finnish book The Story of Santa Claus.
"Phineas and Ferb Christmas Vacation"	2009	Phineas and Ferb attempt to show gratitude for Santa during Christmas may be doomed for failure, while Dr. Doofenshmirtz uses an invention that puts the entire town of Danville on Santa's naughty list.
Horace and Tina	2001	On Christmas Eve, Santa's little helpers Horace and Tina fall from Santa's sleigh into the house of Lauren Parker. There they have to stay for one year until the next Christmas Eve until Santa can pick them up again.
The Lion, the Witch and the Wardrobe	1988	Little sister Lucy discovers a magical new world called Narnia inside a wardrobe, where because of a White Witch there is always winter but never Christmas.
Peter-No-Tail	1997	The cat Peter and his friends prepare for Christmas, while the cat Frida claims to have seen Santa's sleigh in the park.
SantApprentice	2006	Nicolas, a young orphan boy from Sydney, Australia, who is pure of heart, believes in Santa Claus, as he is Santa's Apprentice.
The Secret World of Santa Claus	1999	Along with his elves, Santa Claus prepares presents for the children.
The Toy Castle	2000–03	The adventures of toys who come to life when no one is watching.

=== Drama ===
Title	Year	Description
Give Love on Christmas	2014–15	
Holiday Secrets	2019	Four women from four generations come home for Christmas.
Three Days of Christmas	2019	Three Days of Christmas shows three Christmases in the lives of four sisters from different decades.

=== Romance ===
Title	Year	Description
Christmas Flow	2021	Shortly before Christmas the singer Marcus releases a misogynistic song, for which he receives a lot of criticism. His manager advises him to release a Christmas song, which Marcus does not like. Meanwhile, Marcus falls in love with Lila, the leader of a feminist group, and spends Christmas with her and her family.
Dash & Lily	2020	Lily is a big Christmas fan and hides a notebook in a bookstore which is found by Dash.
Home for Christmas	2019	Johanne tries to find a boyfriend for Christmas.
Will It Snow for Christmas?	2009–10	A couple who were each other's first love, meet years later and fall passionately in love.

=== Adult/horror/thriller/crime ===
Title	Year	Description
Elves	2021	A family wants to spend Christmas together at an Island which is inhabited by elves who start killing people.
Happy!	2017–19	An injured hitman befriends his kidnapped daughter's imaginary friend, a perky blue flying unicorn.
NOS4A2	2020	In Christmas Village every day is Christmas Day and unhappiness is against the law.
White Christmas	2011	Over the Christmas holidays several people are stranded at elite Soo-sin High School, only to discover that there is a murderer in their midst.

== See also ==
- Christmas by medium
- Christmas horror
- List of Christmas television specials
- List of United States Christmas television specials
- List of Easter films
- List of films about angels
- List of highest-grossing Christmas films
- List of United States Christmas television episodes
- Santa Claus in film
- List of Christmas albums
