= Mr. Christmas =

Mr. Christmas may refer to

- Mr. Christmas (Joe Diffie album)
- Mr. Christmas (Brett Eldredge album)
- Mr. Christmas (film), a 2004 family Christmas film
- Mr. Christmas, a character in the Mr. Men book series
- Andy Park (Mr. Christmas), British electrician who claims to have celebrated Christmas Day every day since 1993
