= The Small One =

- Original one-sheet poster for The Small One
- Directed by: Don Bluth
- Story by: Vance Gerry; Pete Young
- Based on: The Small One by Charles Tazewell
- Produced by: Don Bluth; Ron Miller (executive)
- Starring: Sean Marshall; William Woodson; Olan Soule; Hal Smith; Joe Higgins; Gordon Jump
- Music by: Robert F. Brunner; Don Bluth; Richard Rich
- Production company: Walt Disney Productions
- Distributed by: Buena Vista Distribution
- Release date: December 16, 1978; (with Pinocchio)
- Running time: 26 minutes
- Language: English

The Small One (also known as A Christmas Miracle in the UK) is a 1978 American animated featurette produced by Walt Disney Productions and released theatrically by Buena Vista Distribution on December 16, 1978, with a re-issue of Pinocchio (1940). The story is based on a 1947 children's book of the same name by Charles Tazewell and was a project for the new generation of Disney animators including Don Bluth, Jerry Rees, Henry Selick, Gary Goldman, and John Pomeroy.

The story tells of a young boy outside Nazareth, who must part with his best friend, an old donkey named Small One. He brings it to market, but no one is in need of a "scrawny donkey", except for a tanner.

== Plot ==
In the Galilean countryside near the city of Nazareth, Herodian kingdom, a young boy and his father own four donkeys. One donkey, Small One, is so old and weak, he cannot adequately do his job of carrying the wood collected by the boy's father. The boy loads Small One with the smallest sticks, and helps him to carry them. One evening, the boy's father says that he has to sell Small One because he cannot do enough work to cover the cost of his care. Devastated by the news, the boy volunteers to take the donkey to be sold so that he can try to find him a caring master. The father agrees and tells him that he has to sell him for one piece of silver.

The next morning, the boy takes Small One to the market. At first they are tricked into visiting the local tanner by a Roman guard at the city gates. Terrified, they run out of the shop when they discover he only wants the donkey's hide. As they wander the streets looking for a buyer, they encounter several townspeople, shop owners, and merchants, none of whom want to buy. At last, the boy leads Small One onto the stage at a horse auction. The auctioneer has no interest in selling a "scrawny donkey", which causes the boy to insist that Small One is "good enough to be in a king's stable". This prompts the auctioneer and the crowd to laugh and poke fun. When the auctioneer attempts to sit on Small One, shoving the boy out of the way, Small One rouses the strength to buck and kick the auctioneer off him, sending him crashing into the stage and knocking it over.

The boy and Small One run away, and sit at a street corner hopelessly weeping. At this moment, a compassionate man comes up to the boy and asks if Small One is for sale. He needs a gentle donkey to carry his wife to Bethlehem, insists he will take good care of him, and offers one piece of silver. The boy accepts, says goodbye to Small One, and watches as the couple and Small One leave on their journey as a bright star appears in the sky.

== Characters ==
- Small One: He is a gentle donkey past his prime. Long years of working hard have made him weak. Though he eats as much as the other donkeys, he cannot handle the same loads. His right ear never likes to stay straight up, giving him that "Disney cuteness" rating. He has strong feelings for the Boy and would give his life to help him, as he almost does at the tanner's.
- Boy: He is about nine years old. Although he takes care of all the donkeys, Small One is his favorite. When his father tells him to sell Small One, the boy is devastated. Soon he accepts it. Though he loves the donkey, he accepts what his father tells him. He assures Small One will have a gentle and loving master and he does.
- Father: The boy's father is not seen much at all. He is the one who sends the boy to sell Small One. He loves his son and deep down, he cares for Small One too, but he knows they cannot afford to keep a donkey that cannot carry a large load. He owes money to the Three Merchants, which may impact his decision to profit from Small One's gradual enfeeblement.
- Three Merchants: These three men, one tall and skinny, one medium and skinny, and the last short and round, walk around the marketplace taking money from people, "for the bank". They are the ones who point the boy to the auctioneer.
- Auctioneer: He auctions horses in the market. At first he is angered that the boy brings Small One onto the stage and slightly embarrasses him. However, when the boy tells him what Small One can do, the man changes his mind and is intrigued, especially when the boy tells him that Small One is "good enough to be in a King's stable". With that, he decides to have some fun. He mocks and almost injures Small One with his weight. But when Small One sees his best friend pushed aside, he regains his strength and throws the man off of his back. The auctioneer then chases them away.
- The Tanner: A minor antagonist, he kills animals to make leather from their skins to sell or barter in his shop.
- The three donkeys: Small One's barn mates. They seem jealous that the boy spends more time with Small One than them.
- Joseph: The man who buys The Small One at the end of the film. Though his name is never mentioned, from the context (he states that he needs a donkey to carry his wife to Bethlehem) he is obviously the husband of Mary, mother of Jesus.
- The Potter: a minor character who is first seen doing his job, making clay pots. The boy comes by to ask him if he wants to buy Small One, but the Potter refuses, saying that he's nothing but "a sorry bag of bones" and that he has "buyers by the dozens - and their mother and their cousins". He then tells the boy to go away.
- The Baker: a minor character who is first seen doing his job, baking bagels. The boy comes by to ask him if he wants to buy Small One, but the baker refuses, saying that he is a "scrawny undernourished little beast" and that his large and obese wife is a "healthy size", so he will buy a horse instead.

== Cast ==
- Sean Marshall as the Boy
- Olan Soule as the Boy's Father
- William Woodson as the Tanner
- Hal Smith as the Auctioneer
- Joe Higgins as the Guard
- Gordon Jump as Joseph
- Thurl Ravenscroft (uncredited) as the Potter
- Ken Sansom (uncredited) as the Baker

== Production ==
By the early 1970s, several of Disney's senior animators had either died or retired, but the continuous success of their recently released animated films convinced studio executives that the animation department was still lucrative but in desperate need for new talent. Veteran animator Eric Larson (of Disney's Nine Old Men) was selected to head the training program, in which he selected and trained graduates from colleges and art schools across the United States. Eventually, 25 new artists were hired between 1970 and 1977. Ron Husband was promoted to Disney's first African-American animator while working on the project.

The idea for The Small One originated from Pete Young, then an apprentice story artist, who found the book among the studio's optioned properties in their library. Rights to the book were previously purchased in 1960 by Walt Disney. He developed the initial storyboards at home, and pitched it to Ron Miller who claimed it to be a story with "heart". To help polish the storyboards, Miller selected Vance Gerry, a veteran storyboard artist, to collaborate with Young. Larson had assumed he would be directing the film and brought Burny Mattinson to help reboard the story, as well as veteran animator Cliff Nordberg to help assist on the animation. According to Mattinson, the team left on Friday for the weekend, and returned on Monday to have their work tossed out because studio management had selected Don Bluth to direct. Then-animator Betsy Baytos claimed Larson, in reaction to the news, "just shook his head and knew that he wasn't being appreciated. He felt the old days were gone".

In retrospect, Bluth stated that "Small One was something I directed to get the crew busy until Pete's Dragon ... [Larson] might have [been involved] in the storyboard area. [But he] didn't get to direction. I think he elected to [teach]". Bluth supervised all aspects of the production, including heavily revising the storyline that it frustrated Young. His friend Steve Hulett remembered: "He thought they had missed a lot of the points that he and Vance had made in their original boards." Young left the production and worked on The Fox and the Hound (1981). Given the allotted production budget, Bluth composed two songs himself with a third song composed by assistant director Richard Rich. Animation of the Laughing Men from The Sword in the Stone (1963) and Mowgli from The Jungle Book (1967) was recycled for the short film.

Three songs were written by Don Bluth and Richard Rich for the film. They are “The Small One,” “A Friendly Face,” and “The Market Song”.

== Release ==
The Small One was released on December 16, 1978, accompanying a reissue of Pinocchio (1940). Charles Solomon, in his Los Angeles Times review, wrote: "The film has its flaws: The script and the songs are a bit saccharine, and the human characters, except for the boy, are far less interesting in their design and movements than the animals, but The Small One is characterized by the same qualities of light, perspective and atmosphere that made the great Disney films so vivid." That same year, on December 23, the film had its television premiere on HBO.

== Home media ==
On September 27, 2005, Disney released The Small One for the first time on Region 1 DVD as part of Walt Disney's Classic Cartoon Favorites: Volume 9: Classic Holiday Stories. This DVD also featured Mickey's Christmas Carol (1983) and Pluto's Christmas Tree (1952). The short is edited in two places:

- The star at the end has been given more lines to look less like a cross.
- The song the three merchants sing has had a lyrics change. The lyric "We never, never fail when we go to make a sale, we simply cheat a little if we must" was changed to "We never, never fail when we go to make a sale, we work a little harder if we must". The reason for these edits is not known, but it may have to do with the merchants being "Arab" stereotypes.

This short is also featured on the DVD Walt Disney Animation Collection: Classic Short Films: Volume 7: Mickey's Christmas Carol released on September 29, 2009. It was also released on Region 2 on the 2002 UK DVD Walt Disney Presents Countdown to Christmas.

The title was also made available for streaming and download in the digital format. It is also available on the Disney+ streaming service.

== See also ==
- List of Christmas films
