= The Small One (book) =

Christmas novelette written by Charles Tazewell

- Front cover of The Small One.
- Author: Charles Tazewell
- Language: English
- Published: 1947
- Publication place: USA

The Small One is a 1947 Christmas novelette written by Charles Tazewell and illustrated by Franklin Whitman about a young boy who has to sell his donkey named Small One. It was adapted into the Disney featurette in Christmas 1978.

== Plot ==
The story starts with Padre, who tells his boy Pablo about how donkeys aren't stubborn after Pablo is frustrated with the attitude of his donkey Cupido, who is doing nothing to work for him. Padre tells the story that happened many miles from where they live in El Camino del Norte, Mexico.

In the Galilean countryside near the city of Nazareth, Small One was an old donkey who belonged to a woodcutter, whose son was kinder to him. One day the boy's father tells him to sell Small One to the tanner as he feels there is no use for him, as he is too old to work. The boy insists not to take him to the tanner's, but his father tells him not to cry over a donkey. The boy realizes there's no use arguing, so he goes off to town to sell Small One, but doesn't tell his father that he will sell him elsewhere. The first place he sees is an auction, where the bidder is selling horses. The boy asks the bidder to sell his donkey, but the bidder refuses and he and the crowd make fun of Small One which upsets the boy; the boy then sets off to see who else would buy him.

The boy and Small One both feel hopeless by sundown and decide to go to the tanner's after all. Just then, the boy meets a nice man, who asks him if he can buy Small One, as he and his wife have a long way to go and she isn't very well. The boy sells the man Small One for one piece of silver and hurries to the gates before the guards close it. The boy promises Small One that when he grows up, he will buy him back and keep him. The man explains to the guards at the gate that his name is Joseph, his wife's name is Mary and they are heading to Bethlehem, so they make their way into the distance. In the end, the boy says his last goodbyes to his friend, and Small One, as told by Padre, makes it all the way to Bethlehem with Joseph and Mary and sees the king being born; despite how he was made fun of, the donkey became part of the Christmas miracle.

In the end, Pablo and Padre listen, wondering whether it was a donkey's hooves or the sound of the church bells rehearsing the chimes for Christmas morning, but only Cupido knew what it really was.

== Characters ==
- Small One - the old and weary donkey who made his place at Christmas.
- The Boy - Small One's friend who is kind to him.
- Woodcutter - the Boy's father.
- Auctioneer - a bidder who refused to sell Small One and made fun of him.
- Pablo - the boy who is told by Padre the story of The Small One.
- Padre - the teller of The Small One story that is told to Pablo.
- Cupido - Padre and Pablo's Donkey.
- Joseph - the buyer of Small One who he takes to Bethlehem with Mary riding him.
- Mary - Joseph's wife who rides Small One to Bethlehem.
