= Charles Tazewell =

American children's writer (1900–1972)

- Born: June 2, 1900; Des Moines, Iowa, U.S.
- Died: June 26, 1972 (aged 72); Chesterfield, NH
- Occupations: Actor; radio playwright; writer
- Spouse: Louise Skinner Tazwell
- Writing career
- Language: English
- Period: 1923–1972
- Genre: Children's literature
- Notable works: The Littlest Angel (1945); The Small One (1947)

Charles Tazewell (June 2, 1900 – June 26, 1972) was an American actor, radio playwright, and children's book author, whose work has been adapted multiple times for film.

== Life ==
Charles Tazewell was born in 1900 in Des Moines, Iowa, and began acting while still in high school.

=== Theater ===
In 1923, he had a small part in the Theatre Guild's Peer Gynt at the Garrick Theatre. In 1924, he appeared in the Guild's production of Ernst Toller's Man and the Masses. Later that year, he was in Sidney Howard's They Knew What They Wanted. The play premiered on November 24, 1924, and closed in October 1925, after 192 performances. He followed this the following year with Howard's Lucky Sam McCarver. At this time, he was living at 143 West 72nd St. In 1931, he wrote the book for the short-lived musical Sugar Hill.

=== Writing ===
During the 30s, Tazewell wrote scripts for radio programs, including Downbeat on Murder for the Columbia Workshop. It was broadcast on CBS on June 6, 1937. An experimental series, in Tazewell's play, voices changed into musical notes. He also worked in television, scripting special material for Tennessee Ernie Ford.

Tazewell is perhaps best known for the classic Christmas story The Littlest Angel. In 1939 he wrote an unproduced radio script, which was published in book form in 1945 and became one of the best-selling children's books of all time. It was republished multiple times, and at the time of his death in 1972 The Littlest Angel was in its 38th printing. It was adapted several times for film and radio, most notably as a musical TV drama for the Hallmark Hall of Fame in 1969. The heartwarming tale, written in just three days, is about a small boy's adjustment to being an angel in heaven and his gift to the holy infant. The beloved and enduring Christmas story has been reprinted countless times and translated into many languages.

He wrote other children's books including The Small One, which The Walt Disney Company adapted into the animated short of the same name in 1978, six years after his death. His book The Littlest Snowman was also adapted into a film as a segment of Christmas Fairy Tale (12 minutes). Previously, a shorter adaptation narrated by Bob Keeshan had been annually shown on the CBS children's daytime television show Captain Kangaroo. The Littlest Snowman won the Thomas A. Edison Prize for the best children's story of 1956.

=== Personal ===
He was married to Louise Skinner Tazwell. They lived in Los Angeles before later moving to Chesterfield, New Hampshire. Tazewell was a founder of the Brattleboro Little Theater in nearby Brattleboro, Vermont. His grave can be found at Lindenwood Cemetery, Stoneham, Massachusetts.

== Works ==
- The Littlest Angel (1945)
- The Small One (1947)
- The Littlest Tree
- The Littlest Uninvited One
- The Littlest Red Horse
- The Littlest Snowman (1956)
