= The Littlest Angel =

1946 children's book by Charles Tazewell

- Author: Charles Tazewell
- Illustrator: Katherine Evans
- Genre: Children's book
- Publication date: 1946

The Littlest Angel is an American children's book by Charles Tazewell. It was first published in 1946, illustrated by Katherine Evans. It was reissued with different illustrators in 1962 and 1991. All the versions were published by Children's Press Inc. As of 2001 it was the fifteenth best-selling children's book of all time. In a review of the 1991 edition, School Library Journal called it a "classic Christmas story."

== Plot ==
The story concerns a four-year-old boy who arrives in heaven but is unable to adapt to the heavenly life. He cannot sing, he is always late for prayers, and his robe and halo are always dirty. The other angels are bothered by him and he is miserable and lonely. Finally he is introduced to an Understanding Angel who asks what he really wants. He asks for a box of childhood treasures that he kept under his bed on Earth, and when he gets it he becomes happy and angelic. Then the birth of the Christ Child is announced and all the angels prepare their finest gifts for him. The Littlest Angel decides to give the child his own box of boyhood favorites. This gift pleases God so much that he causes it to mount into the sky, and it becomes the Star of Bethlehem.

== Radio play and book ==
Charles Tazewell wrote the story in just three days in 1939 as a Christmas story for radio. It was first broadcast in 1940 and rebroadcast multiple times, read by narrators including Ethel Barrymore, Helen Hayes, and Loretta Young. The book version, illustrated by Katherine Evans, was published in 1946. It was reissued in 1962 with illustrations by Sergio Leone, and again in 1991 with illustrations by Paul Micich. At the time of Tazewell's death in 1972, The Littlest Angel was in its 38th printing. As of 2001 the book had sold more than 5 million copies.

== Recordings ==
The story was recorded by many well-known actors, including Joan Crawford and Bob Keeshan ("Captain Kangaroo"). Loretta Young made a recording of the story for Decca Records released in 1950. The McGuire Sisters recorded a song based on the story. Bing Crosby also recorded the song for his 1962 album I Wish You a Merry Christmas.

== Films ==
The Littlest Angel was adapted into several films. A semi-animated version of the story (much of the motion created by "panning" the camera across the artwork) was produced in 1950 by Coronet Films, and was widely distributed in 16mm for church and school showings. In 1969 it was presented on NBC as a Hallmark Hall of Fame musical production, and repeated for multiple subsequent Christmas seasons. Johnny Whitaker portrayed the Littlest Angel, with Fred Gwynne as the Understanding Angel (adapted to be Patience, the Guardian Angel); other performers included Cab Calloway, John McGiver, Tony Randall, George Rose, Connie Stevens, and E. G. Marshall as God. The soundtrack album peaked at #33 on Billboard's Best Best For Christmas album chart on December 26, 1970. An animated version was produced in 2011; the voice cast included Caleb Wolfe as the Littlest Angel, Ed Kelly as his dog, and Ron Perlman as God.

== Reviews ==
Margaret Redfield of the Los Angeles Times wrote, "Probably not since Dickens wrote A Christmas Carol has anyone made Christmas so peculiarly his own as Charles Tazewell, author of The Littlest Angel".
