= Mr. Christmas (film) =

- Written by: Beth Brickell
- Directed by: Beth Brickell
- Starring: Jace Mclean; Jen Celene Little; Ireland Rose Maddox; Abigail Kinslow
- Theme music composer: Andrew Mullen
- Country of origin: United States
- Original language: English

Production
- Producers: John Bell; Beth Brickell; Jo Ellen Ford; Hayden McIlroy
- Editors: Beth Brickell; Erwin Dumbrille

Original release
- Network: PBS
- Release: 2005

Mr. Christmas is a 2004 American Christmas film directed by Beth Brickell. It was produced by Luminous Films and licensed to PBS, who first broadcast it in 2005 and for four consecutive years during the holiday season. The movie was filmed and set in Eureka Springs, Arkansas, a Victorian town in the Ozark Mountains.

The School Library Journal described the film as a "holiday classic."

== Plot ==
Set in 1941, the film centers around Joel Carter (Mclean), a print operator, who is unable to afford the bicycle his daughter Carol Lee (Maddox) has asked Santa Claus for as a Christmas gift. The film follows Carter's attempts to acquire a bicycle for Carol Lee. Due to the Great Depression and the onset of World War II, Carter does not receive a holiday bonus and is denied a bank loan as he lacks collateral; therefore Carter is unable to either afford or acquire a bicycle. On the night of Christmas Eve, Carter goes downtown and tries to convince a local shopkeeper to sell him the bicycle on a payment plan, but to no avail. On the walk home, Carter is dejected, but is followed home by a stray dog.

On Christmas morning, Carol Lee is saddened when she does not receive a bicycle for Christmas. However, her mood improves when she discovers a stray dog outside of the Carter family's door, who she names "Mr. Christmas". Initially, Joel's wife, Julia (Little), is tentative about keeping the dog, but eventually agrees much to the joy of the family.

== Cast ==
- Jace Mclean as Joel Carter
- Jen Celene Little as Julia Carter
- Ireland Rose Maddox as Carol Lee Carter
- Abigail Kinslow as Babby Carter
- Bill Sims as Bub
- Heather Allmendinger as Marie
- Wes Kemp as Paul
- Robert Clark as Santa Claus
- H.T. Jester as Mr. Smith
- Drew Osborn as Mr. Phillips
- David Atchison as Johnny
- Murray Atchison as Johnny's mother
- Yao Kouakou as Mailman

== Production ==
The movie was filmed in Eureka Springs, Arkansas in February and March 2004. The town of Eureka Springs left up all of the Christmas decorations during this period of filming.

Outside of Mclean and Little, all of the film's actors were residents of Arkansas.

== Critical reception ==
The Province's Rob Owen praised the old-fashioned wholesome nature of the film, writing that it "is a welcome addition to TV's holiday-special roster".

== Awards ==
Mr. Christmas won Best Family Film at the Moondance Film Festival and an Award of Excellence from the Film Advisory Board in Los Angeles.

== See also ==
- List of Christmas films
