= List of Rankin/Bass Productions films =

Rankin/Bass Productions was an American production company, best known for its animated seasonal television specials. Television series and films pre-1974 are owned by NBCUniversal through DreamWorks Animation, and those after September 1974 are owned by Warner Bros. Entertainment through Telepictures.

== Television specials ==
Title	Year	Directed by	Written by	Music	Animation Production	Style	Network	Ref
Return to Oz	1964	F.R. Crawley; Thomas Glynn; Larry Roemer	Romeo Muller	Gene Forrell; Edward Thomas; James Polack	Crawley Films	Traditional	NBC	
Rudolph the Red-Nosed Reindeer	1964	Larry Roemer	Romeo Muller	Johnny Marks	MOM Production	Stop-motion	NBC	
The Ballad of Smokey the Bear	1966	Larry Roemer	Joseph Schrank	Johnny Marks	MOM Production	Stop-motion	NBC	
The Cricket on the Hearth	1967	Arthur Rankin, Jr. Jules Bass	Romeo Muller; Arthur Rankin Jr.	Maury Laws	TCJ Animation Center	Traditional	NBC	
The Mouse on the Mayflower	1968	Arthur Rankin, Jr. Jules Bass	Romeo Muller	Maury Laws	Toei Animation	Traditional	NBC	
The Little Drummer Boy	1968	Arthur Rankin, Jr. Jules Bass	Romeo Muller	Colin Romoff	MOM Production	Stop-motion	NBC	
Frosty the Snowman	1969	Arthur Rankin, Jr. Jules Bass	Romeo Muller	Maury Laws; Jack Rollins; Steve Nelson	Mushi Production	Traditional	CBS	
The Mad, Mad, Mad Comedians	1970	Arthur Rankin, Jr. Jules Bass	Romeo Muller	Maury Laws	Mushi Production	Traditional	ABC	
Santa Claus Is Comin' to Town	1970	Arthur Rankin, Jr. Jules Bass	Romeo Muller	Jules Bass; Maury Laws	Video Tokyo Production	Stop-motion	ABC	
Here Comes Peter Cottontail	1971	Arthur Rankin, Jr. Jules Bass	Romeo Muller	Jack Rollins	Video Tokyo Production	Stop-motion	ABC	
Hans Christian Andersen's The Emperor's New Clothes	1972	Arthur Rankin, Jr. Jules Bass	Romeo Muller	Maury Laws	Video Tokyo Production	Stop-motion	ABC	
Mad Mad Mad Monsters (Note: Originally aired as part of The ABC Saturday Superstar Movie.)	1972	Arthur Rankin, Jr. Jules Bass	William J. Keenan; Lou Silverstone	Maury Laws	Mushi Production	Traditional	ABC	
Willie Mays and the Say-Hey Kid	1972	Arthur Rankin, Jr. Jules Bass	Romeo Muller	Maury Laws	Topcraft	Traditional	ABC	
The Red Baron	1972	Arthur Rankin, Jr. Jules Bass	Leonard Starr	Maury Laws	Topcraft	Traditional	ABC	
That Girl in Wonderland	1973	Arthur Rankin, Jr. Jules Bass	Stu Hample	Maury Laws	Topcraft	Traditional	ABC	
'Twas the Night Before Christmas	1974	Arthur Rankin, Jr. Jules Bass	Jerome Coopersmith	Maury Laws	Topcraft	Traditional	CBS	
The Year Without a Santa Claus	1974	Arthur Rankin, Jr. Jules Bass	William J. Keenan	Maury Laws	Video Tokyo Production	Stop-motion	ABC	
The First Christmas: The Story of the First Christmas Snow	1975	Arthur Rankin, Jr. Jules Bass	Julian P. Gardner	Maury Laws	Video Tokyo Production	Stop-motion	NBC	
The First Easter Rabbit	1976	Arthur Rankin, Jr. Jules Bass	Julian P. Gardner	Maury Laws	Topcraft	Traditional	NBC	
Frosty's Winter Wonderland	1976	Arthur Rankin, Jr. Jules Bass	Romeo Muller	Jack Rollins; Steve Nelson	Topcraft	Traditional	ABC	
Rudolph's Shiny New Year	1976	Arthur Rankin, Jr. Jules Bass	Romeo Muller	Johnny Marks	Video Tokyo Production	Stop-motion	ABC	
The Little Drummer Boy: Book II	1976	Arthur Rankin, Jr. Jules Bass	Julian P. Gardner	Maury Laws	Video Tokyo Production	Stop-motion	NBC	
The Easter Bunny Is Comin' to Town	1977	Arthur Rankin, Jr. Jules Bass	Romeo Muller	Maury Laws	Video Tokyo Production	Stop-motion	ABC	
The Hobbit (Note: The Hobbit (1977) is based on the 1937 novel of the name, written by J. R. R. Tolkien.)	1977	Arthur Rankin, Jr. Jules Bass	Romeo Muller	Maury Laws	Topcraft	Traditional	NBC	
Nestor, the Long-Eared Christmas Donkey	1977	Arthur Rankin, Jr. Jules Bass	Romeo Muller	Maury Laws	Video Tokyo Production	Stop-motion	ABC	
The Stingiest Man in Town	1978	Arthur Rankin, Jr. Jules Bass	Romeo Muller	Fred Spielman	Topcraft	Traditional	NBC	
Jack Frost	1979	Arthur Rankin, Jr. Jules Bass	Romeo Muller	Maury Laws	Video Tokyo Production	Stop-motion	NBC	
The Return of the King (Note: The Return of the King (1980) is based on the 1955 volume of The Lord of the Rings novel of the same name, written by J. R. R. Tolkien.)	1980	Arthur Rankin, Jr. Jules Bass	Romeo Muller	Maury Laws	Topcraft	Traditional	ABC	
Pinocchio's Christmas	1980	Arthur Rankin, Jr. Jules Bass	Romeo Muller	Maury Laws	Video Tokyo Production	Stop-motion	ABC	
The Leprechauns' Christmas Gold	1981	Arthur Rankin, Jr. Jules Bass	Romeo Muller	Maury Laws	Video Tokyo Production	Stop-motion	ABC	
The Flight of Dragons	1982	Arthur Rankin, Jr. Jules Bass	Romeo Muller	Maury Laws	Topcraft	Traditional	ABC	
The Coneheads (Note: The Coneheads (1983) is based on the Coneheads sketches from Saturday Night Live, first airing in 1977.)	1983	Arthur Rankin, Jr. Jules Bass	Al Franken; Tom Davis	Bernard Hoffer	Topcraft	Traditional	NBC	
The Life and Adventures of Santa Claus (Note: The Life and Adventures of Santa Claus (1985) is based on the 1902 children's story of the same name, written by L. Frank Baum.)	1985	Arthur Rankin, Jr. Jules Bass	Julian P. Gardner	Bernard Hoffer	Pacific Animation Corporation	Stop-motion	CBS	
The Wind in the Willows (Note: The Wind in the Willows (1987) is based on the 1908 children's story of the same name, written by Kenneth Grahame.)	1987	Arthur Rankin, Jr. Jules Bass	Romeo Muller	Maury Laws	Cuckoo's Nest	Traditional	ABC	
Santa, Baby!	2001	Lee Dannacher	Peter Bakalian; Suzanne Collins	Glen Roven	Pacific Animation Corporation; Hanho Heung-Up	Traditional	Fox	

== Feature films ==
Title	Year	Directed by	Written by	Music	Animation Production	Style	Distribution
Willy McBean and His Magic Machine	1965	Arthur Rankin Jr.	Arthur Rankin Jr.	Edward Thomas	MOM Production	Stop-motion	Magna Pictures Distribution Corporation
The Daydreamer	1966	Jules Bass	Arthur Rankin Jr.	Maury Laws	MOM Production	Stop-motion	Embassy Pictures
Mad Monster Party?	1967	Jules Bass	Len Korobkin; Harvey Kurtzman	Maury Laws	MOM Production	Stop-motion	Embassy Pictures
The Wacky World of Mother Goose	1967	Jules Bass	Romeo Muller	George Wilkins	TCJ Animation Center	Traditional	Embassy Pictures
Rudolph and Frosty's Christmas in July	1979	Arthur Rankin Jr. Jules Bass	Romeo Muller	Johnny Marks; Maury Laws	Video Tokyo Production	Stop-motion	Avco Embassy Pictures (limited); ABC (television)
The Last Unicorn	1982	Arthur Rankin Jr. Jules Bass	Peter S. Beagle	Jimmy Webb	Topcraft	Traditional	Jensen Farley Pictures
The King and I	1999	Richard Rich	Peter Bakalian; Jacqueline Feather; David Seidler	William Kidd	Rich Animation Studios	Traditional	Warner Bros. Pictures

== Animated TV series ==
With the exception of The New Adventures of Pinocchio (stop-motion), all of the TV shows were traditionally animated.

Title	Year	Animation Production	Network	No. of episodes
The New Adventures of Pinocchio	1961	MOM Production	Syndication	130
Tales of the Wizard of Oz	1961	Crawley Films	Syndication	110
The King Kong Show	1966	Toei Animation	ABC	26
The Smokey Bear Show	1969	Toei Animation	ABC	17
The Tomfoolery Show	1970	Halas and Batchelor	NBC	17
The Reluctant Dragon & Mr. Toad Show	1970	Mushi Production	ABC	17
Jackson 5ive	1971	Halas and Batchelor; Pegbar Production	ABC	23
The Osmonds	1972	Halas and Batchelor	ABC	17
Kid Power	1972	Topcraft	ABC	17
Festival of Family Classics	1972	Mushi Production (17 episodes); Topcraft (3 episodes)	Syndication	20
ThunderCats	1985	Pacific Animation Corporation	Syndication	130
SilverHawks	1986	Pacific Animation Corporation	Syndication	65
The Comic Strip: TigerSharks; Street Frogs; The Mini-Monsters; Karate Kat	1987	Pacific Animation Corporation	Syndication	65

== Live-action productions ==
Title	Year	Directed by	Written by	Music	Distribution
King Kong Escapes	1967	Ishirō Honda	Takeshi Kimura	Akira Ifukube	Universal Pictures (theatrical)
Marco	1973	Seymour Robbie	Romeo Muller	Maury Laws	Cinerama Releasing Corporation (theatrical)
The Last Dinosaur	1977	Alexander Grasshoff; Shusei Kotani	William Overgard	Maury Laws	ABC (television)
The Bermuda Depths	1978	Tom Kotani	William Overgard	Maury Laws	ABC (television)
The Ivory Ape	1980	Tom Kotani	William Overgard	Bernard Hoffer; Maury Laws	ABC (television)
The Bushido Blade	1981	Tom Kotani	William Overgard	Maury Laws	Aquarius Releasing (theatrical)
The Sins of Dorian Gray	1983	Tony Maylam	Ken August; Peter Lawrence	Bernard Hoffer	ABC (television)
