= Frosty the Snowman (TV special) =

1969 Christmas television special

- Title card
- Genre: Christmas
- Based on: "Frosty the Snowman" by Steve Nelson and Jack Rollins
- Written by: Romeo Muller
- Directed by: Arthur Rankin Jr. Jules Bass
- Voices of: Billy De Wolfe; Jackie Vernon; Paul Frees; June Foray
- Narrated by: Jimmy Durante
- Countries of origin: United States; Japan
- Original language: English

Production
- Producers: Arthur Rankin Jr. Jules Bass
- Editor: Irwin Goldress
- Running time: 25 minutes
- Production companies: Rankin/Bass Productions; Animation: Mushi Production

Original release
- Network: CBS
- Release: December 7, 1969

Related
- Rudolph the Red-Nosed Reindeer (1964) (Note: Recurring characters include Rudolph (voiced by Billie Mae Richards), Santa Claus (voiced by Stan Francis), and Mrs. Claus (voiced by Peg Dixon) in this special. Various actors portray the other reindeer.); Frosty the Snowman (1969) (Note: Recurring characters include Frosty the Snowman (voiced by Jackie Vernon), Santa (voiced by Paul Frees), and Professor Hinkle Tinkerton (voiced by Billy De Wolfe) in this special. Santa's reindeer also feature.); Santa Claus is Comin' to Town (1970) (Note: Recurring characters include Santa (voiced by Mickey Rooney), Mrs. Jessica Claus (voiced by Robie Lester), and S.D. Kluger (voiced by Fred Astaire) in this special. Rudolph and Santa's other reindeer also feature.); Here Comes Peter Cottontail (1971) (Note: Recurring characters include the Easter Bunny (voiced by Casey Kasem), and Santa (voiced by Frees) in this special. Santa's reindeer also feature.); 'Twas the Night Before Christmas (1974) (Note: Recurring characters in this special include Santa (voiced by Allen Swift), alongside his featured reindeer.); The Year Without a Santa Claus (1974) (Note: Recurring characters include Santa (voiced by Rooney), Mrs. Claus (voiced by Shirley Booth), Snow Miser (voiced by Dick Shawn), Heat Miser (voiced by George S. Irving), and Mother Nature (voiced by Rhoda Mann) in this special. Rudolph and Santa's other reindeer also feature.); The First Easter Rabbit (1976) (Note: Recurring characters include Easter Bunny (voiced by Robert Morse and Burl Ives), and Santa (voiced by Frees) in this special. Santa's reindeer also feature.); Frosty's Winter Wonderland (1976) (Note: Recurring characters include Frosty (voiced by Vernon), Mrs. Crystal Frosty (voiced by Shelley Winters), and Jack Frost (voiced by Frees) in this special.); Rudolph's Shiny New Year (1976) (Note: Recurring characters include Rudolph (voiced by Richards) and Santa (voiced by Frees) in this special. Santa's other reindeer also feature.); The Easter Bunny is Comin' to Town (1977) (Note: Recurring characters include Easter Bunny (voiced by Skip Hinnant), and S.D. Kluger (voiced by Astaire) in this special.); Nestor, the Long-Eared Christmas Donkey (1977) (Note: Recurring characters in this special include Santa (voiced by Frees), alongside Rudolph and his other featured reindeer.); The Stingiest Man in Town (1978) (Note: Recurring characters in this special include Santa Claus during a scene which compares the Ghost of Christmas Present to him (both characters were voiced by Frees).); Jack Frost (1979) (Note: The recurring character is Jack Frost (voiced by Robert Morse) in this special.); Rudolph and Frosty's Christmas in July (1979) (Note: Recurring characters include Rudolph (voiced by Richards), Frosty (voiced by Vernon), Santa (voiced by Rooney), Mrs. Claus (voiced by Darlene Conley), Crystal (voiced by Winters), and Jack Frost (voiced by Frees) in this special. Santa's other reindeer also feature.); Pinocchio's Christmas (1980) (Note: The recurring characters in the special include Santa (voiced by Swift), alongside his featured reindeer.); Frosty Returns (1992) (Note: The recurring character is Frosty (voiced by John Goodman) in this special. Mother Nature is also referenced in the short.); Rudolph the Red-Nosed Reindeer and the Island of Misfit Toys (2001) (Note: Recurring characters include Rudolph (voiced by Kathleen Barr), Santa (voiced by Garry Chalk), and Mrs. Claus (also voiced by Barr) in this film. Santa's other reindeer, and various other characters from the 1964 original also feature.); The Legend of Frosty the Snowman (2005) (Note: Recurring characters include Frosty (voiced by Bill Fagerbakke), and Professor Tinkerton (voiced by Kath Soucie) in this special.); A Miser Brothers' Christmas (2008) (Note: Recurring characters include Snow Miser (voiced by Juan Chioran), Heat Miser (voiced by Irving), Santa (voiced by Rooney), Mrs. Claus (voiced by Catherine Disher), and Mother Earth (voiced by Patricia Hamilton) in this special. Santa's reindeer also feature.)

Frosty the Snowman is a 1969 American animated Christmas television special produced by Rankin/Bass Productions. It is the first television special featuring the character Frosty the Snowman. The special first aired on December 7, 1969, on the CBS television network in the United States, airing immediately after the fifth showing of A Charlie Brown Christmas, both scoring high ratings. The special aired annually for the network's Christmas and holiday season until 2023. After 55 years, NBC acquired the broadcast rights to the special, and continues to air it yearly.

The special was based on the Walter E. Rollins and Steve Nelson song of the same name. It featured the voices of comedians Jimmy Durante (in his final film role) as the film's narrator, Billy De Wolfe as Professor Hinkle, and Jackie Vernon as Frosty. June Foray voiced Karen, the teacher, and some of the other children. Beginning with the fourth reairing on December 10, 1973, the voices of Karen and some of the children were re-recorded by child actors, with Karen voiced by Suzanne Davidson, although the end credits were never changed.

Arthur Rankin Jr. and Jules Bass wanted to give the show and its characters the look of a Christmas card, so Paul Coker Jr., a greeting card and Mad magazine artist, was hired to do the character and background drawings. The animation was produced by Mushi Production in Tokyo, Japan, with Yusaku "Steve" Nakagawa and then-Mushi staffer Osamu Dezaki (who is uncredited) among the animation staff. Durante was one of the first people to record the song when it was released in 1950 (though at the time the song had slightly different lyrics), and re-recorded the song for the special.

Rankin/Bass veteran writer Romeo Muller adapted and expanded the story for television, as he had done with the "Animagic" stop-motion production of Rudolph the Red-Nosed Reindeer. TV Guide ranked the special number 9 on its 10 Best Family Holiday Specials list.

== Plot ==
On Christmas Eve, inept magician Professor Hinkle is hired to perform at a school's party, but when it goes wrong, he blames his hat and throws it away. Once school is dismissed and the children go outside to play in the snow, they build a snowman that they name "Frosty.” The hat lands on the snowman’s head and brings him to life. Hinkle realizes that the hat is actually magic and sees this as a chance to become rich. He takes it back, despite the children’s protests, until his rabbit, Hocus Pocus, switches it with a lamppost wreath and brings the hat back to the children, who use it to revive Frosty.

However, the temperature begins to rise and Frosty fears that he will melt unless he can get to the North Pole. The children suggest putting him on a train to get there. They parade through town on the way to the train station, shocking several people including a traffic cop. Despite having no money for tickets, Frosty, Hocus, and one of the children named Karen secretly board a freight train's refrigerator car. Unbeknownst to them, Hinkle follows.

As the train continues northward, Karen develops hypothermia and Frosty realizes that she cannot withstand the extremely cold temperatures. When the train stops to let a passenger train pass, the trio disembarks in search of somewhere to warm Karen, with nobody knowing that Hinkle is following. By nightfall, Frosty and Hocus struggle to bring Karen through the forest, so Hocus asks a herd of forest animals to build a campfire for Karen, which they do. Fearing that the fire will not be good enough, Frosty decides to look for Santa Claus, whom he assumes can save Karen and bring him to the North Pole. While Hocus searches for Santa, Professor Hinkle arrives and puts out Karen's fire. Karen and Frosty flee and arrive at a greenhouse, with Frosty bringing Karen inside to warm her up. Hinkle arrives and shuts them inside, wanting Frosty to melt.

By the time Hocus and Santa arrive at the greenhouse, Frosty has already melted. Santa comforts a heartbroken Karen, explaining that Frosty is made of magical Christmas snow and will return every winter. He then opens the door, and the winter wind blows in magic snow to remake Frosty into a snowman. As they are about to put the hat on his head, Hinkle demands the hat, but Santa tells him he will never get another present if he does, then tells him to write his apologies, which Hinkle obliges to, hoping he’ll get a new hat, Santa revives Frosty, drops Karen off at her house, and then takes Frosty to the North Pole, promising that he will return every year with the magical Christmas snow.

As the end credits roll, Frosty leads a parade with the children, Hocus, Jimmy Durante, the traffic cop, and the rest of the town, including a redeemed Hinkle with his new hat. As the parade ends, Frosty boards Santa's sleigh and they fly off to the North Pole with Frosty altering the song's last line, saying, “I'll be back on Christmas Day!”

== Voice cast ==
- Jimmy Durante as himself (The narrator)
- Jackie Vernon as Frosty the Snowman
- Billy De Wolfe as Professor Hinkle
- June Foray as Karen (first airing), the children (first airing), and the school teacher
- Paul Frees as the children (first airing), The traffic cop, The ticket master, Hocus Pocus, and Santa Claus
- Suzanne Davidson as Karen (later airings)
- Greg Thomas and Jeff Thomas as the children (later airings)

== Production credits ==
- Producers/Directors: Arthur Rankin, Jr., Jules Bass
- Writer: Romeo Muller
- Based on "Frosty the Snowman" by Steve Nelson and Jack Rollins
- Character Designer: Paul Coker, Jr.
- Continuity Designer: Don Duga
- Sound Effects Engineers: Jim Harris and Phil Kaye
- Editorial Supervisor: Irwin Goldress
- Animation: Mushi Studios
  - Animation Supervisor: Steve Nakagawa
  - Animation Director: Osamu Dezaki (uncredited)
- Musical Director: Maury Laws

== Soundtrack ==
CD cover

Released by Rhino on October 1, 2002, the entire audio portion of Frosty the Snowman is available on CD along with the entire audio portion of Santa Claus is Comin' to Town, the Rankin/Bass special produced in 1970. This edition contains the full dialogue and song audio of both specials. It is notable for including the original recordings for Karen and the schoolchildren by June Foray.

The track listing is as follows:

1. Medley: Santa Claus Is Comin' To Town...Be Prepared To Pay 25:18
2. Medley: Put One Foot In Front Of The Other...Santa Claus Is Comin' To Town (finale) 24:55
3. Frosty The Snowman Theme & Narration (Beginning) 13:45
4. Frosty The Snowman Theme & Narration (Conclusion) 11:48
5. Santa Claus Is Comin' To Town (Soundtrack Version) 1:50
6. Frosty The Snowman (Soundtrack Version) 1:04

== Release ==
The special debuted on December 7, 1969, on CBS. It was ranked as the No. 1 television program for the week of December 1–7, 1969, by Nielsen Media Research, earning a 30.5 rating and a 45 share. It remained on CBS for the next 55 years until NBCUniversal, which owned the program along with the rest of the pre-1974 Videocraft (Rankin/Bass) catalog, brought the special (along with Rudolph the Red-Nosed Reindeer) onto its own network, NBC, for 2024 onwards.

=== Home video ===
Family Home Entertainment released Frosty the Snowman on VHS as part of the Christmas Classics Series in 1989 and 1993, with multiple re-prints throughout the 1990s. It was paired with The Little Drummer Boy on LaserDisc in 1992. Upon its 1989 and 1993 releases, the special was also bundled in box sets with the other Rankin/Bass Christmas specials including Rudolph the Red-Nosed Reindeer and Santa Claus is Comin' to Town, the 1973 Chuck Jones holiday special, A Very Merry Cricket and the sequel Frosty Returns which aired on CBS in 1992. In 1998, Sony Wonder and Golden Books Family Entertainment released the special on VHS, and also paired it with these other Rankin/Bass Christmas specials including Cricket on the Hearth in the separate Holiday Classics Collection box sets.

The special was also released on DVD by Sony Wonder and Golden Books Family Entertainment in 2001 and Classic Media in 2002 and 2004, and by Genius Entertainment in 2007. Vivendi Entertainment re-released it on DVD and for the first time on Blu-ray on October 12, 2010, and on the DVD/Blu-ray combo pack on November 6, 2012. Most DVD releases also include Frosty Returns. On September 8, 2015, Classic Media re-released both the special and Santa Claus is Comin' to Town in their 45th Anniversary Collector's Edition on Blu-ray and DVD in addition to the 50th Anniversary release of Rudolph the Red-Nosed Reindeer in 2014. Universal Pictures Home Entertainment released a Deluxe Edition of the special, along with other specials on Blu-ray and DVD, on October 16, 2018. In 2022, Universal released the special in 4K Ultra HD as part of The Classic Christmas Specials Collection (with Rudolph the Red-Nosed Reindeer and Santa Claus Is Comin' to Town).

=== Streaming ===
DreamWorks Animation made the special available for free through its YouTube channel Mini Moments from 2017 to 2023.

CBS's rights to the program did not include streaming rights, forcing the network to black out the special on all streaming platforms, including Paramount+ and feeds provided to cable and satellite alternatives such as YouTube TV and Hulu + Live TV.

== Reception ==
The special received positive reviews, albeit more modest than most of its contemporary specials. Clarke Williamson's 1970 survey of Christmas specials aired that year ranked Frosty as having a "fair" reception, which other than a 1960s compilation of The Ed Sullivan Show performances was the lowest ranking of any special on the survey. On review aggregator website Rotten Tomatoes, the special received an approval rating of 73% based on 15 reviews, with an average rating of 5.9/10. The site's critical consensus reads: "Frosty the Snowman is a jolly, happy sing-along that will delight children with its crisp animation and affable title character, who makes an indelible impression with his corncob pipe, button nose, and eyes made out of coal."

== Sequels ==
Frosty returned in several sequels:

- Frosty's Winter Wonderland – This 1976 standalone sequel by Rankin/Bass was also written by Romeo Muller. Narration is provided by Andy Griffith (Jimmy Durante retired after a stroke in 1972) and Jackie Vernon reprised the role of Frosty. The animation was produced by Topcraft in Japan. Unlike the original, the sequel takes place later in the winter season and is based upon the 1934 song "Winter Wonderland." The plot follows Frosty's pursuit of a wife and the town's efforts to preserve him into the springtime. Jack Frost is introduced as the new antagonist, and no characters besides Frosty and the traffic cop return from the original. As the special takes place in the late winter, it makes no mention of Christmas (the original song likewise did not mention Christmas).
- Rudolph and Frosty's Christmas in July – This 1979 Rankin/Bass feature-length sequel was filmed in the "Animagic" stop-motion style of Rudolph the Red-Nosed Reindeer. While the Frosty special is 30 minutes long, and the Rudolph special runs 60 minutes, this film is feature-length, at 97 minutes long (120 minutes on television, including commercials). Jackie Vernon returned as the voice of Frosty for the final time. Jack Frost also makes a brief return from Frosty's Winter Wonderland. Although set during the Fourth of July, this sequel is the only one to mention Christmas, and Santa Claus plays a major role. This is also the only Frosty special not to feature a narrator.
- Frosty Returns – This 1992 half-hour special is not truly a sequel to the original since it was produced not by Rankin/Bass but by CBS from December 1, 1992 until December 16, 2023. The characters, setting, voices and animation (by Bill Melendez) have all changed. Frosty's physical appearance, personality, and humor are markedly different, and he has the ability to live without his top hat, in direct contrast with the Rankin/Bass specials. Despite this, it was included as a bonus on previous DVD releases and was paired with the original on all of CBS's television airings. John Goodman provides the voice of Frosty in this special, and Jonathan Winters serves as narrator. The special avoids all mention of Christmas and has an environmentalist theme, as Frosty works to stop a corporate executive whose spray product wipes out snow.
- The Legend of Frosty the Snowman – This 2005 straight-to-video film was produced by Classic Media, the previous rights holder for the original Rankin/Bass special, and the remainder of their pre-1974 library. This movie has been bundled with the original 1969 Rankin/Bass special and the CBS sequel and aired on Cartoon Network. The story features almost entirely new characters and there are some inconsistencies in continuity, though Frosty's appearance closely resembles the Rankin/Bass character design. Professor Hinkle also appears in a flashback cameo role, and is later revealed to be the grandfather of main protagonist Tommy Tinkerton (voiced by Kath Soucie), who as an adult is the narrator (voiced by Burt Reynolds). Frosty is voiced by Bill Fagerbakke, best known as the voice of Patrick Star on SpongeBob SquarePants (Tom Kenny, the voice of SpongeBob himself, voices Tommy's father and town mayor Mr. Tinkerton).

== See also ==
- List of Christmas films
- List of Rankin/Bass Productions films
