= Santa Claus Is Comin' to Town (TV special) =

1970 Christmas TV special

- Title card
- Genre: Christmas
- Written by: Romeo Muller
- Directed by: Arthur Rankin Jr.; Jules Bass
- Voices of: Fred Astaire; Mickey Rooney; Keenan Wynn; Paul Frees; Joan Gardner; Robie Lester
- Narrated by: Fred Astaire
- Music by: Maury Laws; Jules Bass (lyrics)
- Countries of origin: United States; Japan
- Original language: English

Production
- Producers: Arthur Rankin Jr.; Jules Bass
- Cinematography: Kizo Nagashima
- Editor: Irwin Goldress
- Running time: 51 minutes
- Production company: Rankin/Bass Productions

Original release
- Network: ABC
- Release: December 13, 1970

Related
- Rudolph the Red-Nosed Reindeer (1964) (Note: Recurring characters include Rudolph (voiced by Billie Mae Richards), Santa Claus (voiced by Stan Francis), and Mrs. Claus (voiced by Peg Dixon) in this special. Various actors portray the other reindeer.); The Little Drummer Boy (1968) (Note: Recurring characters include Aaron (voiced by Teddy Eccles) and Our Storyteller (voiced by Greer Garson) in this special.); Frosty the Snowman (1969) (Note: Recurring characters include Frosty the Snowman (voiced by Jackie Vernon), Santa (voiced by Paul Frees), and Professor Hinkle Tinkerton (voiced by Billy De Wolfe) in this special. Santa's reindeer also feature.); Santa Claus Is Comin' to Town (1970) (Note: Recurring characters include Santa (voiced by Mickey Rooney), Mrs. Jessica Claus (voiced by Robie Lester), and S.D. Kluger (voiced by Fred Astaire) in this special. Rudolph and Santa's other reindeer also feature.); Here Comes Peter Cottontail (1971) (Note: Recurring characters include the Easter Bunny (voiced by Casey Kasem), and Santa (voiced by Frees) in this special. Santa's reindeer also feature.); 'Twas the Night Before Christmas (1974) (Note: Recurring characters in this special include Santa (voiced by Allen Swift), alongside his featured reindeer.); The Year Without a Santa Claus (1974) (Note: Recurring characters include Santa (voiced by Rooney), Mrs. Claus (voiced by Shirley Booth), Snow Miser (voiced by Dick Shawn), Heat Miser (voiced by George S. Irving), and Mother Nature (voiced by Rhoda Mann) in this special. Rudolph and Santa's other reindeer also feature.); The First Easter Rabbit (1976) (Note: Recurring characters include Easter Bunny (voiced by Robert Morse and Burl Ives), and Santa (voiced by Frees) in this special. Santa's reindeer also feature.); Frosty's Winter Wonderland (1976) (Note: Recurring characters include Frosty (voiced by Vernon), Mrs. Crystal Frosty (voiced by Shelley Winters), and Jack Frost (voiced by Frees) in this special.); Rudolph's Shiny New Year (1976) (Note: Recurring characters include Rudolph (voiced by Richards) and Santa (voiced by Frees) in this special. Santa's other reindeer also feature.); The Little Drummer Boy, Book II (1976) (Note: Recurring characters include Aaron (voiced by David Jay) and Our Storyteller (voiced by Greer Garson) in this special.); The Easter Bunny Is Comin' to Town (1977) (Note: Recurring characters include Easter Bunny (voiced by Skip Hinnant), and S.D. Kluger (voiced by Astaire) in this special.); Nestor, the Long-Eared Christmas Donkey (1977) (Note: Recurring characters in this special include Santa (voiced by Frees), alongside Rudolph and his other featured reindeer.); The Stingiest Man in Town (1978) (Note: Recurring characters in this special include Santa Claus during a scene which compares the Ghost of Christmas Present to him (both characters were voiced by Frees).); Jack Frost (1979) (Note: The recurring character is Jack Frost (voiced by Robert Morse) in this special.); Rudolph and Frosty's Christmas in July (1979) (Note: Recurring characters include Rudolph (voiced by Richards), Frosty (voiced by Vernon), Santa (voiced by Rooney), Mrs. Claus (voiced by Darlene Conley), Crystal (voiced by Winters), and Jack Frost (voiced by Frees) in this special. Santa's other reindeer also feature.); Pinocchio's Christmas (1980) (Note: The recurring characters in the special include Santa (voiced by Swift), alongside his featured reindeer.); Frosty Returns (1992) (Note: The recurring character is Frosty (voiced by John Goodman) in this special. Mother Nature is also referenced in the short.); Rudolph the Red-Nosed Reindeer and the Island of Misfit Toys (2001) (Note: Recurring characters include Rudolph (voiced by Kathleen Barr), Santa (voiced by Garry Chalk), and Mrs. Claus (also voiced by Barr) in this film. Santa's other reindeer, and various other characters from the 1964 original also feature.); The Legend of Frosty the Snowman (2005) (Note: Recurring characters include Frosty (voiced by Bill Fagerbakke), and Professor Tinkerton (voiced by Kath Soucie) in this special.); A Miser Brothers' Christmas (2008) (Note: Recurring characters include Snow Miser (voiced by Juan Chioran), Heat Miser (voiced by Irving), Santa (voiced by Rooney), Mrs. Claus (voiced by Catherine Disher), and Mother Earth (voiced by Patricia Hamilton) in this special. Santa's reindeer also feature.)

Santa Claus Is Comin' to Town is a 1970 American stop-motion Christmas television special produced by Rankin/Bass Productions in New York. The film is narrated by Fred Astaire and stars the voices of Mickey Rooney, Keenan Wynn, Robie Lester, Joan Gardner and Paul Frees, as well as an assistant song performance by the Westminster Children's Choir. The film tells the story of how Santa Claus and several Claus-related Christmas traditions came to be. It is based on the hit Christmas song "Santa Claus Is Comin' to Town", which was written by J. Fred Coots and Haven Gillespie for Leo Feist, Inc. and introduced on radio by Eddie Cantor in 1934, and the story of Saint Nicholas.

The special was created using Japanese stop-motion animation called "Animagic," in which all the characters are made of wood and plastic and animated via stop-motion photography. The special was originally telecast December 13, 1970, by ABC, which continues to air the special every year, along with its sister network Freeform (as of 2022, commemorating the special's 50th anniversary), although, at times, both networks have edited the special to make room for commercials.

== Plot ==
After a newsreel highlighting children preparing for the arrival of Santa Claus is shown, a postman named Special Delivery "S.D." Kluger is introduced. When Kluger's mail truck breaks down, he proceeds to tell the story of Santa in response to letters sent by children.

A baby named Claus arrives on the doorstep of Burgermeister Meisterburger, the grouchy mayor of Sombertown. Meisterburger orders Grimsley, his aide, to take Claus to the local orphanage, but a gust of wind sweeps the baby away. Claus is rescued by a group of animals who transport him to the Kringles, a family of elves. They rename him Kris and raise him, teaching him how to make toys, the Kringles' family occupation.

When Kris is old enough, he volunteers to travel to Sombertown and deliver the toys. On the way, he befriends a lost penguin whom he names Topper. Meanwhile, Meisterburger, having tripped over a toy duck, enacts a law prohibiting all toys. Kris then arrives in town and bestows toys on the local children, even giving one to Miss Jessica, their schoolteacher. Meisterburger orders Kris's arrest, prompting him to flee into the forest with Topper. They are soon captured by the Winter Warlock, but Kris senses that there is a nice man behind the Warlock's frightful appearance. Kris gives the Warlock a given a toy train, which causes his frozen heart to melt and changes his appearance to one less frightening.

To prevent further toy distribution, Meisterburger orders all doors and windows locked, but Kris enters by the chimneys and places toys in the children's stockings. Meisterburger sets a trap for Kris, while his soldiers capture Winter, Topper, and the Kringles. Jessica visits Winter in prison, where he reveals that he has lost all his magic except for some enchanted corn that enables some of Kris's reindeer friends to fly. With the help of the reindeer, Kris and his companions escape. Meisterburger swears that he and his descendants will never stop hunting them down until they are captured again.

Soon after, Kris, now sporting a beard as a disguise, returns to his "Claus" name and marries Jessica. They travel to the North Pole to establish a toy workshop. After Meisterburger dies, his laws are nullified, and Kris is canonized as a saint, becoming Santa Claus. Due to the rising demand for toys, Santa limits his gift-giving to Christmas Eve, the anniversary of his and Jessica's wedding.

After finishing the story, S.D. Kluger suddenly remembers that he has to deliver the letters to Santa and leaves for the North Pole with Topper, Winter, and a parade of children, singing the title song.

== Voice cast ==
An original advertisement for the special

- Fred Astaire as Special Delivery "S.D." Kluger
- Mickey Rooney as Kris Kringle/Santa Claus
- Keenan Wynn as Winter Warlock
- Robie Lester as Miss Jessica/Mrs. Claus
- Paul Frees as Burgermeister Meisterburger, Grimsley, Topper, animals (horse and seals), guards, doctor, Newsreel Announcer, Kringle Brothers (Dingle, Bingle, Tingle, Wingle, and Zingle) (speaking voices), male townspeople, businessman, Ebenezer Scrooge, tree monsters (Willy Willow and Peter Pine), and more
  - The Mike Sammes Singers as Kringle Brothers (Dingle, Bingle, Tingle, Wingle, and Zingle) (singing voices)
- Joan Gardner as Tanta Kringle, grouchy store lady, female townspeople, and more
- Dina Lynn, Greg Thomas, Gary White, and Andrea Sacino as the children (speaking voices)
  - Greg Thomas also voices Kris Kringle as a child and baby
  - The Westminster Children’s Choir as the children (singing voices).

== Soundtrack ==
CD cover

1. "The First Toymakers to the King" – Tanta and the Kringles featuring the Mike Sammes Singers
2. "No More Toymakers to the King" – Burgermeister Meisterburger and Grimsley
3. "Be Prepared to Pay" a.k.a. "If You Sit On My Lap Today" – Kris and the Westminster Children's Choir
4. "Put One Foot in Front of the Other" – Kris and Winter featuring The Mike Sammes Singers
5. "My World Is Beginning Today" – Jessica
6. "Wedding Song" a.k.a. "What Better Way to Tell You" – S. D. Kluger and The Mike Sammes Singers
7. "Santa Claus Is Comin' to Town" – S. D. Kluger and the Westminster Children's Choir

A vinyl version of the soundtrack was issued in 1970 to promote the special; copies were sent to radio disc jockeys.

A CD version was released by Rhino on October 1, 2002, the soundtrack for Santa Claus Is Comin' to Town is available on CD, along with that of Frosty the Snowman, the Rankin/Bass special produced the previous year. This edition contains the full dialogue and all songs for both specials.

The track listing is as follows:

1. Medley: Santa Claus Is Comin' To Town...Be Prepared To Pay 25:18
2. Medley: Put One Foot In Front Of The Other...Santa Claus Is Comin' To Town (finale) 24:55
3. Frosty The Snowman Theme & Narration (Beginning) 13:45
4. Frosty The Snowman Theme & Narration (Conclusion) 11:48
5. Santa Claus Is Comin' To Town (Soundtrack Version) 1:50
6. Frosty The Snowman (Soundtrack Version) 1:04

== Editing ==
The special has been edited for content and length by ABC, Viacom, and Freeform since its original airing. In 1986, ABC cut two songs from the special ("My World Is Beginning Today" and "What Better Way to Tell You"), as well as cutting two other songs in half.

When Viacom syndicated the special to local television stations in the 1980s and 1990s, only the songs (except "Put One Foot in Front of the Other") were shortened for time, while "What Better Way to Tell You" was removed entirely.

Freeform has cut several scenes deemed inappropriate for young audiences, such as Kris climbing and leaping to escape (which was cut to prevent children from trying to imitate the same stunt), Winter Warlock knowing Kris will return and telling him he will never escape, and the scene in which the Burgermeister torches the seized toys in front of the children of Sombertown.

In 2019, Freeform's print of the special included the 2012 Universal Pictures logo preceding the film, due to their 2016 purchase of DreamWorks Animation, the current owner of the pre-1974 Rankin/Bass library. In this version, the scenes that were originally cut were restored.

== Home media ==
Beginning in 1989, the special has been released numerous times on VHS and DVD. The 2005 DVD release included a CD single of Mariah Carey performing the title song. The special is also available as part of a DVD box set with other Rankin/Bass Christmas titles, including Rudolph the Red-Nosed Reindeer and Frosty the Snowman, and Bill Melendez's Frosty Returns. In 2010, the special was released in the same box set on Blu-ray. In 2015, both the special and Frosty the Snowman were released on Blu-ray-DVD combo packs in the 45th Anniversary Collector's Edition. In 2022, the special was released on 4K Ultra HD as part of The Classic Christmas Specials Collection (with Rudolph the Red-Nosed Reindeer and Frosty the Snowman).

== Reception ==
The film has an aggregated review score of 93% based on 14 reviews on Rotten Tomatoes, with a critic consensus stating: "Arriving with light-hearted cheeriness and the best musical numbers, Santa Claus Is Comin' To Town is a magical story told by charming wood-figure animation."

Emily Ashby of Common Sense Media gave the special five stars out of five, calling it a "winner for families."

== Novelization ==
Running Press published a novelization of the special in 2008, written by Sierra Harimann and featuring watercolor illustrations by Michael Koelsch. The novelization includes some additional details, although it is uncertain whether they originated from the author's imagination or were derived from the original script. The Dismal Forest is located at the base of the Mountain of the Whispering Winds. The young children Kris converses with by the fountain are named Annette and Andy. The Sombertown Dungeon is designed like a fortress, featuring a central courtyard where the reindeer arrive to rescue everyone.

== Video game ==
Santa Claus Is Comin' to Town!
- Developer: 1st Playable Productions
- Publisher: Red Wagon Games
- Platforms: Wii; Nintendo DS
- Release: NA: November 8, 2011
- Genre: Platform
- Modes: Single player, multiplayer

A video game based on the film was released November 8, 2011, for the Nintendo DS and Wii. The game was developed for the Wii by 1st Playable Productions and released on both platforms by budget publishers/label partners, with retail listings and database entries identifying Red Wagon Games as the distribution partner for some markets. Gameplay, targeted primarily at children and families, frames itself as an interactive adaptation of the original 1970 television special, allowing players to assume the role of Kris Kringle and complete various holiday-themed tasks where players progress through short, story-book style chapters retelling key moments from the special like delivering toys, helping the penguin companion Topper, and navigating simple motion/control challenges typical of the Wii and DS formats.

== See also ==
- List of Christmas films
- Santa Claus in film
- The Easter Bunny Is Comin' to Town
- List of Rankin/Bass Productions films
- Klaus, 2019 animated film with a similar plot
