= Rudolph the Red-Nosed Reindeer (TV special) =

1964 Christmas TV special

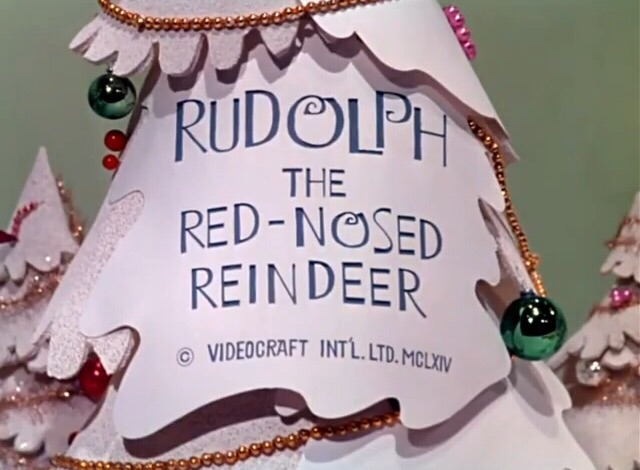
- Title card
- Genre: Christmas; Family; Comedy; Musical
- Based on: "Rudolph the Red-Nosed Reindeer" by Johnny Marks
- Written by: Romeo Muller
- Directed by: Larry Roemer
- Narrated by: Burl Ives
- Music by: Johnny Marks
- Countries of origin: United States; Canada; Japan; United Kingdom
- Original language: English

Production
- Producer: Arthur Rankin Jr.
- Cinematography: Tadahito Mochinaga
- Running time: 52 minutes
- Production company: Videocraft International
- Budget: $500,000

Original release
- Network: NBC
- Release: December 6, 1964

Related
- Rudolph the Red-Nosed Reindeer (1964) (Note: Recurring characters include Rudolph (voiced by Billie Mae Richards), Santa Claus (voiced by Stan Francis), and Mrs. Claus (voiced by Peg Dixon) in this special. Various actors portray the other reindeer.); Frosty the Snowman (1969) (Note: Recurring characters include Frosty the Snowman (voiced by Jackie Vernon), Santa (voiced by Paul Frees), and Professor Hinkle Tinkerton (voiced by Billy De Wolfe) in this special. Santa's reindeer also feature.); Santa Claus Is Comin' to Town (1970) (Note: Recurring characters include Santa (voiced by Mickey Rooney), Mrs. Jessica Claus (voiced by Robie Lester), and S.D. Kluger (voiced by Fred Astaire) in this special. Rudolph and Santa's other reindeer also feature.); Here Comes Peter Cottontail (1971) (Note: Recurring characters include the Easter Bunny (voiced by Casey Kasem), and Santa (voiced by Frees) in this special. Santa's reindeer also feature.); 'Twas the Night Before Christmas (1974) (Note: Recurring characters in this special include Santa (voiced by Allen Swift), alongside his featured reindeer.); The Year Without a Santa Claus (1974) (Note: Recurring characters include Santa (voiced by Rooney), Mrs. Claus (voiced by Shirley Booth), Snow Miser (voiced by Dick Shawn), Heat Miser (voiced by George S. Irving), and Mother Nature (voiced by Rhoda Mann) in this special. Rudolph and Santa's other reindeer also feature.); The First Easter Rabbit (1976) (Note: Recurring characters include Easter Bunny (voiced by Robert Morse and Burl Ives), and Santa (voiced by Frees) in this special. Santa's reindeer also feature.); Frosty's Winter Wonderland (1976) (Note: Recurring characters include Frosty (voiced by Vernon), Mrs. Crystal Frosty (voiced by Shelley Winters), and Jack Frost (voiced by Frees) in this special.); Rudolph's Shiny New Year (1976) (Note: Recurring characters include Rudolph (voiced by Richards) and Santa (voiced by Frees) in this special. Santa's other reindeer also feature.); The Easter Bunny Is Comin' to Town (1977) (Note: Recurring characters include Easter Bunny (voiced by Skip Hinnant), and S.D. Kluger (voiced by Astaire) in this special.); Nestor, the Long-Eared Christmas Donkey (1977) (Note: Recurring characters in this special include Santa (voiced by Frees), along with Rudolph and his other featured reindeer.); The Stingiest Man in Town (1978) (Note: Recurring characters in this special include Santa Claus during a scene which compares the Ghost of Christmas Present to him (both characters were voiced by Frees).); Jack Frost (1979) (Note: The recurring character is Jack Frost (voiced by Robert Morse) in this special.); Rudolph and Frosty's Christmas in July (1979) (Note: Recurring characters include Rudolph (voiced by Richards), Frosty (voiced by Vernon), Santa (voiced by Rooney), Mrs. Claus (voiced by Darlene Conley), Crystal (voiced by Winters), and Jack Frost (voiced by Frees) in this special. Santa's other reindeer also feature.); Pinocchio's Christmas (1980) (Note: The recurring characters in the special include Santa (voiced by Swift), alongside his featured reindeer.); Frosty Returns (1992) (Note: The recurring character is Frosty (voiced by John Goodman) in this special. Mother Nature is also referenced in the short.); Rudolph the Red-Nosed Reindeer and the Island of Misfit Toys (2001) (Note: Recurring characters include Rudolph (voiced by Kathleen Barr), Santa (voiced by Garry Chalk), and Mrs. Claus (also voiced by Barr) in this film. Santa's other reindeer, and various other characters from the 1964 original also feature.); The Legend of Frosty the Snowman (2005) (Note: Recurring characters include Frosty (voiced by Bill Fagerbakke), and Professor Tinkerton (voiced by Kath Soucie) in this special.); A Miser Brothers' Christmas (2008) (Note: Recurring characters include Snow Miser (voiced by Juan Chioran), Heat Miser (voiced by Irving), Santa (voiced by Rooney), Mrs. Claus (voiced by Catherine Disher), and Mother Earth (voiced by Patricia Hamilton) in this special. Santa's reindeer also feature.)

Rudolph the Red-Nosed Reindeer is a 1964 stop motion Christmas animated television special produced by Videocraft International, Ltd. (later named Rankin/Bass). It first aired December 6, 1964, on the NBC television network in the United States and was sponsored by General Electric under the umbrella title of The General Electric Fantasy Hour. The special was based on the 1949 Johnny Marks song "Rudolph, the Red-Nosed Reindeer" which was itself based on the poem of the same name written in 1939 by Marks's brother-in-law, Robert L. May. The concept was developed in New York City, the animation was done in Japan, the music was recorded in England, and most of the voice actors were from Canada. The production was completed in 18 months.

NBC began airing the special annually again in 2024, having previously done so from 1964 to 1971. From 1972 to 2023, the special aired on CBS, which unveiled a high-definition, digitally remastered version of the program in 2005, re-scanned frame-by-frame from the original 35 mm film elements. As with A Charlie Brown Christmas and How the Grinch Stole Christmas!, Rudolph the Red-Nosed Reindeer no longer airs merely once annually, but several times during the Christmas and holiday season. It has been telecast every year since 1964, making it the longest continuously running Christmas TV special in the United States. The 50th anniversary of the television special was marked in 2014, and a series of postage stamps featuring Rudolph was issued by the United States Postal Service on November 6, 2014. A special exhibit was also mounted at the Masterworks Museum in Bermuda, where the original puppets are held. Since 2019, Freeform has aired the special as a part of its 25 Days of Christmas holiday programming block.

Rudolph the Red-Nosed Reindeer was initially met with a positive reception among critics, who praised the voice acting, soundtrack, animation style, characters, and sets. Rudolph the Red-Nosed Reindeer is often regarded as one of the best Christmas films ever made, being featured on numerous "top ten" lists. It has become widely popular among both young children and adults.

== Plot ==
Donner, Santa Claus’ lead reindeer and his wife are surprised to find out their new fawn, Rudolph, has a glowing red nose. Donner attempts to first cover Rudolph's nose with mud and later uses a prosthetic nose so Rudolph will fit in with the other reindeer.

The following spring, Rudolph goes to the reindeer games where the new fawns learn to fly and are scouted by Santa for future sleigh duty. Rudolph meets a doe named Clarice, who tells him he is cute, making Rudolph fly. While celebrating with the other bucks, Rudolph's prosthetic pops off, causing the other reindeer to mock him and Coach Comet to expel him.

Rudolph meets and joins Hermey, a misfit elf who left Santa's workshop to follow his dream to become a dentist, and Yukon Cornelius, a prospector who has been searching for silver and gold throughout his life. After escaping the Abominable Snow Monster, the trio land on the Island of Misfit Toys. It is a place where unloved or unwanted toys reside with their ruler, a winged lion named King Moonracer who brings the toys to the island until he can find homes and children who would love them. The king allows them to stay the night on the island and asks them for Santa's help in finding homes for the toys. Rudolph leaves on his own that night, worried that his nose will endanger his friends.

Time passes and Rudolph, now a young buck, returns home to find that his parents and Clarice have been searching for him. He travels to the monster’s cave, where they are being held captive. Rudolph attempts to rescue Clarice until the monster knocks him out with a stalactite. Hermey and Yukon arrive, intent on rescuing Rudolph. Hermey lures the monster out of the cave and pulls out the Abominable's teeth after Yukon uses a falling boulder to knock him out. Yukon then drives the toothless monster back, over a cliffside but falls in with it.

After Rudolph, Hermey, Clarice, and the Donners return home, everyone apologizes to Rudolph and Hermey for their behavior. To everyone's surprise, Yukon returns with a tamed Abominable, now trained to trim a Christmas tree, explaining that the monster's bouncing ability saved their lives. As everybody celebrates on Christmas Eve, Santa announces that a major snowstorm will force him to cancel Christmas, but he reconsiders after noticing Rudolph's bright red nose. Rudolph leads the sleigh, with their first stop being the Island of Misfit Toys, so that Santa can deliver them to the children.

== Cast ==
- Burl Ives as Sam the Snowman
- Larry Mann as Yukon Cornelius
- Billie Mae Richards as Rudolph
- Paul Soles as Hermey the Elf (Note: Books and other items related to the show have in some cases misspelled "Hermey" as "Herbie". According to Rudolph the Red-Nosed Reindeer: The Making of the Rankin/Bass Holiday Classic, the scripts by Romeo Muller show the spelling to be "Hermey".)
- Stan Francis as:
  - Santa Claus
  - King Moonracer
- Alfie Scopp as:
  - Fireball
  - Charlie-in-the-Box
  - Various male elves (speaking voices)
  - Various male reindeer
- Janis Orenstein as Clarice
- Paul Kligman as:
  - Mr. Donner
  - Coach Comet
- Carl Banas as:
  - The Head Elf
  - Various Misfit Toys (speaking voices)
- Corinne Conley as:
  - Mrs. Donner
  - Dolly for Sue
  - Various female elves (speaking voices)
  - Various female reindeer
- Peg Dixon as:
  - Mrs. Claus
  - Various female elves (speaking voices)
  - Various female reindeer
- Bernard Cowan as:
  - Bumble the Abominable Snow Monster of the North (uncredited)
  - The Spotted Elephant (uncredited)
  - Clarice's father (uncredited)
- Murray Spivack as Bumble the Abominable Snow Monster of the North (archive recordings from King Kong) (uncredited)
- Videocraft Chorus as:
  - Various male elves (singing voices in We Are Santa's Elves and A Holly Jolly Christmas) (uncredited)
  - Various female elves (singing voices in We Are Santa's Elves and A Holly Jolly Christmas) (uncredited)
  - Singing Animals (There's Always Tomorrow) (uncredited)
  - Various Misfit Toys (singing voices in The Most Wonderful Day of the Year) (uncredited)

== Production ==
=== Development ===
The special, with the teleplay by Romeo Muller, introduced several new characters inspired by the song's lyrics. Muller told an interviewer shortly before his death that he would have preferred to base the teleplay on May's original book, but could not find a copy. After the script, concept designs and storyboards for Rudolph were done by Arthur Rankin Jr. and his staff of artists at Rankin/Bass in New York City.

=== Voice cast ===
Most of the characters were portrayed by Canadian actors recorded at RCA Studios at 225 Mutual Street in Toronto under the supervision of Bernard Cowan. The recording sessions lasted for two days, which was followed by a session in New York City to polish the songs. Rankin and Bass chose Canadian voice actors for two reasons. First, while the last radio dramas in the United States had ended production a few years previously, many were still being produced in Canada, giving the producers a large talent pool to choose from. CBC was large enough to enable American workers, such as Rankin and Bass, to get their shows done in Toronto. Second, Rankin and Bass were taking loans from friends to bankroll and chose Toronto's Crawley Films to financially stretch out 130 short episodes of Tales of the Wizard of Oz, which made the Canadian labor costs cheaper. Billie Mae Richards, who provided the voice of Rudolph, reprised the role for Rudolph's Shiny New Year and Rudolph and Frosty's Christmas in July.

Sam the Snowman was originally voiced by Larry D. Mann, but it was later decided that Burl Ives would voice him. Ives was hired to appease NBC and its sponsor General Electric. This was Rankin/Bass's marketing strategy to employ a bigger celebrity, which would later happen in other specials, such as Jimmy Durante in Frosty the Snowman and Fred Astaire in Santa Claus Is Comin' to Town. In the original production, Billie Mae Richards, who voiced Rudolph, was credited under the name of her husband, Billy Richards, since Rankin and Bass did not want to disclose that a woman had done the part.

=== Designs and animation ===
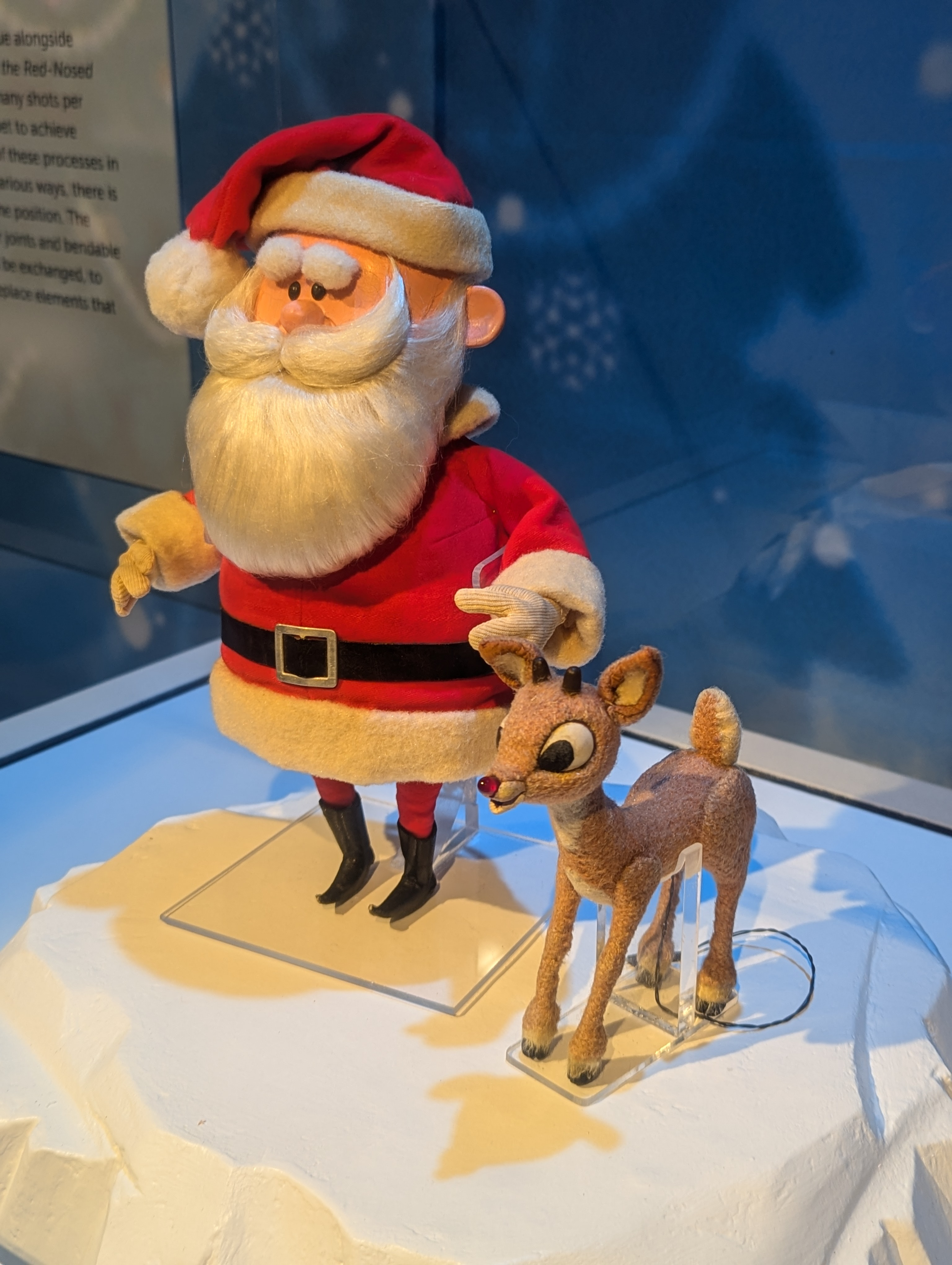
Puppets from the film on display at the Center for Puppetry Arts.

The figures were designed by continuity designer Antony Peters in the United States. Peters' name is also misspelled in all prints of the special since 1965. The company's trademark stop motion animation process, known as "Animagic", was filmed at MOM Productions in Tokyo with supervision by Tadahito Mochinaga and associate direction by Kizo Nagashima. Besides Rudolph, Mochinaga and the rest of the Japanese puppet animation staff are also known for their partnership with Rankin/Bass on their other Animagic productions almost throughout the 1960s, from The New Adventures of Pinocchio, to Willy McBean and his Magic Machine, to The Daydreamer and Mad Monster Party?

Each "Animagic" figure cost $5,000 to make, including Rudolph and Santa.

=== Music ===
The songs were written by Johnny Marks, with musical director Maury Laws composing the incidental score. In addition to songs written specifically for the film, several of Marks' other holiday standards populate the instrumental score, among them "Rockin' Around the Christmas Tree" and "I Heard the Bells on Christmas Day". Many of the songs are utilized in the score as musical themes for recurring characters and ideas, such as "Silver and Gold" (for Yukon Cornelius, sung by Burl Ives), "Jingle, Jingle, Jingle" (Santa, sung by Stan Francis) and "There's Always Tomorrow" (Clarice, sung by Janis Orenstein). The music score was recorded in England. In 1965, an executive of the special's sponsor General Electric decided that "We're a Couple of Misfits" would be replaced by "Fame and Fortune". "We're a Couple of Misfits" was added back in 1998.

Ives re-recorded "A Holly Jolly Christmas", with different arrangements, for the song's 1964 single release. This version, along with a similarly newly recorded version of "Rudolph the Red-Nosed Reindeer", was released the following year on his 1965 album Have a Holly Jolly Christmas.

== Broadcast ==
Original release advertisement

=== Marketing ===
Rankin and Bass signed a deal with General Electric to cover the special's cost of $500,000. The contract only lasted for two broadcasts. To promote the special, a set of puppets was shipped from Japan to the United States and displayed at NBC Studios in Manhattan, New York City during the Christmas season.

=== Release and reruns ===
Rudolph the Red-Nosed Reindeer premiered on December 6, 1964, as part of The General Electric Fantasy Hour on NBC, at 5:30pm (EST). In 1972, the special would start airing on CBS.

In May 2019, it was announced that Freeform would air the special as part of their annual 25 Days of Christmas lineup for the first time, alongside Frosty the Snowman. The agreement was an exclusive rights agreement, as CBS continued to broadcast the special over-the-air each November and December until 2023, but not on Paramount+ nor, in an unusual case of blackout, virtual multichannel video program distributors such as YouTube TV and Hulu + Live TV, which have traditionally carried all network programming in the same fashion as cable and satellite providers; CBS parent company Paramount claimed, copyright ambiguity notwithstanding, that it did not have streaming rights to the special.

NBC broadcast the special again for the first time in 52 years on December 6, 2024, in a 75-minute telecast. This change also marked the first time that the special can be streamed on YouTube TV, Hulu and other live TV streaming services.

== Home media ==
Rudolph the Red-Nosed Reindeer was first released on VHS and LaserDisc by Family Home Entertainment and Broadway Video from 1989 to 1996 under the Christmas Classics Series label. It was re-released in 1997 by Family Home Entertainment and Golden Books Family Entertainment.

In 1998, the special was re-released on VHS by Sony Wonder and Golden Books Family Entertainment. In 1999, the special was released for the first time on DVD by the two companies. In 2010, the special was released for the first time on Blu-ray by Vivendi Entertainment. On November 4, 2014, they re-released the special on a 50th anniversary edition on Blu-ray and DVD. The same 50th anniversary Blu-ray edition was released with an exclusive storybook; this was only sold at Walmart. Universal Pictures Home Entertainment re-released the special again on DVD and Blu-ray in 2018. Universal re-released the special on 4K UHD Blu-ray as part of The Classic Christmas Specials Collection (with Frosty the Snowman and Santa Claus Is Comin' to Town) in 2022.

== Reception ==
=== Critical response ===
Upon its initial broadcast, Rudolph the Red-Nosed Reindeer received acclaim from critics. A television review of The New York Times called the special "a charming and tuneful hour of fantasy", stating that the animation "radiated a gentle spirit of make-believe" and praising the songs as "an ideal complement to the story of Robert L. May." A review on San Antonio Light's TV Week praised the special as a "delightful hour for children", describing it as "cleverly conceived". Cynthia Lowry of The New York Times stated that the story was "full of delightful adult wit and a bit of satire."

Rudolph the Red-Nosed Reindeer received an approval rating of 95% on review aggregator website Rotten Tomatoes, based on thirteen reviews, with an average rating of 9.37/10. The site's critical consensus reads: "Rudolph the Red-Nosed Reindeer is a yule-tide gem that bursts with eye-popping iconography, a spirited soundtrack, and a heart-warming celebration of difference." Contemporary reports rated the special highly, with a 1970 survey from Clarke Williamson noting that viewers gave the special above-average reviews, only slightly lower than two other 1960s classics, A Charlie Brown Christmas and The Little Drummer Boy, and ahead of other specials of the era. In December 2018, a Hollywood Reporter/Morning Consult poll which surveyed 2,200 adults from Nov. 15–18, 2018, named Rudolph the Red-Nosed Reindeer the most beloved holiday film, with 83% of respondents having a generally favorable response to the title.

=== Ratings ===
When Rudolph the Red-Nosed Reindeer premiered on NBC, it was seen by 55% of the U.S. audience. In 1999, Rudolph the Red-Nosed Reindeer received 1,292,000 viewers on Global and 1,107,000 viewers during three broadcasts on YTV in Canada. The 60th anniversary broadcast on NBC was the most-watched rerun Christmas special across all networks in 2024, with 5,300,000 viewers; among all Christmas specials in 2024, it was second only to another NBC broadcast, Christmas in Rockefeller Center.

== Controversy ==
The special was published (and continues to be aired) with an invalid copyright notice, which identifies the year of publication as 1164 instead of the intended 1964 due to an omission of an M digit in the Roman numeral.

The original version did not include Santa traveling to the Island of Misfit Toys to pick up the toys. According to Jules Bass, viewers wanted to see the scene and wrote letters. The scene was later animated and added in 1965.

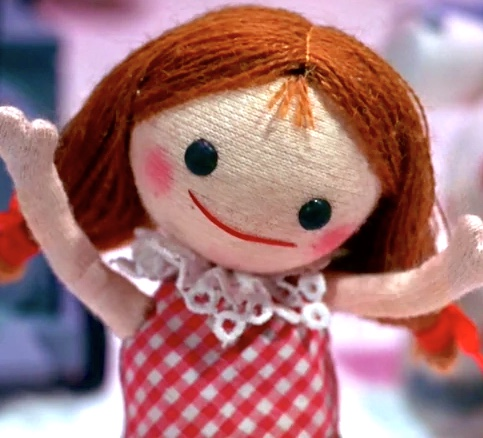
Dolly for Sue, a character from the television special

According to The Making of the Rankin/Bass Holiday Classic: Rudolph the Red-Nosed Reindeer, nothing in the script gave any indication on why Dolly for Sue is a misfit toy. When interviewed by historian Rick Goldschmidt, Rankin explained: "She was cast off by her mistress and clinically depressed, and they didn't have Prozac back then."

From 2005 to 2023, CBS broadcast an edited version of the special, which included the compression of several scenes. Although "We're a Couple of Misfits" remained, the audio was played over the video of "Fame and Fortune", a song that has replaced "We're a Couple of Misfits" in airings starting in 1965 before the original song was added in 1998. The audio was also edited to match the video despite not matching the movements of the characters. Rankin/Bass historian Rick Goldschmidt also criticized the edit of the special, commenting: "Somebody there did a really crappy job of editing it." Freeform and NBC's current broadcasts do not have this issue, instead using the same print as Universal's home video releases.

== Aftermath and cultural impact ==
=== Actors' residuals and compensations ===
Ives and his estate received annual residuals from the show. "This business of residuals was new to our union, which was not quite as strong as SAG or others in the States", Soles recalled in 2014. After the first three broadcasts, the rest of the voice actors did not receive residuals for the characters due to ACTRA's labor costs. However, Richards received residuals for three years, and as of 2007, Soles received $400 in residuals ($10 for each year). Each of them received approximately $1,000 for their work throughout the years. While Richards said in 2000 that her compensation was a "sore subject" for her, she had no complaints about the work itself. "I feel so lucky to have something that has made such an impact on people, and it's because of the story first and foremost." Goldschmidt once offered to get Richards some money to sign her signature on Rudolph's collectibles, but Richard's agent informed her that the offer was too vague.

=== Restored figures of Rudolph and Santa ===
Since those involved with the production had no way of knowing the future value of the stop-motion puppet figures used in the production, many were not preserved. Rankin-Bass historian Rick Goldschmidt revealed that a few puppets were still in the possession of people who worked on the special. Most of the extant figures are "publicity" copies for the NBC headquarters, which were created and used for photography and other purposes. Nine puppets—including Santa and young Rudolph—were displayed at the NBC headquarters in Manhattan. They were going to be thrown away, but they were given to Rankin's secretary, Barbara Adams. Adams gave them to her nieces and nephews, who played with them under the Christmas tree. After Christmas, the figures were stored in an attic. The heat caused several figures to melt together and they had to be thrown away.

In 2005, a nephew of Adams found the figures of Rudolph and Santa and brought them to be appraised on Antiques Roadshow; the episode aired in 2006 on PBS. At that time, their figures were listed on EBay, and their appraised value was between $8,000 and $10,000. The puppets had been damaged through years of rough handling by children and storage in an attic. The family later sold both figures to TimeandSpaceToys.com president Kevin A. Kriess. Kriess confirmed that he bought them after he shared photos and knew about the history. Kriess had both puppets restored by Screen Novelties, a Los Angeles-based collective of film directors specializing in stop-motion animation, with puppet fabricator Robin Walsh leading the project. The figures have been shown at conventions since then. They were sold at auction on November 13, 2020. netting a $368,000 sale price, doubling the expected return. On December 22, 2020, they were donated to the Center for Puppetry Arts in Atlanta.

== Merchandise ==
A Rudolph the Red-Nosed Reindeer video game was released on November 9, 2010. The adaptation was published by Red Wagon Games for the Wii and Nintendo DS, and was developed by High Voltage Software and Glyphic Entertainment respectively. The Wii version was received poorly, and garnered extremely negative reviews from sites such as IGN giving it a 1.5/10.

== Sequels ==
The Rankin/Bass special inspired numerous television sequels made by the same studio:

- Rudolph's Shiny New Year (1976), a special that first aired on ABC and is still aired annually on both ABC and Freeform.
- Rudolph and Frosty's Christmas in July (1979), a feature-length special that paired Rudolph with the song-inspired character Frosty the Snowman.
- Rudolph the Red-Nosed Reindeer and the Island of Misfit Toys (2001), a direct-to-video animated film. Released by a team that produced an unrelated Rudolph movie in 1998, neither Rankin/Bass or its descendant companies had any involvement in its production.
- Rudolph the Red-Nosed Reindeer - 4D Attraction (2016), 10-minute stop motion story adaptation in the form of a 4D film for SimEx-Iwerks; produced by Bent Image Lab and directed by Chel White.
- T.E.A.M. Rudolph and the Reindeer Games (2018), a short film adaptation of the book of the same name was featured on the original film's 2018 Blu-ray release

== See also ==
- Christmas elf § In films and television
- List of animated feature films
- List of Christmas television specials
- List of Rankin/Bass Productions films
- List of stop-motion films
- Rudolph the Red-Nosed Reindeer (video game)

== Bibliography ==
- Goldschmidt, Rick (2001). Ranney, Doug (ed.). The Making of the Rankin/Bass Classic: Rudolph the Red-Nosed Reindeer. Miser Bros. Press. ISBN 0971308101.
