= Rudolph and Frosty's Christmas in July =

1979 American–Japanese feature film/television special

- The original released advertisement poster for the film's theatrical release.
- Directed by: Arthur Rankin Jr. Jules Bass
- Screenplay by: Romeo Muller
- Produced by: Arthur Rankin, Jr.; Jules Bass
- Starring: Red Buttons; Ethel Merman; Mickey Rooney; Alan Sues; Jackie Vernon; Shelley Winters; Paul Frees; Billie Mae Richards; Hal Peary; Shelby Flint; Don Messick
- Cinematography: Akikazu Kono; ("Animagic" supervisor)
- Music by: Johnny Marks
- Production company: Rankin/Bass Productions
- Distributed by: Avco Embassy Pictures
- Release date: June 8, 1979; (Lexington)
- Running time: 97 minutes
- Country: United States
- Language: English

Rudolph and Frosty's Christmas in July (titled on-screen as Rudolph and Frosty: Christmas in July) is a 1979 American Christmas/Independence Day film produced by Rankin/Bass Productions, featuring characters from the company's holiday specials Rudolph the Red-Nosed Reindeer (1964) and Frosty the Snowman (1969), among others. It was filmed in Japan using the company's trademark "Animagic" stop-motion animation style. The film was originally a theatrical film released on June 8, 1979, in Lexington, Kentucky, through Avco Embassy Pictures, where it ran for only one week; the film's expansion to other cities was quietly cancelled. Later that year, on November 25, the film premiered on television in the US on ABC.

This is the last Rankin/Bass production to star Billie Mae Richards as Rudolph and Jackie Vernon as Frosty. Mickey Rooney reprises his role as Santa Claus from Santa Claus Is Comin' to Town (1970) and The Year Without a Santa Claus (1974). Additional voices are provided by Red Buttons, Ethel Merman, Alan Sues, and Paul Frees. Shelley Winters and Frees reprise their roles as Frosty's wife Crystal and Jack Frost, respectively, from Frosty's Winter Wonderland, and Hal Peary reprised his role as Big Ben the Clockwork Whale from Rudolph's Shiny New Year. This is the final Rankin/Bass production to use Rudolph and Frosty, and the only one to feature the latter in stop-motion form. All other specials and films starring the characters are produced by other companies.

== Plot ==
Long ago, a powerful, evil snow wizard named Winterbolt caused havoc on the North Pole until Lady Boreal, Queen of the Northern Lights, put him in a deep sleep. Years later, Winterbolt awakens and Boreal transfers the last of her power into Rudolph's red nose when he is born, which will stop glowing if it is ever used for evil. Winterbolt learns of this and plans to dispose of Rudolph. Meanwhile, an ice cream man named Milton arrives in an hot-air balloon and tells Rudolph and Frosty that he plans to marry Lilly Loraine's daughter Lainie if they star in the Circus by the Sea to get the circus out of debt since a crook named Sam Spangles wants to buy the circus after the Fourth of July.

Winterbolt offers Frosty and his family magic amulets to keep them from melting, which will only last until the final firework fades on the Fourth. Santa agrees to pick them up before the magic wears off, but Winterbolt creates a blizzard to prevent him and Mrs. Claus from arriving on time. He then goes to the Caves of Lost Rejections and recruits an unintelligent, nasty reindeer named Scratcher, who is jealous because he wanted to be one of Santa's reindeer, but was fired when Santa hired Rudolph. They, alongside Spangles, plan to get Rudolph to steal from the circus, which will make him appear to be evil and rid him of his magic.

Meanwhile, Frosty discovers Scratcher's conspiracy and wants to help Rudolph. Winterbolt takes advantage of Frosty as well by agreeing to help Rudolph in exchange for his hat, intending to use it to create an army of evil snowmen. Rudolph manages to defeat Winterbolt, gets the hat back, and his nose regains its glow.

Rudolph returns to the circus with a police officer named Officer Kelly who exonerates him and returns Frosty's hat and the circus money, bringing him back to life. Winterbolt arrives and tries to attack everyone, but Lilly breaks his scepter using her iron pistols, causing him to turn into a tree. After this, Sam is arrested, Scratcher disappears, and all of Winterbolt's spells wear off, but Frosty and his family melt as their amulets are no longer active.

However, Rudolph's old friend Big Ben arrives in time with Jack Frost who brings Frosty and his family back to life. Santa and Mrs. Claus arrive to help Jack Frost take the snow family back home while Rudolph stays behind to help the circus until they are out of debt and leads the flying circus parade with the circus animals who can now fly with some of Santa’s magic feed corn.

== Voice cast ==
- Billie Mae Richards as Rudolph
- Jackie Vernon as Frosty
- Mickey Rooney as Santa Claus
- Red Buttons as Milton
- Alan Sues as Scratcher
- Darlene Conley as Mrs. Claus
- Shelby Flint as Laine Loraine
- Ethel Merman as Lilly Loraine
- Paul Frees as Winterbolt, Keeper of the Cave, Jack Frost and Officer Kelly
- Thurl Ravenscroft as the Genie of the Ice Scepter
- Candy Candido as the Snow Dragons
- Don Messick as Sam Spangles, Donner, Santa's Cuckoo Clock and clowns
- Hal Peary as Big Ben the Clockwork Whale
- Shelley Winters as Crystal
- Nellie Bellflower as Lady Boreal
- Steffi Cali as Milly
- Eric Hines as Chilly

== Songs ==
Title pages

- "Rudolph the Red-Nosed Reindeer" – Chorus
- "Everything I've Always Wanted" – Crystal
- "Everything I've Always Wanted (reprise)" – Milton
- "Everyday is Just Like Christmas" – Lily
- "Chicken Today and Feathers Tomorrow" – Lily
- "I See Rainbows" – Santa, Chorus
- "Don't Let the Parade Pass You By" – Lily
- "I Heard the Bells on Christmas Day" – Chorus
- "Rockin' Around the Christmas Tree" – Laine, Chorus
- "Everything I've Always Wanted (second reprise) – Frosty
- "No Bed of Roses" – Rudolph
- "Frosty the Snowman" – Chorus
- "Now and Then" – Frosty
- "We're a Couple of Misfits" – Frosty and Rudolph
- "Rudolph the Red-Nosed Reindeer (reprise)" – Lily, Chorus

== See also ==
- Rudolph the Red-Nosed Reindeer (1964) (Note: Recurring characters include Rudolph (voiced by Billie Mae Richards), Santa Claus (voiced by Stan Francis), and Mrs. Claus (voiced by Peg Dixon) in this special. Various actors portray the other reindeer.)
- Frosty the Snowman (1969) (Note: Recurring characters include Frosty the Snowman (voiced by Jackie Vernon), Santa (voiced by Paul Frees), and Professor Hinkle Tinkerton (voiced by Billy De Wolfe) in this special. Santa's reindeer also feature.)
- Santa Claus Is Comin' to Town (1970) (Note: Recurring characters include Santa (voiced by Mickey Rooney), Mrs. Jessica Claus (voiced by Robie Lester), and S.D. Kluger (voiced by Fred Astaire) in this special. Rudolph and Santa's other reindeer also feature.)
- Here Comes Peter Cottontail (1971) (Note: Recurring characters include the Easter Bunny (voiced by Casey Kasem), and Santa (voiced by Frees) in this special. Santa's reindeer also feature.)
- 'Twas the Night Before Christmas (1974) (Note: Recurring characters in this special include Santa (voiced by Allen Swift), alongside his featured reindeer.)
- The Year Without a Santa Claus (1974) (Note: Recurring characters include Santa (voiced by Rooney), Mrs. Claus (voiced by Shirley Booth), Snow Miser (voiced by Dick Shawn), Heat Miser (voiced by George S. Irving), and Mother Nature (voiced by Rhoda Mann) in this special. Rudolph and Santa's other reindeer also feature.)
- The First Easter Rabbit (1976) (Note: Recurring characters include Easter Bunny (voiced by Robert Morse and Burl Ives), and Santa (voiced by Frees) in this special. Santa's reindeer also feature.)
- Frosty's Winter Wonderland (1976) (Note: Recurring characters include Frosty (voiced by Vernon), Mrs. Crystal Frosty (voiced by Shelley Winters), and Jack Frost (voiced by Frees) in this special.)
- Rudolph's Shiny New Year (1976) (Note: Recurring characters include Rudolph (voiced by Richards) and Santa (voiced by Frees) in this special. Santa's other reindeer also feature.)
- The Easter Bunny Is Comin' to Town (1977) (Note: Recurring characters include Easter Bunny (voiced by Skip Hinnant), and S.D. Kluger (voiced by Astaire) in this special.)
- Nestor, the Long-Eared Christmas Donkey (1977) (Note: Recurring characters in this special include Santa (voiced by Frees), alongside Rudolph and his other featured reindeer.)
- The Stingiest Man in Town (1978) (Note: Recurring characters in this special include Santa Claus during a scene which compares the Ghost of Christmas Present to him (both characters were voiced by Frees).)
- Jack Frost (1979) (Note: The recurring character is Jack Frost (voiced by Robert Morse) in this special.)
- Rudolph and Frosty's Christmas in July (1979) (Note: Recurring characters include Rudolph (voiced by Richards), Frosty (voiced by Vernon), Santa (voiced by Rooney), Mrs. Claus (voiced by Darlene Conley), Crystal (voiced by Winters), and Jack Frost (voiced by Frees) in this special. Santa's other reindeer also feature.)
- Pinocchio's Christmas (1980) (Note: The recurring characters in the special include Santa (voiced by Swift), alongside his featured reindeer.)
- Frosty Returns (1992) (Note: The recurring character is Frosty (voiced by John Goodman) in this special. Mother Nature is also referenced in the short.)
- Rudolph the Red-Nosed Reindeer and the Island of Misfit Toys (2001) (Note: Recurring characters include Rudolph (voiced by Kathleen Barr), Santa (voiced by Garry Chalk), and Mrs. Claus (also voiced by Barr) in this film. Santa's other reindeer, and various other characters from the 1964 original also feature.)
- The Legend of Frosty the Snowman (2005) (Note: Recurring characters include Frosty (voiced by Bill Fagerbakke), and Professor Tinkerton (voiced by Kath Soucie) in this special.)
- A Miser Brothers' Christmas (2008) (Note: Recurring characters include Snow Miser (voiced by Juan Chioran), Heat Miser (voiced by Irving), Santa (voiced by Rooney), Mrs. Claus (voiced by Catherine Disher), and Mother Earth (voiced by Patricia Hamilton) in this special. Santa's reindeer also feature.)
