= The Leprechauns' Christmas Gold =

1981 Christmas TV special

- Genre: Christmas special
- Written by: Romeo Muller
- Directed by: Arthur Rankin Jr. Jules Bass
- Narrated by: Art Carney
- Countries of origin: United States; Japan
- Original language: English

Production
- Producers: Arthur Rankin Jr. Jules Bass
- Running time: 25 minutes
- Production company: Rankin/Bass Productions

Original release
- Network: ABC
- Release: December 23, 1981

The Leprechauns' Christmas Gold is a 1981 American stop motion Christmas television special produced by Rankin/Bass Productions. The initial script was meant to be a Saint Patrick's Day special. The special first aired on ABC on December 23, 1981.

== Plot ==
The leprechaun Blarney Kilakilarney narrates the story of cabin boy Dinty Doyle, who works on the ship Belle of Erin during its voyage to Dublin. Dinty is assigned to travel to a nearby island and procure a tree for Christmas Eve. He is observed by a family of leprechauns, who have not seen a human in two centuries. Before the leprechauns can stop him, Dinty digs up a tree that had imprisoned the banshee Old Mag.

Old Mag summons a storm after being freed. When the storm passes, a rainbow appears that leads Dinty to a clover patch containing the leprechaun's gold. Dinty encounters Blarney Kilakilarney, who initially takes Dinty for a thief before he explains himself.

As the two wait for their tea to cool, Blarney tells Dinty of the two clans of leprechauns, the gold-mining Kilakilarneys and shoe-making O'Clogjiggers. Blarney and his wife Faye O'Clogjigger lived for centuries happily married. Old Mag attempted to take the leprechauns' gold to sustain herself, as she will wither into teardrops without it. When Blarney refused to give Old Mag his gold, she caused an earthquake that broke off the leprechauns' stretch of land into the phantom isle of Thule. Blarney enlisted the aid of Saint Patrick, who managed to imprison her in a pine tree.

Old Mag secretly mixes Blarney's tea with a potion that will make him willingly give her the gold. Blarney attempts to resist the potion's effects, but is unable to do so. Instead of giving the gold to Old Mag, Blarney gives his gold to Dinty and makes him promise to protect it.

Dinty returns to the beach, only to find that the storm swept his boat away. He investigates the sound of crying and finds a woman named Colleen stranded on the beach who claims to have survived a shipwreck. Colleen suggests giving the gold to her so she can have the leprechauns build a ship for passage back to Ireland and share the remainder among the people of Killarney. Swayed by the fantasy, Dinty gives the gold to Colleen, who reveals herself to be Old Mag. Dinty attempts to revoke the deal, but Old Mag places a curse on him that will make him sleep for one hundred years.

Later on the beach, Blarney and his estranged family mourn Dinty. Faye apologizes to Blarney for being headstrong in her disbelief of Old Mag's tricks, while Blarney apologizes for putting gold ahead of his love for her, and the two reconcile. At that moment, Saint Patrick looks down approvingly from the sky and a rainbow appears. Dinty awakens from his cursed slumber, stating that the light of love freed him from the curse. Old Mag follows the rainbow to Blarney's stash of gold, only to be touched by the morning sunlight. She turns into tears and is washed away by a deluge. The Belle of Erin arrives to retrieve Dinty, who prepares to take the leprechauns with him so they can return to Ireland.

== Voice cast ==
- Art Carney as Blarney Kilakilarney/Narrator
- Peggy Cass as Faye Kilakilarney
- Ken Jennings as Dinty Doyle
- Bob McFadden as Old Mag and Grandpa Kilakilarney
- Gerry Matthews as Lord of the Leprechauns, Dad Kilakilarney and Belle of Erin Captain
- Christine Mitchell as Colleen
- Glynis Bieg and Frankie Moronski as The Children.

== Production ==
The Leprechauns' Christmas Gold is a 1981 American stop motion Christmas television special produced by Rankin/Bass Productions. When Romeo Muller first wrote the initial script it was meant to be Saint Patrick's Day special, but due to pressure from ABC it was repurposed as a special for the Christmas season. The songs were written by frequent Rankin/Bass composer Maury Laws with lyrics by Jules Bass who was credited under the pseudonym of Julian P. Gardner.

== Release ==
The special had its initial broadcast on ABC on December 23, 1981. ABC reaired the special on December 20, 1983 with subsequent airings from 1985 onward handled by Lorimar Television (since subsumed into Warner Bros. Discovery) in syndication. The series was rebroadcast on December 22, 1992 on The Disney Channel.

It is among the package of Rankin/Bass specials currently licensed to AMC as part of the Best Christmas Ever, and was formerly part of the 25 Days of Christmas on the Family Channel. AMC dropped The Leprechaun's Christmas Gold from the Best Christmas Ever lineup in 2023 but returned it in 2024.

=== Home video ===
The first home video release of The Leprechaun's Christmas Gold was on VHS through Lightning Video which was released on a tape with Frosty's Winter Wonderland. The special was subsequently released on DVD through the Warner Archive Collection as part of the Rankin/Bass TV Holiday Favorites Collection.

== Reception ==
During the week of its premiere broadcast, The Leprechaun's Christmas Gold managed to secure a ratings share of 15.3/26 and overall ranking 37th for the week.

== See also ==
- List of Christmas films
- List of Rankin/Bass Productions films
