= Frosty's Winter Wonderland =

1976 American Christmas TV special

- Title page
- Genre: Fantasy comedy Supernatural fiction
- Based on: "Frosty the Snowman" by Steve Nelson and Jack Rollins
- Written by: Romeo Muller
- Directed by: Arthur Rankin Jr. Jules Bass
- Starring: Dennis Day; Paul Frees; Jackie Vernon; Shelley Winters
- Narrated by: Andy Griffith
- Music by: Maury Laws
- Countries of origin: United States; Japan
- Original language: English

Production
- Producers: Arthur Rankin Jr. Jules Bass
- Cinematography: Toru Hara; Tsuguyuki Kubo
- Running time: 25 minutes
- Production companies: Rankin/Bass Productions; Topcraft Limited Company

Original release
- Network: ABC
- Release: December 2, 1976

Related
- Rudolph the Red-Nosed Reindeer (1964) (Note: Recurring characters include Rudolph (voiced by Billie Mae Richards), Santa Claus (voiced by Stan Francis), and Mrs. Claus (voiced by Peg Dixon) in this special. Various actors portray the other reindeer.); Frosty the Snowman (1969) (Note: Recurring characters include Frosty the Snowman (voiced by Jackie Vernon), Santa (voiced by Paul Frees), and Professor Hinkle Tinkerton (voiced by Billy De Wolfe) in this special. Santa's reindeer also feature.); Santa Claus Is Comin' to Town (1970) (Note: Recurring characters include Santa (voiced by Mickey Rooney), Mrs. Jessica Claus (voiced by Robie Lester), and S.D. Kluger (voiced by Fred Astaire) in this special. Rudolph and Santa's other reindeer also feature.); Here Comes Peter Cottontail (1971) (Note: Recurring characters include the Easter Bunny (voiced by Casey Kasem), and Santa (voiced by Frees) in this special. Santa's reindeer also feature.); 'Twas the Night Before Christmas (1974) (Note: Recurring characters in this special include Santa (voiced by Allen Swift), alongside his featured reindeer.); The Year Without a Santa Claus (1974) (Note: Recurring characters include Santa (voiced by Rooney), Mrs. Claus (voiced by Shirley Booth), Snow Miser (voiced by Dick Shawn), Heat Miser (voiced by George S. Irving), and Mother Nature (voiced by Rhoda Mann) in this special. Rudolph and Santa's other reindeer also feature.); The First Easter Rabbit (1976) (Note: Recurring characters include Easter Bunny (voiced by Robert Morse and Burl Ives), and Santa (voiced by Frees) in this special. Santa's reindeer also feature.); Frosty's Winter Wonderland (1976) (Note: Recurring characters include Frosty (voiced by Vernon), Mrs. Crystal Frosty (voiced by Shelley Winters), and Jack Frost (voiced by Frees) in this special.); Rudolph's Shiny New Year (1976) (Note: Recurring characters include Rudolph (voiced by Richards) and Santa (voiced by Frees) in this special. Santa's other reindeer also feature.); The Easter Bunny Is Comin' to Town (1977) (Note: Recurring characters include Easter Bunny (voiced by Skip Hinnant), and S.D. Kluger (voiced by Astaire) in this special.); Nestor, the Long-Eared Christmas Donkey (1977) (Note: Recurring characters in this special include Santa (voiced by Frees), alongside Rudolph and his other featured reindeer.); The Stingiest Man in Town (1978) (Note: Recurring characters in this special include Santa Claus during a scene which compares the Ghost of Christmas Present to him (both characters were voiced by Frees).); Jack Frost (1979) (Note: The recurring character is Jack Frost (voiced by Robert Morse) in this special.); Rudolph and Frosty's Christmas in July (1979) (Note: Recurring characters include Rudolph (voiced by Richards), Frosty (voiced by Vernon), Santa (voiced by Rooney), Mrs. Claus (voiced by Darlene Conley), Crystal (voiced by Winters), and Jack Frost (voiced by Frees) in this special. Santa's other reindeer also feature.); Pinocchio's Christmas (1980) (Note: The recurring characters in the special include Santa (voiced by Swift), alongside his featured reindeer.); Frosty Returns (1992) (Note: The recurring character is Frosty (voiced by John Goodman) in this special. Mother Nature is also referenced in the short.); Rudolph the Red-Nosed Reindeer and the Island of Misfit Toys (2001) (Note: Recurring characters include Rudolph (voiced by Kathleen Barr), Santa (voiced by Garry Chalk), and Mrs. Claus (also voiced by Barr) in this film. Santa's other reindeer, and various other characters from the 1964 original also feature.); The Legend of Frosty the Snowman (2005) (Note: Recurring characters include Frosty (voiced by Bill Fagerbakke), and Professor Tinkerton (voiced by Kath Soucie) in this special.); A Miser Brothers' Christmas (2008) (Note: Recurring characters include Snow Miser (voiced by Juan Chioran), Heat Miser (voiced by Irving), Santa (voiced by Rooney), Mrs. Claus (voiced by Catherine Disher), and Mother Earth (voiced by Patricia Hamilton) in this special. Santa's reindeer also feature.)

Frosty's Winter Wonderland is a 1976 American animated Christmas television special and a standalone sequel to the 1969 special Frosty the Snowman, produced by Rankin/Bass Productions and animated by Topcraft. It is the second television special featuring the character Frosty the Snowman. It returns writer Romeo Muller, character designer Paul Coker, Jr., music composer Maury Laws and actor Jackie Vernon as the voice of Frosty, while Andy Griffith stars as the narrator (replacing Jimmy Durante, who had been incapacitated by a stroke three years prior and retired from acting) with the rest of the cast consisting of Shelley Winters, Dennis Day and Paul Frees. The special premiered on ABC on December 2, 1976.

== Plot ==
Years have passed since Frosty the Snowman left for the North Pole, but when he hears about the first snowfall of the season, he decides to return. The children are overjoyed when Frosty comes back to play with them, but Jack Frost sees the fun that the children are having with Frosty and becomes jealous of him. When he learns about Frosty and his magic hat which brought him to life, he decides to steal it from Frosty so the children will love him more, but that night, while Frosty and the children are ice-skating at a frozen pond, Jack blows a wind to steal a horse's hat, believing it to be Frosty's.

Despite having fun, Frosty feels lonely when the children go home each night, so the children build him a wife they name Crystal, though they are unable to bring her to life until Frosty presents Crystal with a bouquet of frost flowers, which magically brings her to life. Just then, Jack uses a gust of icy wind to blow Frosty's hat off, making him inanimate, but Crystal makes a corsage out of snow, places it on Frosty's chest and gives him a kiss, bringing him back to life. Befuddled by Frosty's reanimation, Jack throws the hat back onto Frosty’s head. Frosty and Crystal run through the town and announce their wedding plans to the children. Parson Brown, the local preacher, assists the children in building a snow parson whom he brings to life with his Bible. When Jack tries to spoil the wedding with a blizzard, Frosty and Crystal reason with him and convince him to be the best man at the wedding. Jack accepts and Frosty and Crystal are married. Frosty, Crystal, and Jack have fun with the children all winter, but they notice the weather is starting to grow warm. Jack uses his powers to extend the winter. After Parson Brown warns them about the dangers of everlasting snow, the three decide to return to the North Pole. They skate to the train station where Frosty meets the Traffic Cop, whom Frosty has encountered before, and introduces him to his wife, which surprises him. At the train station, Frosty, Crystal, and Jack bid farewell to the children.

The seasons pass through spring and summer, and Griffith promises that "on one not so far away day, that first snowflake will fall."

== Cast ==
- Jackie Vernon as Frosty
- Shelley Winters as Crystal (also credited as Mrs. Frosty)
- Andy Griffith as himself (the narrator)
- Dennis Day as:
  - Parson Brown
  - Snow Parson
- Paul Frees as:
  - Jack Frost
  - Traffic Cop
- Shelly Hines as Elsie
- Manfreed Olea as a Child
- Eric Stern as a Child
- Barbara Jo Ewing as a Child
- The Wee Winter Singers as Children

== Production credits ==
- Producers/Directors – Arthur Rankin Jr., Jules Bass
- Writer – Romeo Muller
- Based on the Song "Frosty the Snowman" – Steve Nelson, Jack Rollins © 1951 Hill & Range Songs
- "Winter Wonderland" – Dick Smith, Felix Bernard © 1934 Bregman Vocco and Conn, Inc.
- Sound – John Curcio, Don Hahn, Dave Iveland, Tom Clack
- Animation – Toru Hara, Tsuguyuki Kubo
- Key Animation – Kazuyuki Kobayashi
- Background Design – Minoru Nishida
- Design – Paul Coker, Jr.
- Music Arranger/Conductor – Maury Laws

Rankin/Bass Productions, Inc. All rights reserved. ©MCMLXXVI.

== Television rights ==
An original advertisement for the special.

The rights to this special are held by Warner Bros. Television Distribution via Telepictures, which used to license the show to Freeform. The latter aired the special annually on its "25 Days of Christmas" marathon. In 2018, AMC took over the license for the special.

Because the ownership of the television rights to the Rankin/Bass library was split into two parts (one including all productions prior to September 1974 and one including all productions from that point onward) after the company's dissolution in 1987, Frosty's Winter Wonderland was separated from the original Frosty the Snowman special. As a result, CBS, the longtime broadcast rights holder to the original special, produced a companion sequel of its own, Frosty Returns, with a totally different cast, style and production staff. Today, the broadcast rights to the original are held by NBC, a sister company of the pre-September 1974 Rankin-Bass library owner, DreamWorks Classics.

== Home media ==
Frosty's Winter Wonderland was first released on a compilation VHS tape with the 1981 special The Leprechauns' Christmas Gold by Vestron Video's Lightning Video label in 1985. The same double-feature release was also available in Australia in 1989. Warner Home Video/Warner Bros. Family Entertainment (which owned the post-September 1974 Rankin/Bass Productions library via Telepictures) distributed the special for its second VHS release in 1992, and also released it on DVD in 2004 paired with the 1974 special 'Twas the Night Before Christmas. The DVD was re-released in 2011 & 2022 respectively.

== Culture ==
In the 1998 Warner Bros. film Jack Frost, Charlie Frost (Joseph Cross) shows his father Jack Frost (Michael Keaton) some scenes from the special while changing television channels.

== See also ==
- List of Christmas films
