= The Red Baron (1972 film) =

1972 animated TV special

- Title card
- Written by: Leonard Starr
- Directed by: Arthur Rankin Jr. Jules Bass
- Starring: Bob McFadden; Allen Swift; Bradley Bolke; Rhoda Mann
- Theme music composer: Maury Laws
- Countries of origin: United States; Japan
- Original language: English

Production
- Producers: Arthur Rankin Jr. (uncredited); Jules Bass (uncredited); Mary Alice Dwyer (uncredited)
- Running time: 45 minutes
- Production companies: Rankin/Bass Productions; Animation: Topcraft Limited Company

Original release
- Network: ABC
- Release: December 9, 1972

Related
- Tabitha and Adam and the Clown Family; Daffy Duck and Porky Pig Meet the Groovie Goolies

The Red Baron is a 1972 animated television special that aired on December 9, 1972, as an episode of the anthology series The ABC Saturday Superstar Movie. This is one of the four entries that Rankin/Bass Productions was involved with, and one of the three that Topcraft Limited Company served as a collaborative production company. The short includes a live-action segment near the end of the episode. It has also aired internationally on Channel 5 in the United Kingdom.

== Plot ==
This animated movie features the Red Baron, who is cast as a heroic blubbery old Corgi in a world set featuring anthropomorphic animals, mostly heroic dogs.

Prince Heinrich of Weinerburg (a Doberman) has fallen in love with Princess Sophie of Pretzelstein (a Pomeranian) and have run off together. But after listening to an emergency announcement on the radio that the Princess was reported to have been kidnapped as announced by the King and demanding that "all able-bodied men" to report at once to help rescue her, Baron von Richthofen otherwise known as The Red Baron comes out of retirement and decides to join the Flying Corps to take on the journey to rescue her. With the assistants of his inarticulate cat Putzi and wheezing dachshund assistant Fritz, he builds his own triplane and takes the job to fight, despite scorn from Captain Von Zipper and the other soldiers originally. The Red Baron later gets supported by them after proving worthy of an officer.

Mata Hari (in the form of a Pitbull) is suspected to be involved in the scheme and is considered a prime suspect. Later, she warms up to the Baron. The Baron does return with the Princess. However, she feels very sad because she actually prefers to be with the Prince of Weinerburg as they show legit affection to one another. After the Kings of Pretzelheim and Weinerburg's ongoing rivalry for years, they finally put aside their differences and work things out by becoming in-laws. But then, Catahari ends up chasing after the Baron as she still wants to be with him.

== Cast ==
- Bob McFadden
- Allen Swift
- Bradley Bolke as Schnitzel
- Rhoda Mann as Princess Sophie of Pretzelheim and Catahari

== Crew ==
- Executive Producer: Michael Webster
- Produced and directed by Arthur Rankin Jr. and Jules Bass (uncredited)
- Associate Producer: Mary Alice Dwyer
- Music: Maury Laws
- Editorial Supervision: Irwin Goldress and Vincent Juliano
- Sound Engineers: John Curcio
- Production Supervisor: Gregory Knapp
- Character Designs: Paul Coker Jr.
- Animation Supervision: Toru Hara

== Home media ==
This film was released on VHS in 1983 in the United Kingdom by Odyssey Video. And in 1985 in North America by Prism Entertainment in 1985 under the Children's Video Playground lineup. It was also re-released on VHS in the UK by Channel 5 Home Video in 1986.

There is also a Swedish dub of the film that was also released on VHS by Din Video, released as Röde Baronen.

However, among these home video releases, the synopsis for them falsely claim there are cat villains in the film with Putzi being the main villain that has kidnapped Princess Sophie, when it is actually Prince Heinrich that eloped with her. Putzi is actually the Red Baron's assistant.
