= Frosty the Snowman =

1950 Christmas song first recorded by Gene Autry

Single by Gene Autry and The Cass County Boys
- B-side: "When Santa Claus Gets Your Letter"
- Published: June 2, 1950 by Hill and Range Songs, Inc.
- Released: 1950
- Genre: Christmas
- Label: Columbia
- Songwriters: Walter "Jack" Rollins and Steve Nelson
- Producer: Hecky Krasnow

"Frosty the Snowman"

Single by Jimmy Durante
- B-side: "(Isn't It A Shame That) Christmas Comes But Once A Year"
- Released: 1950
- Genre: Christmas
- Label: MGM
- Songwriters: Walter Rollins & Steve Nelson

"Frosty the Snowman" is a song written by Walter "Jack" Rollins and Steve Nelson, and first recorded by Gene Autry and the Cass County Boys in 1950 and later recorded by Jimmy Durante in that year. It was written after the success of Autry's recording of "Rudolph the Red-Nosed Reindeer" the previous year. Rollins and Nelson shopped the new song to Autry, who recorded "Frosty" in search of another seasonal hit. Like "Rudolph", "Frosty" was subsequently adapted to other media including a 1969 television special.

== Song ==
The song's lyrics describe the adventures of Frosty, a snowman who comes to life after a group of children place a magical silk hat on his head. Frosty laughs and plays with the children until the hot sun threatens to melt him. After leading them through the village streets and running afoul of a traffic policeman, Frosty says goodbye to the children, reassuring them he'll be back again someday, while in the Jimmy Durante version, he says he'll be back on Christmas Day.

It is generally regarded as a Christmas song, although Christmas itself is never mentioned in the original lyrics. The action supposedly takes place in White Plains, New York, or Armonk, New York; Armonk has a parade dedicated to Frosty annually.

=== Covers ===
The song was quickly covered by many artists including Jimmy Durante featuring Jackie Vernon (who opens Durante's version by exclaiming "Happy birthday!"), Nat King Cole and Guy Lombardo. The versions by Nat King Cole and Guy Lombardo also reached the American charts. A Phil Spector-produced 1963 cover by The Ronettes is a popular version, featuring in Rolling Stone's list of "The Greatest Rock & Roll Christmas Songs".

The song has been covered as an instrumental by the Canadian Brass, with founder Charles Daellenbach taking on the persona of Frosty, and repeatedly calling "One more time!" ("You know what happens when Frosty gets 'hot'"), and then starting to collapse ("I think he's melting" -- "You know what happens when Frosty gets hot"). It was also covered by the Hampton String Quartet on their inaugural album, What if Mozart Wrote 'Have Yourself a Merry Little Christmas'. It was also recorded by American Brass.

The song has also been covered (with lyrics) by the band Cocteau Twins; the cover was released on their 1993 EP Snow. It was also covered by the Jackson 5 and appears on the Jackson 5 Christmas Album.

The song was covered and released as the first single of Tarja Turunen's third Christmas album and ninth studio album, Dark Christmas.

The song was covered by Conway Twitty on his 1983 album, Merry Twismas.

In 2026, the song was also covered by alternative pop artist Empress Of, following a commission from Apple Music exclusively for the platform's "Carols Covered" playlist.

=== Charts ===
Chart performance
Version	Year	Chart	Peak position
Gene Autry version	1950	US Pop Singles	7
Gene Autry version	1950	US Country Singles	4
Jimmy Durante version	1950	US Pop Singles	7
Jimmy Durante version	2019	US Rolling Stone Top 100	44
Nat King Cole version	1950	US Pop Singles	9
Guy Lombardo version	1950	US Pop Singles	28
Perry Como version	1957	US Pop Singles	74
Jan and Dean version	1963	US Pop Singles	11
Johnny Mathis version	2003	US Adult Contemporary	29
Kimberley Locke version	2007	US Hot Adult Contemporary Tracks	1
Kimberley Locke version	2007	Canadian Adult Contemporary	40
Kimberley Locke version	2007	Billboard Top AC Songs of 2008	46
Whitney Wolanin version	2012	US Adult Contemporary (Billboard)	13

=== Gene Autry version ===
==== Weekly charts ====
Weekly chart performance
Chart (2026)	Position
Russia Streaming (TopHit)	84

==== Monthly charts ====
Monthly chart performance
Chart (2026)	Peak position
Russia Streaming (TopHit)	82

==== Decade-end charts ====
20s Decade-end chart performance
Chart (2025–2026)	Position
Russia Streaming (TopHit)	124

=== Certifications and sales ===
==== The Ronettes cover ====
Region	Certification	Certified units/sales
United Kingdom (BPI)	Gold	400,000^{‡}
United States (RIAA)	Gold	500,000^{‡}
^{‡} Sales+streaming figures based on certification alone.

==== Ella Fitzgerald cover ====
Region	Certification	Certified units/sales
United Kingdom (BPI)	Silver	200,000^{‡}
^{‡} Sales+streaming figures based on certification alone.

==== Michael Bublé and The Puppini Sisters cover ====
Region	Certification	Certified units/sales
United Kingdom (BPI)	Silver	200,000^{‡}
^{‡} Sales+streaming figures based on certification alone.

== Book ==
In 1950, Little Golden Books published Frosty the Snow Man as a children's book, adapted by Annie North Bedford and illustrated by Corinne Malvern.

== 1950 short film ==
In 1950, the UPA studio brought "Frosty" to life in a three-minute animated short which appears regularly on WGN-TV. This production included a bouncy, jazzy a cappella version of the song and a limited animation style reminiscent of UPA's Gerald McBoing-Boing. The short, filmed entirely in black-and-white, has been a perennial WGN-TV Christmas classic, and was broadcast on December 24 and 25, 1955, and every year since, as part of a WGN-TV children's programming retrospective, along with their two other short Christmas classics, Suzy Snowflake and Hardrock, Coco and Joe. The short had previously been telecast annually on WGN's The Bozo Show, Ray Rayner and His Friends, and Garfield Goose, along with its two other companion cartoons. The three cartoons are also a tradition on WJAC-TV in Johnstown, Pennsylvania, which not only broadcasts the cartoons on their station, but also makes them available on their website.

== Adaptations ==
In 1969, Rankin/Bass Productions produced a 25-minute television special, Frosty the Snowman, featuring the animation of Japanese studio Mushi Production, and the voices of comedians Jimmy Durante as the narrator (who also sings a version of the song), Billy De Wolfe as Professor Hinkle and Jackie Vernon as Frosty. Paul Frees and June Foray both also voice characters including Karen and Santa Claus in this animated special produced and directed by Arthur Rankin Jr. and Jules Bass and designed by Mad artist Paul Coker. This was a story based on the discovery of Frosty the Snowman.

Three sequels followed:

- Frosty's Winter Wonderland (1976), based upon the song "Winter Wonderland"
- Rudolph and Frosty's Christmas in July (1979)
- The Legend of Frosty the Snowman (2005) Bill Fagerbakke took over as Frosty's voice after Vernon's death.

Frosty Returns (1992) is a sequel to the original song, set in a separate fictional universe from the other specials, with John Goodman as the voice of Frosty defending the value of snow against Mr. Twitchell (Brian Doyle-Murray), the maker of a snow-removal spray.

On July 1, 2020, a live-action film adaptation of Frosty the Snowman was announced to be in development at Warner Bros. Pictures and Stampede Ventures, with Jason Momoa voicing the titular snowman, Jon Berg and Greg Silverman producing alongside Geoff Johns, Roy Lee and Momoa, and David Berenbaum writing the screenplay. Following Ray Fisher's accusation of mistreatment on the set of Justice League, Momoa defended Fisher and claimed that the Frosty the Snowman movie announcement was made without his permission and accused Warner Bros. of releasing the story in order to distract from Fisher's comments.
