= Rudolph the Red-Nosed Reindeer (video game) =

2010 video game

- Wii version cover art
- Developers: High Voltage Software (Wii); Glyphic Entertainment (DS)
- Publisher: Red Wagon Games
- Director: Joanna Rockwood
- Designer: Rob Nicholls
- Composer: Jeff Conary
- Platforms: Wii, Nintendo DS
- Release: NA: November 11, 2010
- Genre: Adventure
- Mode: Single-player

Rudolph the Red-Nosed Reindeer is a video game loosely based on the 1964 television special of the same name. The game was released by Red Wagon Games for both Wii and Nintendo DS on November 11, 2010. However, the developers of the two versions differ: the Wii game was developed by High Voltage Software while the developer of the DS version is American studio Glyphic Entertainment.

In Rudolph the Red-Nosed Reindeer, the players compete in four different minigames, with each game having its own motion controls. Each minigame has a time limit. Once the time limit is up, the minigame is finished. Up to two players can participate at a time.

The Wii version received generally negative reviews, with criticism for its simplistic minigames and short length.

== Gameplay ==
"Holiday Helper". The first mini-game in Rudolph the Red-Nosed Reindeer.

In this game, players compete in four different minigames, with each game having its own motion controls. Each minigame has a time limit. Once the time limit is up, the minigame is finished. Up to two players can participate at a time. In the first three minigames, up to 5 characters may be selected. In the final minigame, an elf may be chosen. Every time a minigame is completed, a different character may be selected. Once all four minigames have been completed, the game is over. Any of the minigames may be replayed once the story is completed.

=== Minigames ===
In the first minigame, Holiday Helper, the player bounces presents under the tree, lights and stockings onto the tree, and dolls and toys into Santa's bag. In the second minigame, titled Toy Maker, the player paints toys. The third game, Cookie Cooking, involves the player baking cookies for Mrs. Claus. In the fourth and final minigame, Saving Christmas, the player delivers toys by dropping them onto houses.

== Development ==
On July 23, 2025, a remake of Rudolph the Red-Nosed Reindeer was announced for the PlayStation 5, PlayStation 4, Xbox Series X/S, Nintendo Switch, and Steam. The remake was developed by Headless Chicken games and published by Gamemill Entertainment on September 26. A port for the Nintendo Switch 2, titled Rudolph the Red-Nosed Reindeer - Holiday Play Edition, is set to release on October 16, 2026.

== Reception ==
Reception

Review score
Publication	Score
IGN	1.5/10

The Wii version has faced generally negative reviews. In its review by IGN it was rated 1.5/10, and was criticized for its lack of gameplay and its grainy visual effects. Kristine Steimer of IGN, who noticed the lack of a four-player mode, said that the game only took ten minutes to beat, and criticized the controls during the "Holiday Helper" minigame.
