= Willie Mays and the Say-Hey Kid =

1972 television special directed by Jules Bass

- Title card
- Written by: Romeo Muller
- Directed by: Arthur Rankin Jr. Jules Bass
- Starring: Willie Mays; Tina Andrews; Paul Frees; Ernestine Wade
- Theme music composer: Maury Laws
- Countries of origin: United States; Japan
- Original language: English

Production
- Producers: Arthur Rankin Jr. Jules Bass
- Cinematography: Toru Hara
- Editor: Irwin Goldress
- Running time: 43 minutes
- Production companies: Rankin/Bass Productions; Topcraft Limited Company

Original release
- Network: ABC
- Release: October 14, 1972

Willie Mays and the Say-Hey Kid is a 1972 American traditionally-animated television special produced by Rankin/Bass Productions. The special aired on October 14, 1972, as part of The ABC Saturday Superstar Movie.

== Plot ==
A guardian angel agrees to help Willie Mays win the National League Pennant, if Mays agrees to take care of Veronica, a lonely, mischievous orphan girl. Veronica makes Mays' life difficult, but when relatives show up to claim her after hearing that she's inherited money, Mays' heart softens.

== Cast ==
- Willie Mays as Himself
- Tina Andrews as Veronica, Additional voices
- Paul Frees as Guardian Angel, Uncle Emory, Additional voices
- Ernestine Wade as Veronica's aunt

== Crew ==
- Produced and Directed by Arthur Rankin, Jr. and Jules Bass
- Teleplay by Romeo Muller
- Associate Producer: Basil Cox
- Music: Maury Laws
- Editorial Supervision: Irwin Goldress
- Sound Engineers: Jim Harris and John Boyd
- Animation Supervision: Toru Hara

== See also ==
- List of films about angels
