= Frosty Returns =

1992 American animated Christmas television special

- Title card
- Genre: Christmas; Family
- Based on: "Frosty the Snowman" by: Steve Nelson; Walter E. "Jack" Rollins
- Written by: Oliver Goldstick
- Story by: Jim Lewis
- Directed by: Evert Brown; Bill Melendez
- Voices of: Jonathan Winters; Jan Hooks; Andrea Martin; Brian Doyle-Murray; Elisabeth Moss; Michael Patrick Carter; John Goodman
- Music by: Mark Mothersbaugh
- Country of origin: United States
- Original language: English

Production
- Executive producer: Lorne Michaels
- Producers: Eryk Casemiro; Bill Melendez
- Cinematography: Nick Vasu
- Editors: Chuck McCann; Warren Taylor
- Running time: 23 minutes
- Production companies: Bill Melendez Productions; Broadway Video; CBS Entertainment Productions

Original release
- Network: CBS
- Release: December 1, 1992

Related
- Frosty the Snowman (TV special)

Frosty Returns is an American animated Christmas television special directed by Bill Melendez and Evert Brown, starring the voices of Jonathan Winters as the narrator, John Goodman as Frosty the Snowman, and Brian Doyle Murray as Mr. Twitchell. It is the fourth special in a series beginning with Rankin/Bass Animated Entertainment's 1969 television adaptation of Steve Nelson and Walter E. "Jack" Rollins's 1950 holiday song. It was produced by Bill Melendez Productions in association with Broadway Video and CBS Entertainment Productions in 1992. It premiered on CBS on December 1, 1992, and released on VHS by Family Home Entertainment as part of their "Christmas Classics Series" line on September 15, 1993.

== Plot ==
In the town of Beansboro, the local elementary school is canceled for the day due to a seven-inch snowfall. While the adults incessantly complain about the problems they have to deal with due to the snow and ice, the children enjoy the opportunity to play outside in the snow.

Meanwhile, a young aspiring magician named Holly DeCarlo practices a magic act with her tone-deaf nerd friend named Charles, who has a knack for climatology. However, the wind blows Holly's hat off her head and onto a snowman who comes to life as Frosty, thus revealing that Holly's hat was "that old silk hat" featured in the original song and previous adaptations.

A new product appears in Beansboro: an aerosol spray called "Summer Wheeze" that causes snow to instantly disappear, posing a fatal threat to Frosty. Summer Wheeze's inventor, Mr. Twitchell, hopes to use the product to win over the people of Beansboro and be crowned King of the Beansboro Winter Carnival, apparently believing that the title will give him actual dominion over them. At a presentation before the town council, a trustee voices concern about the environmental impact of the untested product; Twitchell orders his pet cat, Bones, to open a trapdoor beneath her seat.

To Twitchell's delight, and Holly's and Frosty's dismay, Beansboro embraces Summer Wheeze, jeopardizing Frosty's existence. The next day in school, shortly after explaining to Holly about snow's virtues, the children now cheer the end of winter; Holly and Charles become Frosty's protectors, hiding him in a freezer and securing refuge for him in an ice castle built for the Carnival.

Later, Holly gets Frosty to appear at the Winter Carnival and successfully persuade the townspeople that snow is worth keeping around. Twitchell furiously aims his truck toward Frosty hoping to run him over, but Bones commandeers the steering wheel to avoid hitting the humans and crashes the truck into the lake.

Frosty is unanimously declared King. As he rides in the royal toboggan past the lake with Holly and Charles, they help a repentant Twitchell and Bones out of the ice water as Frosty offers Twitchell his cape, crown and a ride in the toboggan before Twitchell leaves town. Frosty disembarks the toboggan in pursuit of another adventure but vows to return someday.

== Voice cast ==
- Jonathan Winters as The Narrator
- John Goodman as Frosty
- Elisabeth Moss as Holly DeCarlo
- Michael Patrick Carter as Charles
- Brian Doyle-Murray as Mr. Twitchell
- Andrea Martin as Ms. Carbuncle
- Jan Hooks as Lil DeCarlo
- Phillip Glasser and Mindy Ann Martin as The Kids
- Steve Stoliar as The News Announcer/The Townspeople/Mr. Twitchell’s Goons
- Gail Lynch as The Townspeople/Mearle/The Objective Woman
- Bill Melendez as Bones the Cat

== Production ==
An original advertisement for the special coupled with the 1969 Frosty the Snowman, as is commonplace though the two shorts were produced by different studios.

Contrary to its title and consistent pairing with the 1969 Frosty the Snowman special, the two were produced by different companies (Rankin/Bass produced the original, while this special was made by Lorne Michaels' Broadway Video, with help from longtime Peanuts director Bill Melendez, for CBS), and Frosty Returns makes no effort to establish itself in the 1969 special's fictional universe, using different characters, setting and voice actors. Because of Michaels' involvement, most of the cast consisted of sketch comedians from Michaels's other shows; Andrea Martin had starred in The Hart and Lorne Terrific Hour, while Jan Hooks and Brian Doyle-Murray were cast members on Saturday Night Live (a show where John Goodman had made frequent guest appearances). Since Broadway Video produced this special and owned the 1969 original prior to Golden Books' acquisition of the Videocraft International catalog in 1996, Frosty Returns followed the CBS showings of the original and is coupled with the original on most DVD releases; it was not included in the package sold to Freeform's 25 Days of Christmas cable telecasts, nor the package sold to AMC's Best Christmas Ever.

2023 was the final year that CBS aired the special. When CBS relinquished its rights to Frosty the Snowman to NBC in 2024, CBS opted not to continue airing Frosty Returns, while NBC also chose not to carry the special despite Michaels's long association with that network through his work with SNL and The Tonight Show Starring Jimmy Fallon; NBC instead paired the original Frosty special with Shrek the Halls and the 1966 version of How the Grinch Stole Christmas. Frosty Returns is not available on any streaming service as of 2024, but it is available on VHS, DVD and Blu-ray.

== Soundtrack ==
The soundtrack for Frosty Returns was composed by Mark Mothersbaugh; two songs are featured prominently on the soundtrack:

- "Frosty the Snowman":
  - At the beginning of the film, an instrumental version plays at the beginning of the film.
  - A full-cast version plays over the closing credits.
- "Let There Be Snow": an original song created for the special; the song has three verses sung at various points.

== See also ==
- Frosty's Winter Wonderland
- List of Christmas films
