= Rankin/Bass Animated Entertainment =

American production company

- Formerly: Videocraft International (1960–1968, officially 1960–1974); Rankin/Bass Productions (1968–1983)
- Type: Subsidiary
- Industry: Film
- Predecessor: Arthur Rankin Jr. Associates
- Founded: September 14, 1960; 66 years ago
- Founders: Arthur Rankin Jr. Jules Bass
- Defunct: 2001
- Fate: Dissolved, assets absorbed into Warner Bros. Entertainment
- Successor: Universal Pictures Home Entertainment
- Headquarters: New York City, U.S.
- Products: Television specials Television series Feature films
- Parent: Tomorrow Entertainment (1971–1974); Telepictures (1983–1987); Lorimar-Telepictures (1987–1989); Warner Bros. Entertainment (1989–2001)

Rankin/Bass Animated Entertainment (founded and formerly known as Videocraft International, Ltd. and Rankin/Bass Productions, Inc.) was an American animation studio located in New York City. It was known for its seasonal television specials, usually done in stop motion animation. Rankin/Bass's stop-motion productions are recognizable by their visual style of doll-like characters with spheroid body parts.

Nearly all of the studio's animation was outsourced to Japanese animation companies, such as Toei Animation, MOM Production, Mushi Productions and Topcraft. Rankin/Bass was one of the first Western studios to outsource their low-budget animated television and film productions to animation studios in foreign countries; the others that already practiced animation outsourcing include Total Television and King Features Syndicate TV in New York City; and Hanna-Barbera and Jay Ward Productions in Los Angeles, California.

== History ==
The company was founded in New York City by Arthur Rankin Jr. and Jules Bass on September 14, 1960, as Videocraft International, Ltd. The majority of Rankin/Bass' work, including all of their "Animagic" stop-motion productions (which they were well known for), were created in Tokyo, Japan. Throughout the 1960s, the Animagic productions were headed by Japanese stop-motion animator Tadahito Mochinaga at his studio, MOM Production. He was credited for his supervision as "Tad Mochinaga".

Rankin/Bass' traditional animation output was done by several animation studios such as Toei Animation, Eiken (formerly known as TCJ), Dentsu, Mushi Production, and especially Topcraft, which was formed on February 1, 1972, by Toei animator Toru Hara (who was credited as an animation supervisor in some of Rankin/Bass' specials). While several of Topcraft's staff, including Hara and industry legends such as Hayao Miyazaki, established Studio Ghibli in the wake of Topcraft's closure, others formed another studio: Pacific Animation Corporation, which continued working on Rankin/Bass' titles until it was bought by Disney in 1988.

In addition to the "name" talent that provided the narration for the specials, Rankin/Bass had its own company of voice actors. For the studio's early work, this group was based in Toronto, Ontario, where recording was supervised by veteran CBC announcer Bernard Cowan. The Canadian group included actors such as Paul Soles, Larry D. Mann, Billie Mae Richards, Paul Kligman and Carl Banas.

Maury Laws served as musical director for almost all of the animated films and television programs. Romeo Muller was another consistent contributor, serving as screenwriter for many of Rankin/Bass' best-known productions including Rudolph the Red-Nosed Reindeer (1964), The Little Drummer Boy (1968), and Frosty the Snowman (1969).

=== Output ===
One of Videocraft's first projects was an independently produced television series in 1961, The New Adventures of Pinocchio, based on the Italian author Carlo Collodi's 1883 novel The Adventures of Pinocchio and featuring "Animagic", a stop motion animation process using figurines or puppets (a process already pioneered by George Pal's "Puppetoons" and Art Clokey's Gumby and Davey and Goliath), managed by Mochinaga and his MOM Production staffers for Videocraft with Dentsu. This was followed by another independently produced series in 1961, Tales of the Wizard of Oz, Videocraft's adaptation of the 1900 novel The Wonderful Wizard of Oz by L. Frank Baum, as well as their first production to use traditional cel animation. Unlike many of Rankin/Bass' works, Tales of the Wizard of Oz was animated by Crawley Films in Ottawa, headed by F. R. Crawley.

==== Rudolph era ====
One of the mainstays of the business was holiday-themed animated specials for airing on American television. In 1964, the company produced a special for NBC and sponsor General Electric, later owner of NBC. It was a stop motion animated adaptation of Robert L. May's 1939 story "Rudolph the Red-Nosed Reindeer" and the 1949 song it inspired, "Rudolph the Red-Nosed Reindeer", written by May's brother-in-law, Johnny Marks. Almost two decades earlier, in 1948, it had been made into a cartoon by Max Fleischer, brother and former partner of Dave Fleischer, as a traditional cel animated short for the Jam Handy Film Company.

With the American actor Burl Ives in the role of Sam the snowman, the narrator, Canadian actress Billie Mae Richards as the voice of the main title character, Rudolph, and an original orchestral score composed by Marks himself, Rudolph became one of the most popular, and longest-running Christmas specials in television history: it remained with NBC until around 1972 when it moved to CBS. In 2019, for its 55th anniversary, the special was also aired on Freeform as part of its "25 Days of Christmas" programming block, although it continued to air on CBS under a separate license with Universal, but in 2024, it came back to NBC for its 60th anniversary.

The special contained seven original songs. In 1965, a new song was filmed in "Animagic" to replace "We're a Couple of Misfits", titled "Fame and Fortune".

The success of Rudolph led to numerous other Christmas specials. The first was The Cricket on the Hearth in 1967, with two live-action announcements by Danny Thomas, continuity and character designs by Don Duga and Paul Coker, and animation by Jiro Yanase's TCJ, followed by the 1968 Thanksgiving special The Mouse on the Mayflower, told by Tennessee Ernie Ford and animated by Kenzo Masaoka, Sanae Yamamoto, and Yasuji Murata's Toei Animation. Paul Coker Jr. would go on to design characters and production for more than 40 Rankin-Bass specials and episodes.

==== Other holiday specials ====
Many of their other specials, like Rudolph, were based on popular Christmas songs. In 1968, the British-American actress Greer Garson provided dramatic narration for The Little Drummer Boy, based on the traditional song and set during the birth of the baby Jesus Christ, and starring the Puerto Rican actor José Ferrer as the voice of Ben Haramed. During that year, Videocraft International, Ltd. (whose logo dominated the Rankin/Bass logo in the closing credit sequences) changed its name to Rankin/Bass Productions, Inc., and adopted a new logo, retaining a Videocraft byline in their closing credits until 1971 when Tomorrow Entertainment, a unit of the General Electric Company, acquired the production company. The "Animagic" process for The Little Drummer Boy took place at MOM Production, which was renamed Video Tokyo Production after Tadahito Mochinaga left Japan for his return trip to China following the completion of the animation for Mad Monster Party?, thus ending his collaboration with Rankin/Bass. Takeo Nakamura, the director of Sanrio's 1979 stop motion feature Nutcracker Fantasy, was among the "Animagic" team, but he was never credited as a supervisor.

The following year, in 1969, Jimmy Durante sang and told the story of Frosty the Snowman, with Jackie Vernon voicing Frosty. It was based on Steve Nelson and Jack Rollins' 1950 song of the same name, and also introduced Billy De Wolfe as the voice of Professor Hinkle, a greedy magician who tries to steal away the magic hat that brought Frosty to life to become a billionaire. Mushi Production, an animation studio founded in 1961 and formerly led by the manga artist Osamu Tezuka (creator of Astro Boy, Kimba the White Lion and Ambassador Magma), handled the animation for the special with supervision by Yusaku "Steve" Nakagawa, a layout artist and character designer from Hanna-Barbera Productions in Los Angeles, California.

The year 1970 brought another Christmas special, Santa Claus Is Comin' to Town. Rankin/Bass enlisted Fred Astaire as narrator S.D. (Special Delivery) Kluger, a mailman answering children's questions about Santa Claus and telling his origin story. The story involved young Kris Kringle, voiced by Mickey Rooney, and the villainous Burgermeister Meisterburger, voiced by Paul Frees. Kringle later marries the town's schoolteacher, Miss Jessica, voiced by Robie Lester. Kizo Nagashima, the associate director of Rankin/Bass' previous productions, was credited as a production supervisor.

In 1971, Rankin/Bass produced their first Easter television special, Here Comes Peter Cottontail, with the voices of Danny Kaye as the narrator Seymour S. Sassafrass, Vincent Price as the evil rabbit January Q. Irontail, and Casey Kasem from Hanna-Barbera's Scooby-Doo franchise as the title character Peter Cottontail. It was not based upon the title song by Steve Nelson and Jack Rollins, but on a 1957 novel by Priscilla and Otto Friedrich titled The Easter Bunny That Overslept. This was the second and final "Animagic" production to be supervised by Kizo Nagashima. Steve Nakagawa was also involved in this special as a continuity designer. In 1977, Fred Astaire returned as S. D. Kluger in The Easter Bunny Is Comin' to Town, telling the tale of the Easter Bunny's origins. From there, Rankin/Bass used Masaki Iizuka as an associate producer, and Akikazu Kono as an "Animagic" supervisor. Back in 1973, Iizuka was the production assistant of Marco—a live-action musical film based on the biography of Italian merchant, explorer, and writer Marco Polo, filmed at Toho Company in Tokyo and on location throughout East Asia, and featuring Kono's "Animagic" sequence of the Tree People. Previously, he was met by Rankin during the animation production of the Halloween television special Mad, Mad, Mad Monsters at Mushi Production in 1972, and became an integral part of Rankin/Bass for many years.

In 1974, Rankin/Bass Productions was relaunched once again as an independent production company and produced another Christmas special for television, The Year Without a Santa Claus, featuring Shirley Booth, voicing narrator Mrs. Claus; Mickey Rooney, returning as the voice of Santa Claus; and supporting characters Snow Miser (voiced by Dick Shawn) and Heat Miser (voiced by George S. Irving). It was the first Rankin/Bass "Animagic" production on which Akikazu Kono and puppet maker Ichiro Komuro share in the production supervision. It was remade as a poorly received live-action/special effects TV movie shown on NBC in 2006 starring Delta Burke and John Goodman as Mrs. Claus and Santa.

Throughout the 1970s, Rankin/Bass, with Video Tokyo and the former Toei Animation employee Toru Hara's Topcraft, continued to produce animated sequels to its classic specials, including the teaming of Rudolph and Frosty in 1979's Rudolph and Frosty's Christmas in July, with the voice of Ethel Merman as Lilly Loraine, the ringmistress of a seaside circus, and Rooney again returning as Santa. The special features cameos by characters from several other Rankin/Bass holiday specials, including Big Ben the Clockwork Whale from Rudolph's Shiny New Year and Jack Frost from Frosty's Winter Wonderland. Later that year, Jack appeared in his own special, Jack Frost. Narrated by Buddy Hackett, it tells the story of the winter sprite's love for a mortal woman menaced by the evil Cossack king, Kubla Kraus (Paul Frees, in addition to Kubla, voiced Jack Frost's overlord, Father Winter). In this special, Jack's voice was performed by Robert Morse, who previously voiced Stuffy in 1976's The First Easter Rabbit (loosely based on Margery Williams' The Velveteen Rabbit), and young Ebenezer Scrooge in 1978's The Stingiest Man in Town (based on Charles Dickens' A Christmas Carol).

Among Rankin/Bass' original specials was 1975's The First Christmas: The Story of the First Christmas Snow, featuring the voice of Angela Lansbury (who also starred in the 1982 adaptation of The Last Unicorn) as the narrating and singing nun, Sister Theresa, and Irving Berlin's Christmas classic "White Christmas".

Their final stop-motion style Christmas story was The Life and Adventures of Santa Claus, taken from the L. Frank Baum story of the same name and released in 1985. In this story, the Great Ak (voiced by Alfred Drake) summons a council of the Immortals to bestow upon a dying Claus (voiced by Earl Hammond, with J.D. Roth voicing the young Claus) the Mantle of Immortality. To make his case, the Great Ak tells Claus's life story, from his discovery as a foundling in the magical forest and his raising by Immortals, through his education by the Great Ak in the harsh realities of the human world, and his acceptance of his destiny to struggle to bring joy to children. This special has recently been released as part of Warner Bros. Home Entertainment's Warner Archive Collection, on a double-feature disc that also contains Nestor, the Long-Eared Christmas Donkey which is often paired with The First Christmas on holiday broadcasts.

Many of these specials are still shown seasonally on American television, and some have been released on VHS, Betamax, LaserDisc, DVD, Blu-ray, and Digital.

==== Non-holiday output ====
Throughout the 1960s, Videocraft produced other stop motion and traditional animation specials and films, some of which were non-holiday stories. 1965 saw the production of Rankin/Bass' first theatrical film, Willy McBean and His Magic Machine, another joint venture between Videocraft and Dentsu. 1966 brought The Daydreamer, the first of three films to be produced in association with executive producer Joseph E. Levine's Embassy Pictures in Los Angeles, California, and the film adaptation of the stories and characters by the Danish author Hans Christian Andersen, which combines live-action, special effects and "Animagic"; and The Ballad of Smokey the Bear, the story of the famous forest fire-fighting bear seen in numerous public service announcements, narrated by James Cagney.

The theatrical feature film Mad Monster Party? saw theatrical release in the spring of 1967, featuring one of the last performances by the British actor Boris Karloff. The film features affectionate send-ups of classic movie monsters and their locales, adding "Beatle"-wigged skeletons as a send-up of the era's pop bands, and a writing staff borrowed from Mad magazine, including the cartoonist Jack Davis, who designed the characters of this film. It is also the last "Animagic" project that Tadahito Mochinaga supervised.

In 1972 and 1973, Rankin/Bass produced four animated TV movies for The ABC Saturday Superstar Movie series: Mad Mad Mad Monsters (with the animation by Mushi), Willie Mays and the Say-Hey Kid, The Red Baron, and That Girl in Wonderland (all featuring the animation by Topcraft).

In 1977, Rankin/Bass produced an animated version of J. R. R. Tolkien's The Hobbit. It was followed in 1980 by an animated version of The Return of the King (the animation rights to the first two volumes were held by Saul Zaentz, producer of Ralph Bakshi's animated adaptation The Lord of the Rings). Other books adapted include The Last Unicorn by Peter S. Beagle, a rare theatrical release that was co-produced with ITC Entertainment in London, England, Peter Dickinson's The Flight of Dragons and Kenneth Grahame's The Wind in the Willows which was animated by the second overseas animation unit of Hanna-Barbera, James Wang's Cuckoo's Nest Studios (now Wang Film Productions) in Taipei, Taiwan.

In addition to their prime time specials, Rankin/Bass produced several regular television shows in traditional animation, including The King Kong Show (1966),The Smokey Bear Show (1969), animated by Toei Animation, The Reluctant Dragon & Mr. Toad Show (1970), animated by Mushi Production, The Tomfoolery Show (1970) animated by Halas and Batchelor Animation, Ltd., The Jackson 5ive in 1971 (the latter co-produced with Motown Productions), and Kid Power and The Osmonds in 1972. The most successful of these was Ted Wolf's ThunderCats in 1985, an action-adventure series based on his related line of toys. It was followed by two similar TV shows about humanoid animals, SilverHawks in 1986, and TigerSharks, as part of the series The Comic Strip in 1987. Each of those four series was mainly animated by former Topcraft employees' Pacific Animation Corporation, with production management by Masaki Iizuka, just before the studio was bought by Disney and renamed Walt Disney Animation Japan in 1988. Neither one enjoyed the same commercial success as ThunderCats did, however.

Rankin/Bass also attempted live-action productions, such as 1967's King Kong Escapes, a co-production with Toho; 1976's The Last Dinosaur; 1978's The Bermuda Depths; 1980's The Ivory Ape (all co-produced with Tsuburaya Productions, the creators of the Ultra Series); and 1983's The Sins of Dorian Gray. With the exception of King Kong Escapes, all were made-for-television films.

=== Demise ===
After its last series output, Rankin/Bass shut down its production company on March 4, 1987.

Arthur Rankin Jr. would split his time between New York City, where the company still had its offices, and his home in Bermuda. Rankin died at Harrington Sound, Bermuda on January 30, 2014, at the age of 89. Bass became a vegetarian; a decade later, he wrote Herb, the Vegetarian Dragon, the first children's book character developed specifically to explore moral issues related to vegetarianism. The original story and a follow-up cookbook became bestsellers for independent publishing house Barefoot Books. Bass died on October 25, 2022, at the age of 87.

In 1999, Rankin/Bass joined forces with James G. Robinson's Morgan Creek Productions and Nest Family Entertainment (creators of The Swan Princess franchise) for the first and only animated adaptation of Rodgers and Hammerstein's musical The King and I, based on a treatment by Rankin. Distributed by Warner Bros. Pictures with its Warner Bros. Family Entertainment division, the film flopped at the American box office. Stephen Hunter, among several American film critics, criticized the film's depictions of "offensive ethnic stereotyping."

In 2001, Fox aired the first new original Christmas special to be produced by both Rankin and Bass in 16 years, Santa, Baby!, which like most of their production company's other specials was based on a popular, similarly-titled Christmas song. Santa, Baby! stood out from its predecessors due to its use of African-American characters and voice performers, such as Patti LaBelle (the narrator), Eartha Kitt, Gregory Hines, Vanessa L. Williams and Tom Joyner. Although Pacific Animation Corporation was responsible for the overseas animation production of the special with the background art provided by Atelier BWCA and the See Throu Studio, some of the animation services were done at Steven Hahn's Hanho Heung-Up in Seoul, South Korea. Santa, Baby! turned out to be the final Rankin/Bass-produced special; the Rankin/Bass partnership was officially dissolved shortly after, with most of its remaining assets acquired by Warner Bros. Entertainment. The company last existed legally as TPIX Subsidiary Corp.

Currently, Rankin/Bass' pre-September 1974 library (including works from Videocraft International) is owned by Universal Pictures, which acquired DreamWorks Animation's DreamWorks Classics portfolio, while Skydance Corporation owns the rights to the post-September 1974 library. Universal also retained the rights to King Kong Escapes and also currently holds the rights to Willy McBean and his Magic Machine, again, via DreamWorks Classics. StudioCanal holds the rights to the films from Rankin/Bass that Embassy Pictures distributed, with American distribution rights split between Rialto Pictures and Lionsgate (excluding The Daydreamer, the American distribution rights to which are with Scorpion Releasing) while ITV Studios currently holds the rights to The Last Unicorn, with select distribution rights currently licensed to Shout! Studios. The rights to the 1999 animated film adaptation of The King and I are currently held by Morgan Creek Entertainment, with distribution handled by Revolution Studios.

== Legacy ==
For over 20 years, most of Rankin/Bass' films were shown on Family Channel, Fox Family, ABC Family, and Freeform, during the 25 Days of Christmas seasonal period. Starting in 2018, the post-September 1974 specials moved to AMC, and aired during the Best Christmas Ever seasonal period, with Freeform retaining the pre-September 1974 specials' cable rights. The original Rudolph and Frosty specials currently air on NBC, and Santa Claus on ABC.

The specials of Rankin/Bass have been parodied by the likes of television series from Saturday Night Live to South Park, while non-holiday works like The Last Unicorn maintained a cult following. The look and style of the Christmas specials heavily influences more modern holiday classics such as Elf (2003).

Beginning in 2013, and for several years thereafter, the animation studio ShadowMachine was hired by the SoCal Honda Dealers group (via Secret Weapon Marketing) to create stop-motion animated commercials in the style of Rankin/Bass's Christmas specials.

RiffTrax, consisted of former Mystery Science Theater 3000 alumni Kevin Murphy, Bill Corbett and Michael J. Nelson, spoofed Nestor the Long-Eared Christmas Donkey on December 17, 2006 (this time with just Nelson himself riffing).

In 2022, an agreement between Warner Bros. and NBCUniversal (co-founders of Studio Distribution Services, LLC and co-owners until 2026) was made to release The Complete Rankin-Bass Christmas Collection as a nine-disc DVD box set with a 24-page booklet and special features. (Universal Pictures Home Entertainment is the publisher of record for the set.) The box set features eighteen specials, comprising every stand-alone, Rankin-Bass produced Christmas special aside from Santa, Baby! A Blu-ray version of the set was released in 2023.

== Franchises ==
Title	Release date
Rudolph the Red-Nosed Reindeer	1964–1979
The Little Drummer Boy	1968–1976
Frosty the Snowman	1969–1979
Santa Claus Is Comin' to Town	1970–1979
