= Jackie Vernon (comedian) =

American comedian (1924–1987)

- Born: Ralph Verrone; March 29, 1924; New York City, U.S.
- Died: November 10, 1987 (aged 63); Los Angeles, California, U.S.
- Education: City College of New York
- Spouse: Hazel Sawyer (m. 1958)
- Children: 3 (with Sawyer)

Comedy career
- Years active: 1950–1987
- Medium: Stand-up, film, television
- Genres: Observational comedy, slapstick

Jackie Vernon (born Ralph Verrone; March 29, 1924 – November 10, 1987) was an American comedian and actor who was best known for his role as the voice of Frosty the Snowman in the Rankin/Bass Productions Christmas special Frosty the Snowman (1969) and its sequel, Frosty's Winter Wonderland (1976).

== Early life ==
Jackie Vernon was born Ralph Verrone on March 29, 1924, in New York City. After attending and graduating from high school, he attended the City College of New York before enlisting and serving in the United States Air Force. He began his entertainment career in 1955, performing standup comedy in small nightclubs and hotel lounges across the country.

== Career ==
Vernon was known for his gentle, low-key delivery and self-deprecating humor. He has been hailed as "the king of deadpan". His signature opening line was "To look at me now, it's hard to believe I was once considered a dull guy."

Early in the 1950s, according to Dick Brooks, Vernon bounced around the country working whatever standup comedy jobs he could find, mostly in strip clubs and hotel lounges. He then worked New York City and was often seen at Hanson's Drug Store, a place where small-time comedians would congregate. In 1963, he was noticed while performing standup at a nightclub in Windsor, Ontario, where Steve Allen was in attendance, and Allen invited Vernon to appear on his late-night television show Celebrity Talent Scouts, which launched Vernon's career.

During the 1960s, Vernon occasionally worked as the opening act for both Dean Martin and Judy Garland and was a regular fixture on The Merv Griffin Show.

Vernon was also known to perform darker sketches, such as his tragic attempt to turn a watermelon into a house pet. Plagued by strange occurrences and misfortune, Vernon would tell of traveling all the way to see the Grand Canyon, only to find that it was closed. He also told of the time when he went to see a fistfight and a hockey game ensued.

One of his early bits was the "Vacation Slide Show". No slides were visible; they were presumably off-screen as he described them, using a hand-clicker to advance to each "slide":

(click) Here I am, tossing coins at the toll booth.
(click) Here I am, under the car, looking for the coins.
(click) Here I am, picking up a hitchhiker.
(click) Here is the hitchhiker holding me up.
(click) Here I am, hitchhiking.
(click) Here's the hitchhiker picking me up with my own car. Luckily, she didn't recognize me.

Vernon was once a trumpet player and often carried a cornet with him as a prop during his standup routines. As with Henny Youngman and his violin, it was seldom actually played. When he guested on a summer variety program hosted by Al Hirt in 1965, he appeared with his cornet and said, "I play like I'm Hirt." He was a popular figure on The Ed Sullivan Show and other variety shows, on which he often ended his act by blowing a cornet and saying, "I think I hurt myself!"

Vernon often appeared on the Dean Martin Celebrity Roast and was a fixture on the dais at the original live Friars Club roasts before and after the televised versions. Vernon's signature deadpan expression and delivery often had the roast audiences laughing hysterically, long before the punch line of the jokes. On December 6, 1972, one of Vernon's recorded concerts was released as an album titled Sex Is Not Hazardous to Your Health. Vernon's X-rated, story-style jokes about people engaging in extreme sexual depravity became legend, often with the added tagline, "and I thought to myself... what a neat guy!"

Vernon also starred in Wayne Berwick's 1979 cult film Microwave Massacre, in which he plays a lascivious construction builder who kills his bossy wife for preparing him too many microwaved "gourmet" meals.

=== Charlie Chaplin ===
Vernon said that for the first few years after starting standup in the 1950s, he would write letters to his hero, Charlie Chaplin, although he never received a reply. After Vernon became famous and began appearing on television, he stopped writing to Chaplin. During an appearance in Las Vegas, the hotel management informed him that Chaplin would be in the audience that night. Vernon walked to Chaplin's table, and as he started to introduce himself, Chaplin interrupted him, saying, "Of course, Jackie Vernon. Tell me: why did you stop writing?"

=== Frosty the Snowman ===
Vernon supplied the voice of the title character of the Rankin-Bass television special Frosty the Snowman (1969), which was broadcast annually on CBS for more than 50 years after its debut. He later reprised the voice in two more Rankin-Bass specials: Frosty's Winter Wonderland (1976) and Rudolph and Frosty's Christmas in July (1979).

== Personal life ==
Vernon was married to Hazel Sawyer. They had three children: David, Lisa, and Tracey. In 2025, his son David revealed Vernon had at least three marriages before Hazel Sawyer, had several sons all named Ralph after his own birth name, and had abandoned all three earlier families. Vernon never disclosed the marriages until one of his wives angrily tracked him down. David also revealed Vernon had struggled with an addiction to quaaludes.

Vernon died at his home in Hollywood on November 10, 1987, from a heart attack at age 63. His wife died on March 21, 2006, at the age of 77.

== Discography ==
- A Wet Bird Never Flies at Night (Jubilee JGM 2052, 1964)
- A Man and His Watermelon (United Artists UAL 3577, 1967)
- The Day My Rocking Horse Died (United Artists UAS 6679, 1969)
- Sex Is Not Hazardous to Your Health (Beverly Hills BH 1133, 1972)

== Filmography ==
- That's Life (1968–1969)
- The Monitors (1969) - Himself (cameo)
- Frosty the Snowman (1969) - Frosty (voice)
- The Dean Martin Show (1970)
- Night Gallery (1971) - Chatterje
- The Gang That Couldn't Shoot Straight (1971) - Herman
- A Touch of Grace (1973) - Bartender
- Kolchak: The Night Stalker (1975) - Coach Toomey
- Frosty's Winter Wonderland (1976) - Frosty (voice)
- CHiPs (1977–1979) - Park Employee, Bert
- Rudolph and Frosty's Christmas in July (1979) - Frosty (voice)
- Microwave Massacre (1979) - Donald
- Mafia on the Bounty (1980) - Capuzzi
- The Woman Inside (1981) - Support Group Leader
- Faerie Tale Theatre (1986) - Phlegmatic Jack (episode: "The Princess Who Had Never Laughed")
- Amazon Women on the Moon (1987) - Roast Participant (final role)
