= Peg Dixon =

Canadian actress (1923–2015)

- Born: Margaret Elizabeth Dixon; August 23, 1923; Winnipeg, Manitoba, Canada
- Died: c. October 26, 2015 (aged 92); Vancouver, British Columbia, Canada
- Spouse: Ed McNamara (m. 1951)
- Children: 4
- Parents: Walter Arthur Dixon (father); Emmeline Mabel Ross (mother)

Margaret Elizabeth Dixon (23 August 1923 – c. 26 October 2015), credited as Peg Dixon, was a Canadian actress. She was best known for her voice acting in Spider-Man. She was married to Ed McNamara.

She was also in an episode with Rob Paulsen. In the mid-1970s, Peg changed her name to Melissa, at the suggestion of her numerologist.

== Selected filmography ==
TV
Year	Title	Role	Notes
1952–1953	Sunshine Sketches	Lillian Drone	
1956	Anne of Green Gables	Mrs. Morrison	TV movie
1964	Rudolph the Red-Nosed Reindeer	Mrs. Claus	voice
1967–1970	Spider-Man	Various roles, including Mary Jane Watson, Betty Brant, Aunt May, Martha Connors	voice; 52 episodes
1969–1970	Strange Paradise	Ada Desmond Thaxton	
1972	Festival of Family Classics	Cinderella	voice; 6 episodes
