= Topcraft =

Japanese animation studio

Topcraft Co., Ltd.
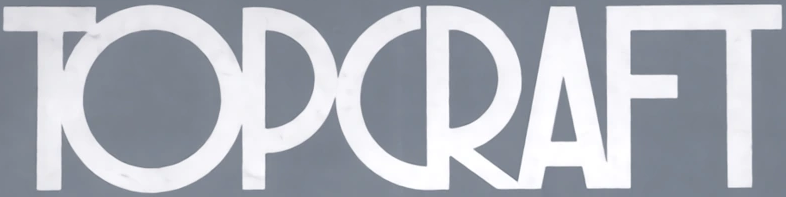
- Native name: 株式会社トップクラフト
- Industry: Animated films, Animated television shows
- Founded: February 1, 1972; 54 years ago
- Founder: Toru Hara
- Defunct: June 15, 1985; 41 years ago
- Fate: Bankruptcy, studio assets were acquired forming and renaming the company to Studio Ghibli
- Successor: Studio Ghibli; Pacific Animation Corporation
- Headquarters: Tokyo, Japan
- Products: Anime, animated feature films, Television animated series

Topcraft Co., Ltd. (Japanese: 株式会社トップクラフト, Hepburn: Kabushiki-gaisha Toppukurafuto), also written as "Top Craft", was a Japanese animation studio established in 1972, by former Toei Animation producer Toru Hara, and located in Tokyo, Japan. It was famous for the production of Nausicaä of the Valley of the Wind (1984), Hayao Miyazaki's theatrical anime film adaptation of his 1982–94 manga series. Topcraft is well known for its collaboration for hand-drawn animation titles by Rankin/Bass Productions (New York City, US). Together, they produced several well-known animated television specials and feature films, including The Hobbit (1977) and The Return of the King (1980).

== History ==
The studio was founded on February 1, 1972, by former Toei Animation staff, including Toru Hara. In its early years, Topcraft served as the primary animation studio for Rankin/Bass's hand-drawn animated productions. Notable works include The Hobbit (1977), The Return of the King (1980), and The Last Unicorn (1982). These projects contributed to the studio's international reputation. A significant turning point for Topcraft was its involvement in the production of Nausicaä of the Valley of the Wind (1984), directed by Hayao Miyazaki.

Despite its achievements, Topcraft faced financial difficulties and filed for bankruptcy, leading to its dissolution on June 15, 1985, essentially splitting the studio in half. Hayao Miyazaki, Toshio Suzuki and Isao Takahata acquired the assets and formed Studio Ghibli after the advice of Tokuma Shoten Topcraft's founder, Toru Hara, became Studio Ghibli's first manager. Other animators of Topcraft later formed another studio, called Pacific Animation Corporation and headed by Masaki Iizuka, to continue working with Rankin/Bass on television shows like ThunderCats and Silverhawks, but eventually joined Ghibli once Pacific Animation was bought out by The Walt Disney Company and became Walt Disney Animation Japan. Some animators, like Tsuguyuki Kubo, went to work for other studios, such as Studio Pierrot, working on Naruto and Bleach for them. Toru Hara died on December 14, 2021, at the age of 85.

== Works ==
=== Productions ===
Title	Year	In partnership with
Barbapapa	1974–1975	K&S
Easter Fever	1980	Nelvana
The Wizard of Oz	1982	Toho and Wiz Corporation
Nausicaä of the Valley of the Wind	1984	Tokuma Shoten Publishing and Hakuhodo
Adventures of the Little Koala	1984–1985	Hakuhodo
Button Nose	1985–1986	Sanrio

=== Co-productions ===
Title	Year	Main studio
Onbu Obake	1972–1973	Eiken
Adventures of Korobokkle	1973–1974	Eiken
Jim Button	1974–1975	Eiken
Time Bokan	1975–1976	Tatsunoko
Paul's Miraculous Adventure	1976–1977	Tatsunoko
Ippatsu Kanta-kun	1977–1978	Tatsunoko
The Dragon That Wasn't (Or Was He?)	1983	Rob Houwer Film

=== Collaborative works in partnership with Rankin/Bass ===
Title	Year
Kid Power	1972–1974
'Twas the Night Before Christmas	1974
The First Easter Rabbit	1976
Frosty's Winter Wonderland	1976
The Hobbit	1977
The Stingiest Man in Town	1978
The Return of the King	1980
The Flight of Dragons	1982
The Last Unicorn	1982
The Coneheads	1983

=== Contributive works ===
Title	Year	Company	Notes
The Jackson 5ive	1971–1972	Rankin/Bass and Halas & Batchelor	Topcraft was one of the animation cooperation studios.
The Osmonds	1972–1973	Rankin/Bass and Halas & Batchelor	Topcraft was one of the animation cooperation studios.
Festival of Family Classics	1972–1973	Rankin/Bass	Topcraft was the main animation studio for episodes 4–5 and 19.
The ABC Saturday Superstar Movie	1972–1973	Rankin/Bass	Topcraft was the main animation studio for episodes 6, 14 and 17.
Mazinger Z	1972–1974	Toei Animation Company, Ltd.	Topcraft was the main animation studio for episodes 55, 60, 64, 70, 76, 82, 84, 87 and 89.
Gatchaman	1972–1974	Tatsunoko	Topcraft was one of the animation cooperation studios.
Maya the Bee	1975–1976	Nippon Animation	Topcraft was one of the animation cooperation studios.
Lupin III: Part II	1977–1980	Tokyo Movie Shinsha	Topcraft was the main animation studio for episodes 24, 29, 109, 114, 119, 122, 124 and 128.
Doctor Snuggles	1979–1980	PolyScope Production	Topcraft was the main animation studio for episodes 1 to 7.
Jarinko Chie	1981–1983	Tokyo Movie Shinsha	Topcraft was the main animation studio for episodes 42, 45, 49 and 51.
Kojika Monogatari	1983–1985	MGM/UA Television and MK Company	Topcraft was the main animation studio for episodes 11–12, 14, 22–23, 27, 29 and 32.
Lensman	1984	Madhouse and MK Company	Topcraft was one of the animation cooperation and photography studios.
Magical Fairy Persia	1984–1985	Studio Pierrot	Key animation
Sherlock Hound	1984–1985	Tokyo Movie Shinsha	Topcraft was the main animation studio for episode 24.
Galactic Patrol Lensman	1984–1985	Madhouse and Academy Productions	Topcraft was one of the animation cooperation studios.
Star Musketeer Bismarck	1984–1985	Studio Pierrot	Topcraft was the main animation studio for episodes 27 and 29.
Sangokushi	1985	Shin-Ei Animation	Topcraft was one of the production cooperation studios.
ThunderCats	1985	Rankin/Bass and Leisure Concepts	Topcraft was the main animation studio for the first season.
The Smurfs	1985–1986	Hanna-Barbera Productions and SEPP International S.A.	Topcraft was the foreign studios dubbed in Japanese for the first season.
