= Walter E. "Jack" Rollins =

American musician (1906–1973)

Background information
- Born: September 15, 1906; Scottdale, Pennsylvania, U.S.
- Died: January 1, 1973 (aged 66) Cincinnati, Ohio (buried Queens Meadow Point Cemetery, Keyser, West Virginia)
- Genres: Country music
- Occupations: Songwriter

Walter Engle "Jack" Rollins (September 15, 1906 – January 1, 1973) was an American musician born in Scottdale, Pennsylvania and raised in Keyser, West Virginia.

== Career ==
In collaboration with his writing partner, Steve Nelson, Rollins wrote the lyrics to holiday favorites Here Comes Peter Cottontail, Frosty the Snowman, and Smokey the Bear.

Rollins was creditied in writing multiple country songs for artists such as Gene Autry, Hank Snow, George Jones, Eddy Arnold and Jimmy Durante.
