= The Legend of Frosty the Snowman =

2005 direct-to-video Christmas film

- Title page
- Written by: Emily Kapnek; Romeo Muller
- Directed by: Greg Sullivan
- Starring: Kath Soucie; Bill Fagerbakke; Tom Kenny; Jeannie Elias; Evan Gore; David Jeremiah; Grey DeLisle; Tress MacNeille; Kenny Blank; Larry Miller; Candi Milo; Tara Strong; Vernee Watson-Johnson
- Narrated by: Burt Reynolds
- Music by: Jared Faber
- Countries of origin: United States; Canada; Philippines (Note: As stated in the ending credits.)
- Original language: English

Production
- Producers: Evan Baily; Kathy Antonsen Rocchio; Blair Peters; Chris Bartleman
- Running time: 68 minutes
- Production companies: Sony Wonder; Studio B Productions; Classic Media; Top Draw Animation

Original release
- Network: Cartoon Network
- Release: October 18, 2005

Related
- Rudolph the Red-Nosed Reindeer (1964) (Note: Recurring characters include Rudolph (voiced by Billie Mae Richards), Santa Claus (voiced by Stan Francis), and Mrs. Claus (voiced by Peg Dixon) in this special. Various actors portray the other reindeer.); Frosty the Snowman (1969) (Note: Recurring characters include Frosty the Snowman (voiced by Jackie Vernon), Santa (voiced by Paul Frees), and Professor Hinkle Tinkerton (voiced by Billy De Wolfe) in this special. Santa's reindeer also feature.); Santa Claus Is Comin' to Town (1970) (Note: Recurring characters include Santa (voiced by Mickey Rooney), Mrs. Jessica Claus (voiced by Robie Lester), and S.D. Kluger (voiced by Fred Astaire) in this special. Rudolph and Santa's other reindeer also feature.); Here Comes Peter Cottontail (1971) (Note: Recurring characters include the Easter Bunny (voiced by Casey Kasem), and Santa (voiced by Frees) in this special. Santa's reindeer also feature.); 'Twas the Night Before Christmas (1974) (Note: Recurring characters in this special include Santa (voiced by Allen Swift), alongside his featured reindeer.); The Year Without a Santa Claus (1974) (Note: Recurring characters include Santa (voiced by Rooney), Mrs. Claus (voiced by Shirley Booth), Snow Miser (voiced by Dick Shawn), Heat Miser (voiced by George S. Irving), and Mother Nature (voiced by Rhoda Mann) in this special. Rudolph and Santa's other reindeer also feature.); The First Easter Rabbit (1976) (Note: Recurring characters include Easter Bunny (voiced by Robert Morse and Burl Ives), and Santa (voiced by Frees) in this special. Santa's reindeer also feature.); Frosty's Winter Wonderland (1976) (Note: Recurring characters include Frosty (voiced by Vernon), Mrs. Crystal Frosty (voiced by Shelley Winters), and Jack Frost (voiced by Frees) in this special.); Rudolph's Shiny New Year (1976) (Note: Recurring characters include Rudolph (voiced by Richards) and Santa (voiced by Frees) in this special. Santa's other reindeer also feature.); The Easter Bunny Is Comin' to Town (1977) (Note: Recurring characters include Easter Bunny (voiced by Skip Hinnant), and S.D. Kluger (voiced by Astaire) in this special.); Nestor, the Long-Eared Christmas Donkey (1977) (Note: Recurring characters in this special include Santa (voiced by Frees), alongside Rudolph and his other featured reindeer.); The Stingiest Man in Town (1978) (Note: Recurring characters in this special include Santa Claus during a scene which compares the Ghost of Christmas Present to him (both characters were voiced by Frees).); Jack Frost (1979) (Note: The recurring character is Jack Frost (voiced by Robert Morse) in this special.); Rudolph and Frosty's Christmas in July (1979) (Note: Recurring characters include Rudolph (voiced by Richards), Frosty (voiced by Vernon), Santa (voiced by Rooney), Mrs. Claus (voiced by Darlene Conley), Crystal (voiced by Winters), and Jack Frost (voiced by Frees) in this special. Santa's other reindeer also feature.); Pinocchio's Christmas (1980) (Note: The recurring characters in the special include Santa (voiced by Swift), alongside his featured reindeer.); Frosty Returns (1992) (Note: The recurring character is Frosty (voiced by John Goodman) in this special. Mother Nature is also referenced in the short.); Rudolph the Red-Nosed Reindeer and the Island of Misfit Toys (2001) (Note: Recurring characters include Rudolph (voiced by Kathleen Barr), Santa (voiced by Garry Chalk), and Mrs. Claus (also voiced by Barr) in this film. Santa's other reindeer, and various other characters from the 1964 original also feature.); The Legend of Frosty the Snowman (2005) (Note: Recurring characters include Frosty (voiced by Bill Fagerbakke), and Professor Tinkerton (voiced by Kath Soucie) in this special.); A Miser Brothers' Christmas (2008) (Note: Recurring characters include Snow Miser (voiced by Juan Chioran), Heat Miser (voiced by Irving), Santa (voiced by Rooney), Mrs. Claus (voiced by Catherine Disher), and Mother Earth (voiced by Patricia Hamilton) in this special. Santa's reindeer also feature.)

The Legend of Frosty the Snowman is a 2005 Christmas animated television film produced by Classic Media (now DreamWorks Classics), Studio B Productions and Top Draw Animation. Based on Steve Nelson and Jack Rollins's 1950 Christmas song "Frosty the Snowman", the film is narrated by Burt Reynolds and features Bill Fagerbakke as the voice of Frosty the Snowman. It is the fifth (and last-to-date) television special to feature the Frosty the Snowman character.

== Plot ==
Frosty the Snowman arrives in the town of Evergreen, where children are unhappy due to strict rules set by Mayor Tinkerton. Frosty tries to engage Tinkerton's son, Tommy, but he is too afraid of his father's authority. Instead, Frosty plays with Tommy's friend, Walter Wader, who gains confidence. Walter engages in a food fight with Tommy's older brother, Charlie, resulting in both boys landing in detention. Walter's mention of "a magical snowman" makes Tinkerton uneasy, but Principal Hank Pankley assures him that Walter's story is untrue. After school, Charlie and Walter both play outside with Frosty.

Tommy follows Frosty's hat to the library and finds a comic about a boy who created Frosty with the help of his magician father's hat, but the rest of the comic's pages are blank. Tinkerton gives Tommy a "#1" pin and asks Tommy to report anything unusual. Tommy later discovers a picture of his father as a child and realizes that his father is the boy in the comic.

Frosty enjoys playing with children, but their misbehavior frustrates parents and causes Tinkerton's collapse. Pankley becomes mayor and tricks Walter into helping him trap Frosty, leading to Frosty falling into a pond and melting. Meanwhile, the blank pages in the comic restore themselves, and Tommy discovers that Pankley stole the hat and locked it away the same winter that Tinkerton created Frosty.

Tommy and his friends retrieve the hat and revive Frosty, prompting their worried parents to search for their children, despite Pankley's attempts to stop them. Tinkerton offers to help, only for Pankley to furiously rebuke him. Tommy returns the pin to Tinkerton, who forgives him and recognizes Frosty's magic. Pankley's plot and true colors are exposed in the process; Tinkerton immediately reinstates himself as mayor in disgust and Walter throws a snowball at Pankley, leading to a massive snowball fight. Pankley runs away from the action, only to fall into the pond. The adults and children reconcile, with Tinkerton's belief in magic restored and the rules and curfews removed from Evergreen. The film's narrator is revealed to be an elderly Tommy, who is married to his childhood love interest, Sara Simple.

== Cast ==
- Burt Reynolds as Narrator/Old Tommy Tinkerton
- Bill Fagerbakke as Frosty the Snowman
- Kath Soucie as Tommy Tinkerton, Old Sara Tinkerton (née Simple)
- Tom Kenny as Mr. Tinkerton
- Larry Miller as Principal Pankley
- Jeannie Elias as Charlie Tinkerton, Librarian
- Kenny Blank as Walter Wader
- Tara Strong as Sara Simple, Sonny Sklarew
- Grey DeLisle as Miss Sharpey, Simon Sklarew, Sullivan Sklarew
- Candi Milo as Mrs. Tinkerton, Girl #2
- David Jeremiah as Mr. Simple, Mr. Sklarew, Townsperson #1
- Tress MacNeille as Mrs. Simple, Girl #1
- Vernee Watson-Johnson as Mrs. Wader
- Evan Gore as Paperboy

== Background ==
The official cover artwork for the home video release of The Legend of Frosty the Snowman: Collection. The release included Frosty the Snowman (1969) and Frosty Returns (1992), acknowledging their connections though each release were produced by differing production studios.

The film holds only a loose continuity with Rankin/Bass's 1969 television special Frosty the Snowman although Frosty's design by Paul Coker, Jr. is identical and Tommy's grandfather is clearly Professor Hinkle, the reformed antagonist of the original special. Apart from a brief mention of Santa Claus, there is no direct reference to Christmas itself. The film was produced in late 2004, but like Rudolph's Shiny New Year, it was not released until a full year later.

The film originally aired annually on Cartoon Network from 2005 until December 11, 2011, when the special moved to Kids & Teens TV, which ceased operations in 2019. Following this, the special was acquired by AMC as part of their Best Christmas Ever event. Distribution rights to the film are currently held by NBCUniversal Television Distribution following its parent Comcast's acquisition of DreamWorks Animation, which acquired the film's holder Classic Media in 2012. DreamWorks released the special for free on YouTube on November 30, 2017, along with the original Frosty the Snowman, until it was withdrawn after the 2024 season. In 2025, the special moved to Freeform's 25 Days of Christmas.
