= Nestor, the Long-Eared Christmas Donkey =

1977 American-Japanese Christmas TV special

- Title page
- Based on: Nestor, the Long-Eared Christmas Donkey by Gene Autry; Don Pfrimmer; Dave Burgess
- Written by: Romeo Muller
- Directed by: Jules Bass; Arthur Rankin Jr.
- Starring: Brenda Vaccaro; Paul Frees
- Narrated by: Roger Miller
- Composers: Maury Laws; Jules Bass
- Countries of origin: United States; Japan
- Original language: English

Production
- Producers: Jules Bass; Arthur Rankin Jr.
- Cinematography: Akikazu Kono; Satoshi Fujino
- Running time: 24 minutes
- Production company: Rankin/Bass Productions

Original release
- Network: ABC
- Release: December 3, 1977

Related
- Rudolph the Red-Nosed Reindeer (1964) (Note: Recurring characters include Rudolph (voiced by Billie Mae Richards), Santa Claus (voiced by Stan Francis), and Mrs. Claus (voiced by Peg Dixon) in this special. Various actors portray the other reindeer.); Frosty the Snowman (1969) (Note: Recurring characters include Frosty the Snowman (voiced by Jackie Vernon), Santa (voiced by Paul Frees), and Professor Hinkle Tinkerton (voiced by Billy De Wolfe) in this special. Santa's reindeer also feature.); Santa Claus Is Comin' to Town (1970) (Note: Recurring characters include Santa (voiced by Mickey Rooney), Mrs. Jessica Claus (voiced by Robie Lester), and S.D. Kluger (voiced by Fred Astaire) in this special. Rudolph and Santa's other reindeer also feature.); Here Comes Peter Cottontail (1971) (Note: Recurring characters include the Easter Bunny (voiced by Casey Kasem), and Santa (voiced by Frees) in this special. Santa's reindeer also feature.); 'Twas the Night Before Christmas (1974) (Note: Recurring characters in this special include Santa (voiced by Allen Swift), alongside his featured reindeer.); The Year Without a Santa Claus (1974) (Note: Recurring characters include Santa (voiced by Rooney), Mrs. Claus (voiced by Shirley Booth), Snow Miser (voiced by Dick Shawn), Heat Miser (voiced by George S. Irving), and Mother Nature (voiced by Rhoda Mann) in this special. Rudolph and Santa's other reindeer also feature.); The First Easter Rabbit (1976) (Note: Recurring characters include Easter Bunny (voiced by Robert Morse and Burl Ives), and Santa (voiced by Frees) in this special. Santa's reindeer also feature.); Frosty's Winter Wonderland (1976) (Note: Recurring characters include Frosty (voiced by Vernon), Mrs. Crystal Frosty (voiced by Shelley Winters), and Jack Frost (voiced by Frees) in this special.); Rudolph's Shiny New Year (1976) (Note: Recurring characters include Rudolph (voiced by Richards) and Santa (voiced by Frees) in this special. Santa's other reindeer also feature.); The Easter Bunny Is Comin' to Town (1977) (Note: Recurring characters include Easter Bunny (voiced by Skip Hinnant), and S.D. Kluger (voiced by Astaire) in this special.); Nestor, the Long-Eared Christmas Donkey (1977) (Note: Recurring characters in this special include Santa (voiced by Frees), alongside Rudolph and his other featured reindeer.); The Stingiest Man in Town (1978) (Note: Recurring characters in this special include Santa Claus during a scene which compares the Ghost of Christmas Present to him (both characters were voiced by Frees).); Jack Frost (1979) (Note: The recurring character is Jack Frost (voiced by Robert Morse) in this special.); Rudolph and Frosty's Christmas in July (1979) (Note: Recurring characters include Rudolph (voiced by Richards), Frosty (voiced by Vernon), Santa (voiced by Rooney), Mrs. Claus (voiced by Darlene Conley), Crystal (voiced by Winters), and Jack Frost (voiced by Frees) in this special. Santa's other reindeer also feature.); Pinocchio's Christmas (1980) (Note: The recurring characters in the special include Santa (voiced by Swift), alongside his featured reindeer.); Frosty Returns (1992) (Note: The recurring character is Frosty (voiced by John Goodman) in this special. Mother Nature is also referenced in the short.); Rudolph the Red-Nosed Reindeer and the Island of Misfit Toys (2001) (Note: Recurring characters include Rudolph (voiced by Kathleen Barr), Santa (voiced by Garry Chalk), and Mrs. Claus (also voiced by Barr) in this film. Santa's other reindeer, and various other characters from the 1964 original also feature.); The Legend of Frosty the Snowman (2005) (Note: Recurring characters include Frosty (voiced by Bill Fagerbakke), and Professor Tinkerton (voiced by Kath Soucie) in this special.); A Miser Brothers' Christmas (2008) (Note: Recurring characters include Snow Miser (voiced by Juan Chioran), Heat Miser (voiced by Irving), Santa (voiced by Rooney), Mrs. Claus (voiced by Catherine Disher), and Mother Earth (voiced by Patricia Hamilton) in this special. Santa's reindeer also feature.)

Nestor, the Long-Eared Christmas Donkey is a 1977 Christmas animated television special produced by Rankin/Bass Productions. It premiered on ABC on December 3, 1977. The story is based on the 1975 song written by Gene Autry, Don Pfrimmer and Dave Burgess.

== Plot ==
Santa Claus's donkey Spieltoe details his duties at the North Pole and tours the stables in which his reindeer (including Rudolph) reside. Spieltoe also tells the story of Nestor, his ancestor who lived in a stable during the days of the Roman Empire.

Nestor is teased by other animals and mistreated by Olaf, the stable owner, for his unusually long ears. One night, when Roman soldiers come to the stable to buy donkeys, they dismiss Nestor as an imperfect misfit and leave him behind while taking all the other donkeys for free. Enraged, Olaf casts Nestor out into the frigid cold. Nestor's mother finds him and shields from the harsh weather with her own body, only to freeze to death as a result.

The next day, Nestor meets a cherub named Tilly, who says that they need to travel to Bethlehem. When they reach the outskirts of the town, Tilly returns to Heaven, instructing Nestor to wait. When Mary and Joseph are expecting Jesus, they take Nestor because of his "gentle eyes", but are caught in a sandstorm.

In the midst of the storm, Nestor hears Tilly's voice, but recognizes it as his mother's, and she tells him to follow the voices of the angels. Nestor guides Mary and Joseph through the storm while wrapping Mary in his ears to keep her warm. They arrive in Bethlehem to find the stable where Mary gives birth to Jesus. Nestor finds his way back to his home stable, where he is hailed as a hero by Olaf and the other animals.

Back in the present, Spieltoe, Santa, Mrs. Claus, Rudolph and his fellow reindeer, and the Christmas elves gather around the Christmas tree, which features a carving of Nestor. Tilly is briefly shown again as Nestor states "Merry Christmas".

== Cast ==
An original advertisement for the television special.

- Roger Miller as Spieltoe
- Erik Stern as Nestor
- Brenda Vaccaro as Tilly
- Paul Frees as:
  - Olaf the Stable Owner
  - A donkey dealer
  - Santa Claus
- Linda Gary as Nestor's Mother
- Iris Rainer and Shelly Hines as Nestor's friends
- Don Messick as a Roman soldier
- Taryn Davies as Mary
- Harry Maurice Rosner as Joseph

== Crew ==
- Produced and Directed by Arthur Rankin Jr. and Jules Bass
- Assistant Producer: Masaki Iizuka
- Written by Romeo Muller
- Based on the Song by Gene Autry, Don Pfrimmer and Dave Burgess
- Additional Music and Lyrics by Maury Laws and Jules Bass
- Design by Paul Coker, Jr.
- "Animagic" Supervisors: Akikazu Kono and Satoshi Fujino
- Sound Recorders: John Curcio and Joe Jorgensen
- Music Arranged and Conducted by Maury Laws

== Production ==
In addition to Akikazu Kono, this is Rankin/Bass' second and last "Animagic" stop motion puppet production to be supervised by another Japanese animator, Satoshi Fujino, who also previously worked on The Little Drummer Boy, Book II.

== Home video ==
The special was released in 2000 with The Year Without a Santa Claus. It was later included in The Complete Rankin/Bass Christmas Collection DVD in 2022 and Blu-ray in 2023.

== See also ==
- List of Christmas films
- List of Rankin/Bass Productions films
