= 'Twas the Night Before Christmas (1974 TV special) =

1974 American-Japanese animated Christmas television special

- Title page
- Genre: Animation
- Written by: Jerome Coopersmith
- Directed by: Arthur Rankin Jr. Jules Bass
- Starring: Joel Grey; George Gobel; Tammy Grimes; John McGiver
- Narrated by: George Gobel (main story); Joel Grey (poem sequence)
- Theme music composer: Maury Laws
- Countries of origin: United States; Japan
- Original language: English

Production
- Producers: Arthur Rankin Jr. Jules Bass
- Cinematography: Toru Hara; Tsuguyuki Kubo
- Running time: 25 minutes
- Production companies: Rankin/Bass Productions; Topcraft Limited Company

Original release
- Network: CBS
- Release: December 8, 1974

Related
- Rudolph the Red-Nosed Reindeer (1964) (Note: Recurring characters include Rudolph (voiced by Billie Mae Richards), Santa Claus (voiced by Stan Francis), and Mrs. Claus (voiced by Peg Dixon) in this special. Various actors portray the other reindeer.); Frosty the Snowman (1969) (Note: Recurring characters include Frosty the Snowman (voiced by Jackie Vernon), Santa (voiced by Paul Frees), and Professor Hinkle Tinkerton (voiced by Billy De Wolfe) in this special. Santa's reindeer also feature.); Santa Claus Is Comin' to Town (1970) (Note: Recurring characters include Santa (voiced by Mickey Rooney), Mrs. Jessica Claus (voiced by Robie Lester), and S.D. Kluger (voiced by Fred Astaire) in this special. Rudolph and Santa's other reindeer also feature.); Here Comes Peter Cottontail (1971) (Note: Recurring characters include the Easter Bunny (voiced by Casey Kasem), and Santa (voiced by Frees) in this special. Santa's reindeer also feature.); 'Twas the Night Before Christmas (1974) (Note: Recurring characters in this special include Santa (voiced by Allen Swift), alongside his featured reindeer.); The Year Without a Santa Claus (1974) (Note: Recurring characters include Santa (voiced by Rooney), Mrs. Claus (voiced by Shirley Booth), Snow Miser (voiced by Dick Shawn), Heat Miser (voiced by George S. Irving), and Mother Nature (voiced by Rhoda Mann) in this special. Rudolph and Santa's other reindeer also feature.); The First Easter Rabbit (1976) (Note: Recurring characters include Easter Bunny (voiced by Robert Morse and Burl Ives), and Santa (voiced by Frees) in this special. Santa's reindeer also feature.); Frosty's Winter Wonderland (1976) (Note: Recurring characters include Frosty (voiced by Vernon), Mrs. Crystal Frosty (voiced by Shelley Winters), and Jack Frost (voiced by Frees) in this special.); Rudolph's Shiny New Year (1976) (Note: Recurring characters include Rudolph (voiced by Richards) and Santa (voiced by Frees) in this special. Santa's other reindeer also feature.); The Easter Bunny Is Comin' to Town (1977) (Note: Recurring characters include Easter Bunny (voiced by Skip Hinnant), and S.D. Kluger (voiced by Astaire) in this special.); Nestor, the Long-Eared Christmas Donkey (1977) (Note: Recurring characters in this special include Santa (voiced by Frees), alongside Rudolph and his other featured reindeer.); The Stingiest Man in Town (1978) (Note: Recurring characters in this special include Santa Claus during a scene which compares the Ghost of Christmas Present to him (both characters were voiced by Frees).); Jack Frost (1979) (Note: The recurring character is Jack Frost (voiced by Robert Morse) in this special.); Rudolph and Frosty's Christmas in July (1979) (Note: Recurring characters include Rudolph (voiced by Richards), Frosty (voiced by Vernon), Santa (voiced by Rooney), Mrs. Claus (voiced by Darlene Conley), Crystal (voiced by Winters), and Jack Frost (voiced by Frees) in this special. Santa's other reindeer also feature.); Pinocchio's Christmas (1980) (Note: The recurring characters in the special include Santa (voiced by Swift), alongside his featured reindeer.); Frosty Returns (1992) (Note: The recurring character is Frosty (voiced by John Goodman) in this special. Mother Nature is also referenced in the short.); Rudolph the Red-Nosed Reindeer and the Island of Misfit Toys (2001) (Note: Recurring characters include Rudolph (voiced by Kathleen Barr), Santa (voiced by Garry Chalk), and Mrs. Claus (also voiced by Barr) in this film. Santa's other reindeer, and various other characters from the 1964 original also feature.); The Legend of Frosty the Snowman (2005) (Note: Recurring characters include Frosty (voiced by Bill Fagerbakke), and Professor Tinkerton (voiced by Kath Soucie) in this special.); A Miser Brothers' Christmas (2008) (Note: Recurring characters include Snow Miser (voiced by Juan Chioran), Heat Miser (voiced by Irving), Santa (voiced by Rooney), Mrs. Claus (voiced by Catherine Disher), and Mother Earth (voiced by Patricia Hamilton) in this special. Santa's reindeer also feature.)

'Twas the Night Before Christmas is a 1974 American animated Christmas television special produced by Rankin/Bass Productions that features Clement Clarke Moore's famous 1823 poem A Visit from St. Nicholas, the opening line of which is the source of the title of this animated special. The special first originally aired on CBS on December 8, 1974, and the network aired it annually until 1994, when The Family Channel (now Freeform) took over its syndication rights. AMC took over syndication rights for the special in 2018.

Although the opening credits mention "told and sung by Joel Grey", it is really narrated by George Gobel, as there is more emphasis on the point of view of Father Mouse, with Moore's poem read by Grey as a secondary plot.

== Plot ==
Santa Claus is offended by an anonymous letter printed in a Junctionville, USA newspaper claiming that he does not exist. In response, Santa returns all of the townspeople's letters unopened. Upon reading the letter, Father Mouse, an assistant to the clockmaker Joshua Trundle, suspects that his son Albert is the author, and Albert confirms this. To make amends with Santa, Father Mouse and the Trundle Family build a clock tower that will play a special song to convince Santa not to bypass Junctionville on Christmas Eve.

Unfortunately, Albert sneaks into the clock and inadvertently causes it to malfunction in front of the whole town. The Mayor, embarrassed by the clock's failure, denies Joshua access for repairs. After confessing his mistake, Albert decides to fix the clock himself and manages to get it to play its song within earshot of Santa, prompting Santa to visit the town after all.

== Cast ==
- George Gobel as Father Mouse
- Joel Grey as Joshua Trundle
- Tammy Grimes as Albert
- John McGiver as The Mayor of Junctionville

=== Additional voices ===
- Robert McFadden as The Substation Operator, The Councilmen, and The Handyman
- Allen Swift as Santa Claus
- Pat Bright as Sarah Trundle, and Mother Mouse
- Christine Winter as The Girl, and The Girl Mouse
- Scott Firestone as The Boy, and The Boy Mouse
- The Wee Winter Singers as The Chorus

== Songs ==
There are three musical numbers in the program:

1. "Give Your Heart a Try" - Father Mouse (George Gobel)
2. "Even a Miracle Needs a Hand" - Joshua Trundle (Joel Grey), Albert (Tammy Grimes)
3. "Christmas Chimes are Calling (Santa, Santa)" - Chorus

== In popular culture ==
"Even a Miracle Needs a Hand" later appeared on South Park in the Season 4 episode "A Very Crappy Christmas". Similar to its use in the original special, the song is sung by Kyle to Stan and Kenny during a seemingly hopeless situation. At one point, Joshua Trundle's face is even superimposed over Kyle's face.

== Production ==
An original advertisement for the special.

Like many of Rankin/Bass' other animated TV specials, this special was animated in Japan by the animation studio Topcraft, which was rolled into Studio Ghibli in 1985.

== Home media ==
The special was originally first issued on VHS by ABC Video Enterprises and Golden Book Video in 1987. After Lorimar was purchased by Time Warner, Warner Home Video/Warner Bros. Family Entertainment (owners of the post-1974 Rankin/Bass library), re-released the special on VHS in 1990, and on DVD in 2004, paired with the 1976 special Frosty's Winter Wonderland. A Blu-ray was released on October 5, 2011. It is also available on iTunes for purchase. On October 31, 2023, it was released as part of The Complete Rankin/Bass Christmas Collection on blu-ray and DVD.

== See also ==
- List of Christmas films
