= The Easter Bunny Is Comin' to Town =

1977 Easter TV special

- Title page
- Written by: Romeo Muller
- Directed by: Arthur Rankin Jr. Jules Bass
- Starring: Skip Hinnant; Bob McFadden; Meg Sargent; James Spies; Allen Swift
- Narrated by: Fred Astaire
- Theme music composer: Maury Laws
- Countries of origin: United States; Japan
- Original language: English

Production
- Producers: Arthur Rankin Jr. Jules Bass
- Cinematography: Akikazu Kono
- Running time: 50 minutes
- Production company: Rankin/Bass Productions

Original release
- Network: ABC
- Release: April 6, 1977

Related
- Frosty the Snowman (1969) (Note: Recurring characters include Frosty the Snowman (voiced by Jackie Vernon), Santa (voiced by Paul Frees), and Professor Hinkle Tinkerton (voiced by Billy De Wolfe) in this special. Santa's reindeer also feature.); Santa Claus Is Comin' to Town (1970) (Note: Recurring characters include Santa (voiced by Mickey Rooney), Mrs. Jessica Claus (voiced by Robie Lester), and S.D. Kluger (voiced by Fred Astaire) in this special. Rudolph and Santa's other reindeer also feature.); Here Comes Peter Cottontail (1971) (Note: Recurring characters include the Easter Bunny (voiced by Casey Kasem), and Santa (voiced by Frees) in this special. Santa's reindeer also feature.); 'Twas the Night Before Christmas (1974) (Note: Recurring characters in this special include Santa (voiced by Allen Swift), alongside his featured reindeer.); The Year Without a Santa Claus (1974) (Note: Recurring characters include Santa (voiced by Rooney), Mrs. Claus (voiced by Shirley Booth), Snow Miser (voiced by Dick Shawn), Heat Miser (voiced by George S. Irving), and Mother Nature (voiced by Rhoda Mann) in this special. Rudolph and Santa's other reindeer also feature.); The First Easter Rabbit (1976) (Note: Recurring characters include Easter Bunny (voiced by Robert Morse and Burl Ives), and Santa (voiced by Frees) in this special. Santa's reindeer also feature.); Frosty's Winter Wonderland (1976) (Note: Recurring characters include Frosty (voiced by Vernon), Mrs. Crystal Frosty (voiced by Shelley Winters), and Jack Frost (voiced by Frees) in this special.); Rudolph's Shiny New Year (1976) (Note: Recurring characters include Rudolph (voiced by Richards) and Santa (voiced by Frees) in this special. Santa's other reindeer also feature.); The Easter Bunny Is Comin' to Town (1977) (Note: Recurring characters include Easter Bunny (voiced by Skip Hinnant), and S.D. Kluger (voiced by Astaire) in this special.); Nestor, the Long-Eared Christmas Donkey (1977) (Note: Recurring characters in this special include Santa (voiced by Frees), alongside Rudolph and his other featured reindeer.); The Stingiest Man in Town (1978) (Note: Recurring characters in this special include Santa Claus during a scene which compares the Ghost of Christmas Present to him (both characters were voiced by Frees).); Jack Frost (1979) (Note: The recurring character is Jack Frost (voiced by Robert Morse) in this special.); Rudolph and Frosty's Christmas in July (1979) (Note: Recurring characters include Rudolph (voiced by Richards), Frosty (voiced by Vernon), Santa (voiced by Rooney), Mrs. Claus (voiced by Darlene Conley), Crystal (voiced by Winters), and Jack Frost (voiced by Frees) in this special. Santa's other reindeer also feature.); Pinocchio's Christmas (1980) (Note: The recurring characters in the special include Santa (voiced by Swift), alongside his featured reindeer.); Frosty Returns (1992) (Note: The recurring character is Frosty (voiced by John Goodman) in this special. Mother Nature is also referenced in the short.); Rudolph the Red-Nosed Reindeer and the Island of Misfit Toys (2001) (Note: Recurring characters include Rudolph (voiced by Kathleen Barr), Santa (voiced by Garry Chalk), and Mrs. Claus (also voiced by Barr) in this film. Santa's other reindeer, and various other feature.); The Legend of Frosty the Snowman (2005) (Note: Recurring characters include Frosty (voiced by Bill Fagerbakke), and Professor Tinkerton (voiced by Kath Soucie) in this special.); A Miser Brothers' Christmas (2008) (Note: Recurring characters include Snow Miser (voiced by Juan Chioran), Heat Miser (voiced by Irving), Santa (voiced by Rooney), Mrs. Claus (voiced by Catherine Disher), and Mother Earth (voiced by Patricia Hamilton) in this special. Santa's reindeer also feature.)

The Easter Bunny Is Comin' to Town is a 1977 American-Japanese musical Easter television special produced by Rankin/Bass Productions, using their "Animagic" stop motion animation. The special reunites the writer Romeo Muller, designer Paul Coker Jr., and narrator Fred Astaire from Santa Claus Is Comin' to Town, and stars the voices of Skip Hinnant, Bob McFadden, Meg Sargent, James Spies and Allen Swift. It premiered on ABC in the United States on April 6, 1977.

The special includes original songs including two sung by Astaire: "The Easter Bunny Is Comin' to Town" and "All You Have to Do is Think 'Can Do'".

== Plot ==
S.D. Kluger, still a mailman, returns as a train engineer to answer children’s questions about the Easter Bunny and other Easter traditions.

The story begins in the small town of Kidville, a community comprising orphaned children (including Kluger when he was a child) at the foot of Big Rock Mountain. The children enjoy the simple life despite being bothered by Gadzooks, an ill-tempered bear who hates everything to do with the holidays including birthdays. One Easter morning, the children find an orphaned baby rabbit, raise him as their own, and name him Sunny when they notice how much he likes the warm Easter morning sun. Now one year old, Sunny makes plans with the children to sell what they make in exchange for what they need, including their eggs, with help from three chickens called the Hendrews Sisters.

Sunny sets off to deliver his eggs. Along the way, he meets a wise, jolly hobo named Hallelujah Jones, who suggests to him that he could sell his eggs in a town that's just called Town. However, upon climbing Big Rock Mountain, Sunny runs into Gadzooks who steals his eggs. After escaping, Sunny makes it to Town which is a dreary, dismal place. There, nobody laughs, everyone dresses in dark clothing, and if any children are born, the whole family has to move away, and beans are eaten for every meal by order of the ruthless Dowager Duchess Lily Longtooth who wants her seven-year-old nephew King Bruce the Frail to follow in her footsteps. Bruce complains about always having to eat beans and wanting to be a normal child instead of being a king, despite his aunt's objections.

Saddened by this, Sunny heads back to Kidville and explains the problem. Hallelujah and the children dip the eggs in various bowls of paint as a way of tricking Gadzooks. He lies to the bear, saying that he is on his way to sell colored stones as paperweights. Befuddled by Sunny's lie, Gadzooks lets him go, demanding he bring him eggs.

Sunny makes it into Town again, passing out his eggs to all the townspeople, including King Bruce who crowns him the Easter Bunny, Royal Knight of the Rainbow Eggs. He and Sunny initiate a traditional ritual of eating the eggs. Disappointed in her nephew, Lily chases Sunny out, outlaws eggs, and sends him to bed without supper. After Bruce tells Sunny (who apologizes for getting Bruce punished about the eggs) that he knew his supper would be more beans, Sunny promises to bring him very special beans next Easter.

The following year, Sunny, Hallelujah, and Herbert the Baker make the first Easter jelly beans. However, upon their way to Town to deliver them, Gadzooks, still angered by Sunny's lie and thinking his eggs are colored stones again, throws them far away. All hope seems lost until all the other children hunt the eggs up in bushes and trees and Sunny decides that he will always hide them.

Next Easter, Sunny sets out, only to get caught by Gadzooks who chases him to Kidville, where everybody has pitched in to make him a new Easter outfit made by the Kidville tailors. Touched by their gesture of kindness, Gadzooks becomes their friend. Meanwhile, back in Town, the townspeople become interested in the Easter eggs that Sunny hid, King Bruce and his servants enjoy eating the jelly beans, and the children are loved by the townspeople. But an outraged Lily sends her guards out to arrest them. Sunny and the children leave just in time, and promise to return next year.

Next Easter, Sunny has the candy maker come up with a secret weapon of his own for their next visit. Hallelujah suggests that Sunny should do something for Bruce so he can stand up to Lily, which Sunny agrees to and goes to the Kidville seamstress and pillow makers for this idea. On their next visit to Town, after causing the guards to trip on the rolling Easter eggs, Sunny hops into a paper bag, where the guards discover that they captured a chocolate bunny, thus being let into Town where Sunny brings Bruce stuffed animals to give him courage every night when he is lonely. Just as Bruce is about to give Sunny permission to come to Town whenever he wants, Lily arrives to stop him. Bruce tells her that he outranks her, but finds it difficult. Afterwards, Lily tells her guards to do anything they can to stop Sunny from coming to Town.

The following year, Sunny and friends plan to have Gadzooks help them bring all the Easter treats to Town. However, Lily's guards cause the bear to trip and break his big toe. Everyone is saddened that injured Gadzooks cannot help, but Hallelujah suggests that they build a railroad over Big Rock Mountain from Kidville to Town. After the railroad is built, Sunny and his friends go to the train yard to hire a locomotive to carry all the goods. However, since the engines in the roundhouse are too important to help, they hire a rusty but kind engine named Chugs and give him a makeover, painting him yellow.

Meanwhile, Lily orders her guards to stop the train from getting to Town. They spread melted butter on the rails, causing Chugs' wheels to slip, but Hallelujah pours jelly beans on the butter and provides extra traction to allow them to climb the hill, thus foiling Lily's plan. Soon after, they all make it to Town where everyone happily celebrates, except for Lily, who thinks Bruce will banish her forever. However, he and Sunny give her an Easter flower named after her called a lily. Afterwards, everyone, including S.D. Kluger, celebrates with a train ride on Chugs.

== Cast ==
- Fred Astaire – S.D. Kluger
- Skip Hinnant – Sunny
- Bob McFadden – Chugs, Old Man
- Meg Sargent – Dowager Duchess Lily Longtooth
- James Spies – King Bruce the Frail
- Allen Swift – Gadzooks the Bear, Newsreel announcer, Blue engine, Red engine, Town guard
- Gia Anderson – Child
- George Brennan – Child
- Stacy Carey – Child
- Laura Dean – Child
- Jill Choder – Chicken #1, Chicken #2
- Karen Dahle – Linda the Teacher, Chicken #3
- Ron Marshall – Hallelujah H. Jones, Green engine, Brown engine, Town guard
- Michael McGovern – Herbert the Baker

== Crew ==
- Producers/directors – Arthur Rankin Jr., Jules Bass
- Associate producer – Masaki Iizuka
- Writer – Romeo Muller
- Music/lyrics – Maury Laws, Jules Bass
- Design – Paul Coker Jr.
- Animagic supervisor – Akikazu Kono
- Sound recorders – John Curcio, Dave Iveland
- Sound effects – Tom Clark
- Music arranger/conductor – Bernard Hoffer

== Songs ==
The original advertisement for the television special

- The Easter Bunny Is Comin' to Town - Fred Astaire
- Which Came First, the Chicken or the Egg? - The Hendrews Sisters
- Someone's Gotta Be First - Skip Hinnant
- You Think Nobody Loves You, But They Do - Ron Marshall and the Hendrews Sisters
- The Big Rock Candy Mountain - Ron Marshall
- Train-Yard Blues - Bob McFadden and the Hendrews Sisters
- All You Have to Do is Think "Can Do" - Fred Astaire and the Cast

== Production details ==
- The Easter Bunny Is Comin' to Town was the last Rankin/Bass television special for Fred Astaire, who also played narrator S.D. Kluger in the previous holiday special, Santa Claus is Comin' to Town (1970). It is also a semi-sequel to the earlier special — Santa Claus is only mentioned once in the special and as such, it shares many similarities with the earlier special (Sunny as Kris Kringle, the Kidville kids as the Kringles, King Bruce as Jessica, Hallelujah Jones as Topper the Penguin, Gadzooks as the Winter Warlock, and Lily Longtooth as Burgermeister Meisterburger). This Easter TV special was also Astaire's second time starring in a production about the holiday, following the 1948 MGM musical Easter Parade.
- This was the third and final Rankin/Bass special about Easter. The first two were Here Comes Peter Cottontail (1971), narrated by Danny Kaye, and The First Easter Rabbit (1976), narrated by Burl Ives.
- The original airing of The Easter Bunny Is Comin' to Town on ABC in 1977 ranked No. 13 in the Nielsen TV ratings for that week.
- Warner Home Video released The Easter Bunny Is Comin' to Town on VHS in 1993 and 2000 (as part of Warner's Century 2000 promotion), and on DVD in 2006 and 2008 (in a Deluxe Edition). The 2008 Deluxe Edition DVD release included two bonus features: "The Easter Bunny is Comin’ to Town: The Magic of Stop Motion." and three family-friendly selections consisting of "Breakfast of Magicians", "Floating Through Daydream Garden", and "The Easter Express".

== See also ==
- List of Easter television episodes
