= Jack Frost (TV special) =

1979 Christmas television special by Jules Bass

- Title page
- Written by: Romeo Muller
- Directed by: Jules Bass; Arthur Rankin Jr.
- Voices of: Buddy Hackett; Robert Morse; Debra Clinger; Paul Frees
- Narrated by: Buddy Hackett
- Theme music composer: Maury Laws
- Countries of origin: United States; Japan
- Original language: English

Production
- Producers: Jules Bass; Arthur Rankin Jr.
- Cinematography: Akikazu Kono; Ichiro Komuro; Hiroshi Tabata; Seiichi Araki
- Running time: 48 minutes
- Production company: Rankin/Bass Productions

Original release
- Network: NBC
- Release: December 13, 1979

Related
- Rudolph the Red-Nosed Reindeer (1964) (Note: Recurring characters include Rudolph (voiced by Billie Mae Richards), Santa Claus (voiced by Stan Francis), and Mrs. Claus (voiced by Peg Dixon) in this special. Various actors portray the other reindeer.); Frosty the Snowman (1969) (Note: Recurring characters include Frosty the Snowman (voiced by Jackie Vernon), Santa (voiced by Paul Frees), and Professor Hinkle Tinkerton (voiced by Billy De Wolfe) in this special. Santa's reindeer also feature.); Santa Claus Is Comin' to Town (1970) (Note: Recurring characters include Santa (voiced by Mickey Rooney), Mrs. Jessica Claus (voiced by Robie Lester), and S.D. Kluger (voiced by Fred Astaire) in this special. Rudolph and Santa's other reindeer also feature.); Here Comes Peter Cottontail (1971) (Note: Recurring characters include the Easter Bunny (voiced by Casey Kasem), and Santa (voiced by Frees) in this special. Santa's reindeer also feature.); 'Twas the Night Before Christmas (1974) (Note: Recurring characters in this special include Santa (voiced by Allen Swift), alongside his featured reindeer.); The Year Without a Santa Claus (1974) (Note: Recurring characters include Santa (voiced by Rooney), Mrs. Claus (voiced by Shirley Booth), Snow Miser (voiced by Dick Shawn), Heat Miser (voiced by George S. Irving), and Mother Nature (voiced by Rhoda Mann) in this special. Rudolph and Santa's other reindeer also feature.); The First Easter Rabbit (1976) (Note: Recurring characters include Easter Bunny (voiced by Robert Morse and Burl Ives), and Santa (voiced by Frees) in this special. Santa's reindeer also feature.); Frosty's Winter Wonderland (1976) (Note: Recurring characters include Frosty (voiced by Vernon), Mrs. Crystal Frosty (voiced by Shelley Winters), and Jack Frost (voiced by Frees) in this special.); Rudolph's Shiny New Year (1976) (Note: Recurring characters include Rudolph (voiced by Richards) and Santa (voiced by Frees) in this special. Santa's other reindeer also feature.); The Easter Bunny Is Comin' to Town (1977) (Note: Recurring characters include Easter Bunny (voiced by Skip Hinnant), and S.D. Kluger (voiced by Astaire) in this special.); Nestor, the Long-Eared Christmas Donkey (1977) (Note: Recurring characters in this special include Santa (voiced by Frees), alongside Rudolph and his other featured reindeer.); The Stingiest Man in Town (1978) (Note: Recurring characters in this special include Santa Claus during a scene which compares the Ghost of Christmas Present to him (both characters were voiced by Frees).); Jack Frost (1979) (Note: The recurring character is Jack Frost (voiced by Robert Morse) in this special.); Rudolph and Frosty's Christmas in July (1979) (Note: Recurring characters include Rudolph (voiced by Richards), Frosty (voiced by Vernon), Santa (voiced by Rooney), Mrs. Claus (voiced by Darlene Conley), Crystal (voiced by Winters), and Jack Frost (voiced by Frees) in this special. Santa's other reindeer also feature.); Pinocchio's Christmas (1980) (Note: The recurring characters in the special include Santa (voiced by Swift), alongside his featured reindeer.); Frosty Returns (1992) (Note: The recurring character is Frosty (voiced by John Goodman) in this special. Mother Nature is also referenced in the short.); Rudolph the Red-Nosed Reindeer and the Island of Misfit Toys (2001) (Note: Recurring characters include Rudolph (voiced by Kathleen Barr), Santa (voiced by Garry Chalk), and Mrs. Claus (also voiced by Barr) in this film. Santa's other reindeer, and various other characters from the 1964 original also feature.); The Legend of Frosty the Snowman (2005) (Note: Recurring characters include Frosty (voiced by Bill Fagerbakke), and Professor Tinkerton (voiced by Kath Soucie) in this special.); A Miser Brothers' Christmas (2008) (Note: Recurring characters include Snow Miser (voiced by Juan Chioran), Heat Miser (voiced by Irving), Santa (voiced by Rooney), Mrs. Claus (voiced by Catherine Disher), and Mother Earth (voiced by Patricia Hamilton) in this special. Santa's reindeer also feature.)

Jack Frost is a 1979 stop motion animated television special produced by Rankin/Bass Productions. It is directed by Jules Bass and Arthur Rankin Jr., written by Romeo Muller, narrated by Buddy Hackett, and starring the voices of Robert Morse, Debra Clinger and Paul Frees. The special premiered on NBC on December 13, 1979, and tells the tale of Jack Frost and his adventures as a human. It airs annually on AMC as part of its Best Christmas Ever programming block.

== Plot ==
The story is narrated by a groundhog named Pardon-Me-Pete who has a deal with Jack Frost to extend winter by 6 weeks, letting him sleep that much longer. Pete starts to talk about the legend of Jack Frost.

It all starts when Jack Frost, an immortal winter sprite, falls in love with a human girl named Elisa, who proclaims her love for Jack after he rescues her when Kubla Kraus, an evil Cossack king, cracks the ice she is standing on.

Jack asks Father Winter if he can become human in order to be with her. Father Winter gives him a chance but warns that Jack must prove he can succeed as a human, by earning a house, a horse, a bag of gold, and a wife by the first sign of spring. Jack agrees and turns human, assuming the identity of Jack Snip. He runs a tailor shop in the town of January Junction with two friends who also turned human, Snip the snowflake maker and Holly the snow gypsy, the latter two having been sent by Father Winter to ensure Jack does not get into trouble.

Elisa is charmed by "Jack Snip", but she harbors romantic dreams of Sir Ravenal Rightfellow, a "knight in golden armor". Around this time Jack is informed that Kubla Kraus lives alone in his castle on Miserable Mountain with his iron horse Klangstomper, his clockwork butler Fetch-Kvetch, his army of Keh-Nights, and a ventriloquist's dummy named Dommy as his sidekick, all made of iron since no human or animal could stand to live with him due to his arrogance and greed. Kraus also possesses all the brick, gold, and timber that January Junction used to have.

Elisa is soon kidnapped by Kraus and taken to his castle. After Elisa is rescued by Sir Ravenal, Kraus vows to destroy January Junction by sending one-thousand Keh-Nights in an attempt to recapture his bride and throws Jack, Snip, and Holly in the dungeon.

Jack gives up his humanity in order to whip up the biggest blizzard ever, freezing Kraus and his 1,000 Keh-Nights in the castle. Snip and Holly change back to sprites as well. This tactic works until Groundhog Day arrives. As the sky is overcast with no sun to cast shadows, Jack Frost uses his magic shadow to scare Pete back into hibernation, and continues whipping up the storm.

Finally with only 1 hour left before the arrival of spring, Jack returns to human form to stop Kraus by tricking his Keh-Nights into walking off the icy mountain to their destruction by imitating Dommy. Afterward, Jack causes Kraus to fall out of his castle and Father Winter literally blows him far away from Miserable Mountain, leaving Jack to claim the gold for himself as he makes Klangstomper his horse and claims the castle.

He races off to ask Elisa's parents for her hand in marriage. During his absence, she has fallen in love with Sir Ravenal and he with her. Jack becomes a sprite again for good and blows ice onto Elisa's wedding bouquet, turning it white. When asked about the change, she sheds a tear saying "An old friend just kissed the bride." Snip calls out to Jack that winter wouldn't be the same without him.

Before heading back to sleep, Pete says that Jack Frost still plays his tricks on him to ensure that there are 6 more weeks of winter, but he doesn't mind because he enjoys the extra sleep.

== Voice cast ==
One of the original advertisements for the television special.

- Robert Morse as Jack Frost
- Buddy Hackett as Pardon-Me-Pete
- Debra Clinger as Elisa
- Paul Frees as Father Winter, Kubla Kraus
- Dave Garroway as Groundhog Day Reporter
- Dina Lynn as Holly
- Sonny Melendrez as Sir Ravenal Rightfellow
- Don Messick as Snip
- Larry Storch as Papa
- Dee Stratton as Mama

== Crew ==
- Produced and Directed by Arthur Rankin, Jr. and Jules Bass
- Written by Romeo Muller
- Music and Lyrics by Maury Laws and Jules Bass
- Design: Paul Coker, Jr.
- Associate Producer: Masaki Iizuka
- "Animagic" Production Supervisors: Akikazu Kono, Ichiro Komuro, Hiroshi Tabata, Seiichi Araki
- Sound Recording: John Curcio, Dave Iveland, Glenn Berger, Robert Elder
- Sound Effects: Tom Clack
- Music Arranged and Conducted by Maury Laws

© 1979 Rankin/Bass Productions, Inc.

== Home media ==
The licensing for Jack Frost was relatively lax for many years and as early as the early 1990s, independent discount home video distributors produced VHS (and later DVD) copies from 16 mm prints. The special did not, as occasionally stated, lapse into the public domain; the Copyright Act of 1976 had taken effect by the time the special was published, which granted Rankin/Bass and its successors automatic copyrights of 75 years, and the program had a valid copyright notice to begin with.

In the fall of 2008, Warner Bros. via Warner Home Video (owners of the post-September 1974 Rankin/Bass library) re-released the special as an "official version" on DVD, using a digitally remastered 35 mm print as the master.

== Songs ==
- "Jack Frost Is Here" – Sung by Pardon-Me-Pete (Buddy Hackett) as the opening theme.

- "The Happiness of Being Me" / "It's Lonely Being One of a Kind" – Sung by Jack Frost (Robert Morse) yearning to be an ordinary human.

- "I'm Kubla Kraus!" – Sung by the villainous Kubla Kraus (Paul Frees).

- "I Will Woo Her & Win Her" – Performed as Kubla Kraus tries to win Elisa's affection.

- "Just What I Always Wanted" – Sung by the mechanical/royal subjects or characters in celebration.

- "I've Got a Day Named After Me (February 2)" – Groundhog Day-themed musical sequence.

- "Me and My Shadow" – Traditional composition with lyrics by Billy Rose.

- "The Christmas Song" – Written by Mel Tormé and Robert Wells.

== Reception ==
Writer John Witiw of MovieWeb noted the story's similarities with The Little Mermaid and praised Jack as the special's hero, noting he "retains viewers' sympathy as he fights for his impossible wish."

== See also ==
- List of Rankin/Bass Productions films
