= The First Easter Rabbit =

1976 Easter television special

- Title card
- Based on: The Velveteen Rabbit by Margery Williams
- Written by: Julian P. Gardner
- Directed by: Arthur Rankin, Jr. Jules Bass
- Starring: Robert Morse; Stan Freberg; Paul Frees; Joan Gardner; Dina Lyn; Don Messick
- Narrated by: Burl Ives
- Theme music composer: Maury Laws
- Country of origin: United States
- Original language: English

Production
- Producers: Arthur Rankin, Jr. Jules Bass
- Cinematography: Toru Hara; Tsuguyuki Kubo
- Editor: Irwin Goldress
- Running time: 25 minutes
- Production company: Rankin/Bass Productions

Original release
- Network: NBC
- Release: April 9, 1976

Related
- Rudolph the Red-Nosed Reindeer (1964) (Note: Recurring characters include Rudolph (voiced by Billie Mae Richards), Santa Claus (voiced by Stan Francis), and Mrs. Claus (voiced by Peg Dixon) in this special. Various actors portray the other reindeer.); Frosty the Snowman (1969) (Note: Recurring characters include Frosty the Snowman (voiced by Jackie Vernon), Santa (voiced by Paul Frees), and Professor Hinkle Tinkerton (voiced by Billy De Wolfe) in this special. Santa's reindeer also feature.); Santa Claus Is Comin' to Town (1970) (Note: Recurring characters include Santa (voiced by Mickey Rooney), Mrs. Jessica Claus (voiced by Robie Lester), and S.D. Kluger (voiced by Fred Astaire) in this special. Rudolph and Santa's other reindeer also feature.); Here Comes Peter Cottontail (1971) (Note: Recurring characters include the Easter Bunny (voiced by Casey Kasem), and Santa (voiced by Frees) in this special. Santa's reindeer also feature.); 'Twas the Night Before Christmas (1974) (Note: Recurring characters in this special include Santa (voiced by Allen Swift), alongside his featured reindeer.); The Year Without a Santa Claus (1974) (Note: Recurring characters include Santa (voiced by Rooney), Mrs. Claus (voiced by Shirley Booth), Snow Miser (voiced by Dick Shawn), Heat Miser (voiced by George S. Irving), and Mother Nature (voiced by Rhoda Mann) in this special. Rudolph and Santa's other reindeer also feature.); The First Easter Rabbit (1976) (Note: Recurring characters include Easter Bunny (voiced by Robert Morse and Burl Ives), and Santa (voiced by Frees) in this special. Santa's reindeer also feature.); Frosty's Winter Wonderland (1976) (Note: Recurring characters include Frosty (voiced by Vernon), Mrs. Crystal Frosty (voiced by Shelley Winters), and Jack Frost (voiced by Frees) in this special.); Rudolph's Shiny New Year (1976) (Note: Recurring characters include Rudolph (voiced by Richards) and Santa (voiced by Frees) in this special. Santa's other reindeer also feature.); The Easter Bunny Is Comin' to Town (1977) (Note: Recurring characters include Easter Bunny (voiced by Skip Hinnant), and S.D. Kluger (voiced by Astaire) in this special.); Nestor, the Long-Eared Christmas Donkey (1977) (Note: Recurring characters in this special include Santa (voiced by Frees), alongside Rudolph and his other featured reindeer.); The Stingiest Man in Town (1978) (Note: Recurring characters in this special include Santa Claus during a scene which compares the Ghost of Christmas Present to him (both characters were voiced by Frees).); Jack Frost (1979) (Note: The recurring character is Jack Frost (voiced by Robert Morse) in this special.); Rudolph and Frosty's Christmas in July (1979) (Note: Recurring characters include Rudolph (voiced by Richards), Frosty (voiced by Vernon), Santa (voiced by Rooney), Mrs. Claus (voiced by Darlene Conley), Crystal (voiced by Winters), and Jack Frost (voiced by Frees) in this special. Santa's other reindeer also feature.); Pinocchio's Christmas (1980) (Note: The recurring characters in the special include Santa (voiced by Swift), alongside his featured reindeer.); Frosty Returns (1992) (Note: The recurring character is Frosty (voiced by John Goodman) in this special. Mother Nature is also referenced in the short.); Rudolph the Red-Nosed Reindeer and the Island of Misfit Toys (2001) (Note: Recurring characters include Rudolph (voiced by Kathleen Barr), Santa (voiced by Garry Chalk), and Mrs. Claus (also voiced by Barr) in this film. Santa's other reindeer, and various other characters from the 1964 original also feature.); The Legend of Frosty the Snowman (2005) (Note: Recurring characters include Frosty (voiced by Bill Fagerbakke), and Professor Tinkerton (voiced by Kath Soucie) in this special.); A Miser Brothers' Christmas (2008) (Note: Recurring characters include Snow Miser (voiced by Juan Chioran), Heat Miser (voiced by Irving), Santa (voiced by Rooney), Mrs. Claus (voiced by Catherine Disher), and Mother Earth (voiced by Patricia Hamilton) in this special. Santa's reindeer also feature.)

The First Easter Rabbit is an American animated Easter television special that premiered April 9, 1976, on NBC and later aired on CBS. Created by Rankin/Bass Productions, it tells the story of the Easter Bunny's origin. The special is loosely based on the 1922 children's book The Velveteen Rabbit by Margery Williams. Burl Ives narrates the special which also features the Irving Berlin song "Easter Parade". It marked Ives's return to a Rankin/Bass special for the first time since the company's 1964 stop motion television special Rudolph the Red-Nosed Reindeer twelve years prior.

== Plot ==
G.B., a rabbit, tells the story of Stuffy, who began as a stuffed rabbit given as a Christmas present to a little girl named Glinda. Soon afterward, Stuffy encounters Spats, Flops, and Whiskers, a trio of scheming live rabbits who mock Stuffy for not being real. One day, when Glinda becomes sick after contracting scarlet fever, her clothes and old toys, including Stuffy, are thrown away to be burned in order to disinfect the playroom.

Stuffy is rescued by a sprite named Calliope, who brings him to life and sends him to Easter Valley at the North Pole. Along the way, he again encounters Spats, Flops, and Whiskers, who join him, expecting profit. The four meet Santa Claus who shows the way to Easter Valley and convinces Stuffy’s companions to give up their selfish ways and help him with the Easter traditions.

Meanwhile, an ice being named Zero, aided by his reluctant henchman, a sapient snowball named Bruce, discovers the secret passage to Easter Valley and manages to freeze the valley by stealing the Golden Easter Lily, which has the power to keep the valley in eternal springtime. Due to the theft, Stuffy and the other rabbits, who have been preparing Easter eggs and other presents for Glinda’s hometown, are snowed in and consequently unable to make their Easter delivery.

However, Bruce, remorseful about his role in the theft, confesses to Santa, who rescues the rabbits, allowing them to make the Easter delivery. Stuffy’s delivery to Glinda, who has by now recovered from her illness, is a new Easter bonnet and an invitation to the local Easter parade. Due to the timely gift of a new Easter outfit from her doctor, Jonathan (who is implied to be pursuing Glinda’s mother romantically), Glinda is able to attend the parade. There, she and Stuffy again meet, and the two sing Easter Parade.

After the parade, Santa forces Zero to return the Golden Easter Lily to the valley. As Zero does so, he meets Stuffy for the first and only time. Stuffy's rabbit companions then give Stuffy a new name, G.B., revealing that it is his older self who has been narrating the story all along. He wishes the audience, "Happy Easter!", ending the special.

== Cast ==
- Burl Ives as G.B.
- Robert Morse as Stuffy
- Stan Freberg as Flops
- Paul Frees as Santa Claus, Zero, Spats
- Joan Gardner as Elizabeth, Calliope
- Don Messick as Jonathan, Whiskers, Bruce the Snowball
- Dina Lynn as Glinda
- Christine Winter as Vocalist

== Soundtrack ==
LP album cover

Although not commercially released, a soundtrack album for the special was released in 1976 for demonstration and promotional purposes by NBC.

1. "There's That Rabbit" - G.B., Stuffy, and Chorus
2. "Easter Parade" - G.B., Stuffy, and Cast

== Crew ==
- Producers/Directors - Jules Bass, Arthur Rankin, Jr.
- Writer - Julian P. Gardner
  - Music and Lyrics - Jules Bass, Irving Berlin, Maury Laws
- Sound - John Curcio, Don Hahn, Dave Iveland, Tom Clack
- Post Production Editing - Irwin Goldress
  - Animation - Toru Hara, Tsuguyuki Kubo
- Design - Paul Coker, Jr.
- Music Arranger and Conductor - Maury Laws

== Home media ==
The First Easter Rabbit was first released on VHS by ABC Video Enterprises and Golden Book Video in 1986. The second release, by Warner Home Video, to VHS occurred in 1993, and a remastered "Deluxe Edition" was issued on DVD in 2010.

== See also ==
- List of Easter television episodes
