= The Mouse on the Mayflower =

1968 TV special by Arthur Rankin, Jr., Jules Bass

- Official logo
- Genre: Thanksgiving, Animation, Adventure, Comedy
- Written by: Romeo Muller
- Directed by: Jules Bass; Arthur Rankin Jr.
- Starring: Tennessee Ernie Ford; John Gary; Eddie Albert; Joanie Sommers; Paul Frees; June Foray
- Music by: Maury Laws (music); Jules Bass (lyrics)
- Country of origin: United States
- Original language: English

Production
- Producers: Jules Bass; Arthur Rankin, Jr.
- Running time: 45 minutes
- Production companies: Rankin/Bass Productions; Animation: Toei Animation

Original release
- Network: NBC
- Release: November 23, 1968

The Mouse on the Mayflower is a 1968 animated Thanksgiving television special created by Rankin/Bass Productions and animated by Japanese studio Toei Animation. It was the first official special under the Rankin/Bass moniker after changing its name from Videocraft the previous year. It debuted on NBC on November 23, 1968. The special is about a church mouse named Willum, who is discovered on the Mayflower. Tennessee Ernie Ford voices Willum Mouse, Esq. and narrates.

== Plot ==
The famous ship called Mayflower is trapped amidst a huge storm. The entire story is narrated by a church-mouse called Willum, from his viewpoint. The tale begins with the pilgrim preachers deciding to move to America and getting aboard the Mayflower. However, because of the huge storm, the ship gets on the verge of sinking. Then, Willum, the pilgrim mouse, comes up with an idea to save the ship.

When the pilgrims land safely, they write the Mayflower Compact and start constructing their new church and colony. However, it is already the autumn season and they do not have much food stored for the winter. The pilgrims then learn to plant crops during the spring season and celebrate a big feast toward the onset of the autumn season or fall. This is their first Thanksgiving celebration.

== Cast ==
- Tennessee Ernie Ford as Narrator, Willum Mouse, Esq.
- Eddie Albert as Captain Standish
- John Gary as John Alden
- Joanie Sommers as Priscilla Mullins

=== Additional voices ===
- Paul Frees - Thunder Mouse, Captain Jones, Scurve, Quizzler, Smiling Buzzard, Pilgrims, Sailors
- June Foray - Charity Blake, Pilgrims

== Soundtrack ==
1. "Mayflower" - Tennessee Ernie Ford & Chorus
2. "One Day" – Chorus
3. "When She Looks At Me" – John Alden
4. "Elbow Room" – Tennessee Ernie Ford & Chorus
5. "When He Looks At Me" – Priscilla Mullins
6. "Time Stand Still" - John Alden & Priscilla Mullins
7. "This Land" - Chorus
8. "Good Times" - Tennessee Ernie Ford & Chorus
9. "November" - Tennessee Ernie Ford & Chorus
10. "Mayflower (Reprise)" - Tennessee Ernie Ford & Chorus

A vinyl version of the soundtrack was issued in 1968, paired with The Little Drummer Boy to promote the specials; copies were sent to radio disc jockeys.

== Crew ==
- Producers/Directors: Jules Bass, Arthur Rankin Jr.
- Writer: Romeo Muller
- Music: Maury Laws
- Lyrics: Jules Bass
- Animation Production: Toei Animation (as Toei Studios)
- Key Animation: Tsuguyuki Kubo, Hayao Miyazaki
- Musical Director: Maury Laws
- Recording Supervision: Jim Harris, Phil Kaye

== Home media ==
The Mouse on the Mayflower was first released on VHS by Family Home Entertainment in 1989 and 1993. Sony Wonder and Golden Books Family Entertainment also released the special on VHS in the Holiday Classics Collection line in 1998.

== See also ==
- Ben and Me, a previous novel and short film involving anthropomorphic mice secretly influencing American history
- Thanksgiving in the Land of Oz (1980), also written by Romeo Muller
