= The Little Drummer Boy (TV special) =

1968 Christmas TV special

- Official logo
- Genre: Christmas
- Based on: "The Little Drummer Boy" Katherine Davis; Jack Halloran
- Written by: Romeo Muller
- Directed by: Jules Bass; Arthur Rankin Jr.
- Starring: Teddy Eccles; Jose Ferrer; Paul Frees; June Foray
- Narrated by: Greer Garson
- Theme music composer: Maury Laws
- Countries of origin: United States; Japan
- Original language: English

Production
- Producers: Jules Bass; Arthur Rankin Jr.
- Cinematography: Takeo Nakamura (uncredited)
- Running time: 25 minutes
- Production company: Rankin/Bass Productions

Original release
- Network: CTV Television Network; NBC
- Release: December 19, 1968

Related
- The Little Drummer Boy, Book II

The Little Drummer Boy is a stop motion television special produced by Rankin/Bass Productions, based on the song of the same name. It was first televised in Canada on December 19, 1968, on the CTV Television Network, followed four days later by its American nationwide telecast on NBC. A sequel was broadcast in 1976.

== Plot ==
A Jewish boy named Aaron lives a peaceful life on a farm with his parents and three animals – a donkey named Samson, a lamb named Baba, and a camel named Joshua. Aaron is given a drum on his birthday, which makes the animals dance with joy when he plays it. One night, bandits attack the farm and kill Aaron's parents. Aaron survives, but is left emotionally scarred and vows to hate all mankind.

Aaron's drumming abilities catch the attention of Ben Haramed, who kidnaps him and makes him join the caravan with rather inept performers against his will. When performing in Jerusalem, Aaron becomes infuriated by the townspeople's amusement and lashes out at the townspeople, accusing them of being thieves and knaves, for which Ben verbally castigates him before they continue on their way.

Some time later, the troupe comes upon the Magi caravan who are following a bright star in the sky. Seizing his chance, Ben greedily attempts to perform for the Magi Melchior, Casper, and Balthazar, but they are uninterested as they try to make haste to get to the star's destination. One of the caravan camels becomes too weak to continue traveling and the Magi has no extra camel, so Ben seizes Aaron and bargains with them that they use Joshua in exchange for some of their gold. Aaron refuses to take any gold from Ben and leaves for Bethlehem with Samson and Baba.

Later Aaron and his two remaining animal companions Samson and Baba escape, climb the tallest hill and join up with the Magi as they follow the star and then journey toward Bethlehem. There, upon recognizing Joshua and trying to reunite with the camel, Baba is struck by a Roman chariot.

Aaron takes the injured lamb to the Magi to be healed, but they insist that maybe the baby can help. Having no gift to give to the baby, Aaron decides that his "gift" to Him and His parents will be his playing his drum for them. As a sign of gratitude, Baba is healed and rushes into Aaron's arms, filling Aaron's heart with joy at last.

== Voice cast ==
- Greer Garson as "Our Storyteller"
- Teddy Eccles as Aaron
- Jose Ferrer as Ben Haramad
- Paul Frees as:
  - Ali
  - Aaron's father
  - Melchior
  - Gaspar
  - Balthazar
  - Samson
  - Baba
  - Joshua
  - Guards
  - Male townspeople
  - Chariot Driver
  - Missal & Jamil (Tumblers)
- June Foray as:
  - Aaron's mother
  - Female townspeople
- The Vienna Boys' Choir singing the title song.

== Soundtrack ==
1. "The Little Drummer Boy" – The Vienna Boys' Choir
2. "The Goose Hangs High" – Ben Haramad
3. "Why Can’t the Animals Smile?" – Aaron
4. "One Star in the Night" – The Vienna Boys' Choir
5. "The Little Drummer Boy (Reprise)" – The Vienna Boys' Choir

A vinyl version of the soundtrack was issued in 1968, paired with The Mouse on the Mayflower to promote the specials; copies were sent to radio disc jockeys.

A composite edit of the title track and its reprise were later included on the compilation album Rudolph, Frosty and Friends Favourite Christmas Songs (1996).

== Reception ==
An original release advertisement.

The Little Drummer Boy received an approval rating of 75% on review aggregator website Rotten Tomatoes, based on thirteen reviews. The site's critical consensus reads: "The Little Drummer Boy is a mature addition to the Rankin-Bass catalogue, with a powerful conclusion that compensates for the special's dour storytelling and unpolished animation." Contemporary reviews rated it highly, with a 1970 viewer survey ranking it among the best Christmas specials to air that year.

== Restoration problems ==
In 1998, restoration of The Little Drummer Boy by Golden Book Video/Sony Wonder was hindered because the film's original 35mm negative went missing during the transfer of elements from Broadway Video/Family Home Entertainment, according to Rankin/Bass historian Rick Goldschmidt. A 16mm print was located, as well as an unreleased stereo soundtrack. However, the latter was missing several sound effects, most notably a piece of narration in the final scene, which instead used a scratch track by Paul Frees. There have been no known efforts by the subsequent owners or distributors of the film to locate the missing elements and produce a proper restoration.

== 1976 sequel ==
In 1976, Rankin/Bass produced a sequel, titled The Little Drummer Boy, Book II, again sponsored by the American Gas Association. It premiered on December 13, 1976, on NBC, and like its predecessor, has also aired on Freeform and separately on AMC as of 2018. Warner Bros. is the show's current distributor through their ownership of the post–September 1974 Rankin/Bass Productions library via Telepictures. In this sequel, written by Jules Bass (under the pseudonym Julian P. Gardner), Aaron and his animal friends team up with Melchior, one of the Magi, to protect silver bells, made to ring for Christ's arrival, from a band of greedy Roman soldiers. Warner Archive released The Little Drummer Boy Book II, in a collection called Rankin/Bass TV Holiday Favorites Collection.

=== Voice cast ===
- Greer Garson as Our Storyteller
- Zero Mostel as Brutus
- David Jay as Aaron
- Bob McFadden as Plato
- Ray Owens as Melchior
- Allen Swift as Simeon and The Soldiers

== See also ==
- List of Rankin/Bass Productions films
- List of Christmas films
