= The Beatniks (film) =

1958 crime film

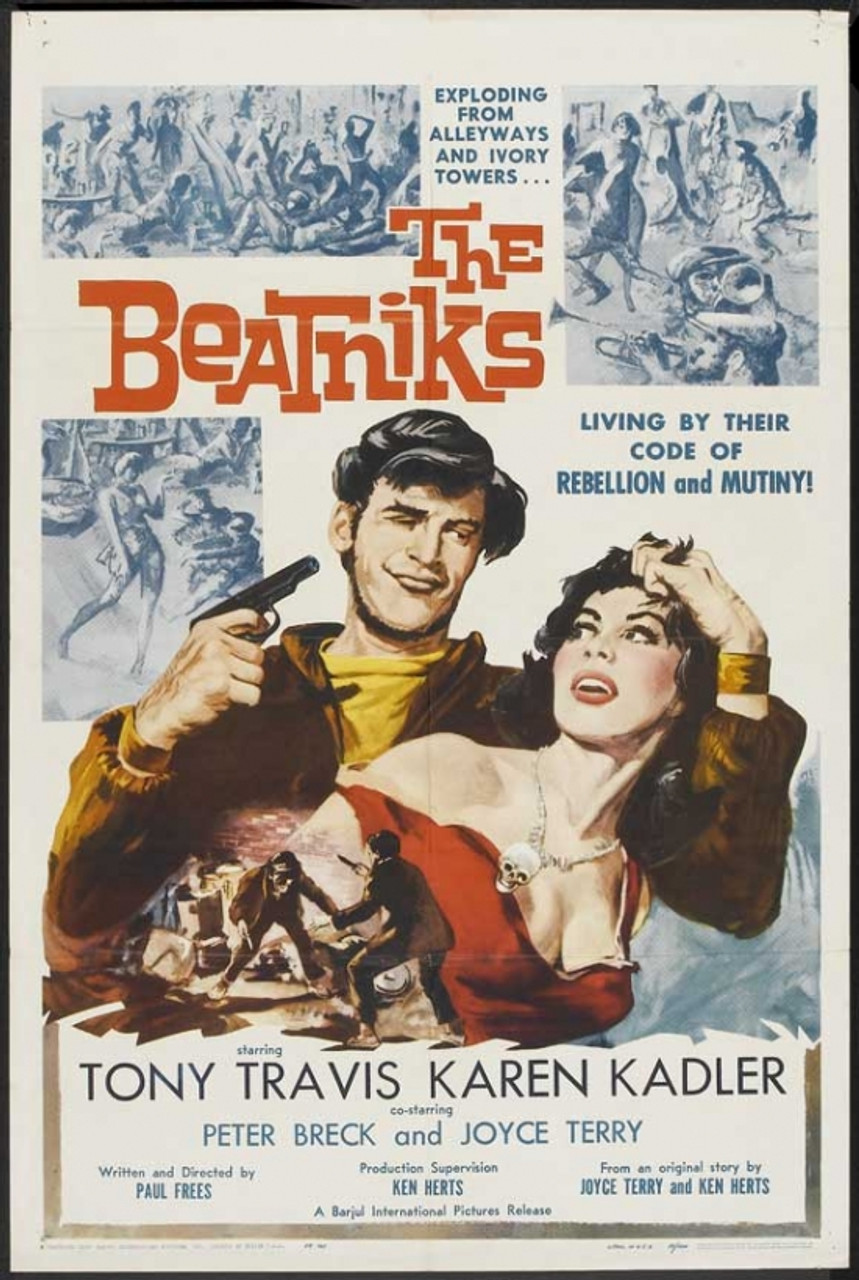
- Theatrical release poster
- Directed by: Paul Frees
- Written by: Paul Frees; Arthur Julian
- Produced by: Edward Heite; Ron Miller
- Starring: Tony Travis; Karen Kadler; Peter Breck; Joyce Terry; Bob Wells; Sam Edwards
- Cinematography: Murray De Atley
- Edited by: Harold White
- Release date: 1959
- Running time: 77 minutes
- Country: United States
- Language: English

The Beatniks (1959) by Paul Frees

The Beatniks is an American crime film in the teensploitation genre directed by Paul Frees that was filmed in 1958 and released in 1959. It was also featured on the movie-mocking program Mystery Science Theater 3000.

== Plot ==
Eddy Crane is the leader of a gang that robs small businesses for petty cash. At one point his gang accosts the broken-down car of Harry Bayliss, who is a music business executive. Afterward, Bayliss wishes to call a tow truck, so he goes into the diner where Eddy's gang is celebrating. Bayliss overhears Eddy singing to the jukebox and offers him a chance to audition for his variety program. Eddy accepts, passes his audition, and is given a spot on television. Eddy sings a two-minute song that is apparently stupendously successful, with Bayliss calling Eddy an "overnight sensation" and prophesying an astounding rise to fame, complete with a hit record, "a guest spot on every top show," and eventually culminating with "The Eddy Crane Show". Atop Eddy's newfound success, he also begins making advances toward Bayliss' secretary, Helen Tracy, in preference over his long-suffering girlfriend Iris.

The specter of Eddy's stardom raises dissension among his gang, who wish either to accompany him on his ascent, or to hold him back in their ranks. Iris is also jealous of Helen, with whom Eddy has been carrying on an affair. Helen eventually professes her love for Eddy. When one of Eddy's gang members, Moon, kills a fat barkeep, this threatens to drag Eddy down by association. Moon runs from the police, but is tracked down by Eddy, who delivers him for arrest. With this he definitively separates himself from the rest of his gang and from Iris, but also destroys his prospects for a singing career with his own arrest.

== Cast ==
- Tony Travis as Eddy Crane
- Karen Kadler as Iris
- Peter Breck as Bob "Moon" Mooney
- Joyce Terry as Helen Tracy
- Bob Wells as Chuck
- Sam Edwards as Red
- Charles Delaney as Harry Bayliss (final role)
- Stanley Farrar as Mr. Ray Morrissey
- Claude Stroud as hotel manager
- Martha Wentworth as Nadine (Iris' mother)
- Bob Pacquin as hotel detective
- Frank Worth as Gus the barkeep

== Production ==
The film was shot in 1958 with the working title of Sideburns and Sympathy. That same year it was announced the film was to be produced by Elmer Carl Rhodan Jr. (1922–1959). In addition to producing teen exploitation films such as Corn's-A-Poppin' (1955), The Delinquents (1957), Daddy-O (1958), and The Cool and the Crazy (1958), Rhodan was the son of the owner of the Midwestern Commonwealth Theatre chain.

== Mystery Science Theater 3000 ==
The Beatniks was used in episode #415 of Mystery Science Theater 3000, which premiered on Comedy Central on November 25, 1992., as part of the Turkey Day 1992 marathon. The movie was paired with a short, part of an episode of General Hospital. The writers fixated on a pair of phrases from the movie: Mooney shrieking, "I killed that fat barkeep!" and Eddie saying, "Shut up, Iris. I tell ya shut up." The two phrases were used in many later episodes.

Paste writer Jim Vorel ranked the episode very low, placing it at #176 in his examination of episodes from the first twelve seasons. (Note: Ranking based on 197 episodes as of 2018.) Vorel says the episode is unmemorable. The Beatniks itself is "an uneven but not horrendous movie that blends into all of the other crime stories (always with a twist of teen-friendly rock music) that make up a ton of episodes between seasons 2-6." The General Hospital short doesn't help either, as Vorel writes the soap opera segments are "among the least memorable for whatever reason."

The episode featuring the film was released on the Mystery Science Theater 3000: Volume XVII DVD collection by Shout! Factory on March 16, 2010. The Beatniks disc includes the film's original theatrical trailer. Other episodes in the collection include The Crawling Eye (episode #101), The Final Sacrifice (episode #910), and The Blood Waters of Dr. Z (episode #1005).

== Soundtrack ==
Songs for The Beatniks were written by songwriter Eddie Brandt and director Paul Frees.
