= Paul Coker =

American illustrator (1929–2022)

- Born: Paul Coker Jr. March 5, 1929; Lawrence, Kansas, U.S.
- Died: July 23, 2022 (aged 93); Santa Fe, New Mexico, U.S.
- Occupations: Comic artist, Illustrator

Signature
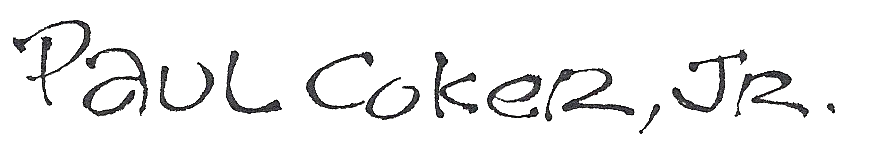

Paul Coker Jr. (March 5, 1929 – July 23, 2022) was an American illustrator. He worked in many media, including Mad, character design for a majority of Rankin/Bass TV specials, greeting cards, and advertising.

== Career ==
Coker was born in Lawrence, Kansas, the son of Bernice (Rutherford) and Paul Coker. One of his first professional works was in 1946 when he designed Chesty Lion, the mascot for Lawrence High School in Kansas. His first appearance in Mad was in 1961; he went on to illustrate over 375 articles for the magazine. Beginning in 1967, Coker was a production designer on more than a dozen Rankin/Bass television specials and shorts throughout its years of production, including Frosty the Snowman, Santa Claus Is Comin' to Town, Here Comes Peter Cottontail, The Year Without a Santa Claus, Rudolph's Shiny New Year, Frosty's Winter Wonderland, and The Easter Bunny Is Comin' to Town. In 1968, he illustrated the Mad paperback "MAD for Better or Verse"; written by Frank Jacobs, it was the first of eight all-new paperbacks drawn by Coker. In 2002, the magazine also published a collection of "Horrifying Cliches", the long-running feature that featured Coker art. Coker collaborated with writer Don Edwing on two comic strips: "Lancelot" and "Horace and Buggy".

== Works ==
=== Rankin/Bass Productions ===
- The Wacky World of Mother Goose (1967) (uncredited)
- Cricket on the Hearth (1967)
- Frosty the Snowman (1969)
- The Reluctant Dragon & Mr. Toad Show (1970)
- Santa Claus is Comin' to Town (1970)
- Here Comes Peter Cottontail (1971)
- The Enchanted World of Danny Kaye (1972)
- The Red Baron (1972)
- Mad Mad Mad Monsters (1972) (uncredited)
- Festival of Family Classics (1972–73)
- 'Twas the Night Before Christmas (1974)
- The Year Without a Santa Claus (1974)
- Rudolph's Shiny New Year (1976)
- The First Easter Rabbit (1976)
- Frosty's Winter Wonderland (1976)
- The Easter Bunny is Comin' to Town (1977)
- Nestor, the Long-Eared Christmas Donkey (1977)
- The Stingiest Man in Town (1978)
- Rudolph and Frosty's Christmas in July (1979)
- Jack Frost (1979)
- Pinocchio's Christmas (1980)
- The Leprechauns' Christmas Gold (1981)
- Santa, Baby! (2001)
