= Maury Laws =

American composer (1923–2019)

- Born: December 6, 1923; Burlington, North Carolina, U.S.
- Died: March 28, 2019 (aged 95); Appleton, Wisconsin, U.S.
- Occupation: composer
- Years active: 1934–1985
- Spouse: Karen (/Krumm) Rutledge

Maury Laws (December 6, 1923 – March 28, 2019) was an American television and film composer from Burlington, North Carolina.

== Biography ==
In his teens, Laws performed in local country, jazz and dance bands as a singer and guitarist in his home state of North Carolina. His career was put on hold during World War II, in which he served in the Army.

In 1964, he was hired as music director for the television production company Videocraft International (now known as Rankin/Bass), a post which he held for roughly 20 years. In this capacity, he conducted and scored music for a number of animated features, including The Hobbit, Jack Frost, The Flight of Dragons, The Daydreamer, The Wacky World of Mother Goose, Santa Claus Is Comin' To Town, and Frosty the Snowman. His most widely known work may be an adaptation of Johnny Marks' score for the well-known Christmas special Rudolph the Red-Nosed Reindeer, first aired in 1964. Laws also did composing work on a 1967 Rankin/Bass theatrical feature, the Halloween-themed Mad Monster Party?.

Maury Laws died in Appleton, Wisconsin on March 28, 2019.

== Filmography ==
- Rudolph the Red-Nosed Reindeer (1964)
- Return to Oz (1964)
- The Daydreamer (1966)
- The King Kong Show (1966–1969)
- Ballad of Smokey the Bear (1966)
- Mad Monster Party? (1966, 1967)
- Cricket on the Hearth (1967)
- The Wacky World of Mother Goose (1967)
- Mouse on the Mayflower (1968)
- The Little Drummer Boy (1968)
- The Smokey Bear Show (1969–1970)
- Frosty the Snowman (1969)
- The Mad, Mad, Mad Comedians (1970)
- The Reluctant Dragon & Mr. Toad Show (1970–1971)
- The Tomfoolery Show (1970–1971)
- Santa Claus is Comin' to Town (1970)
- Here Comes Peter Cottontail (1971)
- The Jackson 5ive (1971–1972)
- The Enchanted World of Danny Kaye: The Emperor's New Clothes (1972)
- The Osmonds (1972)
- Mad Mad Mad Monsters (1972)
- Willie Mays and the Say-Hey Kid (1972)
- The Red Baron (1972)
- Festival of Family Classics (1972–1973)
- That Girl in Wonderland (1973)
- Marco (1973)
- 'Twas the Night Before Christmas (1974)
- The Year Without a Santa Claus (1974)
- The First Christmas: The Story of the First Christmas Snow (1975)
- Rudolph's Shiny New Year (1975, 1976)
- The First Easter Rabbit (1976)
- Frosty's Winter Wonderland (1976)
- The Little Drummer Boy, Book II (1976)
- The Muppet Show (1976-1981)
- The Easter Bunny is Comin' to Town (1977)
- The Last Dinosaur (1977)
- The Hobbit (1977)
- Nestor the Long–Eared Christmas Donkey (1977)
- The Stingiest Man in Town (1978)
- Rudolph and Frosty's Christmas in July (1979)
- The Return of the King (1979, 1980)
- Pinocchio's Christmas (1980)
- The Bushido Blade (1981)
- The Leprechaun's Christmas Gold (1981)
- The Flight of Dragons (1982)
- The Wind in the Willows (1985, 1987)
