= Crime Correspondent =

American radio mystery series (1949)

Crime Correspondent is an American radio mystery series that debuted on CBS on November 4, 1949.

== Overview ==
Paul Frees portrayed Larry Mitchell, a broadcaster who reported on the ongoing battle between police and criminals. Each episode began with a crime report by Mitchell and then made a transition to flashbacks that had "an essential part in featured commentary". The premiere episode had Mitchell investigating the case of Dino Seroti, who killed himself during a shootout with police rather than let the law officers take him prisoner. Mitchell's curiosity was aroused after he learned that Seroti had been sought only for questioning. The November 11, 1949, episode was "Squeeze Play", and the November 18, 1949, episode was "Firebug".

== Production ==
Crime Correspondent replaced Abe Burrows's program at 9:30 p.m. on Fridays. Gorton T. Hughes produced and directed the show; Frees and Adrian Gendot were the writers. Marlin Skyles and his orchestra provided music. Paul Masterson was the announcer. The program was sustaining. It originated from Hollywood.

== Critical response ==
A review in the trade publication Billboard said that Crime Correspondent "is a pseudo-documentary with dull dialog, badly timed sound effects and one of those omnipotent journalists as its amateur sleuth hero". The review said that the show's musical components were better than the script.
