= Paul Frees =

American actor (1920–1986)

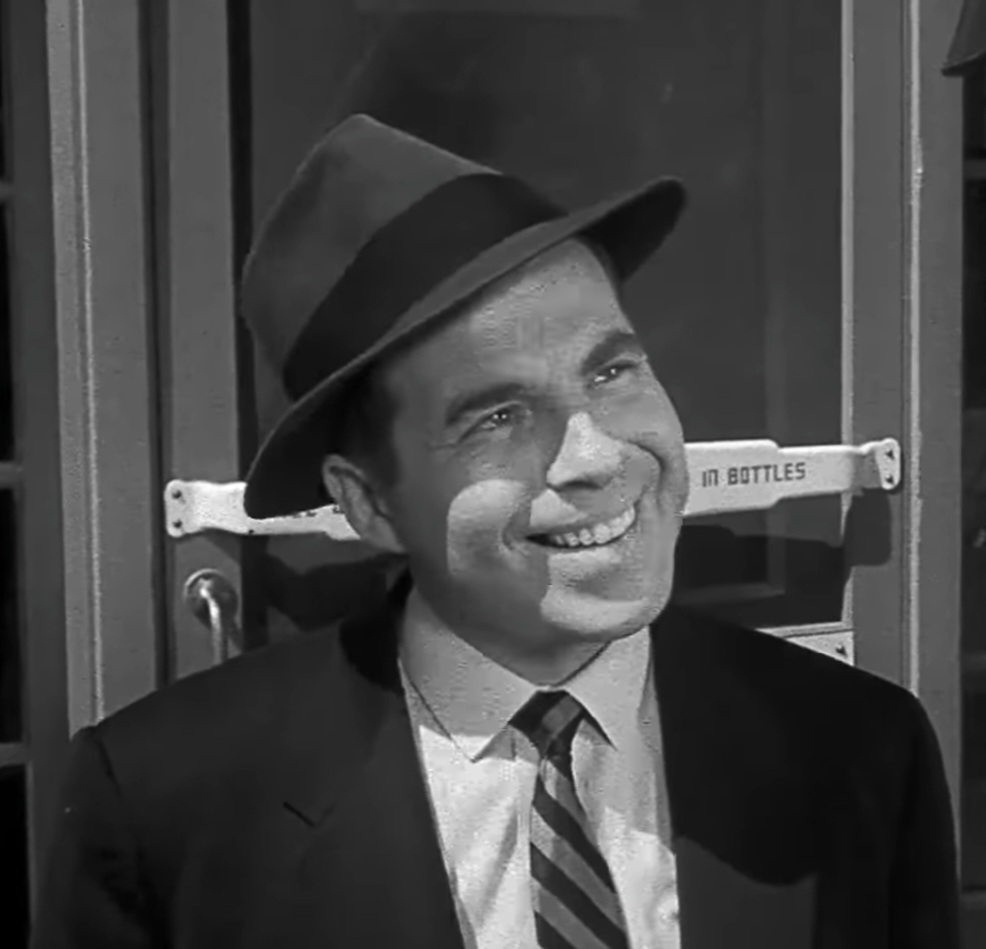
- Frees in Suddenly (1954)
- Born: Solomon Hersh Frees; June 22, 1920; Chicago, Illinois, U.S.
- Died: November 2, 1986 (aged 66); Tiburon, California, U.S.
- Other names: The Man of a Thousand Voices; Solomon Hersh Frees; Solomon Frees; Paul Hersh Frees; Buddy Green
- Occupations: Actor; comedian; impressionist; vaudevillian
- Years active: 1942–1986
- Spouses: Anelle McCloud (m. 1943; died 1945); Kleda June Hansen (m. 1947; div. 1950); Joyce Schultz (m. 1951, divorced); Jeri J. Cole (m. 1967; div. 1969); Beverly T. Marlow (m. 1971)
- Children: 2

Solomon Hersh Frees (June 22, 1920 – November 2, 1986), better known as Paul Frees, was an American actor. He is known for his work on Metro-Goldwyn-Mayer, Walter Lantz, Rankin/Bass and Walt Disney theatrical cartoons during the Golden Age of Animation, and for providing the voice of Boris Badenov in The Rocky and Bullwinkle Show. Frees was sometimes known as "The Man of a Thousand Voices", an appellation more commonly bestowed on Mel Blanc.

== Early life ==
Solomon Hersh Frees was born to a Jewish family in Chicago, on June 22, 1920. He grew up in the Albany Park neighborhood and attended Von Steuben Junior High School.

== Career ==
In the 1930s, Frees first appeared in vaudeville as an impressionist, under the name Buddy Green. He began his career on radio in 1942 and remained active for more than 40 years. During that time, he was involved in more than 250 films, cartoons, and TV appearances; as was the case for many voice actors of the time, his appearances were often uncredited.

Frees's early radio career was cut short when he was drafted into the United States Army during World War II, where he fought at Normandy, France, on D-Day. He was wounded in action and was returned to the United States for a year of recuperation. He attended the Chouinard Art Institute under the G.I. Bill. When his first wife's health failed, he decided to drop out and return to radio work.

He appeared frequently on Hollywood radio series, including Escape, playing lead roles and alternating with William Conrad as the opening announcer. He announced the dramatic signature on Suspense in the late 1940s, and parts on Gunsmoke (filling in for Howard McNear as Doc Adams in the episode "The Cast"), and Crime Classics. One of his few starring roles in this medium was as Jethro Dumont/Green Lama in the 1949 series The Green Lama, as well as a syndicated anthology series The Player, in which Frees narrated and played all the parts. He starred as Larry Mitchell on Crime Correspondent on CBS Radio.

He did dubbing for live-action films including Midway, dubbing Toshiro Mifune's performances as Admiral Yamamoto; and Some Like It Hot, in which Frees provides much of the falsetto voice for Tony Curtis's female persona Josephine and the voice of funeral director Mozzarella. Frees dubbed the entire role of Eddie in the Disney film The Ugly Dachshund, replacing actor Dick Wessel, who had died of a sudden heart attack after completion of principal photography. Frees also dubbed some of Humphrey Bogart’s lines in his final film The Harder They Fall. Bogart was suffering from undiagnosed esophageal cancer and could barely be heard in some takes, requiring dubbing.

Frees worked extensively with at least nine of the major animation production companies of the 20th century: Walt Disney Productions, Warner Bros. Cartoons, Walter Lantz Productions, UPA, Hanna-Barbera Productions, Filmation, Metro-Goldwyn-Mayer, DePatie–Freleng Enterprises, Jay Ward Productions, Rankin/Bass, and Ruby-Spears.

=== Disney ===
Some of Frees's most memorable voices were for various Disney projects. Frees voiced Disney's Professor Ludwig Von Drake in 18 episodes of the Disney anthology television series, beginning with the first episode of the newly renamed Walt Disney's Wonderful World of Color on September 24, 1961. The character also appeared on many Disneyland Records. Von Drake's introductory cartoon, An Adventure in Color, featured "The Spectrum Song", sung by Frees as Von Drake. A different Frees recording of this song appeared on a children's record, and was later reissued on CD.

In addition to voicing characters, Frees narrated a number of Disney cartoons, including the Disney educational short film Donald in Mathmagic Land. This short originally aired in the same television episode as Von Drake's first appearance.

Frees also provided voices for numerous characters at Disney parks. He voiced the unseen "Ghost Host" at Haunted Mansion Attraction at Disneyland and Walt Disney World. For the Pirates of the Caribbean, Frees recorded the ghost voice saying the iconic "dead men tell no tales" used in the ride, as well as lending his voice to several audio-animatronic characters, including the Auctioneer, Magistrate Carlos, and the "Pooped Pirate" in the ride. Disney eventually issued limited edition compact discs commemorating The Haunted Mansion and Pirates of the Caribbean, featuring some outtakes and unused audio tracks by Frees and others. Frees also provided narration for the Tomorrowland attraction Adventure Thru Inner Space (1967–1985, later replaced by Star Tours) and the original Great Moments with Mr. Lincoln. Audio clips from the attractions in Frees's distinctive voice have been included in fireworks shows at Disneyland.

An animated singing bust in Frees's likeness appeared in the 2003 film The Haunted Mansion as a tribute. Similarly, audio recordings of Frees from the Pirates of the Caribbean attraction can be heard in Pirates of the Caribbean: At World's End in an homage to the ride.

Frees also had a small on-camera role for Disney in the 1959 film The Shaggy Dog, playing Dr. Galvin, a police psychiatrist who attempts to understand why Mr. Daniels believes a shaggy dog can uncover a spy ring. He also speaks the film's opening narration.

His other Disney credits, most of them narration for segments of the Disney anthology television series, include:

- The "Man in Space" series of shows (TV, 1954)
- From Aesop to Hans Christian Andersen (TV, 1955)
- Mars and Beyond (film, 1957)
- The Nine Lives of Elfego Baca (TV miniseries, 1958)
- Tales of Texas John Slaughter (TV miniseries, 1958)
- The Absent-Minded Professor (film, 1961)
- Moochie of Pop Warner Football (TV, 1960)
- The Monkey's Uncle (film, 1965)

For his contributions to the Disney legacy, Frees was honored posthumously as a Disney Legend on October 9, 2006.

=== Jay Ward Productions ===
Frees was a regular presence in Jay Ward cartoons, providing the voices of Boris Badenov (from The Rocky and Bullwinkle Show), Inspector Fenwick (from Dudley Do-Right, impersonating Eric Blore), Ape (impersonating Ronald Colman), District Commissioner Alistair and Weevil Plumtree in George of the Jungle, Baron Otto Matic in Tom Slick, Fred in Super Chicken, and the Hoppity Hooper narrator, among numerous others.

=== Rankin/Bass ===
Frees is well-remembered for providing the voices for many characters in Rankin/Bass cartoons and stop-motion animated TV specials, most notably for a number of holiday-themed specials. In 1968, he appeared as Captain Jones in the Thanksgiving special The Mouse on the Mayflower, and that Christmas he appeared as the father of the Drummer Boy, Ali, and as the three Wise Men in The Little Drummer Boy. He was also Hocus Pocus, the traffic cop, the ticket-taker, and Santa Claus in Frosty the Snowman in 1969 and played the central villain, Burgermeister Meisterburger, and his assistant Grimsley in Santa Claus Is Comin' to Town in 1970. He provided several voices, including Aeon the Terrible, for Rudolph's Shiny New Year in 1976.

Frees also voiced King Haggard's wizard Mabruk and the Cat in The Last Unicorn and provided several voices for the Jackson Five cartoon series between 1971 and 1973. He provided the voices for several J. R. R. Tolkien characters (most notably the dwarf Bombur) in Rankin/Bass animated versions of The Hobbit and The Return of the King.

Rankin/Bass TV specials or films featuring Paul Frees:

- Cricket on the Hearth (TV special) (1967) Voice of the Sea Captain and others
- The Mouse on the Mayflower (1968) Voice of Captain Jones
- The Little Drummer Boy (1968) Voices of Ali, Aaron's Father, Three Wise Men
- Frosty the Snowman (1969) Voices of Hocus Pocus, Traffic Cop, Ticket Taker, Santa Claus
- The Mad, Mad, Mad Comedians (1970) Voices of Chico Marx, Zeppo Marx, and W.C Fields (uncredited)
- Santa Claus Is Comin' to Town (1970) Voices of Burgermeister Meisterburger, Grimsley, Topper, Kringle brothers, Sombertown Civilian, Burgermeister's soldiers, Physician
- Here Comes Peter Cottontail (1971) Voices of Colonel Bunny's assistant, Fireman, Man at Thanksgiving Table, Santa Claus
- The First Easter Rabbit (1976) Voices of Santa, Zero, and Spats
- Frosty's Winter Wonderland (1976) Voices of Jack Frost and Traffic Cop
- Rudolph's Shiny New Year (1976) Voices of Santa Claus, General Ticker, Aeon the Terrible, Humpty Dumpty, 1776 (aka Sev)
- The Hobbit (1977) Voices of Bombur and Troll #1
- Nestor, the Long-Eared Christmas Donkey (1977) Voices of Santa Claus, Olaf and Donkey Dealer
- The Stingiest Man in Town (1978) voices of the Ghost of Christmas Past and the Ghost of Christmas present
- Rudolph and Frosty's Christmas in July (1979) Voices of Jack Frost, Policeman, Winterbolt
- Jack Frost (1979) Voices of Father Winter, Kubla Kraus
- The Return of the King (1980) Voices of Orc, Uruk-hai, Elrond (replacing the deceased Cyril Ritchard who voiced Elrond in The Hobbit)
- The Last Unicorn (1982) Voices of Mabruk and the Cat
- The Flight of Dragons (1982) Voice of Antiquity
- The Legend of Frosty the Snowman (2005) Voice of Hocus Pocus (Archive Recordings)

=== George Pal ===
Frees portrayed the Orson Welles sound-alike radio reporter in George Pal's film The War of the Worlds (1953), where he is seen dictating into a tape recorder as the military prepares the atomic bomb for use against the invading Martians. Memorably, his character says the recording is being made "for future history ... if any". Frees also provided the film's dramatic opening narration, prior to Cedric Hardwicke's voice-over tour of the Solar System.

Frees subsequently provided the apocalyptic voice for the "talking rings" in Pal's later film The Time Machine (1960), in which he explains the ultimate fate of humanity from which the time traveler realizes the origin of the Morlocks and Eloi.

Producer Pal later put Frees to work again in his fantasy film Atlantis, the Lost Continent (also 1960) and doing the opening voice-over narration for Pal's Doc Savage (1975) film.

Frees did the narration for the George Pal documentary The Fantasy Film Worlds of George Pal (1985), written, produced, and directed by Arnold Leibovit. Two years later, Frees provided the voice for Arnie the Dinosaur and the Pillsbury Doughboy in The Puppetoon Movie (1987), also produced and directed by Leibovit.

=== Other voice work ===
The versatile actor voiced several characters, including three of the main characters in the US versions of Belvision's Hergé's Adventures of Tintin cartoons, based on the books by Hergé.

At the MGM Animation studio, he did work for Hanna-Barbera in their Tom and Jerry shorts. In the 1956 Cinemascope Tom and Jerry cartoon, Blue Cat Blues, he was Jerry's voice who narrated the short; he voiced Jerry's cousin Muscles in Jerry's Cousin five years earlier and the cannibals in His Mouse Friday where he said the lines "Mmmmm, barbecued cat!" and "Mmmmm, barbecued mouse!"

Frees did multiple voice roles for Tex Avery's short films, notably playing every role in the Butch cartoon Cellbound in 1955. He also voiced Barney Bear in ten cartoons directed by Dick Lundy while Avery was on a sabbatical.

From October 1961 through September 1962, Paul Frees provided the voice for the shady lawyer named Judge Oliver Wendell Clutch, a weasel on the animated program Calvin and the Colonel starring the voices of Freeman Gosden and Charles Correll. The series was an animated television remake of their radio series Amos 'n Andy.

For the 1962 Christmas special Mister Magoo's Christmas Carol, produced by UPA, Paul Frees voiced several characters, including Fezziwig, the Charity Man, and two of the opportunists who steal from the dead Scrooge (Eyepatch Man and Tall Tophat Man) and Mister Magoo's Broadway theatre director. He subsequently provided numerous voices for the follow up series The Famous Adventures of Mr. Magoo.

Frees provided the voices of both John Lennon and George Harrison in the 1965 The Beatles cartoon series, the narrator, Big D and Fluid Man in the 1966 cartoon series, Frankenstein Jr. and The Impossibles, and The Thing in the 1967 series Fantastic Four, as well as President James Norcross in the 1967 cartoon series Super President. He played several roles – narrator, Chef of State, the judges and the bailiff – in the George Lucas / John Korty animated film, Twice Upon a Time.

Frees provided the voice-over for the trailer to the 1971 Clint Eastwood thriller, Play Misty for Me.

In television commercials, he was the voice of the Pillsbury Doughboy, the 7-Up bird Fresh-Up Freddie, Froot Loops spokesbird Toucan Sam (previously voiced by Mel Blanc, later voiced by Maurice LaMarche), Boo-Berry in the series of monster cereal commercials, and The Farmer who helps The Little Green Sprout, (voiced by Ike Eisenmann), by demonstrating the Jolly Green Giant's sweet and tender vegetables. He also played a British detective in a 1971 non-animated television commercial for Taster's Choice coffee.

Frees narrated many live action films and television series, including Naked City (1958–1963). Frees also provided the voice of the eccentric billionaire John Beresford Tipton, always seated in his chair with his back to the viewer while talking to his employee Michael Anthony (fellow voice-artist Marvin Miller), on the dramatic series The Millionaire.

He was the narrator at the beginning of the film The Disorderly Orderly starring Jerry Lewis. He also looped an actor's voice in the film The Ladies Man, also starring Jerry Lewis.

In 1980, Frees was hired by Program Director Hy Lit to be the voice of radio station WKXW (Kicks 101 1/2).

Frees had a wide range of other roles, usually heard but not seen, and frequently without screen credit. The resonance of his natural voice was similar to that of Orson Welles, and he performed a Welles impression several times. Some highlights of his voice work:

- Narrator for The Manchurian Candidate
- Narrated 16 episodes of the NBC military television series Steve Canyon, starring Dean Fredericks (1958–1959), and appeared on-screen as an RAF officer attached to a USAF command in the pilot episode, "Operation Towline."
- Narrated the documentary about J. Robert Oppenheimer, The Day After Trinity (1980)
- The Peter Lorre voice in the 1947 Spike Jones RCA Victor recording of the song "My Old Flame". When talking softly, the voice sounds much like Lorre. When the character segués into a manic rant for a few lines, the voice anticipates the Ludwig Von Drake characterization. Frees appeared on several other Spike Jones recordings including "Pop Corn Sack" also from 1947 in which he provided the voices of Charles Boyer, Edward G. Robinson, Katharine Hepburn and Al Jolson Frees worked with Jones on other projects, inluding two LP's, Spike Jones in Stereo (1959) and Omnibust (1960).
- Dialog looping for French actor Jacques Roux, among other uncredited voice work, in the 1963 film The List of Adrian Messenger
- The Orson Welles sound-alike narrator in Stan Freberg Presents The United States of America Vol. 1: The Early Years. When Vol. 2 came out after his death, he was replaced by Corey Burton.
- The voice of Peter Tishman who purchases Manhattan from the Indians on Stan Freberg Presents the United States of America Volume One: The Early Years (sounding very much like Ludwig Von Drake)
- Another Orson Welles sound-alike as the voice of the aliens in Earth vs. the Flying Saucers
- Yet another Orson Welles sound-alike opening the film Burn, Witch, Burn!, the American release of Night of the Eagle (1962), where for over two minutes he talks about witchcraft and invokes a banishing spell over the audience
- Yet again, as an Orson Welles sound-alike narrator in the 1967 film The St. Valentine's Day Massacre
- And another Orson Welles sound-alike narrator in the opening narration for the American release of the 1959 British film Jack the Ripper
- Uncredited voice of a reporter trying to get a quote from General George S. Patton in the 1970 film Patton
- Screen credit for multiple voices in the 1971 animated television film The Point!
- Uncredited voice of the sentient supercomputer Colossus in the film Colossus: The Forbin Project
- Narration for the spoof short film Hardware Wars (1977), which was styled as a mock film trailer specifically parodying Malachi Throne's narration of the original Star Wars trailer
- Second Voice of KARR in "K.I.T.T. vs. K.A.R.R." – a 3rd-season episode of Knight Rider
- Voice of "Josephine" (the female persona of Tony Curtis's character Joe) in the Billy Wilder film Some Like It Hot
- The voice of Dr. Hu in the English-language version of King Kong Escapes
- The voices of "Antoine" and "Alecto" in the English-language version of Atoll K (aka Utopia)
- The voice of the hermit crab Crusty in The Incredible Mr. Limpet, a Warner Bros. feature that mixed live action with animation
- Intro voice for the 1967 sitcom Mister Terrific
- Intro voice for Bradbury 13, a series of thirteen radio dramas featuring Ray Bradbury short stories, originally produced for National Public Radio by Michael McDonough at Brigham Young University, 1984
- Credited with singing "Darktown Strutters' Ball" in the 1971 film The Abominable Dr. Phibes (as heard on the film's soundtrack album, along with several other songs performed in character but not used in the film)
- Voice of the title character in the 1957 film The Cyclops
- Narrator of extended recap title sequence in early first-season episodes of I Dream of Jeannie in 1965 (and the show's sponsor I.D. announcer during season one)
- Featured on the 1959 Spike Jones album Spike Jones in Hi-Fi, A Spooktacular in Screaming Sound in recordings "Poisen to Poisen", "My Old Flame", "Everything Happens to Me" and "This is your Death", doing the vocal and voices. "Tammy": vocal by Paul Frees, "Two Heads are Better than One": vocal by George Rock and Paul Frees.
- The uncredited voice of the radio news announcer in the 1964 musical film Robin and the 7 Hoods
- The uncredited voice of Levi Calhoun (played by Robert Tessier) in the 1975 Western Breakheart Pass
- The uncredited English voice of Japanese Admiral Yamamoto in the 1976 film Midway
- Narrator and Voice of Satan (visualized in the film as a snake) in the 1962 film The World's Greatest Sinner

=== Other credits ===
Although Frees was primarily known for his voice work (like Mel Blanc, he was known in the industry as "The Man of a Thousand Voices"), he was also a songwriter and screenwriter. His most notable screenwriting work was the little-seen 1959 film The Beatniks, a screed against the then-rising Beat counterculture in the vein of Reefer Madness. In 1992, the film was mocked on an episode of Mystery Science Theater 3000.

On rare occasions, Frees appeared on-camera, usually in minor roles. In 1954, he appeared in the film noir classic Suddenly starring Frank Sinatra and Sterling Hayden. He played a scientist in The Thing from Another World, a death-row priest in A Place in the Sun, and French fur trader McMasters in The Big Sky. In 1955, he appeared as an irate husband suing his wife (played by Ann Doran) for alimony in an episode of CBS's sitcom The Ray Milland Show; and, in 1957, in an uncredited role as a helicopter pilot in the 1957 science-fiction movie, Beginning of the End.

In Jet Pilot, Frees plays a menacing Soviet officer whose job is to watchdog pilot Janet Leigh, but instead manages to eject himself from a parked jet, enabling Leigh to rescue John Wayne and fly back to the West. He is also credited with narrating the opening of the 1958-1959 series Rescue 8 starring Jim Davis and Lang Jefferies. In the 1970 film Patton, Frees provided the voices of a war correspondent interviewing Patton while Patton rides his horse, and of a member of Patton's staff, as well as voice-overs for several other actors, including the Moroccan official hosting a troop review for Patton. Frees is also heard in Tora! Tora! Tora! as the English-language voice of the Japanese ambassador to the United States. He also does the final narration in Beneath the Planet of the Apes, the first sequel to Planet of the Apes.

== Legacy ==
Since Frees's death, voice actor Corey Burton has often re-recorded dialogue for some Disneyland attractions originally recorded by Frees. In some cases, Frees's original, pre-digital recordings had simply deteriorated over time, and in others the dialogue had been rewritten to reflect plot changes or introduce new characters, such as the "Stuffed Pirate" replacing Frees's "Pooped Pirate" in the Pirates of the Caribbean ride in 1997. Dialogue that was slightly rewritten to reflect newer safety standards is performed by actors Joe Leahy (English) and Fabio Rodriguez (Spanish). In 2001, Burton provided a Paul Frees impression for the new "Ghost Host" of Haunted Mansion Holiday, a seasonal, holiday-themed overlay for the Haunted Mansion attraction. Burton also recorded Frees's Ghost Host lines for Walt Disney Pictures' 2003 film adaptation of the ride.

== Personal life ==
Frees was married five times. His first marriage was to Anelle McCloud, from 1943 until her death in 1945. He then married Kleda June Hansen in 1947, and they divorced in 1950. His third wife was voice actress Joyce Schultz. They married in 1951 and had two children before divorcing. His fourth marriage was to Jeri J. Cole in 1967; they divorced in 1969. Beverly T. Marlow was Frees's fifth wife. They married in 1971 and were estranged at the time of his death fifteen years later.

== Death ==
For the last two years of his life Frees suffered from multiple ailments, including arthritis, diabetes, and loss of vision, and had mentioned to friends that he was in near constant pain. Frees died at his home in Tiburon, California, on November 2, 1986, at the age of 66, from a self-administered overdose of pain medication. His death was considered a suicide; his agent issued a press release stating that he died from heart failure.

His body was cremated and his ashes scattered over the Pacific Ocean.

== Filmography ==
=== Live-action ===
==== Film ====
List of acting and voice performances in feature films
Film
Year	Title	Role	Notes
1949	The Adventures of Sir Galahad	The Black Knight (voice)	Uncredited
1950	Hunt the Man Down	Packard 'Packy' Collins	uncredited
1951	A Place in the Sun	Reverend Morrison	
1951	The Thing from Another World	Dr. Vorhees	
1951	His Kind of Woman	Corley	
1952	The Star	Richard Stanley	
1952	The Las Vegas Story	District Attorney	Uncredited
1953	The War of the Worlds	Radio Reporter / Opening Announcer	
1954	Suddenly	Benny	
1956	The Harder They Fall	Priest	
1956	Earth vs. the Flying Saucers	Alien (voice)	Uncredited
1956	Francis in the Haunted House	Francis (voice)	Uncredited
1957	The 27th Day	Ward Mason / Newscaster	Uncredited
1957	Jet Pilot	Lieutenant Tiompkin	Uncredited
1957	The Cyclops	Cyclops (voice)	
1957	Beginning of the End	Helicopter pilot	Uncredited
1958	Space Master X-7	Dr. Charles T. Pommer	
1959	The Shaggy Dog	Narrator / J. W. Galvin	Uncredited
1959	Some Like It Hot	Tony Curtis as Josephine	Uncredited
1959	Jack the Ripper	Narrator (voice)	Uncredited
1960	Spartacus	Caius (voice)	Uncredited
1960	The Beatniks	Various voices	Uncredited
1960	Tormented	Frank Hubbard (voice)	Uncredited
1961	The Absent-Minded Professor	Loudspeaker Voice / Air Force Dispatcher (voices)	Uncredited
1961	Snow White and the Three Stooges	Narrator / Magic Mirror (voice)	Uncredited
1962	The Magic Sword	Sir Ulrich of Germany (voice)	Uncredited
1962	The World's Greatest Sinner	Narrator / The Snake (voices)	
1962	The Manchurian Candidate	Narrator (voice)	Uncredited
1964	The Incredible Mr. Limpet	Crusty (voice)	
1964	Robin and the 7 Hoods	Radio News Announcer	
1964	The Disorderly Orderly	Narrator (voice)	Uncredited
1964	The Carpetbaggers	Narrator (voice)	Uncredited
1964	The Brass Bottle	Lawyer Jennings (voice)	Uncredited
1964	Mary Poppins	Barnyard Horse (voice)	Uncredited
1967	In Cold Blood	Radio Announcer (voice) / Policeman	Uncredited
1967	King Kong Escapes	Dr. Hu (voice)	Uncredited; English dub
1967	The St. Valentine's Day Massacre	Narrator (voice)	Uncredited
1969	Hell in the Pacific	Narrator (voice)	Voiceover for Toshiro Mifune as Captain Tsuruhiko Kuroda
1970	Tora! Tora! Tora!	Japanese Ambassador Kichisaburō Nomura (voice)	Uncredited
1970	Beneath the Planet of the Apes	Ending Voiceover (voice)	Uncredited
1970	Patton	War Correspondent / Member of the Staff of Patton / Sheik (voices)	Uncredited
1975	Doc Savage: The Man of Bronze	Narrator (voice)	Uncredited
1976	Midway	Admiral Isoroku Yamamoto (voice)	Uncredited
1976	The Milpitas Monster	Narrator (voice)	Creature Feature top 10 movie
1985	The Fantasy Film Worlds of George Pal	Narrator (voice)	Documentary about George Pal

==== Television ====
List of acting and voice performances in television shows
Television
Year	Title	Role	Notes
1952	Dangerous Assignment	Dr. Friedrich	Season 1 Episode 5 Episode: "The Manager Story"
1953	The Jack Benny Program	Narrator (voice)	Episode: "The Honolulu Trip"
1955	Meet Mr. McNutley	Husband	Live Action Episode; Episode: "Jury Duty"
1955–1956	The Bob Cummings Show	Television announcer	
1955–1960	The Millionaire	John Beresford Tipton (heard, but always unseen)	
1956	Jane Wyman Presents	Emcee	Episode: "Ten Percent"
1957	The Adventures of Jim Bowie	Etienne	Episode: "German George"
1958–1960	Rescue 8	Narrator (voice)	
1962–1964	Fractured Flickers	Narrator / Various	26 episodes
1966	Get Smart	Greenstreet Character / Lorre Character	Episode: "Casablanca"
1971, 1972	Hawaii Five-O	Steve McGarrett Imposter, Goro Shibata (voice)	Episodes: "Odd Man In", "The Ninety-Second War: Part I"
1972	Alias Smith and Jones	Hannibal Heyes	Episode: "The Men That Corrupted Hadleyburg"
1975	Wonder Woman	Prologue Narrator / Franklin D. Roosevelt	Episode: "The New Original Wonder Woman"
1984	Knight Rider	KARR (voice)	"K.I.T.T. VS K.A.R.R."

=== Voice roles ===
==== Film ====
List of voice performances in animated feature films
Film
Year	Title	Role	Notes
1950	Primitive Pluto	Primo	Pluto Short
1951	Jerry's Cousin	Cousin Muscles, Leader of gang cat's thugs	
1951	Sleepy-Time Tom	Tom Cat (snoring) / Lightning Cat	
1951	His Mouse Friday	Jerry / Cannibals	Uncredited
1952	Magical Maestro	Butch (singing "Everything I Have is Yours")	Uncredited
1952	Cruise Cat	Ship's Captain	
1952	Busybody Bear	Barney Bear	
1953	Life with Tom	Radio Announcer	
1953	The Missing Mouse	Radio Announcer	
1953	Wee Willy Wildcat	Barney Bear	
1953	T.V. of Tomorrow	Narrator	
1954	Homesteader Droopy	Narrator	
1954	The Farm of Tomorrow	Narrator	
1955	Cellbound	Prisoner / Warden / Little Wife	
1956	Down Beat Bear	First Radio Announcer	
1956	Blue Cat Blues	Jerry Mouse	
1957	The Snow Queen	Ol Dreamy / the Raven	English Voice; Uncredited
1959	Donald in Mathmagic Land	The True Spirit of Adventure / Pi creature	
1959	Noah's Ark	Noah / God	
1960	Loopy De Loop	Watchdog	"Tale of a Wolf"
1960	Goliath II	Goliath I / Mouse	
1961	One Hundred and One Dalmatians	Dirty Dawson	Uncredited
1961	Clash and Carry	Wally Walrus	Chilly Willy Short
1962–1972	The Beary Family	Charlie Beary / Junior Beary	
1962	Gay Purr-ee	Meowrice / The Unnamed Cat from the Railway Station	
1962	A Symposium on Popular Songs	Ludwig Von Drake / Ted Lewis	
1963	Stowaway Woody	Captain	Woody Woodpecker Short
1965	Goofy's Freeway Troubles	Narrator	Uncredited; Goofy Short
1965	Sink Pink	Texan Hunter / Native Bearer	Pink Panther Short
1965	Pinkfinger	Narrator	Pink Panther Short
1965	Pink Panzer	Neighbor Harry / The Devil	Pink Panther Short
1966–1967	The Inspector	The Commissioner / Weft / Wong / Captain Clamity / Crab Louie / Captain DuMont, aka "X" / Chicken Butler / Sailor / Spider Pierre / Hassan the Assassin	Fifteen shorts
1966	The Man Called Flintstone	Green Goose / Agent Triple X / Mario / Rock Slag / Ali / Bobo	
1968	Escalation	Lyndon B. Johnson	Uncredited
1979	Rudolph and Frosty's Christmas in July	Jack Frost / Officer Kelly / Winterbolt / Genie of the Ice Scepter / Keeper of the Cave of Lost Rejections	
1982	The Flight of Dragons	Antiquity	Uncredited
1982	The Last Unicorn	Mabruk / Cat / Tree	
1983	Twice Upon a Time	Narrator / Chef of State / Judges in The Pantry of Pomp / Bailiff	
1987	The Puppetoon Movie	Arnie the Dinosaur / Pillsbury Doughboy	Released seven months after Frees's death, the movie itself dedicated to him

==== Television ====
List of voice performances in television shows
Television
Year	Title	Role	Notes
1956	Alfred Hitchcock Presents	Radio Announcer (uncredited)	Season 1 Episode 39: "Momentum"
1956	Alfred Hitchcock Presents	Mary's Father (uncredited)	Season 2 Episode 2: "Fog Closing In"
1956	Alfred Hitchcock Presents	Swanson (uncredited)	Season 2 Episode 3: "De Mortuis"
1957	Alfred Hitchcock Presents	Train Station Announcer (uncredited)	Season 2 Episode 18: "The Manacled"
1958	Alfred Hitchcock Presents	Off-Screen Announcer (uncredited)	Season 4 Episode 4: "The Crooked Road"
1957–1968, 1976	Walt Disney's Wonderful World of Color	Ludwig Von Drake / Narrator / Donald Duck (1 episode) / Moby Duck	18 episodes
1957–1961	The Woody Woodpecker Show	Wally Walrus / Charlie / Doc / Various	
1958–1959	Steve Canyon	Narrator	34 episodes
1959–1964	The Rocky and Bullwinkle Show	Boris Badenov / Inspector Fenwick / Captain Peter "Wrong Way" Peachfuzz / Additional Voices	163 episodes / 326 Segments
1960	Mister Magoo	Various	13 episodes
1960–1962	The Flintstones	Mr. Granite / Rockenschpeel / TV Announcer / Ed Bedrock	Episodes: "The Babysitters", "The Happy Household"
1961	Top Cat	Tony / Additional voices	Episodes: "The Maharajah of Pookajee", "All That Jazz", "The $1,000,000 Derby", "The Con Men", "Dibble's Double"
1961	The Dick Tracy Show	Go-Go Gomez	Uncredited
1961–1962	Calvin and the Colonel	Judge Oliver Wendell Clutch	
1961–1962	The Alvin Show	Additional voices	
1962	Mister Magoo's Christmas Carol	Stage Director / Charity Man / Fezziwig / Old Joe / Undertaker	TV special
1963	Krazy Kat	Ignatz Mouse	
1964–1965	The Famous Adventures of Mr. Magoo	Sherlock Holmes / Various	5 episodes
1961, 1963–1967	Hoppity Hooper	Narrator / Additional voices	52 episodes / 104 Segments
1965	The New Three Stooges	Sarge / Von Vonce / Bomb Maker	Episode: "That Little Old Bomb Maker"
1965	I Dream of Jeannie	Narrator	Episodes: "My Hero?", "Guess What Happened on the Way to the Moon?"
1965–1966	The Atom Ant/Secret Squirrel Show	Squiddly Diddly / Morocco Mole / Double-Q / Yellow Pinkie / Claude Hopper	26 episodes
1965–1967	The Beatles	John Lennon / George Harrison / Brian Epstein / Additional voices	
1966	The Impossibles	Fluid-Man / Professor Stretch / Captain Kid / Puzzler / Infamous Mr. Instant / Artful Archer / Dr. Futuro	26 episodes
1966	Laurel and Hardy	Additional voices	
1966–1967	The Super 6	Dispatcher "Super Chief" / Brother Matzoriley #1 and #3 / Captain Whammo	
1966–1968	Space Ghost	Brago / Zeron	20 episodes
1967	Cricket on the Hearth	Sea Captain / Caw / Others	TV special
1967–1970	George of the Jungle	Ape / Weevil / Baron Otto Matic / Various	17 episodes
1967	Shazzan	Various	6 episodes
1967	The Superman/Aquaman Hour of Adventure	Kobarah / Evil Star	Episodes: "Hawkman: Peril from Pluto", "Green Lantern: Evil Is as Evil Does"
1967–1968	Super President	James Norcross / Narrator	
1967–1968	The Fantastic 4	Ben Grimm / The Thing	20 episodes
1968	The Mouse on the Mayflower	Captain Christopher Jones	TV special
1968	Arabian Knights	Vangore	18 episodes
1968	The Little Drummer Boy	Ali / Aaron's Father / The Three Wise Men / Meshaw / Jamilie / Various other Male roles	TV special
1969–1970	The Pink Panther Show	Man Talking to the Pink Panther / Texan Hunter / The Pink Panther / The Commissioner (1 Episode)	
1969	The Banana Splits Adventure Hour	Evil Vangore / Sazoom	8 episodes
1969	Frosty the Snowman	Santa Claus / Traffic Cop	TV special
1969–1970	The Dudley Do-Right Show	Inspector Fenwick / Narrator / Additional Voices	26 episodes
1970	The Mad, Mad, Mad Comedians	W. C. Fields / Zeppo Marx / Harpo Marx / Traffic Cop	TV special
1970	Santa Claus Is Comin' to Town	Burgermeister Meisterburger / Newsreel Announcer / Grimsley / Topper / Additional Voices / Ebenezer Scrooge / Ringle, Dingle, Zingle, Tingle, & Wingle / Kringle	TV special
1971	Here Comes Peter Cottontail	Santa Claus / Man at Thanksgiving Table / Colonel Bunny's assistant / Fireman / Ben the Rooster	TV special
1971	The Point!	Oblio's Father / Pointed Man's Right Head / King / Leaf Man / Villagers	TV Animated feature; based on the Harry Nilsson album
1971–1972	The Jackson 5ive	The J5's Producer / Additional voices	
1972	The ABC Saturday Superstar Movie	Iguana	"Willie Mays and the Say-Hey Kid"
1972–1973	The Osmonds	Additional voices	
1974–1976	Run, Joe, Run	Narrator	26 episodes
1976	The First Easter Rabbit	Santa Claus / Zero / Spats	TV special
1976	Frosty's Winter Wonderland	Jack Frost / Traffic Cop	TV special
1976	Rudolph's Shiny New Year	Aeon the Terrible / Santa Claus / General Ticker / Humpty Dumpty	TV special
1976	The Pink Panther Laugh-and-a-Half Hour-and-a-Half Show	Additional voices	
1977	The Hobbit	Bombur / Troll #1	TV movie
1977	Nestor, The Long-Eared Christmas Donkey	Olaf / Donkey Dealer	TV special
1977	Fantastic Animation Festival	Opening Narrator	TV special Uncredited
1978	The Stingiest Man in Town	Ghost of Christmas Past / Ghost of Christmas Present	TV special
1979	Jack Frost	Father Winter / Kubla Kraus	TV special
1980	The Return of the King	Elrond / Orc / Uruk-hai / Goblin	TV movie
1986	DTV Valentine	Ludwig Von Drake / Announcer	TV movie
1987	The Wind in the Willows	Wayfarer	Released eight months after Frees's death, although the film was completed in 1983, 3 years before his death.

==== Disney theme parks ====
List of voice performances in theme parks
Theme parks
Year	Title	Role
1964	Great Moments with Mr. Lincoln	Narrator
1967	Adventure Thru Inner Space	Narrator
1967	Pirates of the Caribbean	Pirate Captain, Bride Auctioneer, Pooped Pirate, ghostly voices, various pirates
1969	The Haunted Mansion	Ghost Host

=== Radio ===
List of acting performances in radio series
Radio
Original Air Date	Program	Role	Episode
1945	The Lux Radio Theatre	Multiple Characters	
1945–1947	A Man Named Jordan	Digger Slade	
1946	Rogue's Gallery		
1946	The Whistler		
1946	The Alan Young Show		
1946–1952	Suspense	Announcer / Passerby / Earl White / Frankenstein's Monster / Hubbard	
1947	Ellery Queen		
1947–1948	Escape	Doctor Dubosk / Finnie Morner / John Woolfolk / Sanger Rainsford	Episodes: "The Fourth Man", "Snake Doctor", "Wild Oranges", "The Most Dangerous Game"
1948	Your Movietown Radio Theatre	Multiple Characters	
1948	The First Nighter Program	Additional voices	
1949	The Adventures of Philip Marlowe		
1949	The Green Lama	Jethro Dumont / Green Lama	
1949	Rocky Jordan		
1949	Four Star Playhouse		
1951	The Silent Men		
1951	Mr. Aladdin	Robert Aladdin	
1951	Broadway Is My Beat		
1951	The Thing from Another World	Dr. Voorhees	
1952–1953	Gunsmoke	Sut Grider / Gallagher / Doc Charles Adams (1 episode)	Episodes: "Heat Spell", "The Soldier", "The Cast"
1953	Crime Classics	Charles McManus / Charley Ford / Charles Drew Sr. / Pub Man	Episodes: "The Axe and the Droot Family – How They Fared" "The Death of a Picture Hanger" "The Shrapnelled Body of Charles Drew, Sr."
1953	Mr. President	Additional voices	
1953	On Stage	Chauffeur	Episode: "Skin Deep"
1954	Fibber McGee and Molly		
1956	Yours Truly, Johnny Dollar	Bert Parker	Episode: "The Jolly Roger Fraud" (Part 1)
1957	The CBS Radio Workshop	Captain Vesey / Ogden the Messenger	Episode: "Sweet Cherries in Charleston"
1984	Bradbury 13	Narrator	

=== Commercials ===
List of voice performances in television commercials
Television
Year	Title	Role	Notes
1957–1986	7-Up	Fresh-Up Freddie	
1965–1986	The Pillsbury Company	Pillsbury Doughboy	
1970–1986	Froot Loops	Toucan Sam	
1972–1978	Green Giant	Farmer	
1973-1986	Monster cereals	Boo-Berry	

== Crew work ==
Year	Title	Position	Notes
1955	The Donald O'Connor Show	Writer	Writer (1 episode); Special material (4 episodes)
1960	The Beatniks	Director, executive producer, screenwriter	Uncredited
