= Golden Book Video =

Videos by Western Publishing, 1985–1996

- Industry: Home video
- Founded: 1985; 41 years ago
- Defunct: 1995; 31 years ago (self-distribution); 2001; 25 years ago (company)
- Fate: Distribution unit folded into Sony Wonder; entertainment catalog later purchased by Classic Media
- Successor: Universal Pictures Home Entertainment (back catalog)
- Headquarters: United States
- Area served: United States and Canada

Golden Book Video was a line of animated and live-action videos for children marketed by Western Publishing, which began during the holiday season of 1985. They featured characters and stories from Western's print publications, such as Little Golden Books, and were originally released on VHS video cassette for under $10.

The videos made use of limited animation techniques to add motion to original illustrations from Western's print books; Western called this approach "bringing storybooks to life".

Random House and Classic Media (now DreamWorks Classics) bought out Golden Books Family Entertainment in 2001.

== History ==
In July 1991, Western Publishing acquired Heron Communications' Hi-Tops Video label and 60 of their upcoming titles, including Madeline specials, The Real Story of... and A Bunch of Munsch from CINAR Films and future installments in the Baby Songs series. In 1993, Western Publishing acquired home video rights to the first season of the Madeline TV series and short films created by John Clark Matthews for Churchill Films; Western also commissioned Matthews to produce two new direct-to-video specials for them.

Western Publishing experienced continued financial losses as the 1990s went on, and accumulated $250 million in long-term debt; as a result, Western closed its home video distribution arm in 1995. On May 8, 1996, Western Publishing's shareholders approved the sale of the company to Golden Press Holdings LLC, a company formed by Warburg Pincus and ex-Simon & Schuster executive Richard E. Snyder trading as Golden Books Family Entertainment. Golden Books purchased programming previously owned by General Electric, Alan Enterprises, Wrather Corporation, and Total Television from Broadway Video on July 31.

On December 27, 1997, Golden Books signed an agreement with Sony Wonder to release their programming on video and DVD starting in spring 1998. Family Home Entertainment's rights to the pre-1974 Rankin/Bass Productions holiday specials and Frosty Returns (acquired by Golden Books in the Broadway Video purchase) reverted to Golden Books and Sony Wonder that same year.

On August 16, 2001, Classic Media and Random House agreed to jointly purchase the assets of Golden Books Family Entertainment. Classic acquired Golden Books' entertainment assets and their home entertainment distribution agreement with Sony Wonder, allowing Sony to release other titles managed by Classic Media.

== Products ==
=== Main series ===
- 3 Favorite Golden Stories (1985)
- 3 Best-Loved Golden Stories (1985)
- 3 Richard Scarry Animal Nursery Tales (1985)
- 3 Golden Amye Rosenberg Stories (1985)
- 3 Mercer Mayer Stories (1985)
- 3 Golden Jungle Animal Tales (1985)
- 3 Hugga Bunch Stories (1985)
- 3 Masters of the Universe Stories (1985)
- 3 She-Ra: Princess of Power Stories (1985)
- 3 Sesame Street Stories (1985)
- 4 Masters of the Universe Stories (1985)
- 5 Sesame Street Stories (1985)
- 3 Fairy Tale Classics (1986)
- 3 Golden Bible Stories (1986)
- 3 Tales From the Care Bears (1986)
- 3 Golden Richard Scarry Tales (1986)
- Learn About Living Stories (1986)
- Pound Puppies Adventures (1986)
- Merry Mother Goose (1986)
- 3 Hans Christian Andersen Stories (1986)
- Pound Puppies Stories (1986)
- 3 My Pet Monster Tales (1986)
- 3 Favorite Fairy Tales (1986)
- Pound Puppies Tales (1987)

=== Golden Book Music Video ===
- Sing, Giggle, and Grin (1986)
- See, Sing, and Play (1986)
- A Child's First Nursery Songs (1986)
- Sing, Stretch, & Shape Up (1987)
- Songs from Mother Goose (1987)

=== Golden Step-Ahead Video ===
- Get Ready to Read (1986)
- Get Ready for School (1986)
- Know the Alphabet (1986)
- Get Ready for Math (1986)
- Journey Through the Jungle of Words (1987)
- The Rainy Day Numbers Show (1987)
