= Here Comes Peter Cottontail =

1971 Easter television special

- Official logo
- Based on: "Here Comes Peter Cottontail" by Steve Nelson; Jack Rollins The Easter Bunny That Overslept by Priscilla Friedrich; Otto Friedrich
- Written by: Romeo Muller
- Directed by: Arthur Rankin Jr. Jules Bass
- Voices of: Casey Kasem; Danny Kaye; Vincent Price; Joan Gardner; Paul Frees
- Narrated by: Danny Kaye
- Countries of origin: United States; Japan
- Original language: English

Production
- Producers: Arthur Rankin Jr. Jules Bass
- Cinematography: Kizo Nagashima (Animagic Supervision)
- Editor: Irwin Goldress
- Running time: 51 minutes
- Production company: Rankin/Bass Productions

Original release
- Network: ABC
- Release: April 4, 1971

Related
- The First Easter Rabbit (1976); The Easter Bunny Is Comin' to Town (1977)

Here Comes Peter Cottontail is a 1971 animated Easter television special produced by Rankin/Bass Productions, currently distributed by Universal Television and based on the 1957 novel, The Easter Bunny That Overslept, by Priscilla and Otto Friedrich. The special is narrated by Danny Kaye, and stars Casey Kasem, Vincent Price, Joan Gardner and Paul Frees. The special also features Steve Nelson and Jack Rollins's Easter song, "Here Comes Peter Cottontail".

It was originally broadcast in the United States on April 4, 1971, on the ABC television network. Subsequent airings have appeared on CBS, Fox Family, The CW and Cartoon Network. In 2005, it was followed by a computer-animated sequel Here Comes Peter Cottontail: The Movie.

== Plot ==
Peter Cottontail is a young Easter Bunny who lives in April Valley, where all Easter bunnies live and work, making Easter candy, sewing bonnets, and decorating and delivering Easter eggs.

Colonel Wellington B. Bunny, the retiring Chief Easter Bunny, names Peter as his successor. Peter excitedly claims he “never dreamed” of being the Chief Easter Bunny, but his modest fib (which instinctually lowers his left ear) prompts Colonel Bunny to insist that Peter become more honest and responsible to serve as Chief Easter Bunny.

Meanwhile, a villainous rabbit named January Q. Irontail plots to become Chief Easter Bunny so that he can ruin Easter for children as revenge for a child who once accidentally roller-skated over his tail, forcing him to wear a prosthetic one made of iron. Irontail demands that Colonel Bunny hold a contest to see who delivers the most eggs, according to April Valley's Constitution. Peter accepts the challenge, but stays up late into the night, partying with friends. Although he tells his rooster to wake him up early, Irontail sneaks into his house and feeds the rooster magic bubblegum, sealing his beak. Peter sleeps all day, not hearing the crows from the popping bubbles.

Although Irontail tries all day to deliver his Easter eggs, he only manages to deliver just one. However, because Peter delivered none, Irontail becomes the new Chief Easter Bunny, passing laws to make Easter a disaster, such as painting eggs brown and gray, ordering the candy sculptors to make chocolate tarantulas and octopuses instead of bunnies and chicks, and having Easter galoshes instead of bonnets.

A disgraceful Peter, who was ashamed that his bragging and irresponsibility led to this tragedy, leaves April Valley in tears and vows to make things right. He eventually meets Seymour S. Sassafras, an eccentric peddler and inventor who supplies the colors for April Valley's egg painters from the colored vegetables from his Garden of Surprises. Sassafras lends Peter his Yestermorrowbile, a time machine piloted by a French caterpillar named Antoine, who will take Peter back to Easter to deliver his eggs, win the contest, and defeat Irontail. Irontail learns about Peter's plan, and continues his cheating by sending his spider to sabotage the Yestermorrowbile, allowing Peter and Antoine to go to any holiday but Easter.

Since the contest's rules do not specifically say the eggs must be delivered on Easter, Peter tries to give them away at other holidays, to no avail. On Mother’s Day, he’s turned down outright by a family who didn’t receive eggs earlier. On the 4th of July, Peter paints the eggs red, white and blue, and oversells them to two boys as “firecrackers”, which ultimately fails. On Halloween, Peter meets Madame Esmeralda, a witch, and gives her a Halloween egg as a gift, tying the score. When she calls the other Halloween inhabitants, Irontail sends Montresor, his bat, out to steal Peter's eggs. Peter gets the eggs back and wants to return to Halloween and deliver the eggs to Esmeralda's friends. But Antoine still cannot run the Yestermorrowbile backwards and has to land the craft to fix it.

After failing to give away any of his eggs on Thanksgiving, Peter and Antoine go to Christmas Eve, at which Peter, dressed as Santa Claus, tries to give eggs on the streets, which are deserted. Peter hears sobbing from a hat shop, and meets Bonnie, an Easter bonnet who left April Valley years ago. Bonnie is sad that nobody wants to buy her, so Peter tells the shopkeeper that he will trade his Christmas eggs for Bonnie. However, Irontail steals them again. Peter and Bonnie go after him, accidentally leaving Antoine behind.

During the chase, Irontail and Montresor crash into Santa's sleigh. Santa returns the eggs to Peter, who cannot stop the Yestermorrowbile and is too sad to thank him since leaving Antoine behind. After missing New Year's Day, Peter and Bonnie find the stop button and land on Valentine's Day. There, Peter meets a bunny named Donna, who saw a newspaper article mentioning his oversleeping, but shows compassion regardless. A touched Peter gives her a Valentine egg, which she leaves by Peter’s basket as they go ice skating. However, Irontail finds the eggs again and casts a spell on them, turning them all green, inside and out.

After failing to give away the green eggs on Presidents' Day, Peter laments his original mistakes, but vows to be more honest and responsible from now on. He and Bonnie land on St. Patrick's Day, which gives Peter another chance to give away his eggs. In the end, Peter is successful and wins the contest, becoming the Chief Easter Bunny, Antoine returns as a butterfly, and Irontail works as the janitor of April Valley while Peter leads a parade.

== Cast ==
An original advertisement for the television special.

The special featured the following cast members:

Actor/Actress	Role
Casey Kasem	Peter Cottontail
Danny Kaye	Seymour S. Sassafras, Colonel Wellington B. Bunny, Antoine
Vincent Price	January Q. Irontail
Joan Gardner	Mom (on Mother's Day and at Thanksgiving table), Sue, Madame Esmeralda, Bonnie, Hat shop owner, Martha Washington
Paul Frees	Colonel Bunny’s assistant, Father at Thanksgiving table, Santa Claus, Firefighter, Rooster
Iris Rainer	Donna
Greg Thomas	Tommy, Boy 1 (Independence Day)
Jeff Thomas	Boy 2 (Independence Day)

== Soundtrack ==
Although not commercially released, a soundtrack album for the special was released for demonstration and promotional purposes by ABC.

1. Here Comes Peter Cottontail – Seymour S. Sassafrass
2. The Easter Bunny Never Sleeps – Colonel Wellington B. Bunny, Chorus
3. The Easter Bunny Always Sleeps (Irontail's reprise; the diabolical version of The Easter Bunny Never Sleeps) – Irontail
4. If I Could Only Get Back to Yesterday – Seymour S. Sassafrass, Chorus
5. When You Can't Get It All Together, Improvise – Antoine, Peter Cottontail, Chorus
6. Be Mine Today – Peter Cottontail, Donna, Chorus
7. In The Puzzle of Life – Seymour S. Sassafrass, Chorus
8. Here Comes Peter Cottontail (reprise) – Seymour S. Sassafrass, Chorus

Despite the acclaim, such as TV Guide's comment that the special had "one of the best scores in children's special history", no original soundtrack album was ever released commercially. ABC and Rankin/Bass did produce a private promotional vinyl LP of the entire soundtrack recording in 1971, but no record company has released an official, legitimate audio version to date.

== Crew ==
- Producers/Directors – Jules Bass, Arthur Rankin, Jr.
- Teleplay – Romeo Muller
- Music and Lyrics – Jules Bass, Maury Laws
- Based on "Here Comes Peter Cottontail" – Steve Nelson/Jack Rollins © 1949 Hill & Range Songs, Inc.
- Based on "The Easter Bunny That Overslept" – Priscilla and Otto Friedrich © 1957 Lothrop, Lee & Shepard Company
  - Illustration – Adrienne Adams
- Character Design – Paul Coker, Jr.
- Continuity Design – Steve Nakagawa
- Editorial Supervisor – Irwin Goldress
- Sound and Effects Recording – John Boyd, Jim Harris
- "Animagic" Supervision – Kizo Nagashima
- Character Model Sculptor – Ichiro Komuro (uncredited)
- Animators – Yutaka Mikome (uncredited), Takeo Nakamura, Hiroshi Tabata
- Musical Director – Maury Laws

== Home media ==
On video, the special has seen multiple releases in various formats. In 1990, 1992, 1993, 1998 and 2002, it was released on VHS by Family Home Entertainment and Sony Wonder. It has also seen the following releases on DVD:

- February 12, 2002 (Sony Wonder)
- February 15, 2005 (Sony Wonder)
- February 10, 2009 (Genius Products)
- February 18, 2014 (DreamWorks Animation)

A Blu-ray was released by Universal Pictures Home Entertainment on February 22, 2019, as a Walmart exclusive, containing a version edited for syndication that runs nearly ten minutes shorter.

== Sequel ==
The sequel Here Comes Peter Cottontail: The Movie was released in 2005. The film stars Tom Kenny as Peter Cottontail, Peter's son Junior and Antoine, Christopher Lloyd as Mr. Sassafras, Roger Moore as Irontail, Miranda Cosgrove as Munch the Mouse, Molly Shannon as Jackie Frost, and Kenan Thompson as Flutter.

== See also ==
- The First Easter Rabbit (1976 Rankin-Bass traditional animated special)
- The Easter Bunny Is Comin' to Town (1977 Rankin-Bass stop-motion special)
- List of animated feature films
- List of stop-motion films
