= Sony Pictures Kids Zone =

Kids and family entertainment label

- Logo used since 2020
- Formerly: Sony Kids' Music and Video (1992–1993); Sony Wonder (1993–2023); Sony Pictures Family Fun (2015–2020)
- Type: Subsidiary
- Industry: Entertainment
- Founded: February 1992; 34 years ago
- Founder: Linda Morgenstern
- Headquarters: New York City, New York, United States
- Products: Family films
- Parent: Sony Music Entertainment (1992–2004); Sony BMG Music Entertainment (2004–2007); Sony Pictures Home Entertainment (2007–present)
- Website: kidszone.sonypictures.com

Sony Pictures Kids Zone is the kids and family entertainment label of Sony Pictures Home Entertainment and the former record label owned by Sony Music Entertainment.

Despite the similarity in name, Sony Wonder is not directly related to the former Sony Wonder Technology Lab, an interactive technology and entertainment museum, although the museum was also owned by Sony.

== History ==
=== Under Sony Music ===
Sony Music Video launched its Sony Kids' Music and Sony Kids' Video labels in February 1992 after months of planning under the banner SMV Children's Library. Artists signed to Sony Kids' Music at launch included Dan Crow, Tom Chapin, Tom Paxton, Kevin Roth, Rory, and Lois Young, who would all release product in the spring. After Sony Music Video dissolved in October, Sony Kids' Music and Video were coordinated and marketed through Epic Records beginning in January 1993. In April 1993, Nickelodeon signed a long-term agreement with Sony Music to distribute home video and audio titles.

In June 1993, Sony Kids' Music and Video were merged as Sony Wonder; Sony Wonder's president Ted Green sought new strategic alliances like their one with Nickelodeon. On April 24, 1995, Children's Television Workshop entered a long-term agreement to distribute Sesame Street videos, music, and books through Sony Wonder, while Columbia Pictures began development on two Muppet films which would be released on video by Columbia TriStar Home Video. Sony Wonder also took over distribution of Random House Home Video titles in April.

On July 25, Nickelodeon and Sony Wonder officially launched the Nick Jr. Video line with three titles, one each based on Eureeka's Castle, Gullah Gullah Island, and Allegra's Window; an audio line eventually launched on March 26, 1996. In June 1996, roughly a couple years after Viacom's acquisition of Paramount Communications, Sony Wonder's deal with Nickelodeon was terminated. Subsequently, Paramount Home Entertainment became the main home video distributor for Nickelodeon and Nick Jr.

On August 2, 1997, Sony Wonder entered a long-term worldwide joint venture with Together Again Video Productions to create and distribute new and previous Kidsongs titles, starting with 20 new episodes of The Kidsongs Television Show. On December 27, Sony Wonder and Golden Books Family Entertainment agreed to release titles from Golden Books' catalog starting in spring 1998; the contract continued with Classic Media after they acquired Golden Books.

The company was also the Canadian home video distributor for series produced by CINAR, such as Arthur, Wimzie's House, Madeline, A Bunch of Munsch, The Busy World of Richard Scarry, and Caillou.

On May 4, 1998, Sony Wonder bought Sunbow Entertainment, which had produced various shows based on Hasbro's toy lines but whose original programming had mostly under-performed. On March 1, 2000, Sony Wonder signed a first-look distribution agreement with German-based management firm TV-Loonland AG to handle the distribution of their shows in German-speaking and Eastern European territories and eventually signed a UK home video deal with Maverick. On October 3, as an extension to the previous agreement, TV-Loonland purchased the television assets of Sony Wonder, including its programming and ownership in Sunbow. As part of the deal, Sony kept the North American home video and international audio rights to its library. On May 14, 2008, Hasbro acquired the Sunbow programs based on its properties, which are now part of Hasbro Entertainment. In 2009, TV-Loonland filed for bankruptcy. In 2011, Loonland sold its catalogue to m4e AG. In February 2017, Studio 100 acquired a majority stake in m4e AG, becoming the current owner of television rights to most of the Loonland catalogue, including the Sunbow and Sony Wonder titles.

==== Closure ====
From the end of 2006 to 2007, Sony Wonder began losing distribution agreements. The first company to revoke their deal with Sony Wonder was World Wrestling Entertainment, who signed with Genius Products in October 2006. In January 2007, Sony Wonder had also lost their long-time distribution agreement deal with Classic Media to Genius, and this was followed with Sesame Workshop also signing with Genius in February 2007. Shortly after in March, Shout! Factory announced they would also end their agreement with Sony Wonder and signed a new deal with Vivendi Visual Entertainment.

With the loss of these agreements, Sony BMG Music Entertainment announced that it would shut down Sony Wonder to focus on its core music business. The last two releases under the Sony Wonder label were the 20th Anniversary Edition of The Transformers: The Movie and A Sesame Street Christmas Carol, which were released in November 2006.

=== Under Sony Pictures ===
On June 20, 2007, Sony Pictures Home Entertainment announced that it would revive the Sony Wonder brand as its kids and family entertainment subdivision. The company announced that properties that would be released under Sony Wonder would include The Berenstain Bears, Dragon Tales, Harold and the Purple Crayon, Holly Hobbie & Friends, It's a Big Big World and Stuart Little: The Animated Series.

In 2015, the Sony Wonder label was rebranded as Sony Pictures Family Fun, which was eventually folded into Sony Pictures Kids Zone in 2020. The Sony Wonder label was still used for the direct-to-video The Swan Princess film series until 2023.
