= Rudolph's Shiny New Year =

American-Japanese 1976 animated TV special

- Title card
- Written by: Romeo Muller
- Directed by: Jules Bass; Arthur Rankin Jr.
- Voices of: Billie Mae Richards; Red Skelton; Morey Amsterdam; Frank Gorshin; Paul Frees; Don Messick; Harold Peary
- Narrated by: Red Skelton
- Theme music composer: Johnny Marks
- Composers: Johnny Marks; Maury Laws
- Countries of origin: United States; Japan
- Original languages: English; Japanese

Production
- Producers: Jules Bass; Arthur Rankin Jr.
- Cinematography: Akikazu Kono; Ichiro Komuro
- Running time: 50 minutes
- Production company: Rankin/Bass Productions

Original release
- Network: ABC
- Release: December 10, 1976

Related
- Rudolph the Red-Nosed Reindeer (1964); Rudolph and Frosty's Christmas in July (1979)

Rudolph's Shiny New Year is a 1976 Christmas and New Year's stop motion animated television special and a standalone sequel to the 1964 special Rudolph the Red-Nosed Reindeer produced by Rankin/Bass Productions. The special premiered on ABC on December 10, 1976.

== Plot ==
Santa Claus receives a letter from his friend Father Time asking for help to find Happy the Baby New Year before midnight on New Year's Eve or it will be December 31, permanently. Santa sends Rudolph out to find him due to the snowstorm currently happening outside. A gigantic vulture named Eon the Terrible is supposed to live for only one eon, after which he will turn into ice and snow and disintegrate. As this particular eon will end January 1 of the New Year, he plans to kidnap Happy to keep the year from ending and stop time, thus preventing his predestined death.

General Ticker, a military clock, and the great Quarter-Past-Five, (or Quart for short), a camel with a clock in his hump, bring Rudolph to Father Time's castle beyond the Sands of Time. Father Time speculates that Happy, who ran away due to his large ears being laughed at when they were first seen by Nanny Nine O'Clock, is hiding out in the "Archipelago of Last Years" where the Old Years retire and rule over an island styled to resemble the year over which they ruled. When Rudolph is attacked by Eon on the ocean while heading to the archipelago, he is saved by a whale named Big Ben, who transports Rudolph across the ocean.

Upon arrival in the archipelago, Rudolph first travels to the island belonging to a caveman named One Million B.C., or "O.M." for short. O.M. inhabits an island anachronistically inhabited with dinosaurs and other prehistoric creatures. As Rudolph and O.M. search for Happy, who left after his hat fell off while saving a baby Pterodactyl and revealed his ears, they repeatedly encounter Eon.

After other off-screen visits to the islands of 4000 B.C., 1492, 1893, and 1965 have been completed without success, Rudolph and O.M. head for the island of 1023 (pronounced "ten to three," as in the time 2:50), which is ruled by a long-bearded Scottish knight named Sir 1023, whose island is filled with medieval trappings along with several fairy tale and Mother Goose characters. Meanwhile, Happy befriends the Three Bears, but becomes upset when he is forced to remove his hat while playing a game with Baby Bear and exposes his ears to them, causing him to leave again.

The group then travels to the island of 1776, which reflects Colonial America and is ruled over by 1776 (or "Sev" for short), who resembles Benjamin Franklin. After Happy's apparent rejection following the daily Independence Day parade, Eon kidnaps him and takes him to his lair on the Island of No-Name which is said to be located "due north of the North Pole".

The group leaves the archipelago in pursuit of Eon, and attempt to rescue Happy. However, upon being awakened by the sound of O.M. tumbling, Eon thwarts them by sending an avalanche down on the group and trapping them inside giant snowballs. Managing to break himself free using his nose, Rudolph climbs up to Eon's nest where he finds Happy, who refuses to leave. Rudolph shows Happy his nose and tells him his own story of being bullied because of his nonconformity before he asks Happy to let him see his ears. Happy does so, and Rudolph, like everyone else before him, laughs at the sight. Happy once again gets upset, but Rudolph explains that the sight of his ears had made him feel so wonderful that he had to laugh, just like it had done with everyone else. With this declaration, Happy shouts out with joy, but causes Eon to awaken. Rudolph quickly tells Happy to take off his hat and leave it off for good. At the sight of Happy's large ears, Eon bursts into uncontrollable laughter which sends him tumbling down the side of the mountain and into the remaining snowballs, freeing O.M., 1023, and Sev. Rudolph realizes that Eon is now filled with warmth and happiness that it is impossible for him to turn to ice and snow.

Santa arrives and the gang returns to Father Time's castle with Happy before the New Year, which is designated "19-Wonderful".

== Archipelago of Last Years ==
Map of the Archipelago of Last Years

When the old year has been retired, they settle on an island in the Archipelago of Last Years where time remains still on that island. Among the islands of the Archipelago of Last Years are:

- 1,000,000 B.C. Island: Represented as a prehistoric, anachronistic island that consists of friendly dinosaurs, other prehistoric creatures, and cavepeople living together. One Million, also known as "O.M.", lives here.
- 4,000 B.C. Island: Rudolph mentions that its inhabitants wanted to only build pyramids. This would be in real life approximately one millennium before the first Nile River valley pyramid known as Adjib's Tomb was built.
- 1023 Island: Represented as a medieval island inhabited by fairy tale characters. Father Time states that the year of 1023 was when all the well-known fairy tales and nursery rhymes actually happened. Sir 1023, also known as "Ten-to-Three", lives here.
- 1492 Island: Rudolph mentions that the people on that island were "too busy discovering things" to talk to Rudolph and O.M. The first voyage of Christopher Columbus took place that year.
- 1776 Island: Represented as a Colonial American island that celebrates American Independence Day on a daily basis. 1776, also known as "Sev", lives here.
- 1893 Island: Rudolph mentions that the inhabitants have never heard of Happy. 1893 marked the beginning of a major economic depression in the Western Hemisphere known as the Panic of 1893.
- 1965 Island: Rudolph stated that island was "too noisy" to search for Happy. "Noisy" world events of 1965 included Beatlemania (and other British Invasion-related hysteria) as well as the growing opposition to United States involvement in the Vietnam War.

== Cast ==
An original advertisement for the special.

- Red Skelton as:
  - Father Time (Narrator)
  - Baby Bear
- Billie Mae Richards as Rudolph
- Morey Amsterdam as One Million BC (O.M.)
- Frank Gorshin as Sir 1023
- Paul Frees as:
  - 1776 ("Sev")
  - Santa Claus
  - General Ticker
  - Eon the Terrible
  - Humpty Dumpty
  - The Great Quarter Past Five ("Quart")
- Don Messick as:
  - Papa Bear
  - Rumpelstiltskin
  - Prince Charming
  - Seven Dwarfs
- Harold Peary as Big Ben the Whale
- Iris Rainer as:
  - Mama Bear
  - Nanny Nine O'Clock
  - Happy the Baby New Year

== Songs ==
- "The Moving Finger Writes"
- "Turn Back the Years"
- "It's Raining Sunshine"
- "What a Wonderful World We Live In"
- "Fourth of July Parade"
- "Have a Little Faith in Me"
- "Rudolph the Red-Nosed Reindeer"
- "Have a Happy New Year"

== Production ==
The special was filmed in 1975 (according to the copyright), but it was shown on ABC on December 10, 1976.

For the special, Rudolph was given a redesign by Paul Coker, Jr.

== Television rights ==
The rights to this special are held by Warner Bros. Domestic Television Distribution, which used to license the show to The Walt Disney Company; Disney carried the special on Freeform annually during its 25 Days of Christmas marathon (and occasionally aired it over-the-air on ABC). Since 2018, Warner Bros. has licensed the special to AMC and its sister channels for the Best Christmas Ever block.

== Home media ==
Rudolph's Shiny New Year was first released on VHS by Warner Home Video in 1992. It was also re-released on VHS in 1999, and for the first time on DVD alongside The Year Without a Santa Claus, on October 31, 2000. The special, along with other Rankin/Bass Christmas specials and Chuck Jones's animated TV adaptation of Dr. Seuss' How the Grinch Stole Christmas!, was bundled in Warner's Christmas Television Favorites DVD box set, released on October 2, 2007. On October 7, 2008, these same titles were released in another holiday-themed DVD set, Classic Christmas Favorites. Warner Home Video released seven different original Rankin/Bass holiday classics along with Dr. Seuss' How the Grinch Stole Christmas! on the third DVD box set, Santa's Magical Stories, released on October 4, 2011. A Miser Brothers' Christmas, a sequel to the 1974 special, The Year Without a Santa Claus, is also included.

== See also ==
- List of Christmas television specials
- List of Christmas films
- List of Rankin/Bass Productions films
- Santa Claus in film
