= A Miser Brothers' Christmas =

2008 TV special

- Official poster
- Based on: The Year Without a Santa Claus
- Screenplay by: Eddie Guzelian
- Directed by: Dave Barton Thomas
- Voices of: Mickey Rooney; George S. Irving; Juan Chioran
- Composer: William Kevin Anderson
- Countries of origin: United States; Canada
- Original language: English

Production
- Producers: Tedd Anasti; Patsy Cameron-Anasti; Adam Shaheen
- Editors: Kevan Byrne; Jason Pichonski; Mark Westberg
- Running time: 44 minutes
- Production companies: Warner Premiere; Warner Bros. Animation; Cuppa Coffee Studios

Original release
- Network: ABC Family
- Release: December 13, 2008

Related
- The Year Without a Santa Claus (1974)

A Miser Brothers' Christmas is a 2008 Christmas stop motion special that is also a spin-off of the 1974 Rankin/Bass special The Year Without a Santa Claus. Santa Claus, while riding on a sleigh designed by elf Tinsel, has his back injured as a result of a malfunction. Mother Nature blames it on the continuously-feuding titular brothers, Heat and Snow, placing them in charge of the toy factory as a consequence. Their ability to co-operate, as well as the fate of Christmas, are challenged by their inherent character flaws and evil schemes by the North Wind, who, out of lust for glory, tries to eliminate Santa and replace him in his position.

The animation was by Toronto-based Cuppa Coffee Studios, attempting to replicate the Rankin/Bass aesthetic of the original. Mickey Rooney and George S. Irving reprise their respective roles as Santa Claus and Heat Miser.

A Miser Brothers' Christmas was distributed by Warner Bros. Animation under their Warner Premiere label (the rights holder of the post-1974 Rankin/Bass library). The special premiered on ABC Family on December 13, 2008, during the network's annual programming event The 25 Days of Christmas. It garnered 3.7 million viewers in its first airing and was nominated for an Annie Award for "Best Animated Television Production Produced for Children". Reviews from critics were mixed, with acclaim given to the animation and the performances of Irving and Rooney, but criticism aimed towards the writing and songs.

== Plot ==
As another Christmas approaches, the North Wind plans to eliminate Santa Claus to replace him and take over the holiday. Santa Claus takes a test ride on the brand-new Super Sleigh, built by the elf Tinsel. The North Wind sends two of his minions to unbolt it during the ride. This causes the sleigh to fall in the middle of a feud between the continuously-feuding Miser Brothers, Heat and Snow, as he unintentionally crosses into their domain. This causes Mrs. Claus and, in turn, the Miser Brothers and North Wind's mother, Mother Nature, to believe the brothers are responsible. Dr. Noel diagnoses Santa with a back injury, estimating that it will take two-to-three weeks of rest for him to fully recover, well after Christmas.

In the hopes of getting the Misers to work together, Mother Nature assigns them managers of the toy factory. Hiring their own respective minions to produce the toys, the two factions battle with each other, calling Mrs. Claus to action to resolve. Mrs. Claus reveals to the brothers their long history of being on the naughty list for mutual bickering, which began when they were infants, all the while singing about the importance of sibling bonding. The brothers learn from this and begin collaborating, bringing the factory up to speed.

On Christmas Eve, the North Wind's minions surreptitiously attach heating and cooling units to the sleigh, apparently capable of heating or cooling entire regions of the planet. This discovery creates another feud between the Miser Brothers. Santa has no choice but to drive the sleigh as the North Wind planned. However, as he leaves, Tinsel discovers the Super Sleigh has been sabotaged. The Miser Brothers learn of the North Wind's scheme after finding one of his Christmas cards with him dressed as Santa. Heat, Snow, Tinsel, and a team of young reindeer barely rescue Santa from a vortex whipped up by the North Wind. Mother Nature, as punishment, sentences North Wind to do household chores at her house for the next several thousand years. The brothers, making the nice list, deliver the presents for Santa and exchange gifts to each other in the process, as the elves sing "It's Christmas Time!" again.

== Cast ==
- Mickey Rooney as Santa Claus, the bringer of toys every Christmas who once again, as a result of a back injury, has to rest during a time when he supposed to be flying across the world bringing good kids their presents. This is the last Christmas special to feature Rooney, who died in 2014, as Santa Claus.
- George S. Irving as Heat Miser, self-proclaimed "Mr. Sun", "Mr. Green Christmas" and "Mr. 101". This was Irving's last full-length screen role before he died in 2016. (Note: His last screen credit overall was a short film, 37 (2013), written and directed by Puk Grasten.)
- Juan Chioran as Snow Miser, self-proclaimed "Mr. Snow", "Mr. White Christmas" and "Mr. 10 Below". The Canadian actor replaced Dick Shawn who died in 1987. Chioran also voices all of his minions, who are called "Flakes" in the credits.
- Catherine Disher as Mrs. Claus, wife of Santa Claus who helps the Miser brothers in their relationship with each other to save Christmas. Catherine Disher replaced Shirley Booth, who died in 1992, in the role. Disher also plays an unnamed Reindeer Elf.
- Patricia Hamilton as Mother Nature, the sweet but stern mother of Heat Miser, Snow Miser, and the North Wind who punishes the Misers by making them work at the toy factory after their perceived injuring of Santa Claus. Hamilton replaced Rhoda Mann in the role.
- Brad Adamson as the North Wind, the charming son of Mother Nature who has a trusting relationship with her but has ulterior motives in overthrowing Santa.
- Peter Oldring as Bob, an assistant elf who reports on percentages of toy production at the factory to Santa, Mrs. Claus and the Miser brothers. Oldring also voices other unnamed elves.
- Susan Roman as Tinsel, historically the youngest mechanical elf in the history of Santa's toy shop who builds the Super Sleigh used for delivering the presents, and Dr. Noel, a nurse elf who takes care of Santa following the sleigh fall. Roman also voices various other extras.

Jingle and Jangle, two elves that appeared in A Year Without a Santa Claus, are absent in A Miser Brothers' Christmas.

== Songs ==
- "It's Christmas Time!"
- "No Santa! Just Me!"
- "Heat Miser"/"Snow Miser"
- "Brothers Should Be Friends"
- "Heat Miser"/"Snow Miser" (reprise)
- "It's Christmas Time!" (reprise)

== Background ==
The Miser Brothers, who first appeared in The Year Without a Santa Claus (1974), are another set of characters that maintained pop culture relevance despite not being the main stars of the media they appeared in, as with Boba Fett and Shrek's Gingerbread Man. For Joe Corey, their "amazing theme songs" and battles were the reason audiences remembered the special.

Beginning with Rudolph the Red-Nosed Reindeer: The Movie (1998), several remakes, spin-offs and sequels based on Rankin/Bass holiday specials were produced by unrelated companies, replacing stop-motion animation in favor of live-action filming or digital animation. In 2006, NBC aired a live-action remake of The Year Without a Santa Claus (1974). A Miser Brothers Christmas bucked these aspects via being produced by Warner Brothers, owner of most of the Rankin/Bass catalog, with stop-motion animation.

A Miser Brothers Christmas was also produced and aired during an era of newly-made Christmas specials losing relevance the following season, while certain 1960s and 1970s productions like A Charlie Brown Christmas (1965), How the Grinch Stole Christmas! (1966), and Rankin/Bass specials Frosty the Snowman (1969) and Rudolph the Red-Nosed Reindeer (1964) maintained strong ratings, "defying the shelf-life laws of pop culture". Dave Barton Thomas, who directed A Miser Brothers' Christmas, described it as a difficult-to-enter "inner circle".

== Reception ==
I basically bullied my way into reviewing this, insisting to co-workers that the genius of the source material (The Year Without a Santa Claus) made it a worthy addition to the magazine. Just another example, kids, of how bullying never pays. This new spin-off special—featuring dueling brothers Heat Miser and Snow Miser—is neither hot nor cool.

— Dalton Ross, who graded A Miser Brothers' Christmas a C− in an Entertainment Weekly review

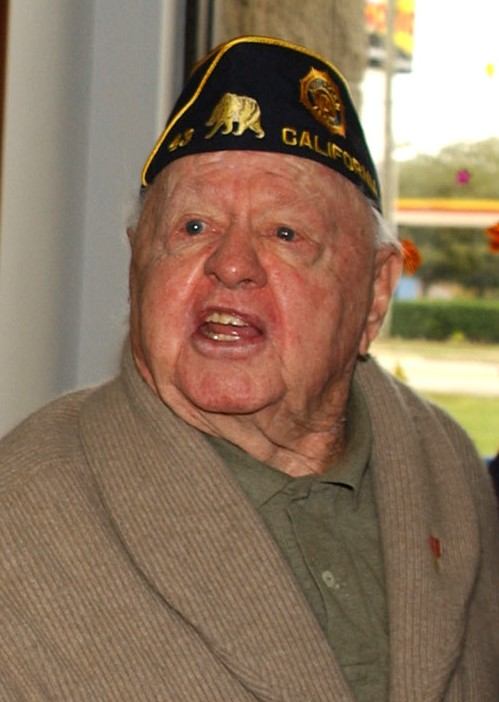
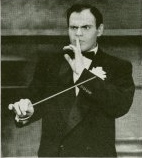
The reprisal of Mickey Rooney (left) and George S. Irving (right) was well-received even by negative reviewers of the special.

Per Nielsen ratings, A Miser Brothers Christmas was viewed by 3.7 million individuals in its first airing. This placed it fourth among Christmas specials, below a debut airing of Hallmark's The Most Wonderful Time of the Year (4 million) and re-runs of Frosty the Snowman (1969) on CBS (7 million) and A Charlie Brown Christmas (1965) on ABC (11 million). The special received a nomination for "Best Animated Television Production Produced for Children" in the 36th Annual Annie Awards.

A Miser Brothers' Christmas received mixed reviews from critics upon release. Corey, reviewing for Inside Pulse, concluded it was one of the better Christmas special revivals and would be great for children wanting to see more of the Miser brothers' antics. DVDTalk reviewer Stuart Galbraith IV also recommended it to children as well as nostalgic older generations. Less celebratory, Colin Jacobson of DVD Movie Guide opined it "doesn't totally bomb, but it's never particularly enjoyable", and Luke Bonanno called it "not very good". Karl Croop of Common Sense Media concluded that it worked as a bit of holiday television but would not achieve the classic status of A Year Without a Santa Claus. At worse, the special met CliqueClack writer Bill White's dread of expectations he had a day before viewing. He was irritated by corporate executives continuing to attempt to "suckle the teat of nostalgic baby-boomers, with terrible results", citing constant reappearances of Bugs Bunny as an example. In later years, A Miser Brothers' Christmas made various top-ten lists of best Christmas specials. Joe Allen of Digital Trends placed it on his list of the seven best claymation Christmas specials in 2023. On the same kind of list by Screen Rant's Dalton Norman in the same year, the special came in at number nine. Wes Burton, for Comic Book Resources, ranked it the fourth-best "lesser-known" Christmas special in 2022.

Many critics were delighted by the reprisal of "Snow Miser"/"Heat Miser" from the predecessor. The story and new songs, however, were the most condemned aspects and frequently dismissed as forgettable. Some found its plot convoluted. Corey dismissed the instrumentation as sounding like a synthesized rough track. The songs and story did have supporters, however. Video Librarian's J. Williams-Wood summarized the special was filled with "buoyant tunes and an amiable lesson about cooperation", while Burton found it "entertaining and humorous" with "clever writing and wacky humor". Allen also appreciated the special's presentation of the brothers' influence being more "global" than the previous special, and found the overall story relevant to the issue of climate change.

Jacobson opined A Miser Brothers' Christmas was another example of the varying qualities of media with sidekicks as the most important characters, naming The Lion King 1½ (2004) and Kronk's New Groove (2005) as others. Rodney Figueiredo of Animated Views suggested the charisma and interaction of the brothers made for a fun Christmas special, despite the story being "standard Christmas fare with a message about brotherly love and family". Corey and Galbraith IV positively noted the brothers' new types of confrontations, and the latter wrote "their eventual reconciliation is almost touching". Croop, on the other hand, suggested children not aware of The Year Without Santa Claus would not care about the Misers while watching A Misers' Brother Christmas, and their bickering would get old quickly. Bonanno elaborated this repetitiveness was aggravated by the show's erratic, "busy and noisy" pace and tone. The new characters, such as the North Wind and Tinsel, were given some compliments. Croop praised the North Wind as a "devilish" mix of Gaston and Stephen Colbert, while Galbraith IV compared Adamson's performance of the character to Kelsey Grammer for Sideshow Bob. The inclusion of a industrious female elf was seen as a positive role model.

Even for detractors, the reprisal of Irving and Rooney was a source of excitement, surprise, and enjoyment. Chioran's performance as Snow Miser, on the other hand, was not well-received. Jacobson felt he "overacts relentlessly and can't carry the role in a satisfying way", and White wrote his "shrieking line readings had you praying Snowy would eventually be struck mute". Cuppa Coffee's animation was another acclaimed aspect. Galbraith IV labeled it "flawless", a polished version of the Rankin/Bass style with "lavish and attractive" sets, "excellent" photography and lighting, and CGI backgrounds and weather effects that add to the antique stop motion. Figueiredo and Rob Owen, reviewing for Pittsburgh Post-Gazette, also praised the capturing of the Rankin/Bass vibe. Contrarily, reviewers like Bonanno and Robert Lloyd of the Los Angeles Times, acknowledging the increase in quality, missed the "ragtag magic" and "jerky, offbeat charm" of Rankin/Bass' animation. Bonanno and White were also critical of new designs of the previously-established characters.

== See also ==
- Santa Claus in film
- List of Christmas films
