= All I Watch for Christmas =

American Christmas television programming block

All I Watch for Christmas and Christmas Maximus are two interrelated program blocks respectively carried on TBS and TNT, the two former flagship stations of the Turner Broadcasting System.. In recent years, the block has been extended to sister network HGTV.

The blocks feature seasonal Christmas television specials and films in November and December, most of which are from the archives of Warner Bros. Discovery (its most recent owner prior to the company's sale and subsumption into Skydance Corporation in 2026) and which are concurrently licensed out to competing cable networks' blocks, such as AMC's Best Christmas Ever and Freeform's 25 Days of Christmas.

== History ==
TBS and TNT had long carried Christmas specials, particularly with the purchase of the Metro-Goldwyn-Mayer library in 1986. In 1989, TNT became the exclusive broadcaster of the original animated version of How the Grinch Stole Christmas! It also built a tradition of airing the 1983 film A Christmas Story beginning in 1987, eventually expanding over time to become a full-day marathon by 1997. The Wizard of Oz, a holiday tradition on television since its 1950s golden age, moved to TBS in 1999.

Other programs in the Warner Bros. library were licensed out to other channels. Through 2017, a package of films such as Elf, National Lampoon's Christmas Vacation, The Polar Express and the 1974–1987 library of cel-animated and stop-motion "Animagic" Christmas specials from Rankin/Bass Productions were licensed to what was then ABC Family for its 25 Days of Christmas, where the films were major ratings draws. In 2018, Warner Bros.' parent company entered into a licensing deal with AMC to move those programs to that network, and out of the 25 Days of Christmas. The Christmas specials from the Hanna-Barbera library were aired on sister channel Boomerang until 2024, when they became a centerpiece of MeTV Toons's holiday programming.

Over time, TBS and TNT began airing that library on its own channels in addition to continuing to make them available to AMC. (A Christmas Story remained exclusive to TNT and TBS, while the Grinch animated special has been licensed out to NBC since 2015, with TBS and TNT also showing the special.)

In 2021, TBS and TNT introduced the Winter Break branding as part of their holiday programming slate for that year. During this, TBS' Winter Break branding that year was hosted by Carla, an abominable "snowmonster" voiced by Amy Sedaris, and later, a group of greeting cards on top of an firehouse mantel on 2023, and continued after the rebranding of "All I Watch for Christmas".

The "Christmas Maximus" and "All I Watch for Christmas" block names were introduced in 2024. With the new brand, several of the films will also be featured in TNT's revival of Dinner and a Movie.

In 2025, Warner Bros. Discovery expanded the programming to HGTV, whose holiday programming up until then had consisted only of unofficial coverage of the Rose Parade. The introduction of the film library (which included A Christmas Story, Elf and Candy Cane Lane) drew harsh backlash from the network's viewers for not fitting HGTV's format, and was done in large part due to fill programming holes caused by a major cutback in original programming on the network over the previous year.

In 2026, TNT and TBS came under the ownership of Skydance Corporation. Initial press releases identified TNT's holiday programming brand for that year as the Holiday Movie Marathon, though a later press release indicated that the "All I Watch for Christmas" and "Christmas Maximus" brands would be returning. The lineup will expand the marathon approach it uses for A Christmas Story on Christmas to Thanksgiving weekend with 24-hour marathons of Elf and Christmas Vacation, along with marathons of non-holiday movies on the networks in the same time span, and revive its 1999 version of A Christmas Carol in honor of its recently deceased star Patrick Stewart.

== Programming ==
Films marked † are sublicensed to AMC in addition to their TNT/TBS telecasts; other sublicensees are in ⟨angle brackets⟩. As of 2026:

=== Specials ===
- How the Grinch Stole Christmas! ⟨NBC⟩
- The Year Without a Santa Claus†

=== Films ===
- A Christmas Carol (1999)
- Candy Cane Lane
- Elf†
- Four Christmases†
- Fred Claus†
- Miracle on 34th Street (1947)
- Miracle on 34th Street (1994) ⟨Freeform⟩
- National Lampoon's Christmas Vacation†
- The Polar Express†
- Red One
- The Wizard of Oz (1939) ⟨MeTV, The CW⟩

==== Film franchises ====
- Parker Family Saga (A Christmas Story† and A Christmas Story Christmas, including traditional Christmas Day marathon)
- Willy Wonka (Willy Wonka and the Chocolate Factory, Charlie and the Chocolate Factory, Wonka)

=== Sports ===
- College Football Playoff quarterfinal rounds
- NHL Winter Classic
