= Khouth =

Khouth is a surname.

Noble people who carry this name:

- Samuel Vincent Khouth, Canadian actor, voiced Edd a.k.a. Double D from Ed, Edd n Eddy
- Gabe Khouth, Canadian actor, voiced Nicol Amalfi in Gundam SEED and portrayed Sneezy/Dr. Clark in the Once Upon a Time TV series
