= The Year Without a Santa Claus =

1974 stop-motion television special

- Based on: The Year Without a Santa Claus by Phyllis McGinley
- Written by: William Keenan
- Directed by: Jules Bass; Arthur Rankin Jr.
- Voices of: Shirley Booth; Mickey Rooney; Dick Shawn; George S. Irving
- Narrated by: Shirley Booth
- Composer: Maury Laws
- Countries of origin: United States; Japan

Production
- Producers: Jules Bass; Arthur Rankin Jr.
- Cinematography: Akikazu Kono; Ichiro Komuro
- Running time: 51 minutes
- Production company: Rankin/Bass Productions

Original release
- Network: ABC
- Release: December 10, 1974

Related
- A Miser Brothers' Christmas (2008) (Note: Recurring characters include Snow Miser (voiced by Juan Chioran), Heat Miser (voiced by Irving), Santa (voiced by Rooney), Mrs. Claus (voiced by Catherine Disher), and Mother Earth (voiced by Patricia Hamilton) in this special. Santa's reindeer also feature.)

The Year Without a Santa Claus is a 1974 stop-motion animated Christmas television special produced by Rankin/Bass Productions. The story is based on Phyllis McGinley's 1956 book. It is narrated by Shirley Booth (her final acting credit before her retirement from acting) and stars the voices of Mickey Rooney, Dick Shawn and George S. Irving. It was originally broadcast on December 10, 1974, on ABC.

== Plot ==
Santa Claus awakens with a cold in early December. When a Christmas elf doctor sarcastically says that nobody cares about Christmas like they used to, Santa decides to forego his annual Christmas Eve journey. Hoping to change Santa's mind, Mrs. Claus instructs two elves named Jingle and Jangle to seek evidence of Christmas spirit.

Jingle and Jangle leave with Santa's youngest reindeer Vixen and land in Southtown, a small town in the Southern United States loosely based on Oxford, Mississippi. Unfortunately, their efforts to find Christmas spirit are fruitless, and Vixen is detained by a dog catcher and taken to the local pound.

After learning that Vixen is missing, Santa travels to Southtown, disguised as a civilian named "Klaus". There, he meets a boy named Ignatius "Iggy" Thistlewhite and his family. After Santa leaves to rescue Vixen, Iggy realizes Santa's true identity and resolves to help. Iggy meets up with Jingle and Jangle, who are on their way to request help from the jovial mayor of Southtown. The mayor laughs off Jingle, Jangle, and Iggy's stories, but he jokingly agrees to release Vixen if the elves can make it snow in Southtown. Unbeknownst to them, Santa has already visited the pound, freed Vixen, and returned to the North Pole.

The elves request help from Mrs. Claus, who collects the trio and brings them to the realm of Snow Miser, the keeper of cold weather, to dispatch snow to Southtown. Snow Miser informs them that Southtown is situated within the domain of his step-brother, Heat Miser, who would never allow it. They approach Heat Miser, and he offers to cooperate if Snow Miser allows him similar control over the North Pole. When neither brother proves willing to give in to the other's wishes, Mrs. Claus brings the dispute to their mother, Mother Nature, against the brothers' protests. Mother Nature summons Snow Miser and Heat Miser to her, and forcefully persuades her sons to reach a compromise where Heat Miser will let it snow in South Town and Snow Miser will allow one warm day at the North Pole.

The mayor of Southtown, stunned by the snow and realizing the elves were telling the truth, puts out a call to give Santa Claus an official day off for the upcoming Christmas. The news crosses the world, and as Christmas approaches, the children of the world send presents to Santa, generating international headlines. Touched by the outpouring of generosity, Santa decides to embark on his yuletide journey after all. Mrs. Claus remarks that "yearly, newly, faithfully and truly, somehow Santa Claus always comes".

== Voice cast ==
- Shirley Booth as Mrs. Claus
- Mickey Rooney as Santa Claus
- Dick Shawn as Snow Miser
- George S. Irving as Heat Miser
- Bob McFadden as Jingle Bells and Elf Doctor
- Bradley Bolke as Jangle Bells and Police Officer
- Rhoda Mann as Mother Nature and Mrs. Thistlewhite
- Ron Marshall as Mr. Thistlewhite and Mayor of Southtown
- Colin Duffy as Ignatius "Iggy" Thistlewhite
- Christine Winter as the Blue Christmas Girl
- The Wee Winter Singers as the Children Choir

== Songs ==
1. "Sleigh Ride" (instrumental)
2. "The Year Without a Santa Claus"
3. "I Could Be Santa Claus"
4. "I Believe in Santa Claus"
5. "It's Gonna Snow Right Here in Dixie"
6. "The Snow Miser Song"
7. "The Heat Miser Song"
8. "Blue Christmas"
9. "Here Comes Santa Claus"
10. "The Year Without a Santa Claus (reprise)"

== Release ==
An advertisement for a rerun of the special in 1998

The special premiered in 1974 on ABC and aired annually on Freeform during its 25 Days of Christmas programming block until 2017. As of 2018, American Movie Classics airs the uncut special as part of the Best Christmas Ever block. The special also airs on Warner Bros.-owned TNT and TBS as part of the All I Watch for Christmas block, the only Rankin/Bass special that TNT and TBS air.

Warner Bros. Entertainment currently distributes the special through their ownership of the post-1974 Rankin/Bass Productions library.

=== Home media ===
The special was released on VHS by Vestron Video on September 5, 1991, as part of their Christmas Classics Series, which is distributed by Family Home Entertainment. Warner Home Video released the special on VHS on September 2, 1992, and re-released it on VHS on September 28, 1999. The special was released on DVD on October 31, 2000, and re-released on the Deluxe Edition DVD on October 2, 2007. Warner Home Video released the special on Blu-ray on October 5, 2010, making it the first Rankin/Bass production to be released on that format.

== Remake and sequel ==
A live-action remake of The Year Without a Santa Claus premiered on NBC on December 11, 2006, and was released on DVD the following day. It follows largely the same plot as the original special.

A sequel titled A Miser Brothers' Christmas was released in 2008, produced by Warner Bros. Animation and Cuppa Coffee Studios, and it also uses stop-motion animation. Mickey Rooney reprised his role as Santa Claus, and George S. Irving reprised his role as Heat Miser. Dick Shawn and Shirley Booth, both of whom died prior to the film's production, were replaced by Juan Chioran and Catherine Disher as Snow Miser and Mrs. Claus, respectively.

== See also ==
- List of animated feature films
- List of Christmas films
- List of Rankin/Bass Productions films
- List of stop-motion films
- Santa Claus in film
