= Santa Baby 2: Christmas Maybe =

2009 television film directed by Ron Underwood

- Home video cover art
- Written by: Garrett Frawley; Brian Turner
- Directed by: Ron Underwood
- Starring: Jenny McCarthy; Dean McDermott; Kelly Stables; Lynne Griffin; Richard Side; Miguelito Macario Andaluz; Kris Holden-Ried; Gabe Khouth; Jessica Parker Kennedy; Paul Sorvino
- Theme music composer: Misha Segal
- Countries of origin: United States; Canada
- Original language: English

Production
- Running time: approximately 80 minutes
- Production companies: Well Done Productions Unlimited; ABC Family Original Productions
- Budget: $5 million

Original release
- Network: ABC Family
- Release: December 13, 2009

Santa Baby 2: Christmas Maybe is a 2009 made-for-television Christmas comedy film and a sequel to Santa Baby. It premiered on ABC Family on December 13, 2009, during the channel's 25 Days of Christmas programming block. Jenny McCarthy, Lynne Griffin, Jessica Parker Kennedy, Richard Side, and Gabe Khouth all reprise their roles from the original film.

== Plot ==
Santa finds himself in the midst of a late-in-life crisis. He has grown tired of the responsibilities of his job and is ready to pass on the reins to his business-minded daughter Mary, who feels torn between the family business and running her own high-stakes firm in New York City, along with balancing a relationship with the love of her life, Luke.

The situation gets increasingly dire when Teri, an ambitious new arrival to the North Pole, sows dissension at the workshop in an effort to take over Christmas. However, it is revealed that Teri is an elf, bitter at Mary and was trying to take over Christmas. Mary manages to stop her and take care of the yearly rounds around the world.

== Cast ==
- Jenny McCarthy as Mary Class/Claus
- Dean McDermott as Luke Jessup
  - Rohan Campbell as young Luke
- Kelly Stables as Teri
- Paul Sorvino as Santa Claus
- Lynne Griffin as Mrs. Claus
- Richard Side as Gary the Elf
- Miguelito Macario Andaluz as Sandy
- Kris Holden-Ried as Colin
- Gabe Khouth as Skip the Elf
- Jessica Parker Kennedy as Lucy the Elf
- James Higuchi as Dave the Elf
- Holly Ann Emerson as Young Woman
- Brendan Hunter as Jazz Club Announcer
- Leah MacDonald as Gift Wrapper

== Premiere ==
Santa Baby 2: Christmas Maybe premiered on December 13, 2009, as part of ABC Family's annual 25 Days of Christmas programming event. The film received 3.8 million viewers on its original broadcast with a 1.2 18–49 rating.

== Filming ==
- Santa Baby 2: Christmas Maybe was filmed in February 2009 in Calgary, Alberta, Canada.
- Ivan Sergei and George Wendt did not reprise their roles as Luke Jessup and Santa Claus, respectively, being replaced by Dean McDermott and Paul Sorvino.

== Soundtrack ==
Alexa Vega sang the lead track from the movie, "Christmas Is the Time to Say I Love You" and shot a music video for the song which premiered during the 25 Days of Christmas. Amber Stevens recorded a new version of the title song, "Santa Baby". The songs are featured on the compilation album Songs to Celebrate 25 Days of Christmas, released on November 3, 2009, by Walt Disney Records.

== Home media ==
Santa Baby 2: Christmas Maybe was released on DVD on October 12, 2010 in 4:3 full frame format.

== See also ==
- List of Christmas films
- Santa Claus in film
