= Aleksov =

Aleksov is a surname. Notable people with the surname include:

- Bojan Aleksov, Serbian human rights activist
- Marin Aleksov, CEO
- Andrej Aleksov, Serbian social media creator
