= Christmas Every Day =

1996 television film directed by Larry Peerce

- Genre: Comedy; Fantasy
- Based on: "Christmas Every Day" by William Dean Howells
- Written by: Stephen Alix; Nancey Silvers
- Story by: Stephen Alix
- Directed by: Larry Peerce
- Starring: Erik von Detten; Bess Armstrong; Robert Hays; Yvonne Zima; Robin Riker; Robert Curtis Brown; Julia Whelan
- Music by: Billy Goldenberg
- Country of origin: United States
- Original language: English

Production
- Producers: Gary M. Goodman; Barry Rosen
- Production location: Ashland, Virginia
- Cinematography: Gideon Porath
- Editor: Jerrold L. Ludwig
- Running time: 90 minutes
- Production companies: Goodman/Rosen Productions; MTM Enterprises; International Family Entertainment, Inc.

Original release
- Release: December 1, 1996

Christmas Every Day is a 1996 American made-for-television fantasy-comedy film based on the 1892 short story "Christmas Every Day" by William Dean Howells.

It was directed by Larry Peerce, starred Erik von Detten, and originally broadcast on The Family Channel on December 1, 1996 during their first 25 Days of Christmas programming block.

The film was remade into an ABC Family television movie in 2006 titled Christmas Do-Over.

== Original story by Howells ==
"Christmas Every Day" is a short story by William Dean Howells about a young American girl, whose wish that Christmas would come daily is granted for an entire year. It was first printed in St. Nicholas in the January 1886 issue, illustrated by Howells' daughter. It was published in 1892 by Harper & Brother in New York City and Loring, Short & Harmon in Portland.

== Plot ==
The film is set in the fictional town of Greenwood Falls, Virginia (just outside Washington, D.C.). The main character is Billy Jackson, a selfish teenager forced to relive the same Christmas every day. Billy's younger sister Sarah wishes that every day could be Christmas, and thereafter he has to keep repeating Christmas Day until he realizes the true meaning of the holiday season.

Billy finds the entire experience to be a nightmare. Each December 25, he must face the school bully and must also get involved in his grocer father's dispute with his fat-cat uncle who wants to build a mega-store and ruin the local merchants.

== Cast ==
- Robert Hays – Henry Jackson
- Bess Armstrong – Molly Jackson
- Erik von Detten – Billy Jackson
- Yvonne Zima – Sarah Jackson
- Robert Curtis Brown – Uncle David Jackson
- Robin Riker – Aunt Carolyn Jackson
- Julia Whelan – Cousin Jacey Jackson
- Tyler Mason Buckalew – Joey Manusco
- Terrence Currier – Mr. Charmers (as Terrence P. Currier)
- Kara Woods – Diane
- Lindsay Austin Hough – Mike
- Woody Robertson, Jr. – Kelly
- Jacqueline Laubacher – Reporter
- Rick Warner – Mr. McGregor
- Margaret Collier – Mrs. Patrick
- Mason Bryan – Terry Martin
- Mark Edrys – Street Santa
- Peyton Chesson-Fohl – Tommy
- Gwendolyn Moore – Mrs. Martin
- David Whorf – Dr. Baker
- Abby Beam – Girl Scout
- Glenn Crone – Santa
- Governor George Allen – Himself

== See also ==
- List of films featuring time loops
- List of Christmas films
