= The Debaters =

CBC radio show

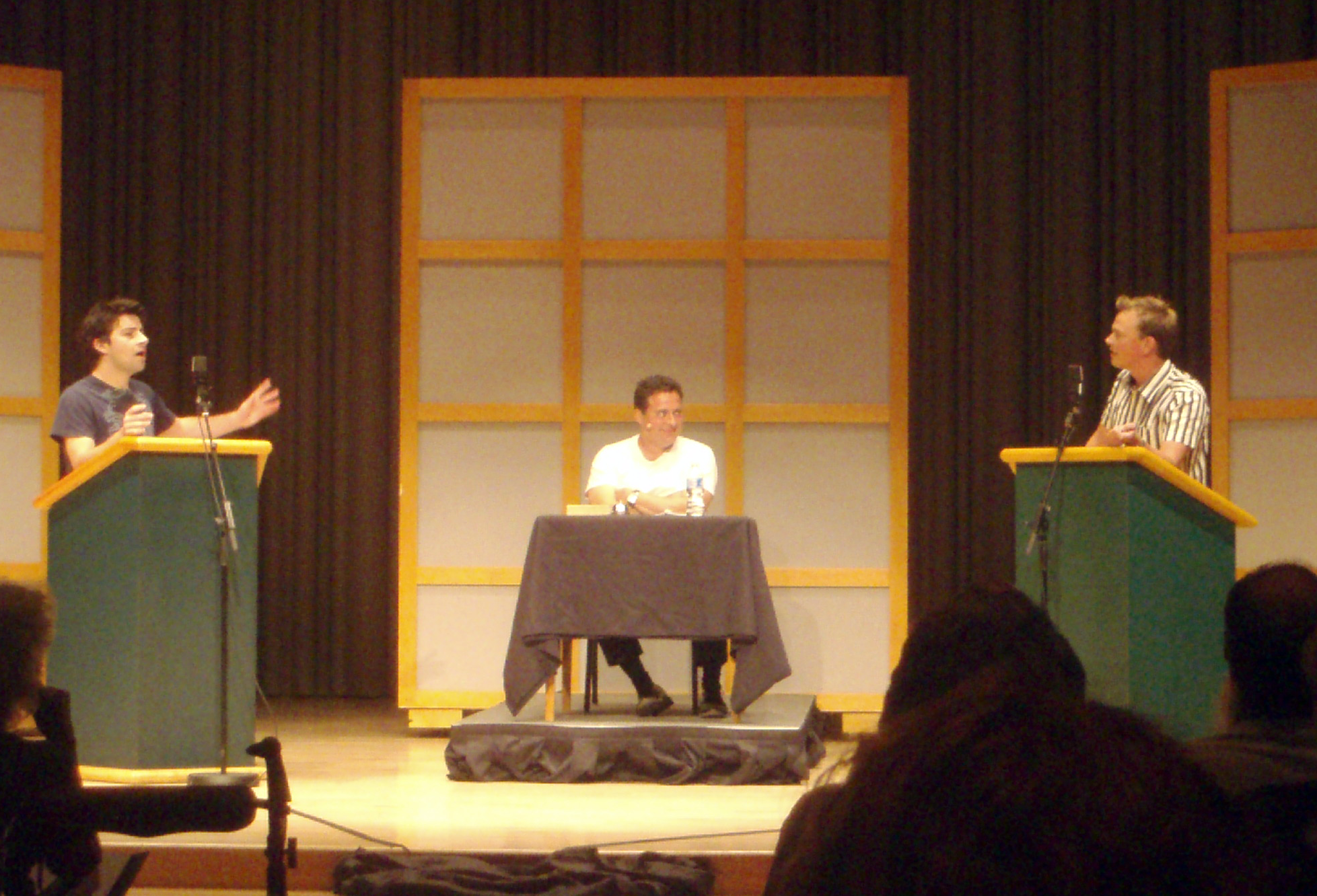
- Photo taken from a taping of The Debaters at the Glenn Gould Studio in Toronto, with Sean Cullen (centre) as host.
- Genre: Comedy; Panel game show
- Running time: 30 minutes
- Country of origin: Canada
- Language: English
- Home station: CBC Radio One; CBC Television
- Starring: Steve Patterson
- Created by: Richard Side
- Produced by: Richard Side; Phillip Ditchburn; Anna Bonokoski; Lee Pitts
- Recording studio: Various live venues across Canada
- Original release: September 2006 (CBC Radio One); 2011 (CBC Television) – present (CBC Radio One); 2011 (CBC Television)
- Website: The Debaters

The Debaters is a Canadian radio comedy show currently hosted by Steve Patterson. It airs on CBC Radio One, Saturdays at 3:00PM (PDT) and Wednesdays at 11:30AM, Eastern Time.

During each episode, two debates take place between two sets of two contestants. The topics are deliberately comedic, such as "Apples vs. Oranges and "Was Darth Vader a Bad Father?". The winner is chosen by audience reaction at the end of the debate. Each season has approximately 33 new episodes. These are recorded in front of live audiences in studios, theatres and clubs across Canada.

In 2011, the radio series also taped a number of episodes for broadcast as a television series on CBC Television; the televised version did not get a second season.

== History ==
The show was created by Richard Side; it was first broadcast in September 2006, replacing the long-running comedy show Madly Off in All Directions. It was produced by Side, along with Phillip Ditchburn and Anna Bonokoski.

Whereas the first season was entirely hosted by Shaun Majumder, the second season featured a succession of guest hosts, including Sean Cullen, Patrick McKenna and Roman Danylo. Beginning with the third season, the regular host of the show has been Steve Patterson.

Other comedians who have appeared on the show as debaters include Irwin Barker, Ian Boothby, Charles Demers, Gary Jones, Deborah Kimmett, Andy Kindler, Patrick Ledwell, Marc Maron, Mark Meer, Darcy Michael, Greg Proops, Lara Rae, Simon Rakoff, Dan Redican, Derek Seguin, Erica Sigurdson, Ron Sparks, Scott Thompson and Mary Walsh.

In 2011, the series also taped 13 episodes for broadcast as a television series on CBC Television; the televised version did not get a second season.

== Format ==
Each show is 30 minutes in length, and consists of two debates which are roughly each 15-minutes in length. Two guests, usually stand-up comedians, are given a topical and sometimes complex matter to debate; one guest serves as an advocate to the resolution while the other takes the contrary side. At the end of the debate, the host appeals to the live audience for applause for each debater, based on a mix of "funny and fact", and then declares a winner, almost always the debater who received the most applause. In instances where the host believes the audience response indicates that they enjoyed both debaters equally, "ties" have also been declared.

There are four rounds to each debate: the first allows the comedian to state their position on the issue, which is followed by the "bare-knuckle round" where the two debaters spar with each other directly. This is followed by the "firing line" round, in which the host quizzes the debaters on their knowledge of the subject, with the debaters trying to provide either the correct or most amusing answer. Finally, each debater is given the opportunity to deliver a one-minute summation of their arguments. The live audience then votes by applauding for who they thought had the best combination of "laughs and logic".

== Special episodes ==
There have been two special double-length debates (full-length episodes featuring just one debate instead of two). "William Shatner is Canada's Greatest Actor" (Sean Cullen and Eric Peterson), and "Witches vs. Wizards" (Ron Sparks and Nikki Payne). Both made Podyssey's list of all-time top five Debaters episodes, with Witches vs. Wizards at #1.

There have also been two debates featuring just one debater debating themself. Simon Rakoff did it first, debating himself on the topic of "Mixed Marriages" (S01E09). That is also the only time the show deliberately had one debater debate themself on any topic. Ron Sparks also debated himself on the topic of "Optimism vs. Pessimism", after his debating partner's flight to the show was canceled due to a blizzard.

There have also been several debates featuring more than one person arguing for one side. Most are musical duos (The Doo Wops and The Williamson Playboys), but also a set of twins.

The "Should We Marry?" debate (S12E26) recorded at the 2018 Winnipeg Comedy Festival on April 15, 2018 and airing May 5, 2018 had high stakes, with anti-wedding Dana Smith agreeing to marry her opponent/boyfriend Tim Gray if he won the debate. He win, and they married that after the show.

== Accolades ==
The show has received several Canadian Comedy Award nominations for both its radio and television versions, including two wins for Best Radio Program or Clip:

- The "Monotheism vs. Polytheism" debate featuring Ron Sparks and Sean Cullen, in 2010.
- The double-length version of the "William Shatner is Canada's Greatest Actor" debate featuring Cullen and Eric Peterson, in 2015.

== See also ==
- Lewis Black's Root of All Evil - US comedy debate show
- Argumental - British comedy debate show
