= Lynne Griffin =

Canadian actress (born 1952)

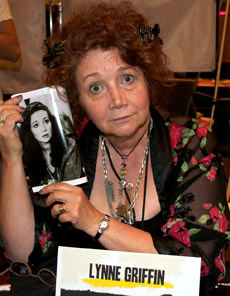
- Lynne Griffin in June 2011
- Born: 17 September 1952 (age 73); Toronto, Ontario, Canada
- Occupation: Actress
- Years active: 1970–present
- Spouse: Sean Sullivan

Lynne Griffin (born 17 September 1952) is a Canadian actress. She is known for her work in film, television and stage, particularly her appearances in the horror films Black Christmas (1974) and Curtains (1983), the Bob and Doug McKenzie comedy film Strange Brew (1983), and a recurring role on the television series Wind at My Back (1996–2001). Griffin returned to the Black Christmas universe in the 2024 fan film It's Me, Billy: Chapter 2, playing Nancy, the sister of her character in the 1974 film.

== Early life ==
Griffin was born in Toronto, Ontario, the daughter of Kay, an actress, and James Joseph Griffin, a fashion photographer and soccer player. She is married to fellow actor Sean Sullivan.

== Filmography ==
=== Films ===
Year	Title	Role	Notes
1974	Black Christmas	Clare Harrison	
1980	Mr. Patman	Monica	Credited as Lyn Griffin
1981	The Amateur	Sarah	
1983	Curtains	Patti O'Connor	
1983	Strange Brew	Pam Elsinore	
1985	The Heavenly Kid	Waitress	
1991	True Identity	Emilia	
2006	One Way		
2011	Dream House	Sadie	
2013	Let's Rap	Rhoda Schnurr	Short
2014	True Man		Short
2015	88	Hattie	
2021	Spidermama	Spidermama	Short film
2023	Priscilla	Grandma "Dodger"	
2023	Thanksgiving	Grandma	
2024	It's Me, Billy: Chapter 2	Nancy	Short Film

=== Television series ===
Year	Title	Role	Notes
1970	Drop-In	Co-Host/Reporter	
1971	Police Surgeon	Ella	1 Episode, The Importer
1979	The Great Detective	Amy Brown	1 Episode, Nightwalker of the Wards
1979 - 82	The Littlest Hobo	Laura Bailey	2 Episodes
1985	Comedy Factory	Melba / Vicki Atkin	2 Episodes
1986	Night Heat	Carla	1 Episode, Dead to Rights
1987	I'll Take Manhattan	Candice Alexander	Mini-Series
1988	War of the Worlds	Amanda Burke	1 Episode, The Second Seal
1989	Men	Isabel	1 Episode, Thomas
1992	Picket Fences	Karina Shaw	1 Episode, Remembering Rosemary
1993	NYPD Blue	Janice Bowman	1 Episode, From Hare to Eternity
1996	Traders	Isabelle Gordon	1 Episode, Separation Anxiety
1997	Riverdale	Alice	
1997–2001	Wind at My Back	Callie Cramp / Mitzi Grenfell	31 Episodes
1998	Noddy	Miss Pink Cat / Martha Monkey	Voice
1999	Storm of the Century	Jane Kingsbury	Mini-Series
1999	Dear America: So Far from Home	Aunt Nora	TV Short
2000	A Taste of Shakespeare	Flute	1 Episode, A Midsummer Night's Dream
2001	Earth: Final Conflict	Louise Jacobi	1 Episode, Lost Generation
2003	Odyssey 5	Dr. Ellie Woodruff	1 Episode, Fossil
2003	Sue Thomas: F.B.Eye	Beatrice Larkin	1 Episode, The Hunter
2004	Puppets Who Kill	Woman #1	1 Episode, Prostitutes for Jesus
2004	Murdoch Mysteries	Mrs. Wicken	1 Episode, Poor Tom is Cold
2004	ReGenesis	Francis	2 Episodes
2007	True Crimes: The First 72 Hours	Dorothy Ortiz	1 Episode, Bull's Eye
2007	'Til Death Do Us Part	Mrs. Tyler	1 Episode, The In-Law Murders
2010	Pure Pwnage	Beverly	1 Episode, Jobs
2010	Happy Town	Dot Meadows	5 Episodes
2010	Lost Girl	Halima	1 Episode, Food for Thought
2011	XIII: The Series	Maureen Dirkin	1 Episode, The Irish Version
2011	Michael: Tuesdays & Thursdays	Mrs. Bronfman	4 Episodes
2012	Warehouse 13	Dr. Nina Golden	1 Episode, There's Always a Downside
2012	The Cat in the Hat Knows a Lot About That!	Voice	1 Episode, Manatees and Mermaids/The Last Chocolate
2013	Call Me Fitz	Judge Joyce	1 Episode, Alice Doesn't Live Here, Anymore
2014	Remedy	Helga Knorpf	1 Episode, The Little Things
2014	Murdoch Mysteries	Mrs. Dewar	1 Episode, The Murdoch Appreciation Society
2015	Odd Squad	Mrs. Mac	1 Episode, Dance Like Nobody's Watching/Recipe for Disaster
2017–2018	Dot.	Nana	2 Episodes
2020	The Boys	Lois	Episode: We Gotta Go Now
2022	Workin' Moms	Beverly Berner	Episode: The Scary Thing
2024	My Dead Mom	Pearl	

=== Television movies ===
Year	Title	Role	Notes
1979	Every Person Is Guilty		
1982	The Taming of the Shrew	Bianca	
1988	Hitting Home	Karen Hughes	
1997	...First Do No Harm	Clinic Receptionist	
1999	A Touch of Hope	Nurse Beatrice	
2000	Harlan County War	Mrs. Yarborough	
2001	Jewel	Nancy Tindle	
2003	Do or Die	Blanche, Henry's Girl	
2003	Bugs	Medical Examiner	
2003	Shattered City: The Halifax Explosion	Millicent Collins	
2005	An American Girl Adventure	Lady Templeton	
2006	Between Truth and Lies	Ruth Muhike	
2006	Santa Baby	Mrs. Claus	
2007	She Drives Me Crazy	Mabel	
2008	Anne of Green Gables: A New Beginning	Mrs. Bridgewater	
2009	Santa Baby 2: Christmas Maybe	Mrs. Claus	
2010	When Love Is Not Enough: The Lois Wilson Story	Annie Smith	
2013	Fir Crazy	Betty	

=== Theatre ===
- Stratford Shakespeare Festival
- Shaw Festival
- 2002: Resurgence Theatre Company - Romeo and Juliet, The Tempest

== Awards ==
In 1980 Griffin earned an Outstanding Performance by an Actress (Non-Feature) Genie Award nomination for her role in Every Person is Guilty.
