= Erik von Detten =

American actor (born 1982)

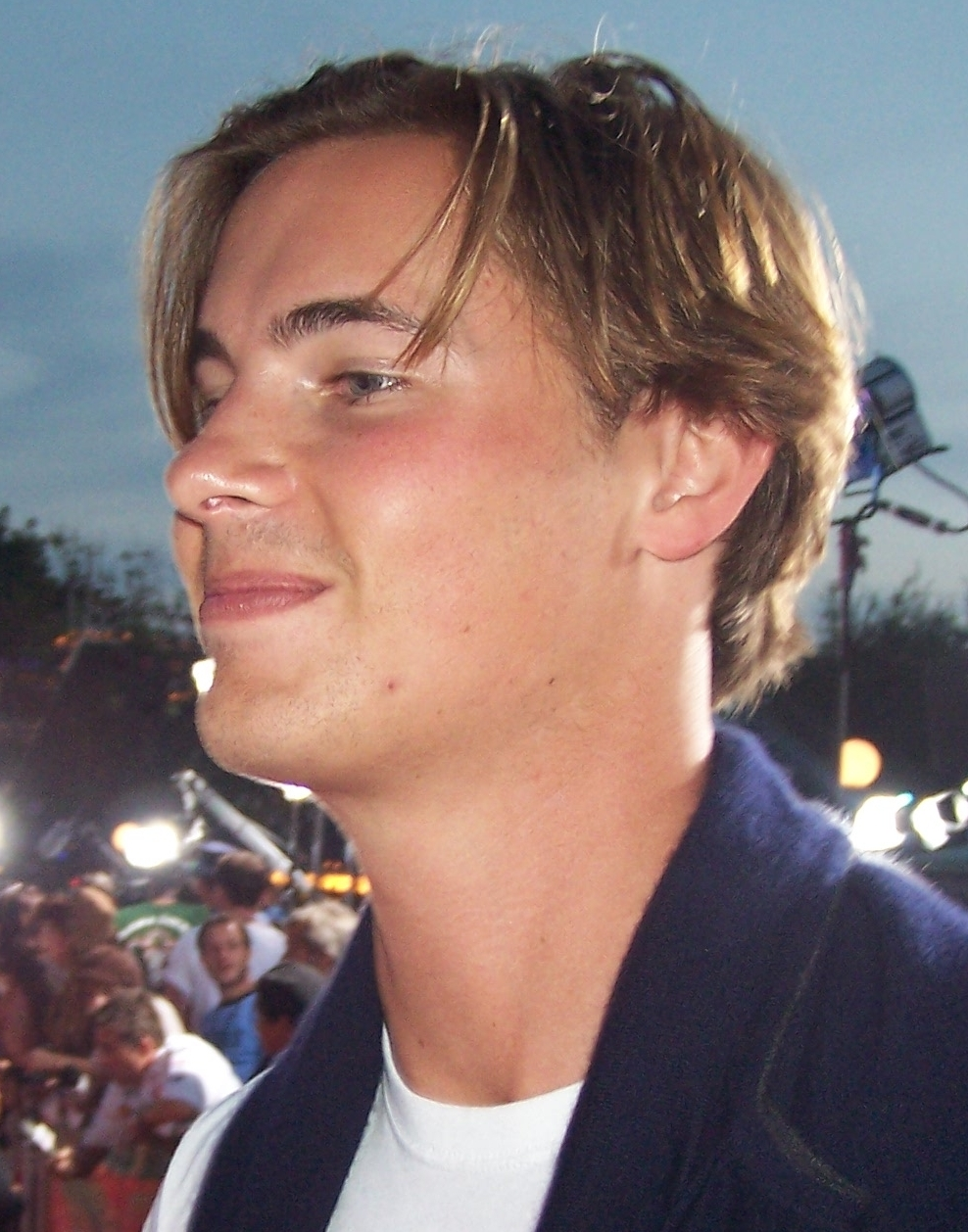
- von Detten in 2006
- Born: Erik Thomas von Detten; October 3, 1982 (age 44); San Diego, California, U.S.
- Occupations: Actor, singer
- Years active: 1991–2010; 2024–present
- Spouse: Angela von Detten (m. 2018)
- Children: 3

Erik Thomas von Detten (born October 3, 1982) is an American actor and singer. He is known for his roles in Escape to Witch Mountain, Toy Story, Brink!, Meego, The Princess Diaries, Complete Savages, and So Weird. He voiced Erwin Lawson through the full run of Recess (1997–2001) and the series' four successive direct-to-video films.

== Early life ==
Erik Thomas von Detten was born in San Diego, California, the son of Susan von Detten (née Farber), a photographer, and Volker von Detten. He has three sisters, Dolly, Britta and Andrea, and a brother, Timothy. He has German, English, and Russian Jewish ancestry.

== Career ==
One of von Detten's earliest roles was Nicholas Alamain on the daytime soap opera Days of Our Lives from 1992 until 1993, appearing in 55 episodes. Nicholas was revealed to be the secret son of Lawrence Alamain (Michael Sabatino) and Carly Manning (Crystal Chappell), two of the show's major characters. As a result, von Detten was heavily involved in some of the show's main storylines, despite only being 10 years old.

In 1995, when he was 13, von Detten provided the voice of the villainous and heartless toy-tormentor Sid Phillips in Toy Story. He also starred alongside Elisabeth Moss in the TV movie remake of Escape to Witch Mountain. He starred in the film Christmas Every Day in 1996, played Wally Cleaver in the 1997 film Leave It to Beaver, and in 1998, had the lead as the title character in the Disney Channel original movie Brink!. He followed this up on the television series So Weird, on which he played Clu Bell from 1999 to 2001. Von Detten also appeared in a theatrical release as Josh Bryant in The Princess Diaries in 2001. In addition, he has made several television appearances in shows such as Dinotopia (2002), the first celebrity edition of the ABC reality show The Mole, the third season's Celebrity Mole: Hawaii (2003), and Fox's Malcolm in the Middle.

In 2007, he made his stage debut in the children's play The Christmas Princess in Santa Monica. In 2009, he was featured in the music video "Wanted" by pop singer Jessie James. In 2010, he made a brief cameo appearance before he retired from acting in Toy Story 3 reprising his role as Sid Phillips, who is now a garbageman in his 20s.

As of 2018, von Detten worked for Rosland Capital, a precious metals asset management firm. In 2026, after the company declared bankruptcy, he was sued by an elderly couple after they claimed they invested $2 million in gold coins and discovered their investment was worth much less. The coins were allegedly stored in a warehouse.

Von Detten has been married to his wife, Angela, a Taiwanese-American real estate agent, since 2018. They have a daughter, Claire Elizabeth (b. 2019), and two sons, Thomas Henry (b. 2021), and Nicholas (b. 2022).

== Filmography ==
=== Film ===
Year	Title	Role	Notes
1991	All I Want for Christmas	Choir	
1995	Top Dog	Matthew Swanson	
1995	Toy Story	Sid Phillips (voice)	
1996	Amanda	Kelsey Farnsworth	
1997	Hercules	Boy #1 (voice)	
1997	Leave It to Beaver	Wallace "Wally" Cleaver	
1999	Tarzan	Flynt (voice)	
2001	Recess: School's Out	Erwin Lawson / Capt. Brad (voice)	
2001	The Princess Diaries	Josh Bryant	
2001	Recess Christmas: Miracle on Third Street	Erwin Lawson (voice)	Direct-to-video
2002	Tarzan and Jane	Flynt (voice)	Direct-to-video
2002	American Girl	Kenton	
2003	National Lampoon's Barely Legal	Deacon Lewis	
2003	Recess: Taking the Fifth Grade	Erwin Lawson (voice)	Direct-to-video
2003	Recess: All Growed Down	Erwin Lawson (voice)	Direct-to-video
2005	Smile	Chris	
2010	Toy Story 3	Sid Phillips (voice)	Cameo

=== Television ===
Year	Title	Role	Notes
1993	Days of Our Lives	Nicholas Alamain	Regular role
1993	Night Sins	Nicholas Alamain	TV film
1994	In the Best of Families: Marriage, Pride & Madness	Older John	TV film
1994	Aaahh!!! Real Monsters	Vic / Tough Kid (voice)	Episode: "The Switching Hour"
1995	A Season of Hope	Tyler Hackett	TV film
1995	Kidnapped: In the Line of Duty	Sam Honeycutt	TV film
1995	Escape to Witch Mountain	Danny	TV film
1995	ER	Ben Larkin	Episode: "Hell and High Water"
1996	The Bug Hunt		TV film
1996	Life with Louie	Additional voices	Episode: "Summer of My Discontent"
1996	A Stranger to Love	Justin	TV film
1996	Mr. Rhodes	Milo	Episode: "Pilot"
1996	7th Heaven	Randy	Episode: "Halloween"
1996	Christmas Every Day	Billy Jackson	TV film
1997	Things That Go Bump	Christian	TV film
1997	Meego	Trip Parker	Episode: "Pilot"
1997	Toy Story Treats	Sid Phillips (voice)	Episode: "Woody's Nightmares"
1997–2000	Recess	Erwin Lawson (voice)	Recurring role
1998	You Wish	Jeff Collins	Episode: "Bride and Prejudice"
1998	Brink!	Andy 'Brink' Brinker	TV film
1998	The Wild Thornberrys	Adolescent Jaguar (voice)	Episode: "Temple of Eliza"
1999	Replacing Dad	Drew	TV film
1999–2000	Odd Man Out	Andrew Whitney	Main role
1999–2001	So Weird	Clu Bell	Lead Role (seasons 1 & 2); guest role (season 3)
2001	As Told by Ginger	Kid #2 (voice)	Episode: "The Right Stuff"
2001	Raising Dad	Brad Singer	Episode: "The Drama Club"
2001	The Legend of Tarzan	Flynt (voice)	Recurring role
2002	Do Over	Gary Ross	Episode: "Valentine's Day Dance"
2002–2003	Dinotopia	Karl Scott	Main role
2003	Law & Order: Special Victims Unit	Drew Lamerly	Episode: "Privilege"
2003	Charmed	Newspaper Reporter	Episode: "Baby's First Demon"
2004	8 Simple Rules	Erik	Episode: "C.J.'s Party"
2004–2005	Complete Savages	Chris Savage	Main role
2005	Malcolm in the Middle	Brad	Episode: "Secret Boyfriend"
2006	Brandy & Mr. Whiskers	Additional Voices	Episode: "Dog Play Afternoon"
2007	Girl, Positive	Jason	TV film
2007	Avatar: The Last Airbender	Chan (voice)	Episode: "The Beach"
2008	Bones	Ed Dekker	Episode: "Player Under Pressure"
2009	Family Guy	Shovin' Buddy (voice)	Episode: "Peter's Progress"
2024	Acting Coach Nightmare	Mark	TV film
TBA	The Tonopah Five	Himself	Post-Production

=== Video games ===
Year	Title	Role	Notes
1996	Animated Storybook: Toy Story	Sid Phillips	

=== Music video ===
Year	Title	Role	Artist
2001	"SuperGirl!"	Student Josh Bryant	Krystal Harris
