= Richard Side =

Canadian writer, producer, and actor

Richard Side is a Canadian writer, producer, and actor known as the creator of The Debaters, a radio and TV comedy series on the Canadian Broadcasting Corporation.

== Career ==
Side has appeared in episodes of Supernatural, Psych and Eureka and the feature film Elf. Side is a comedian specializing in improvisational comedy. He won an improv comedy championship at the Just for Laughs festival performing with Vancouver Theatresports.

Side co-adapted Kenneth Oppel's novel Silverwing into a thirteen part animated series for Teletoon. Other writing credits include episodes of Kung Fu: The Legend Continues.

== Filmography ==
=== Film ===
Year	Title	Role	Notes
1991	Bingo	Network Executive	
1995	Urban Safari	Alex	
1998	Shoes Off!	Party host	
2003	The Delicate Art of Parking	Bob Gromer	
2003	Elf	Elf Teacher	
2016	Grand Unified Theory	Bhoem	

=== Television ===
Year	Title	Role	Notes
1987	Stingray	Todd	Episode: "The Second Finest Man Who Ever Lived"
1988	21 Jump Street	Manager	Episode: "Chapel of Love"
1990	The Adventures of the Black Stallion	Dan	Episode: "First Among Equals"
1990	Max Glick	Rest home employee	Episode: "Time Is on Your Side"
1997	Never a Dull Moment	Sketch Comedian	Television film
1998	The Sentinel	Tom Coleman	Episode: "Neighborhood Watch"
1998	The Crow: Stairway to Heaven	Shadow Patient	Episode: "Solitude's Revenge"
1999	The New Addams Family	Sandy Warhol	Episode: "Morticia, the Sculptress"
1999	Night Man	Dr. Madden	Episode: "Gore"
2000	The Outer Limits	Ike Pilchard	Episode: "Down to Earth"
2000	Ratz	Teacher	Television film
2000	The Wonderful World of Disney	Mr. Mann	Episode: "Suspect Behavior"
2001	Big Sound	Vincent	3 episodes
2001	Halloweentown II: Kalabar's Revenge	Benny	Television film
2001	Andromeda	Beetle	Episode: "A Heart for Falsehood Framed"
2002	Point Blank	Dr. Cracker	Episode: "Crouching Cougar"
2002	Cold Squad	Government Pencilneck	Episode: "Career Opportunists"
2002	Just Cause	Dr. Rosenthal	Episode: "Code of Silence"
2002	The Funkhousers	Mr. Ross	Television film
2004	Stargate SG-1	Guide	Episode: "Icon"
2005	Earthsea	Doorkeeper	2 episodes
2005	Young Blades	Stuart's Valet	Episode: "The Exile"
2005	Robson Arms	Mitch	Episode: "The Misses Dubois Turn Out the Lights"
2006	The Collector	The Devil / Pollster	Episode: "The Vampire"
2006	Romeo!	Mr. Jones	Episode: "Driving Me Crazy"
2006	Alice, I Think	Waiter	Episode: "Taboos"
2006	Santa Baby	Gary the Elf	Television film
2007	Secrets of an Undercover Wife	Higgins	Television film
2008	7 Things to Do Before I'm 30	Mr. Webster	Television film
2008	Journey to the Center of the Earth	Solomon Smith	Television film
2008	Aliens in America	Lionel	Episode: "Community Theater"
2008	Santa Baby 2: Christmas Maybe	Gary the Elf	Television film
2009	Psych	Maitre'd	Episode: "Tuesday the 17th"
2009	Supernatural	Paul Dunbar	Episode: "It's a Terrible Life"
2009	Eureka	Dr. Kinnison	Episode: "You Don't Know Jack"
