= The Wizard of Oz on television =

Broadcasts of the film

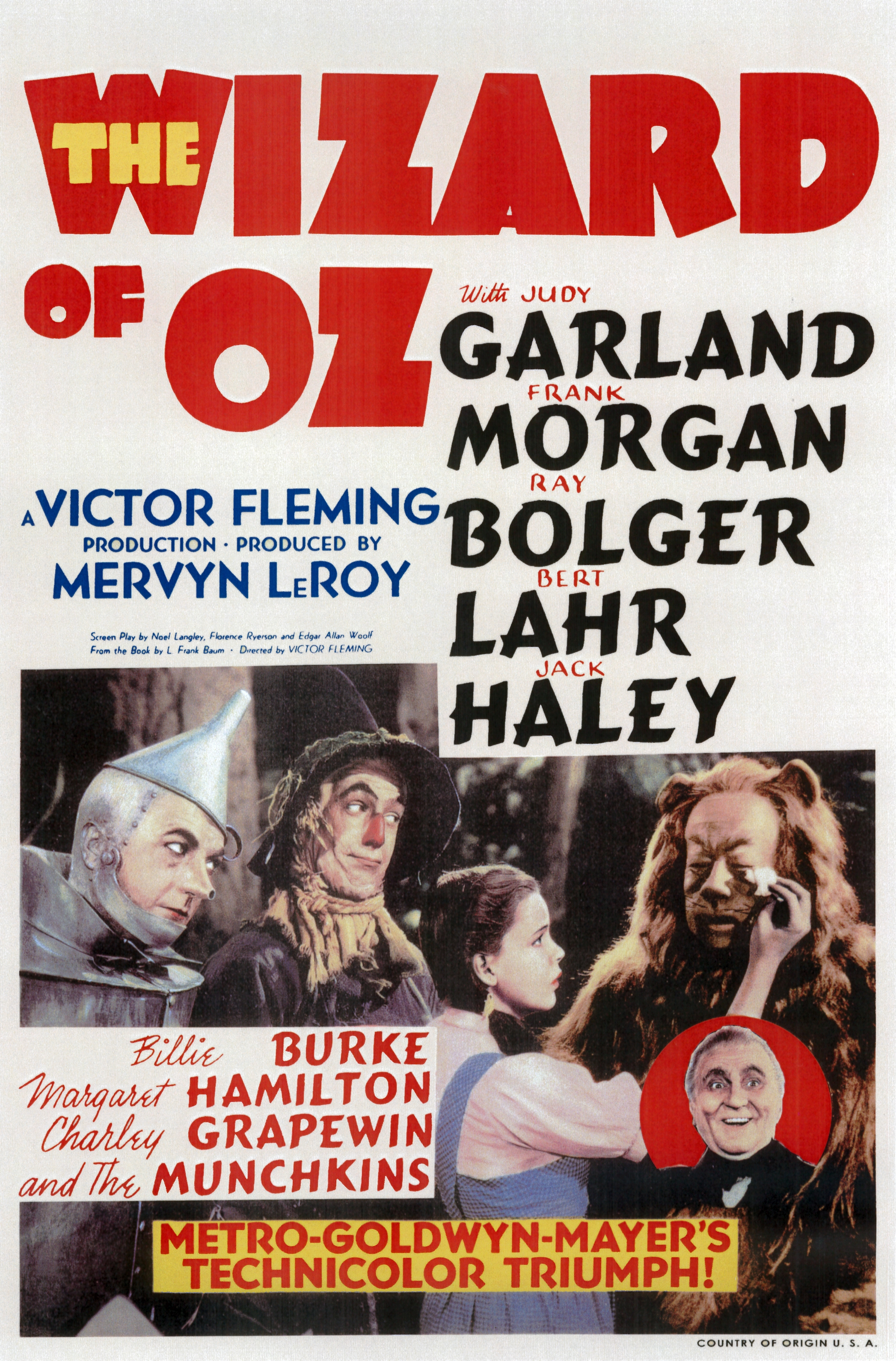
1939 theatrical release poster

The Wizard of Oz, produced by Metro-Goldwyn-Mayer (MGM), was first released in theatres on August 25, 1939. The film was then re-released nationwide in 1949, and once more in 1955. The Wizard of Oz was broadcast on television for the first time on Saturday, November 3, 1956. The film was shown as the last installment of the CBS anthology series Ford Star Jubilee. Since that telecast, The Wizard of Oz has been shown by CBS, NBC, The WB, several of Ted Turner's national cable channels, and AMC. From 1959 to 1991, the showing of The Wizard of Oz was an annual tradition on American commercial network television. During these years (and for several years afterwards), the film was always shown as a television special.

After the film's second broadcast on U.S. television, subsequent network telecasts became a highly anticipated family event for many. The Wizard of Oz drew large audiences annually for several decades.

Until 1999, The Wizard of Oz had only been shown in the United States on commercial broadcast television. After the film went to cable, television showings of the movie became increasingly more frequent. At this point, the tradition of televising the film only once per year was ceased in the United States.

The Wizard of Oz has become perhaps the most famous and cherished film to be shown regularly on U.S. television. Of the many family-oriented musical fantasies broadcast after 1955, The Wizard of Oz is the only one still being shown regularly. Following the 1956 premiere, there were no rebroadcasts of the film until 1959. The 1959–1962 broadcasts occurred during autumn, between Thanksgiving and Christmas. Beginning with the 1963–64 season, these special presentations were seen in the first quarter of the year as well as around Easter and Passover. The film was not broadcast in the U.S. in the years 1963, 1992, or 1995.

The film was first issued on home video formats in 1980.

== First telecast ==
The Wizard of Oz, which had been a critical but only modest financial success during its theatrical run, was chosen to be the first Hollywood film to be shown uncut in prime time on a coast-to-coast television network. The first telecast took place on Saturday, November 3, 1956, as part of the final program in the soon-to-be-canceled CBS anthology series Ford Star Jubilee – a rotating potpourri of highly budgeted but low-rated specials, including a well-publicized debut hour hosted by Judy Garland. The original asking price of $250,000 was negotiated by MGM attorney, later company president, Frank Rosenfelt. The network paid MGM $225,000 for the rights to televise the film and committed to showing it again for the same price with an option to re-broadcast if the telecast was a success.

This 1956 broadcast was shown as CBS's response to the successful color telecast of the Broadway musical Peter Pan with Mary Martin, which had been re-staged especially for television at NBC Studios as part of the anthology series Producers' Showcase. Peter Pan was first shown live on television by NBC in 1955 and repeated (again live) by public demand in 1956. Its enormous success on television ushered in a temporary "fad" of mostly live family-oriented specials based on fantasy tales, such as Aladdin (1958), Alice in Wonderland (1955) (a live-action version), Rodgers and Hammerstein's Cinderella (1957), The Pied Piper of Hamelin (1957), and Pinocchio (1957, no relation to the Disney film). As part of this trend, CBS bought the rights from MGM to telecast The Wizard of Oz.

For the first television broadcast of The Wizard of Oz, the normally 90-minute Ford Star Jubilee was expanded to a full two hours to accommodate the entire film, which, in addition to having commercial breaks, was celebrity-hosted. The main reason that CBS arranged for a host for the film was that at 101 minutes, the film was not considered long enough to run in the allotted 120-minute slot at that time, even with commercial breaks, without additional content to pad the entire telecast out to two hours.

The 1956 television debut of the film marked the only time any actor who had appeared in the movie was selected to host the broadcast: Bert Lahr, who played the Cowardly Lion (and his Kansas farmhand counterpart Zeke) in the film, appeared alongside the daughter of Judy Garland, a then 10 year-old Liza Minnelli, and young Oz expert Justin G. Schiller. Lorna Luft, Minnelli's half-sister, did not appear as she was only four years old at the time, although she did have her picture taken with Minnelli in a promotional photo. Unlike several of the other Oz telecasts, apparently no stills were taken during the hosting sequences in 1956. The practice of a show business celebrity regularly "hosting" The Wizard of Oz lasted from the film's first television showing until 1968, when the film went to NBC after being shown on CBS nine times.

The film was always presented uncut in a two-hour time slot between 1956 and 1968, despite having commercials and hosted segments. The Professor Marvel sequence has never been omitted (at least in American telecasts of the film), and the tracking shot of Munchkinland was not edited until the film went to NBC in 1968.

The film's first broadcast received positive critical notices in newspapers the following day. Variety magazine prophetically suggested that the film could be telecast annually and at an earlier time.

The film was a ratings success with a Nielsen rating of 33.9 and an audience share of 53%.

== Telecasts in the pre-cable era ==
The film was not rebroadcast in 1957 or 1958. For telecasts from 1959 (the year of its second telecast) up until 1998, the film was always shown as a stand-alone TV special instead of as part of an anthology or movie series. Between 1959 and 1968, and again in 1990 when Angela Lansbury, star of CBS' Murder, She Wrote, hosted the 50th-anniversary telecast, CBS chose its hosts from its then-current prime time line-up. In 1959, the host was Red Skelton (The Red Skelton Show); in 1960 it was Richard Boone (Have Gun – Will Travel), in 1961 and 1962 it was Dick Van Dyke (The Dick Van Dyke Show), and from 1964 through 1967, it was Danny Kaye (The Danny Kaye Show). Skelton, Boone and Van Dyke brought their then-young children along to appear with them.

Although the hosting segments for the 1956 telecast of the film had to be done live, Skelton's, Boone's, Van Dyke's and Kaye's segments were recorded on videotape in advance of the telecasts. Lansbury's hosting segment was the first one recorded on film.

During these years, the hosting sequences were not staged in a run-of-the-mill manner with the host merely standing in a studio set, but in what could be considered imaginative ways. Richard Boone was taped on the set of his television series Have Gun – Will Travel, in a "living room" with his real son about to watch the film on a TV set. Dick Van Dyke was shown in a living room set with his children, and Danny Kaye's hosting segment featured him sitting on a prop toadstool against a painted backdrop of the Yellow Brick Road and the Emerald City. The Kaye segment did not include a television set as part of its design.

Some humor was sometimes incorporated into these segments. Red Skelton was seen as two characters: Before the film began, he was seen in a studio set of an early 20th-century bookstore, in costume as a Victorian-era storyteller who introduced L. Frank Baum's original 1900 novel The Wonderful Wizard of Oz to a young girl played by Skelton's real daughter, and at film's end, he appeared in a studio recreation of a modern living room as himself. Danny Kaye reassured viewers not to panic when the film began in black-and-white rather than in color, and encouraged young viewers not to be afraid of the roaring MGM lion at the beginning of the film. No directors or writers were credited for the hosting sequences, just as none are credited for hosting segments prior to films on Turner Classic Movies.

The Wizard of Oz did not become an annual television tradition immediately — only after the 1959 showing because of the earlier hour at which it was shown (6:00 P.M., E.S.T.). More children tuned into the broadcast, and it gained an even larger television audience than before with a Nielsen rating of 36.5 and an audience share of 58%. The 1959 telecast was especially welcomed by media critic John Crosby, who commented in the New York Herald Tribune, "Television — any television — looks awfully ordinary after The Wizard of Oz". From 1959 until 1991, the film was telecast once every year the one exception being 1963, when it was not telecast at all.

WISN-TV in Milwaukee, Wisconsin, did not carry the network's yearly Oz telecast in 1961, the year WISN began its affiliation with CBS, running Green Bay Packers football instead. However, due to viewer outcry, WISN was able to get permission to run the film locally at 2:00 p.m. C.S.T., on Christmas Eve.

=== "Wraparound" opening and closing credits ===
The film, as telecast on U.S. television between 1959 and 1968, was arguably given a much more elaborate TV presentation than it received afterwards. During those years, it always had videotaped wraparound opening and closing credits segments devised by CBS, accompanied by the network's own specially recorded opening and closing music based on the film's score. For the opening "wraparound" credits, the title The Wizard of Oz and the names of its five leading actors, Judy Garland, Frank Morgan, Ray Bolger, Bert Lahr and Jack Haley, were first shown in CBS's own format and font, while an anonymous announcer read them off and then followed this with an announcement of the film's sponsor(s): "This portion of The Wizard of Oz is brought to you by...[name of sponsor mentioned]". These specially-devised opening credits never mentioned that the film was made by Metro-Goldwyn-Mayer. From 1959 to 1964, CBS created different wraparound credits for each showing, but because the same hosting segment — the Danny Kaye one — was shown between 1964 and 1968, audiences saw the same "wraparound" credits from 1964 until the film went to NBC.

The special CBS introduction was followed by the host speaking about the movie for about three minutes or so. Those remarks lead into the actual film, beginning with all of its original 1939 opening credits (shown against a background of moving clouds), including the MGM Leo the Lion logo, the name of the film, the cast list, and the film's principal technical staff, exactly as MGM had created them, with the film's main title music heard.

The host reappeared just before the film's second half began, to say a few more words about it, before the telecast proceeded with the rest of the film, commercials included.

However, at the end of the movie, the film's closing cast list, as created by MGM, was not shown, nor was the title card with "The End" right after Dorothy's closing line ever seen on television during these early CBS showings. Instead, immediately after Dorothy spoke her last line ("Oh, Auntie Em, there's no place like home!"), and the camera faded out on her, television viewers once again saw CBS's own title card The Wizard of Oz, this time accompanied by some of the film's end title music, exactly as heard on the soundtrack, and the announcer's voice saying that the host for that year would return in a moment. After a final commercial, the host was then seen once again, to bid farewell to the TV audience, and CBS showed its own version of the cast list that appears during the film's end credits. At the end, referring to both the film and the hosting segments, the same announcer declared that "This has been a film and videotape presentation."

=== Shown in color ===
From the beginning The Wizard of Oz was telecast in color, although few people owned color television sets in 1956. Except for 1961, all U.S. telecasts have been in color, an effect that seemed much more striking in the early 1960s, when there were still relatively few color programs on television. It was not televised in color in 1961 because color telecasts had to be paid for by their sponsors, who declined to do so that year. Between 1956 and 1965, the Wizard of Oz showings were rare exceptions to the black and white program schedule at CBS. During this period, CBS had the ability to broadcast programs in color, but generally chose not to do so unless a sponsor paid for a film or program to be shown in color. During this period, the competing network NBC was owned by RCA, which by 1960 manufactured 95% of the color sets sold in the U.S. Hence, CBS perceived that increased use of color broadcasting would primarily benefit its rival by promoting sales of RCA color television sets.

Not until the fall of 1965 did color broadcasts play a major role at CBS and ABC, at which time half the network shows from ABC and CBS were being made and shown in color. Meanwhile, all but two NBC prime time shows were in color and most of NBC's daytime shows were. By the fall of 1966, all three networks produced all of their prime time shows in color. By the time the movie went to NBC in 1968, all network shows (except for reruns of black and white movies) were in color.

=== Later hosts ===
Partly because commercial time during programs increased beginning in the late 1960s, the idea of regularly having hosts to introduce the film was dropped when The Wizard of Oz went to NBC in 1968, where no "wraparound" sequence was shown. The presentation consisted only of the film itself, with its original opening and closing credits, and no special NBC-created credits or hosting segments. The famous NBC peacock was shown immediately prior to the beginning of the film, with announcer Mel Brandt saying that "the first 22 minutes of this program [i.e. the Kansas and tornado sequences] will be shown in black-and-white", a not quite accurate statement, since the final three minutes of the film also took place in Kansas, and were at that time also shown in black-and-white, rather than in the sepia tone in which they originally had been made (the sepia was not restored to the Kansas and tornado scenes until 1989, the film's 50th anniversary). However, one NBC telecast featured an on-screen host: the 1970 showing, which opened with veteran actor Gregory Peck paying tribute to the recently deceased Judy Garland (a segment directed by Oz producer Mervyn LeRoy, marking his first TV work), although this segment consisted of only a few brief remarks, while the opening hosting segments on CBS had gone on for about three minutes or so. The NBC Oz telecasts began the tradition of the film's annual showings during the Easter and Passover seasons of the year as opposed to the winter showings on CBS.

The switch in networks resulted because CBS was unwilling to meet MGM's increased price — fostered by the film's ever-increasing popularity — for renewal of the rights to telecast it. The film stayed on NBC until 1976. When CBS, realizing its error in allowing it to go to another network, bought back the rights at MGM's asking price, their viewer ratings shot up, and one executive was heard to remark, "That picture is better [for the network] than a gushing oil well".

After its 1976 return to CBS, the film was hosted on that network only once more, in a filmed segment featuring Angela Lansbury in 1990, but the CBS "wraparound" opening and closing credits were not - and have never been - revived, although, during those years, a blue card featuring a painting of a rainbow and the title The Wizard of Oz was shown on the screen while the night's pre-empted programs or programs to be shown at regular time following the movie and the sponsors were being announced, and immediately before and after commercial breaks. In the 1980s clips from the film shown on a red background with title was shown at the start, while a still of Emerald City with title was used during commercials. Angela Lansbury also narrated a documentary about the making of the film, originally entitled The Wonderful Wizard of Oz: 50 Years of Magic and years later re-titled The Wonderful Wizard of Oz: The Making of a Movie Classic. It was first shown immediately after the movie's 1990 telecast, and is included as a supplement on all the DVD releases beginning with the 1999 DVD release. Jack Haley, Jr., the documentary's director, was nominated for an Emmy Award for his work.

When shown on Turner Classic Movies, The Wizard of Oz was usually hosted by TCM host Robert Osborne.

On June 3, 2007, Tom Kenny, the voice of SpongeBob SquarePants, hosted a telecast of the film on Turner Classic Movies, as part of Essentials, Jr., a special summer series of family movies.

On July 27, 2008, the film was shown twice in a row on TNT without a host, but with commercials, and with "pop-up" animated ads for other TNT programs at the bottom of the screen just before and after commercial breaks.

On March 24 and 25, 2012, the film was hosted on Cartoon Network by television actor Robert Wu, who provides the voice of Mr. Washee Washee in the Family Guy episode, "Tiegs for Two". This telecast ran two-and-a-half hours, longer than any CBS or NBC telecasts.

On June 10, 2012, which would have been Judy Garland's 90th birthday, the film was telecast on Turner Classic Movies without commercials, and hosted by comedian Bill Hader, again as part of the Essentials, Jr. summer series of family films. Unlike the CBS hosting segments which were a part of the 1960s telecasts of the film, Hader's segment showed clips from the film before it actually began.

The film's return to broadcast television, on MeTV (see below), was hosted on October 2, 2026 by Lisa Whelchel., followed by a second airing the following day hosted by horror host Svengoolie and The Sven Squad.

=== Sponsorship ===
Being a presentation of network television, The Wizard of Oz was subject to sponsorship from a variety of advertisers.

The first telecast of "Oz" was a presentation of Ford Star Jubilee and thus sponsored by Ford Motor Company and its dealers. In the ensuing years of 1959 thru 1967, the yearly telecast was sponsored by one primary sponsor with a co-sponsor. Perhaps the best remembered examples were the telecasts sponsored by Procter and Gamble and promoted when the company gave free premiums of hand puppets with packages of some of its most popular products. Many also remember the 1970 telecast presented on NBC by Singer Manufacturing Company as a tribute to Judy Garland, who had died in June 1969.

In later years, several different advertisers shared sponsorship; no one advertiser predominated.

=== Television ratings ===
The showing in 1983 was the 25th network prime-time showing, a record then for any film or television special. In the first nine showings, all on CBS, The Wizard of Oz gained at least 49% of the television audience. In 1966, it ranked No. 1 in the ratings for the week that it was shown. Between 1960 and 1968, the film even beat out episodes of ABC's Walt Disney Presents (in 1960) and NBC's Walt Disney's Wonderful World of Color (from 1961 to 1968), which aired opposite the film. When the film moved temporarily from CBS to NBC, it always pre-empted the Disney program altogether, except for once, when NBC showed Oz on a Saturday in 1968. When CBS bought the film back from NBC in 1976, it again began to beat episodes of Disney in the ratings. It pre-empted Disney on one more occasion, after the series moved to that network in the early 1980s.

In 2006, the first year it was shown on television in high-definition, the film placed No. 11 in the Nielsen ratings among cable television programs for the week of November 11.

=== Changes made in running time ===
From 1968 to 1984, minor cuts were made to the film in order to make room for added commercial time and enable the film to "clock in" at two hours. No dialogue or singing was removed, only moments such as camera pans and establishing shots, as well as MGM's written foreword to the film were removed.

On a few occasions beginning in 1985, again because of the increased time, which was spent on commercial breaks, the film was time-compressed in order to fit it into a two-hour running time without cutting it. However, The Wizard of Oz is now always shown complete and at its regular speed on television, both with and without commercials. When shown with ads, the film now runs about two hours and fifteen minutes, simply because of the increase in commercial time.

=== March 1991 showing ===
The March 1991 showing was the first showing after the film gained protected status from the Library of Congress and the National Film Preservation Board. Networks opted to discontinue shortening the film by "micro-cutting" a few individual moments throughout the movie as they had done from the late 1960s to the early 1980s in order to make room for commercials and keep it in a two-hour broadcast. This extended the running time of the film from 8 P.M to 10:07 p.m. and sometimes it was extended even longer, depending on the amount of time which was spent on commercials. It was one of the first 50 films to be selected for this protection.

== Move to cable ==
In 1986, Ted Turner purchased the MGM film archives, which included The Wizard of Oz and Gone with the Wind. Because both films were still licensed to CBS, Turner and CBS negotiated a deal that extended CBS' license for The Wizard of Oz in exchange for relinquishing its rights to Gone with the Wind. In 1991, the film was shown twice a year for the first time. 1991 also marked the first time since 1956 that the film was shown in November. This also happened in 1993, when the film was telecast in February and November. The film was not aired in 1992, and 1995, marking the first time since 1963 that a year was skipped in showings of the film. Turner began moving to make its properties exclusive to its own (by then Time Warner) outlets in the late 1990s; as such, in 1998, The Wizard of Oz made its last appearance on CBS, moving exclusively to Time Warner-owned properties the following year. From 1999 to 2004, the film was exclusively aired on TNT around Thanksgiving a few times in a row on certain days. Beginning in 2004 (and every year since), the film has exclusively broadcast on TBS several times in a row on certain days around Thanksgiving weekend. Beginning in 2014, the film has always been broadcast on TNT several times in a row on certain days either before or close to Christmas.

2000 marked the first time that the film was shown on U.S. television during the summer. In 2002, it was shown five times.

On November 6, 2011, TBS became the American television network on which The Wizard of Oz has been aired most often, when the film had its 32nd showing on that channel, finally breaking CBS' record 31 showings. As of January 13, 2024, Turner Classic Movies has shown the film 32 times.

In 2025, Warner Bros. Discovery (which by then owned the film and the former Turner networks) sublicensed the rights to the film to AMC for carriage on its Best Christmas Ever block.

=== Differences between network and cable showings ===
In addition to the frequent cable showings, another difference between showings on NBC, CBS, the WB network, and cable channels is that when the film was shown on CBS and NBC, it was always presented as a special instead of just a televised film. From 1959 until it went to cable, the film was never shown on NBC Saturday Night at the Movies or any other movie anthology series, and telecasts of the film regularly preempted two hours or more of regular television programming.

=== Aspect ratio ===
The 1955 and 1998 theatrical re-releases were matted in movie theaters to produce a widescreen effect for the Academy-standard aspect-ratio film.

When shown in HDTV, the film is pillarboxed so that its aspect ratio is preserved. On DVD, the film has always been issued in its original 1939 aspect ratio.

== Return to broadcast television ==
On February 5, 2026, Weigel Broadcasting announced that it had acquired the broadcast rights to The Wizard of Oz and would air the film several times during the month of October on its MeTV network as part of its Halloween program lineup. This marks the film's return to broadcast television. On October 27 of that year, The CW announced that it too would air the film as part of its holiday programming. It will premiere on the network on November 25, the day before Thanksgiving, and air again on December 20.
