= 25 Days of Christmas =

Annual seasonal television event by Freeform

Freeform's 25 Days of Christmas
- Logo used since 2018
- Network: The Family Channel (1996–1997); Fox Family (1998–2000); ABC Family (2001–2015); Freeform (2016–present); Disney Channel (2017–2018); Disney XD (2017–2018); Disney Jr. (2017–2018); ABC (2017–2018)
- Launched: December 1, 1996; 29 years ago
- Country of origin: United States
- Formerly known as: The Family Channel's 25 Days of Christmas (1996–1997); Fox Family's 25 Days of Christmas (1998–2000); ABC Family's 25 Days of Christmas (2001–2015)
- Format: Christmas-based films and programming, along with some non-seasonal films
- Running time: Daily and nightly, annually from December 1 to 25
- Original language: English
- Official website: Official site

Freeform's 25 Days of Christmas is an American annual seasonal event of Christmas programming broadcast during the month of December by the U.S. cable network Freeform. Launched on December 1, 1996, it consists primarily of reruns of Christmas-themed television specials, theatrical films (some of which are not related to Christmas), and originally produced television films, which air throughout the day and night from December 1 through Christmas Day, preempting the channel's regular lineup.

25 Days of Christmas programming often attracts major surges in viewership for Freeform, with higher-profile film airings often attracting 3–4 million viewers or more. Freeform has described the block, along with its companion October block 31 Nights of Halloween, as its tentpole.

== History ==
The event was first held in 1996, and has been an annual fixture of the channel through its various incarnations, including The Family Channel, Fox Family, ABC Family, and Freeform. The brand covers airings of classic holiday specials as well as new Christmas-themed television movies each year; generally few of the network's original series air during the time period, outside of Christmas-themed episodes and contractually obligated Christian Broadcasting Network programs (such as The 700 Club). Since 2006, the lineup has also included airings of non-Christmas feature films from the network's library (including Walt Disney Studios releases, and until 2017, the Harry Potter films). In 2007, the block was extended to November with a Countdown to 25 Days of Christmas event.

In 2017 and 2018, Disney extended the 25 Days of Christmas branding to holiday programming across the entire Disney-ABC Television Group, including ABC, Disney Channel, Disney XD, and Disney Junior.

For most of the block's run, fourteen specials from the Rankin/Bass Productions library of Christmas specials (excluding the original Rudolph the Red-Nosed Reindeer and Frosty the Snowman specials, both of which aired on CBS from 1972 and 1969 respectively through 2023) served as the centerpiece of the 25 Days of Christmas. Freeform lost the rights to twelve of those specials (which included The Year Without a Santa Claus), along with other content whose right was held by Warner Bros. Discovery and its predecessor companies such as Elf, The Polar Express and National Lampoon's Christmas Vacation, to AMC after the 2017 Christmas season to serve as the linchpin of its new "Best Christmas Ever" schedule; WBD also carries that content on its own All I Watch for Christmas and Christmas Maximus blocks on the WBD-owned former Turner networks. Freeform still airs Santa Claus is Comin' to Town and The Little Drummer Boy In May 2019, Freeform announced it had acquired the cable rerun rights to the Rudolph and Frosty specials, reuniting the four pre-1974 Rankin/Bass programs on the same network. CBS continued to hold the free-to-air rerun rights to both specials until NBC retained the rights to the 2024 airings. Freeform and ABC also held rights to the Charlie Brown holiday specials until Apple TV+ acquired the exclusive rights to the franchise in 2020 (later sublicensing some of the specials to PBS for one-time airings that year).

In November 2022, Freeform sister network ABC launched 25 Days of Christmas Past, a free ad-supported streaming television pop-up channel featuring an abbreviated selection of original films produced for the event. The FAST service does not include the four Rankin-Bass specials, as NBCUniversal, which owns the underlying copyrights, did not license any streaming rights to those specials to ABC/Freeform nor CBS. The FAST channel did not return for 2024, after ABC withdrew its streaming apps from the market and downsized its remaining FAST offerings.

In 2018, Freeform rebranded the graphics for its 25 Days of Christmas event to align with the channel's then-current branding, which had debuted that same year. In 2023, Freeform collaborated with the design agency ROVE to update the 25 Days of Christmas graphics once again, making them consistent with the channel's latest logo and branding introduced the previous year.

Freeform struck an agreement with NBCUniversal, expanding on its 2019 licensing agreement, to bring more specials and films owned by that company to the 25 Days of Christmas block in 2025, including The Legend of Frosty the Snowman and the original version of Miracle on 34th Street.

== Programming ==
=== Original specials ===
- 1996 – Home and Family Christmas Special
- 2001 – Donner
- 2008 – A Miser Brothers' Christmas, Cranberry Christmas
- 2009 – Gotta Catch Santa Claus, Holly and Hal Moose: Our Uplifting Christmas Adventure
- 2011 – A Very Pink Christmas
- 2017 – Disney Parks Presents a Disney Channel Holiday Celebration
- 2025 – Prep & Landing: The Snowball Protocol, The Wonderful World of Disney Holiday Spectacular
- 2026 – Sleigh the Family Room, Mickey's Home Alone

=== Original films ===
Nearly every year since 25 Days of Christmas debuted in 1996, at least one new holiday-related TV film has been produced (excluding 2002, 2014, and 2015). Starting in 2005, two TV films have been produced. In 2007, three films were created for the block, due to the popularity of the previous year's films.

==== The Family Channel era: The Family Channel's 25 Days of Christmas ====
- 1996 – Christmas Every Day
- 1997 – The Christmas List

==== Fox Family era: Fox Family's 25 Days of Christmas ====
- 1998 – Like Father, Like Santa
- 1999 – The Ghosts of Christmas Eve
- 2000 – Special Delivery
- 2001 – Three Days

==== ABC Family era: ABC Family's 25 Days of Christmas ====
- 2003 – Picking Up & Dropping Off
- 2004 – Snow
- 2005 – Chasing Christmas; Christmas in Boston
- 2006 – Christmas Do-Over; Santa Baby
- 2007 – Christmas Caper; Holiday in Handcuffs; Snowglobe
- 2008 – Christmas in Wonderland; Snow 2: Brain Freeze
- 2009 – The Dog Who Saved Christmas; Santa Baby 2: Christmas Maybe
- 2010 – The Dog Who Saved Christmas Vacation; Christmas Cupid; The Gruffalo
- 2011 – Desperately Seeking Santa; 12 Dates of Christmas
- 2012 – The Mistle-Tones; Home Alone: The Holiday Heist
- 2013 – Holidaze, Christmas Bounty

==== Freeform era: Freeform's 25 Days of Christmas ====
- 2016 – Holiday Joy
- 2017 – Angry Angel
- 2018 – Life-Size 2, No Sleep 'Til Christmas, The Truth About Christmas
- 2019 – Ghosting: The Spirit of Christmas, Same Time, Next Christmas
- 2026 – A Very Jonas Christmas Movie

== Acquired programming ==
As of 2026, the following acquired programs are included on the 25 Days of Christmas:

=== Specials ===
- The Cricket on the Hearth
- Frosty the Snowman (shared with NBC)
- Kung Fu Panda Holiday
- The Little Drummer Boy
- Merry Madagascar
- Prep & Landing (original special, shared with ABC and Disney Channel)
- Rudolph the Red-Nosed Reindeer (shared with NBC)
- Santa Claus Is Comin' to Town (shared with ABC)

=== Film franchises ===
- Frozen (Frozen, Frozen 2 and Olaf's Frozen Adventure)
- Home Alone (original, Lost in New York and animated special "Mickey's Home Alone")
- Mickey's Once Upon a Christmas and Mickey's Twice Upon a Christmas
- Santa Buddies (Air Bud) (The Legend of Santa Paws, The Search for Santa Paws and The Santa Pups)
- Snow and Snow 2: Brain Freeze
- The Santa Clause (film trilogy)
- Toy Story (film tetralogy and Toy Story That Time Forgot)

=== Films ===
- Arthur Christmas
- A Christmas Carol (2009)
- The Grinch (2018)
- How the Grinch Stole Christmas (2000)
- I'll Be Home for Christmas (1998)
- The Legend of Frosty the Snowman
- Mariah Carey's All I Want for Christmas Is You
- Miracle on 34th Street (1994)
- The Nightmare Before Christmas
- Richie Rich's Christmas Wish

== Countdown to 25 Days of Christmas, Kickoff to Christmas, FUNDAY and 30 Days of Disney ==
In 2007, due to popular ratings from the previous year, ABC Family launched the first official countdown to the block, which began on November 21. Although this was the first official early start, holiday programming in previous years had unofficially begun during the last week of November, airing mostly older original films, some of which pertained to Christmas while some did not. Countdown to 25 Days of Christmas returned in 2008 on November 16. In 2018, Freeform announced that the block would be renamed to Kickoff to Christmas, and would last throughout the month of November. This was reprised in 2019.

In 2023, Freeform abandoned the Countdown/Kickoff block in favor of a "30 Days of Disney" event, featuring films mostly from the Walt Disney Company's animated features library, to bridge the entire month of November between 31 Nights of Halloween and 25 Days of Christmas. Christmas movies are sparingly featured. The 25 Days of Christmas Past FAST channel launched in early November.

=== 2011 ===
In 2011, it started later in the month, on November 20. In 2012, the Countdown began at an earlier date of November 18.

=== 2014 ===
The Countdown to the 25 Days of Christmas ran again in 2014. In 2014 the countdown event which started on Sunday, November 23 was even with previous years. The highest rated programs of the eight-day event were Finding Nemo at 1.8 million viewers, Despicable Me at 2 million, and an airing of The Hunger Games at 1.7 million. Other highlights included Ratatouille on Thanksgiving night which garnered 1 million, Cars 2 gained 1 million, and Brave which had 1.8 million tune in.

=== 2015 ===
The Countdown to 25 Days of Christmas schedule was released on October 29, 2015. The 2015 lineup included family classics such as Toy Story, Finding Nemo, Jingle All the Way, Monsters, Inc., Ratatouille, The Incredibles, Willy Wonka and the Chocolate Factory, and the cable premiere of Planes. A Monday, November 30 airing of The Polar Express was watched by 1.5 million viewers, the highest rating of this year's Countdown. A Saturday, November 28 airing of Wreck-It Ralph was also watched by 1.5 million viewers. The network premiere of Planes on Thanksgiving night garnered only 0.699 million viewers.

=== 2016 ===
The Countdown to 25 Days of Christmas schedule was released on October 22, 2016. In 2016, Freeform's first Countdown to 25 Days of Christmas ran from Thanksgiving Day, November 24, to December 25. The 2016 lineup includes family movies such as Toy Story, Toy Story 2, Toy Story That Time Forgot, Brave, Tangled, Happy Feet Two, Tooth Fairy, Another Cinderella Story, Mulan, Wreck-It Ralph, Matilda, Little Rascals, Willy Wonka and the Chocolate Factory, and Despicable Me. Freeform also announced the network premiere of The Odd Life of Timothy Green, The Boxtrolls, and A Cinderella Story: If the Shoe Fits. The holiday movies in the 2016 Countdown to 25 Days of Christmas included: Fred Claus, The Holiday (Freeform network premiere), Scrooged, Jingle All the Way, National Lampoon's Christmas Vacation, and Deck the Halls.

The 2016 ratings were on par with previous years. The highest airing of the Countdown was the November 26 airing of Tangled, gaining 1.461M viewers. Despicable Me gained 1.2M on November 25.

=== 2017 ===
The Countdown to 25 Days of Christmas schedule was released on October 12, 2017. In 2017, Freeform's Countdown to 25 Days of Christmas ran from November 18, to November 30. The 2017 lineup included family movies such as The Incredibles, Despicable Me, Harry Potter, Willy Wonka & the Chocolate Factory, Hook, Dennis the Menace, Matilda, Charlie and the Chocolate Factory, and The Boxtrolls. Freeform also announced the network premiere of Inside Out and Snow Day. The holiday movies in Countdown to 25 Days of Christmas included: Home Alone, Elf, National Lampoon's Christmas Vacation, Four Christmases (Freeform network premiere), 'Twas the Night Before Christmas, Santa Paws 2: The Santa Pups, Frosty's Winter Wonderland, Jack Frost, The Year Without a Santa Claus, A Christmas Carol, A Dennis the Menace Christmas, Richie Rich's Christmas Wish, Jack Frost, Rudolph and Frosty's Christmas in July, Arthur Christmas, Rudolph's Shiny New Year, Eloise at Christmastime, and The Nightmare Before Christmas.

=== 2018 ===
On May 15, 2018, Freeform announced that Countdown to 25 Days of Christmas would be renamed Kickoff to Christmas for November. The schedule was released on October 10. The Kickoff to Christmas 2018 lineup ran from November 1 to 30, and includes films such as Jumanji, The Good Dinosaur, Inside Out, Norm of the North, Ratatouille, Yogi Bear, Frozen, Babe, Meet the Robinsons, The Incredibles, Toy Story, Storks, Paddington, and Zootopia.

=== 2019 ===
The 2019 Kickoff to Christmas schedule included multiple airings of animated films including Moana, Zootopia, Cars, Shrek, The Lorax, Pocahontas, Beauty and the Beast, The Incredibles, Happy Feet and Happy Feet 2. Other films aired across the month included Paddington, Mrs Doubtfire, Scooby Doo, Grown Ups, Matilda, Iron Man, Pitch Perfect, Percy Jackson & the Olympians: The Lightning Thief and Mary Poppins. Christmas films which aired during the block included the Home Alone franchise, Miracle on 34th Street, How the Grinch Stole Christmas, Arthur Christmas, Deck the Halls, and The Santa Clause trilogy, which aired in a marathon on November 30th.

As aforementioned, this year marked the first time that the original Rudolph and Frosty specials aired on an American cable television network. Premieres of Fantastic Mr. Fox, Despicable Me 2, The BFG and Captain America: The Winter Soldier aired during the month of November.

=== 2020 ===
The 2020 block consisted of airings of animated films including Frozen, Moana, Inside Out, Shrek, Cloudy with a Chance of Meatballs, Tangled, Pocahontas, The Hunchback of Notre Dame, The Princess and the Frog and The Incredibles. Other films aired during the block included ET the Extra-Terrestrial, Alvin and the Chipmunks, A Cinderella Story, The Sorcerer's Apprentice, The Parent Trap, The Goonies, Pitch Perfect, Matilda, and The Princess Bride. November 3rd was dedicated to a Hunger Games marathon. Christmas films aired during the block included Miracle on 34th Street, Christmas with the Kranks, Deck the Halls, Home Alone, Home Alone 2: Lost in New York, A Christmas Carol and The Santa Clause trilogy.

Several films made their network premiere during the block, including Cloudy with a Chance of Meatballs 2, Minions, Despicable Me 3, A Wrinkle in Time, Christopher Robin, The Secret Life of Pets, Black Nativity, Penguins of Madagascar, The Nutcracker and the Four Realms, and Incredibles 2.

=== 2021 ===
The Kickoff to Christmas brand was not used in 2021; the network however aired multiple films throughout the month of November. Highlights included airings of Mrs Doubtfire, Shrek Forever After, E.T. the Extra-Terrestrial, Sherlock Holmes, Maleficent and Paddington. Films making their network premiere across the month included Think Like a Man, Sherlock Holmes: A Game of Shadows, Men in Black 3, and Pixels. Several Freeform Original Christmas films were aired, including Ghosting: The Spirit of Christmas, 12 Dates of Christmas, and The Mistle-Tones.

=== 2022 ===
2022 did not feature a specifically branded programming block throughout November, with much of its schedule consisting of episodes of its regularly scheduled series, such as The Office, Family Guy and black-ish. Films were aired throughout the month, including the animated films Hotel Transylvania, The Secret Life of Pets, Shrek Forever After, Smurfs: The Lost Village, The Boss Baby, Trolls, Pocahontas, The Little Mermaid, and Coco. Other films which aired included Just Go With It, Maleficent, Hook, Aladdin, Enchanted, The Princess Diaries, Jumanji: The Next Level, National Treasure, and Bad Moms, amongst others. Christmas films which aired during the month included Home Alone, Home Alone 2: Lost in New York, and The Nightmare Before Christmas.

=== 2023 ===
The Kickoff to Christmas block was replaced this year with a 30 Days of Disney block. Across the month, many Disney animated films were aired, including Mulan, Lilo & Stitch, The Lion King, Moana, Tangled, The Princess and the Frog, Wreck-It Ralph, Encanto, The Little Mermaid, Aladdin, Zootopia and Frozen. Pixar animated films were also aired, including Inside Out, Coco, The Incredibles, Brave, Ratatouille, and the Toy Story films. Other animated films which aired during the block included the Despicable Me trilogy, Shrek Forever After, Hotel Transylvania, Ice Age: Collision Course, Gnomeo & Juliet, How to Train Your Dragon: The Hidden World and Spies in Disguise. Several live-action films aired, including Spider Man, Spider Man 2, The Princess Bride, and Mrs Doubtfire, as well as the first four films in the Pirates of the Caribbean franchise. Christmas films were also included in the block, such as Home Alone, Home Alone 2: Lost in New York, The Santa Clause trilogy, and How the Grinch Stole Christmas.

=== 2024 ===
The 30 Days of Disney block again aired this year throughout November. Animated films aired during the month included Moana, Encanto, Frozen, Pinocchio, Tarzan, 101 Dalmatians, Hercules, The Fox and the Hound, Bambi, and Cinderella. Pixar films aired included Onward, Soul, WALL-E, A Bug's Life, Turning Red, and Luca, along with a Toy Story marathon on November 2nd and a Cars marathon on November 9th. Live action films featured in the block included 101 Dalmatians, The Princess Diaries, The Jungle Book, Aladdin, Cinderella and Alice in Wonderland, along with a Pirates of the Caribbean marathon on November 22nd. Other films which aired through the month included The Secret Life of Pets 2, Casper, Ghostbusters: Afterlife, the Despicable Me series, Jumanji: The Next Level, The Princess Bride, and How to Train Your Dragon: The Hidden World. Several Christmas films also appeared in the lineup, including The Grinch, Home Alone, Home Alone 2: Lost in New York and The Santa Clause trilogy.

=== 2025 ===
The 30 Days of Disney block was announced in October, with this year's lineup including classic Disney animated films such as Fantasia, Snow White and the Seven Dwarfs, Beauty and the Beast, The Little Mermaid, The Sword in the Stone, The Hunchback of Notre Dame, Brother Bear, Lady and the Tramp, and Bambi, along with more contemporary films including Zootopia, Strange World, Moana, Tangled, and Big Hero 6. Pixar films aired throughout the month included Inside Out, Ratatouille, Coco, Elemental, Turning Red, and Brave, along with a Toy Story marathon on November 2nd and a Cars marathon on November 28th. Live action films aired in the block included Jungle Cruise, Mary Poppins, 101 Dalmatians, Bedtime Stories, Beauty and the Beast, The Game Plan and Freaky Friday, as well as a Pirates of the Caribbean marathon on November 16th. Other films aired during the month included Night at the Museum, The Princess Bride, and the first three Alvin and the Chipmunks films. Christmas films were also featured, including A Christmas Carol, How the Grinch Stole Christmas, Jingle All the Way, Home Alone, Home Alone 2: Lost in New York and The Santa Clause trilogy.

=== 2026 ===
The 2026 block includes airings of classic Disney films including Bambi, The Jungle Book, Dumbo, The Great Mouse Detective, The Aristocats, Lady and the Tramp, The Rescuers, Peter Pan, Oliver & Company and Alice in Wonderland, alongside contemporary films including Zootopia, Wreck-It Ralph, Big Hero 6, Encanto, Tangled and Frozen. Live action films aired in the block included The Princess Diaries, Aladdin, Freaky Friday, Mary Poppins, Cruella, The Little Mermaid and Mulan. Pixar films aired during the block included Finding Nemo, Finding Dory, Ratatouille, Onward, Luca, Turning Red, Brave, and the network premiere of Inside Out 2, along with the traditional marathon of the Cars trilogy on November 11th. Other films which aired during the month included The Princess Bride, Mrs Doubtfire, Spies in Disguise and Edward Scissorhands. Several Christmas films were also featured in the lineup, including Arthur Christmas, The Grinch, How the Grinch Stole Christmas, The Nightmare Before Christmas, A Christmas Carol, Home Alone, Home Alone 2: Lost in New York and The Santa Clause trilogy.

== Ratings ==
=== 2006 ===
The network premiere of The Polar Express was watched by more than 4 million viewers. An encore airing on December 9 was watched by a record 5 million viewers. It became the most watched programming to ever air on ABC Family. The debut airing of the film, Santa Baby, was watched by 4.7 million viewers.

=== 2007 ===
The first week of programming averaged 2.3 million viewers.

=== 2008 ===
In 2008, the first week of programming attracted 2.7 million total viewers. The entire lineup had an average 2.5 million viewers.

=== 2009 ===
The third annual "Countdown to 25 Days of Christmas" was watched by 1.2 million viewers. The network premiere of The Santa Clause 3 was watched by 1.6 million viewers, while an airing of Harry Potter and the Goblet of Fire was watched by 1.5 million viewers. The premiere of Santa Baby 2: Christmas Maybe was watched by 3.8 million total viewers.

=== 2010 ===
The fourth annual "Countdown to 25 Days of Christmas" was watched by 2.1 million viewers. The lineup began its first week with record breaking 3 million average viewers. The December 12 premiere of Christmas Cupid was watched by a total of 3.4 million viewers. Total viewers for 2010 broke records, averaging 2.8 million viewers. An airing of How the Grinch Stole Christmas drew 1.3 million viewers.

=== 2011 ===
The first week of the 25 Days of Christmas was watched by an average of 2.2 million viewers, down 27% from last year. During the second week, viewers increased to 2.4 million, thanks to the premiere of 12 Dates of Christmas. However, this was still down 30% from the previous year. Overall viewers for the 2011 lineup averaged 2.3 million viewers.

=== 2012 ===
In 2012, the programming block had its most ever total viewers in its debut week, with 2.9 million. An airing of the film Dr. Seuss' How the Grinch Stole Christmas on December 2 became the lineup's most watched program ever, with 5.4 million viewers. Other notable airings included, the network premiere of Despicable Me, watched by over 4.3 million viewers, and a Christmas Eve airing of The Santa Clause 2, watched by 3.9 million viewers. The programming block averaged 2.8 million viewers for 2012, on pace with 2010.

=== 2014 ===
In its 17th year, 25 Days of Christmas powered ABC Family as the top cable network in primetime among women 18–34. The entire line-up averaged 2.5 million viewers. A Friday, December 5 airing of Dr. Seuss' How The Grinch Stole Christmas was watched by 3.7 million. The network premiere of Toy Story That Time Forgot gained 3.4 million while an airing of the classic Toy Story 3 gained 2.7 million viewers. The highest rated airing of Elf gained 3.5 million viewers while the highest rated airing of National Lampoon's Christmas Vacation gained 3.2 million. An airing of the Tim Allen classic The Santa Clause with limited commercials gained 2.9 million viewers.

Christmas Eve ratings on the network saw ratings of The Polar Express at 2.2 million, Home Alone at 2.7 million, and National Lampoon's Christmas Vacation and Elf each at more than 4 million.

The holiday airings of Pretty Little Liars gained 2 million viewers while Chasing Life gained 1.2 million. The comedies of Melissa and Joey and Baby Daddy gained 1 million and 800,000 viewers respectively.

=== 2015 ===
In 2015 the highest rated event was an airing of Elf on December 5 at 3.7mil, and another airing on December 24 at 3.1mil. Ratings on Christmas Eve were down on the network due to increased competition from other networks. Elf proved once again to draw large audiences. On December 1 The Polar Express gained 2.4mil, an airing of Dr. Seuss' How the Grinch Stole Christmas gained 2.4mil, 2.7mil, and 2.9mil on multiple dates. The highest airing of The Santa Clause was December 2 gaining 2.6mil.

An airing of the Toy Story trilogy on December 13–14 gained 2mil, 2.5mil, and 1.4mil. Christmas Eve on the network was National Lampoon's Christmas Vacation at 2.4mil, and Elf at 3.1mil. Christmas Day was weak, averaging less than 2mil per airing.

=== 2016 ===
The 25 Days of Christmas schedule was released in late October by Freeform. While notable absences include Jim Carrey's How the Grinch Stole Christmas, Home Alone, and the second and third The Santa Clause films, the schedule still includes many classics. The schedule includes 25 days of classics like, Willy Wonka & The Chocolate Factory, National Lampoon's Christmas Vacation, The Santa Clause, Tim Burton's The Nightmare Before Christmas, Jack Frost, Disney's A Christmas Carol, The Polar Express, The Holiday, Elf, Jingle All The Way, Scrooged, Deck the Halls, Toy Story, Frozen, and Happy Feet.

2016 ratings of 25 Days of Christmas were down from previous years. The highest rated airing was December 4, when Elf gained 2.5M viewers. Other airings of Elf gained 2.1M, 1.8M, and 2.0M. A Toy Story marathon on December 10 gained 1.3M, 1.5m, and 1.4m. An airing of Frozen gained 2.3M on December 17.

Christmas Eve on the network saw The Polar Express at 1.4M, The Santa Clause at 1.7M, Elf at 2.7M, and National Lampoon's Christmas Vacation at 2.8M viewers.

=== 2017 ===
Alongside its traditional lineup of acquired and Disney films, the lineup for 2017 included the new original film Angry Angel, starring Jason Biggs and Brenda Song, and the new special Decorating Disney: Holiday Magic, which documented how Disney's theme parks are prepared for the holiday season. On October 31, 2017, it was announced that the 25 Days of Christmas branding would also be used for holiday programming on sister properties ABC (including new seasons of The Great Christmas Light Fight and The Great American Baking Show, as well as other traditional specials such as A Charlie Brown Christmas and the Disney Parks Christmas Day Parade), Disney Channel (including Disney Parks Presents a Disney Channel Holiday Celebration), Disney Junior (including The Lion Guard special "Timon and Pumbaa's Christmas"), and Disney XD (including holiday-themed episodes of Milo Murphy's Law and Star vs. the Forces of Evil).

Nielsen estimated that at least 150 million viewers watched part of a program on Freeform during the event.

=== 2018 ===
Over the first two weeks after Thanksgiving, average viewership of feature films on Freeform fell by 36% over 2017, due primarily to its loss of several major mainstays of the 25 Days lineup, such as the Harry Potter film series (whose cable rights moved to Syfy and USA Network earlier in the year) as well as various Warner Bros.-owned films and specials (including Elf and National Lampoon's Christmas Vacation, and 12 Rankin/Bass specials) that were acquired by AMC for a competing holiday lineup. The original movie Life-Size 2 (a sequel to a 2000 ABC made-for-TV film, starring Tyra Banks) was seen by 1.26 million viewers.

=== 2019 ===
This year's airing includes The Muppet Christmas Carol as well as the premiere of Prancer Returns, Ghosting: The Spirit of Christmas, Perfect Holiday, Rudolph the Red-Nosed Reindeer, Frosty the Snowman and Same Time, Next Christmas.

=== 2020 ===
This seasonal airing includes It's a Very Merry Muppet Christmas Movie, Christmas with the Kranks, Deck the Halls, Snow, Snow 2: Brain Freeze, Jingle All the Way 2, and The Preacher's Wife as well as the network's premieres of The Grinch, The Night Before, Almost Christmas, The Star and Black Nativity.

=== 2021 ===
This year's lineup included airings of staples of the block, including The Santa Clause trilogy, the Home Alone franchise, A Christmas Carol, How the Grinch Stole Christmas, The Grinch, Jingle All the Way, Love Actually and The Night Before. The block also featured the network premiere of Office Christmas Party. The only non-Christmas films which aired during the block was a marathon of the first four Toy Story films, which aired on December 11th.

=== 2022 ===
This year's block included many of the block's staple films, including the Home Alone series, The Santa Clause trilogy, The Grinch, Miracle on 34th Street, A Christmas Carol, Scrooged, Mickey's Once Upon a Christmas and The Nightmare Before Christmas. Various specials also aired during the block, such as Kung Fu Panda Holiday, The Little Drummer Boy, Prep and Landing and Frosty the Snowman. The block also featured the network premieres of Mr. Magoo's Christmas Carol, Walt Disney Animation Studios' Frozen 2 and a short film, Olaf's Frozen Adventure. Similar to last year, the only non-Christmas films in the block was a marathon of the first four Toy Story films, which aired on December 9th.

=== 2023 ===
This year's lineup included the first three Home Alone films, The Santa Clause trilogy, How the Grinch Stole Christmas, The Grinch, Mickey's Once Upon a Christmas, Mickey's Twice Upon a Christmas, A Christmas Carol, Miracle on 34th Street, Eloise at Christmastime and Jingle All the Way. The block also featured the network premieres of the Disney+ original films Noelle and Godmothered. Frozen and Frozen 2 were also featured, along with a marathon of the first four Toy Story films on December 9th.

=== 2024 ===
This year's lineup featured staples of the block, including the Home Alone films, The Santa Clause trilogy, How the Grinch Stole Christmas, A Christmas Carol, Jingle All the Way and Miracle on 34th Street. Other festive films aired during the block included Arthur Christmas, Christmas with the Kranks, I'll Be Home for Christmas, Richie Rich's Christmas Wish, Black Nativity, and the network premiere of Mariah Carey's All I Want for Christmas is You. Two other network premieres, Dashing Through the Snow and Santa's Little Helper, also aired. The traditional Toy Story marathon aired on December 13th, and the only other non-Christmas film featured in the block was an airing of Moana on December 1st.

The 2024 version of the block reached 32 million viewers over its course, ranking first among entertainment cable networks in that block's time span.

=== 2025 ===
This year's lineup is once again anchored by The Santa Clause and Home Alone franchises, alongside The Grinch, How the Grinch Stole Christmas, Arthur Christmas, Mickey's Once Upon a Christmas, A Christmas Carol and Jingle All the Way. Other films airing during the block include Love Actually, I'll Be Home for Christmas, The Nightmare Before Christmas and Life Size 2: A Christmas Eve. Network premieres which featured in the block included The Legend of Frosty the Snowman, and the original 1947 version of Miracle on 34th Street. December 12th was dedicated to a marathon of the first three Home Alone films, and December 13th featured the traditional marathon of Toy Story films.

=== 2026 ===
The 2026 schedule featured regular staples of the block, including The Santa Clause trilogy, the Home Alone franchise, A Christmas Carol, Miracle on 34th Street, Arthur Christmas, I'll Be Home for Christmas, Mickey's Once Upon a Christmas and Mickey's Twice Upon a Christmas. How the Grinch Stole Christmas and The Grinch aired throughout the month, as well as having a dedicated day of back-to-back airings of both films on December 4th. Similarly, December 11th featured back-to-back airings of The Santa Clause trilogy, and December 18th featured a back-to-back marathon of the first three Home Alone films. Also included in the schedule was the network premiere of A Very Jonas Christmas Movie, as well as airings of Frozen, Frozen 2, the first three Ice Age films, The Nightmare Before Christmas, Eloise at Christmastime, and shorts including Olaf's Frozen Adventure, Merry Madagascar, Prep & Landing, and Ice Age: A Mammoth Christmas.

== See also ==
- 31 Nights of Halloween
- All I Watch for Christmas
- Best Christmas Ever (program block)
