= Babes With Blades =

Babes With Blades Theatre Company is a Chicago-based stage combat theatre company emphasizing stories of marginalized genders.

== History ==
In 1997 Dawn "Sam" Alden staged four performances billed as Babes With Blades: An Evening of Women Wielding Weapons as a showcase for female stage combatants in the Chicago area. Thereafter, Babes With Blades was formally incorporated as a theater company whose mission statement read:

"...to expand opportunities for women in the world of stage combat. By exploring theatrical violence as a storytelling tool and as a means to entertain, educate, and enlighten, we challenge traditional expectations, push personal limitations, and celebrate the historical role of the woman warrior and her modern evolution."^{[1]}

Since the late 1990s, the company has worked with other Chicago-based arts organizations to develop resources and promote awareness in the field of women's stage combat. Two collaborations with Chicago Dramatists resulted in new scripts written for female actor-combatants, and Babes With Blades' own playwriting initiatives (Joining Sword and Pen and New Plays Development Program) continue to generate new works focused on female characters in strong, complex dramatic and comedic roles. In addition to theatrical productions, the company's promotional and educational projects include stage combat and acting workshops, appearances at festivals and in the media, newsletters and demonstrations.

In 2020 the company updated their mission statement to reflect support of all folks of marginalized genders beyond just women.

== Joining Sword and Pen International Playwriting Competition ==
The Joining Sword and Pen competition was established in 2005, in an effort to promote the writing of scripts and the production of plays with physical stage combat roles for women.

The inaugural theme was proposed by Society of American Fight Directors Fight Master David Woolley, inspired by Emile Bayard’s painting entitled An Affair of Honor, depicting a duel between two women on a secluded country road.

Since inception, the competition has been held bi-annually, with the winning play receiving the Margaret Martin Award and being produced as part of the company's theatrical season. All entries are inspired by particular works of art chosen for the competition, and must have women in most or all of the primary roles, and featured in most or all of the combat.

== Joining Sword and Pen Playwriting Competition winners ==
- 2026/2027: Rachel Leighson for C.O.V.E.N.
- 2023/2024: Maggie Smith for Calvaria
- 2020/2021: Jillian Leff for The Gatekeepers (later retitled The S Paradox)
- 2019/2020: Catherine McKay for Plaid as Hell
- 2017/2018: Arthur M. Jolly for The Lady Demands Satisfaction
- 2015/2016: Dustin Spence for The Promise of a Rose Garden
- 2013/2014: Jeff Goode for Witch Slap
- 2011/2012: Arthur M. Jolly for Trash
- 2009/2010: Arthur M. Jolly for A Gulag Mouse
- 2007/2008: Barbara Lhota for Los Desaparecidos
- 2005/2006: Byron Hatfield for Mrs. Dire's House of Crumpets and Solutions and Tony Wolf for Satisfaction

== Notable alumni ==
- Brooke Elliott
