= Santa Baby (film) =

- DVD Cover
- Written by: Garrett Frawley; Brian Turner
- Directed by: Ron Underwood
- Starring: Jenny McCarthy; Ivan Sergei; Kandyse McClure; Michael Moriarty; Tobias Mehler; Lynne Griffin; George Wendt
- Theme music composer: Misha Segal
- Country of origin: United States
- Original language: English

Production
- Executive producers: Steve Carr; Heidi Santelli; Sven Clement
- Producers: Jody Brockway; Craig McNeil
- Running time: 89 minutes
- Production company: Granada International
- Budget: $5,000,000 (estimated)

Original release
- Network: ABC Family
- Release: December 10, 2006

Related
- Santa Baby 2: Christmas Maybe

Santa Baby is an ABC Family Original Movie. It premiered on December 10, 2006, on ABC Family as part of their annual 25 Days of Christmas event. The film stars Jenny McCarthy, Ivan Sergei, and George Wendt and was filmed in Calgary, Alberta, Canada. It was directed by Ron Underwood.

== Synopsis ==
Mary Class is a high powered businesswoman with her own marketing firm, as well as secretly being the daughter of Santa Claus. When her father falls ill near Christmas, she is forced to return to the North Pole to take his place. She employs her marketing and business management techniques to revitalise the workshop elves, and reconnects with her lost love Luke.

== Cast ==
- Jenny McCarthy as Mary Class/Claus, the daughter of Santa and Mrs. Claus
- Ivan Sergei as Luke Jessup
- Kandyse McClure as Donna Campbell
- Michael Moriarty as T.J. Hamilton
- George Wendt as Santa Claus
- Tobias Mehler as Grant Foley
- Lynne Griffin as Mrs. Claus
- Jessica Parker Kennedy as Lucy the Elf
- Sykes Powderface as Sven
- Richard Side as Gary the Elf
- James Higuchi as Dave the Elf
- Gabe Khouth as Skip the Elf
- Tom Carey as Bob the I.T. Guy

== DVD ==
The DVD was released on November 20, 2007, in anamorphic 16:9 widescreen. The DVD includes special features such as Still Gallery, Trailers and English & Spanish Subtitles.

== Reception ==
Santa Baby was a ratings hit for ABC Family, pulling in over 4.7 million viewers during its initial airing, making it, at the time, the most watched original movie developed for the channel.

Reviews of the film were generally favorable. The Los Angeles Times dubbed Santa Baby "a charming film", Mike Hughes of the Gannett News Service said it was "quite clever", and the New York Post gave it three stars, calling it "...a pretty nice movie".

== Sequel ==
A sequel, Santa Baby 2: Christmas Maybe, premiered on December 13, 2009.

== See also ==
- List of Christmas films
- Santa Claus in film
