= The Christmas Princess =

Play written by Arthur M. Jolly

- Written by: Arthur M. Jolly

The Christmas Princess is a children's play comedy written by Arthur M. Jolly. It opened off-Broadway in December 2005 at The Coop Theatre Company in Los Angeles and is published by YouthPlays, Inc. The play was written as a modern fairytale, blending elements of the western European Brothers Grimm fairy tale and Japanese folklore.

The Christmas Princess is a popular choice for school drama programs and community theatre groups.

== Productions ==
The original production opened on December 2, 2005, at the off-Broadway Coop Theatre Company (now closed, located on Santa Monica Boulevard in Los Angeles.) Robert Miano originated the role of King Heironymous. The play was revived in 2007 at the Black Box Theatre. The 2007 production of the play was directed by Paul Messinger and choreographed by Monica Juodvalkis. The Christmas Princess marked the stage debut of noted TV and movie actor and teen idol Erik von Detten, who played the role of the handsome Prince.

In December 2009, the play was revived at the 3rd Street Promenade playhouse in Santa Monica. Only one actor has played in all three of the Los Angeles performances - John Frank, who originated the role of the Jester, before playing the Bear and finally King Heironymous.

The play was revived again by the Fremont Civic Theatre, and by the Magnolia Arts Council in Arkansas and the Muskegon Civic Theatre in Michigan.

== Plot ==
The story is introduced by a jester – the worst jester ever: A fictional medieval kingdom is ruled by a cold-hearted queen and a gruff and imperious king (King Heironymous). They have arranged for their daughter – the most beautiful (and incredibly spoiled) princess to marry a handsome – but dumb as a bucket of rocks – prince on Christmas Day. The Jester has failed to make the king laugh, and the King gives him an ultimatum: make him laugh by Christmas Day or be banished to a dungeon.

Unhappy with her parents' choice, and desperate to find a way out of the marriage, the Princess disguises herself as a maid, and seeks the advice of Watt the Witch, who sends her on a quest to find three magical gifts that will allow her to escape the wedding.

The crisis escalates when the handsome though dim-witted prince arrives a day early – and falls for the maid, whom he believes to be the princess.

While the Princess meets a handsome – but poor – woodsman, and tackles a scary bear and an even scarier dragon on her journey, the Jester conspires to keep the King from discovering the truth.

By Christmas morning, the Princess has retrieved her magical gifts – although they turn out to be far less magical than she thought; and the King and Queen discover the Maid and the Prince – but when the Woodsman and the Prince turn out to be impostors as well, everyone, in classic fairy-tale tradition, lives happily ever after.
