= Arthur M. Jolly =

American playwright and screenwriter (born 1969)

- Born: 1969 (age 56–57); Sussex, U.K.
- Occupations: screenwriter, playwright
- Website: www.arthurjolly.com

Arthur M. Jolly (born 1969) is an American playwright and screenwriter. In 2006, he was awarded an Academy of Motion Picture Arts and Sciences Nicholl Fellowship in Screenwriting for his comedy The Free Republic of Bobistan.

== Early life ==
Jolly was born in Lewes, England, the son of Sir Richard Jolly, a development economist, and Lady Alison Jolly, a primatologist. He graduated from Stuyvesant High School in 1987, where he was a student of Frank McCourt. From 1988 to 1998, Jolly worked in New York City as a stunt performer and special effects artist, garnering over 160 credits and doubling numerous actors including Adrien Brody, Norman Reedus and Freddie Prinze, Jr. During this time, Jolly had his first publication, the short story Dancing with Fire.

In 1998, Jolly moved to Northern California to become a helicopter pilot - a career that would last for eight years, flying tourists into the Grand Canyon, fighting forest fires in Northern Idaho, and teaching U.S. Army pilots in Fort Rucker, Alabama.

== Career ==
After his short play Howie's Last Words was accepted into the Summer Shorts Festival of the Miami City Theatre and given a full equity production in Miami and Fort Lauderdale, Jolly moved to Los Angeles to write full-time. He is the playwright of over 75 produced plays, many of which have been published. In 2006, Jolly was awarded a Nicholl Fellowship in Screenwriting by the Academy of Motion Picture Arts and Sciences. In 2013, Jolly was named an alternate for the Fox Writers Intensive. In 2017, he was awarded the Hammond House International Literary Prize for a Screenplay for Eight Ball, and in 2018 his play The Lady Demands Satisfaction won the Todd McNerney National Playwriting Award. In 2019, he was invited to participate in the Alley at Ucross writing retreat - a collaboration between the Alley Theatre and the Ucross Foundation. He has been a featured Artist at the Valdez Last Frontier Theatre Conference (2016, 2017, 2019 & 2021) He is a member of the Alliance of Los Angeles Playwrights, the WGAw Caucus and the Dramatists Guild, and is represented by Brant Rose Agency.

== Stage plays ==
- The Lady Demands Satisfaction (2017) - winner of the Joining Sword and Pen competition', winner of the McNerney National Playwriting Award,' winner of the KCACTF Region IV David Mark Cohen Playwriting Award' Next Stage Press
- Rising (2017) - published by YouthPLAYS
- The Ithaca Ladies Read Medea (2016) - premiered at Little Fish Theatre, Los Angeles,' published by Next Stage Press
- Thin Lines (2013) - Three one act plays Almost Christmas, Bailing Out and Thicker than Water published by Next Stage Press
- Long Joan Silver (2013) - a gender-crossing version of Treasure Island published by YouthPLAYS
- Snakes in a Lunchbox (2013) - published by YouthPLAYS
- The Four Senses of Love (2012) - In the collection The Best 10-Minute Plays of 2012 Smith & Kraus
- What the Well Dressed Girl is Wearing (2012) - published by YouthPLAYS
- Trash (2011) - winner of the Joining Sword and Pen competition, published by Next Stage Press
- Bath Time is Fun Time (2011) - published by YouthPLAYS
- Guilty Moments (2010) - A collection of short plays published by Original Works Publishing
- A Gulag Mouse (2009) - winner of the Joining Sword and Pen competition, and the Margaret Martin Award, (2010) winner Off-Broadway Playwrights competition, (2010) Finalist Woodward/Newman Drama Award. Published by Next Stage Press
- The Fine Print (2009) - Audience Favorite Award winner of the 2009 Los Angeles New Plays Festival and Competition
- How Blue is My Crocodile (2009) - published by YouthPLAYS
- Past Curfew (2008) - winner of the 2008 AOPW Fellowship Award, published by Next Stage Press
- The Christmas Princess (2005) - A new fairy tale. Published by YouthPLAYS

== Screenplays ==
- The Free Republic of Bobistan (2006)- Winner of the Academy of Motion Picture Arts and Sciences Nicholl Fellowships in Screenwriting.
- Where We Disappear (2019) - Feature directed by Simon Fink
- Eight ball (2017) - Winner of the Hammond House University International Literary Prize for a Screenplay
- The Hero (2011) - Winner of the Kay Snow Award in Screenwriting
- Under the Same Sky (2007) - Raz Entertainment
