= Christmas Do-Over =

2006 television film

- Written by: Trevor Reed Cristow; Jacqueline David
- Directed by: Catherine Cyran
- Starring: Daphne Zuniga; Jay Mohr
- Country of origin: United States
- Original language: English

Production
- Running time: 90 minutes

Original release
- Network: ABC Family
- Release: December 16, 2006

Christmas Do-Over is a 2006 Christmas television film starring Jay Mohr and Daphne Zuniga. It premiered on ABC Family on December 16, 2006 on their 25 Days of Christmas programming block. It is a remake of a previous 1996 television film, Christmas Every Day, but with an adult as the protagonist.

== Plot ==
Kevin, a lazy and selfish music composer, is a father divorced from his wife, Jill, but still obliged to celebrate Christmas with his former in-laws, especially Jill's father who never liked him to begin with. Shopping for a gift for his son at the last second, Kevin makes a purchase without even knowing what the gift is. He arrives at Jill's family's home to a mixed reception, welcomed only by his son Ben and Jill's Granny Conlon. Matters worsen as it is revealed that the gift he purchased for his son is an "easy bake oven". Jill's new boyfriend, Todd, a cardiologist, outshines him at every opportunity, dressing as Santa (which Kevin usually does every Christmas), providing Ben a better gift, and giving Jill a new car. Feeling depressed, Kevin tries to leave town, but finds his only route now blocked by a giant boulder. The family goes to the town's annual Christmas fair at which Jill's father, Arthur, once again loses a competition to his neighbor rivals, the Hendersons. Following the fair, the family sits down for dinner, and after various altercations between the adults, Ben wishes it was Christmas every day. Following this, the family, including a reluctant Kevin, go caroling, and afterwards, Todd proposes to Jill who accepts. The whole family celebrates, except for Kevin, who is too saddened by the events from the day, and for Ben who had held out hope that his parents would get back together. At the stroke of midnight, Kevin finds himself back at the front door on Christmas morning.

Kevin finds he is repeating the same Christmas Day over and over again. He attempts to explain this to Jill but she doesn't believe him. He makes multiple attempts to escape town only to be blocked by the giant boulder every time. Eventually, Kevin realizes his actions have no seeming long-term consequences as each day resets, and he chooses a selfish and immature approach to the day. His anger at the circumstances of the day gets the better of him and he starts a fight at the Christmas Fair, deeply upsetting Ben and Jill with his selfish behavior. Jill confronts him with this, but Kevin lets his own feelings known when he points out that when he tried to further his music career, it backfired greatly, resulting in Jill ditching out on him. Jill ends it in a huff since Kevin is clearly too selfish to ever see his own faults, but when Kevin hears her defending and explaining his anger to Ben, Kevin's conscience is pricked and he starts to realize his faults. After a heart-to-heart talk with Granny about his choices in life, Kevin admits he really wants to have his family back the way it was before the divorce.

Kevin relives Christmas Day while trying, with mixed results, to do make the day a success. He purposely sabotages Todd: swapping Todd's gift with his own, causing Todd to injure his leg so Kevin can be in the fair with Arthur, and purposely ruining Todd's attempts to propose to Jill. However, even after Kevin purchases nice gifts for Jill and her family, and he "wins" a lottery contest, Jill refuses his affections, declaring money and presents will not win her over. Upset, Kevin gives up, and again repeatedly tries to leave town only to be thwarted by either the boulder or time itself. During one risky attempt, his life is saved by Todd. Seeing that Todd is willing to postpone proposing to Jill, Kevin realizes how selfish and jealous he's been, and what a good person Todd actually is, perhaps deserving Jill more than he does.

Kevin finally embraces living Christmas over again, taking full responsibility for his faults and actions and allowing Todd to propose without interference, instead congratulating him. After a talk with Jill about his life and his new efforts to become a better man, Kevin once again relives Christmas, as while he is doing better it is still a chance to regain Jill's love, striving to be the best he can. He practices his dancing and helps Arthur win the Christmas fair competition; he re-designs the easy bake oven into a "monster melt" that greatly impresses everyone; and he sings a song during which Todd was meant to propose. Todd withdraws like a gentleman after seeing that Kevin is indeed a good man who deserves another chance with his family. Afterwards, he and Jill have a walk, and he admits to himself he's content with living the same day over as long as he can spend time with his family. Jill is touched and the two kiss, and as Midnight strikes, Kevin finds the cycle broken: he no longer has to relive Christmas.

During the end credits, Jill and Kevin get back together. The couple drive out of town together, with Ben; Kevin now a reformed man.

== Cast ==
- Jay Mohr as Kevin
- Daphne Zuniga as Jill
- Adrienne Barbeau as Trudi
- David Millbern as Todd
- Tim Thomerson as Arthur
- Logan Grove as Ben
- Ruta Lee as Granny Conlon
- Nathan Webnar as Short Man
- Christopher Brown as Little Boy
- Blaine Ross as Little Boy's Father
- Zach Cumer as Kid on the Street
- Michael J. Gaeta as Santa
- Jack Axelrod as Elderly Neighbor
- Jacob Chambers as Jesus Henderson
- Sonia Izzolena as Mary Henderson (as Sonia McDancer)

== See also ==
- List of films featuring time loops
- List of Christmas films
