= Simon Rakoff =

Canadian comedian (born 1960)

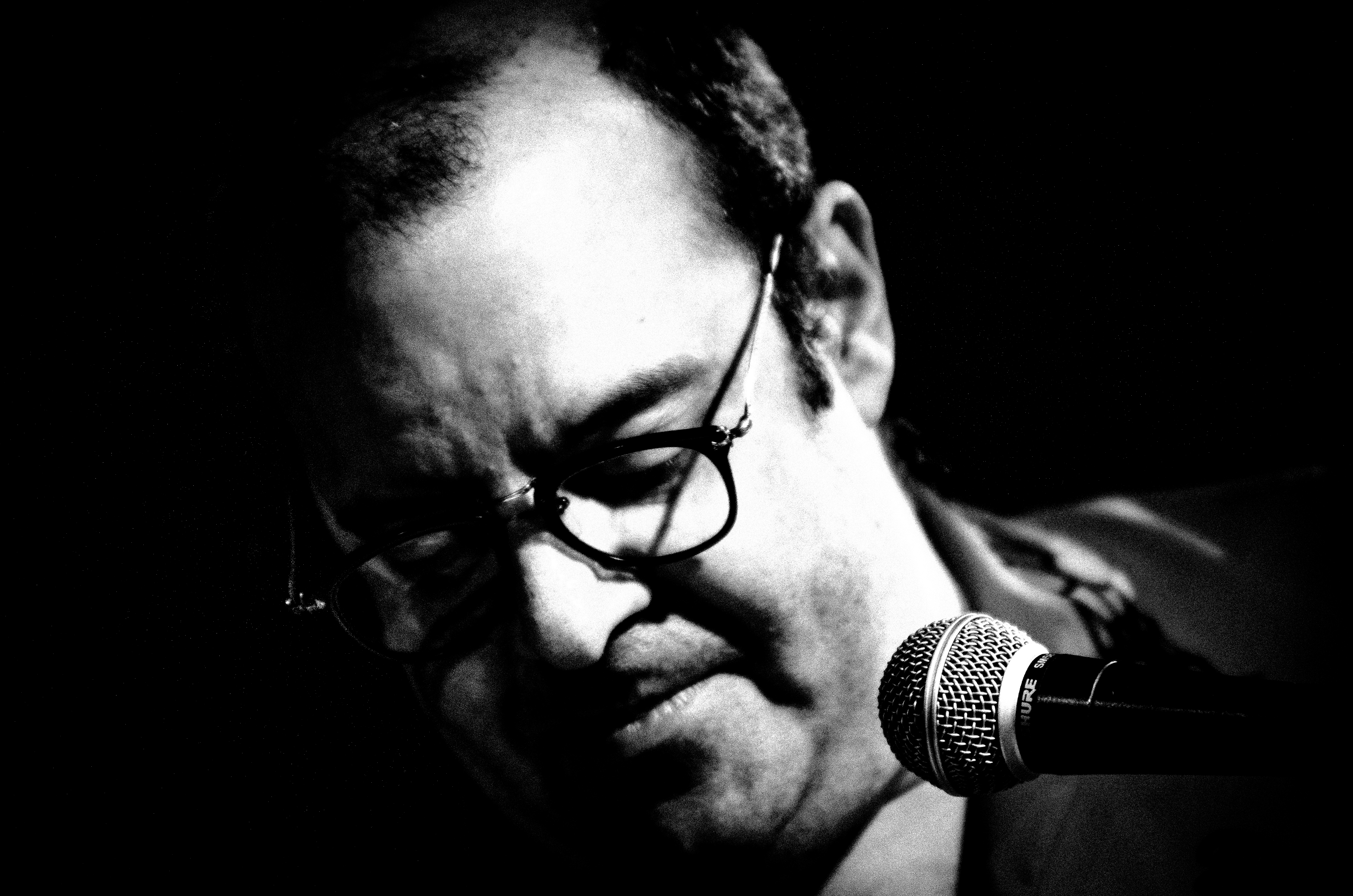
Rakoff performing at the El Mocambo in Toronto in 2014, photographed by Rob Trick

Simon Rakoff (born August 30, 1960) is a Canadian stand-up comedian, who began performing professionally in 1978.

A veteran of the Canadian comedy scene, he has performed in every province, including at the Winnipeg Comedy Festival and Just for Laughs. He has also been a frequent guest on CBC Radio on The Debaters and As It Happens, and held the record for the most appearances by a stand-up comedian on the late-night talk show Open Mike with Mike Bullard.

In 1999 he provided comedic political commentary for CTV's live coverage of the 1999 Ontario general election. In 2005 he was a guest on the debut episode of Unlocked, Andy Barrie's talk show on CIUT-FM during the Canadian Broadcasting Corporation staff lockout.

His comedy album Surrounded By Idiots was recorded and released in 2014. In the same year he also appeared on the comedy panel show Too Much Information.

He is the brother of humorist David Rakoff and the son of Vivian Rakoff, who was a chair of the psychiatry department at the University of Toronto.
