= Rosland Capital =

American precious metal asset management firm

- Rosland Capital logo
- Type: Private
- Industry: Financial services
- Founded: 2008; 18 years ago
- Founder: Marin Aleksov
- Headquarters: Los Angeles, California, United States
- Number of locations: 4 (Los Angeles, California, London, UK, Munich, Germany, Paris, France)
- Products: Precious metals including gold and silver
- Website: www.roslandcapital.com

Rosland Capital is an American precious metal asset management firm that in July 2026 filed for Chapter 11 bankruptcy protection. Its business model had the company selling gold and other precious metals in physical form as well as part of an IRA investment. Its employees were terminated in June 2026.

The company is headquartered in Los Angeles, California and is known for its television commercials starring actor William Devane. The company specializes in selling gold, silver, platinum and palladium.

Rosland primarily provides services in the United States, but also has offices in Europe.

== History ==
Marin Aleksov founded the company in 2008 and served as its CEO. Rosland also established precious metal-backed Individual retirement accounts (IRAs).

In July 2014, Rosland expanded into the United Kingdom, where the company was known as Rosland UK, and later moved into Germany as Rosland GmbH.

Rosland Capital's appointed Jeffrey Nichols as economic advisor and he often provided commentary for the company on the benefits of including gold in asset portfolios.

Rosland Capital have used a variety of well-known figures in it television online advertising. In 2014, Rosland prominently features actor William Devane in its television commercials. Rosland has said it chose Devane because he would resonate with its target demographic. Watergate conspirator and radio personality G. Gordon Liddy has also appeared in television advertisements for Rosland Capital.

In 2015, Rosland Capital released The Rosland Capital Guide to Gold, a book penned by Aleksov with John Watson. For each book sold, Rosland Capital said they would make a donation to the American Red Cross.

In 2016, Rosland Capital was appointed the worldwide distributor for Formula One's limited-edition gold and silver coins that commemorated the circuits of the 2016 FIA Formula One World Championship.

On July 2, 2026, Rosland Capital filed for Chapter 11 bankruptcy protection with plans to wind down and sell its remaining assets. At the time of the filing, the company reported approximately $49 million in deferred revenue associated with unfulfilled customer orders and another $11.8 million in outstanding customer buyback obligations. The filing followed hundreds of customer complaints alleging that Rosland had accepted payments without delivering the purchased precious metals or issuing requested refunds, while the company’s precious-metals IRA business and sales practices were under investigation by the U.S. Securities and Exchange Commission and the Attorney General of New York.

After declaring bankruptcy, the company and one of its agents, actor Erik Von Detten, were sued by an elderly couple who invested $2 million in gold coins but claimed the investment was worth much less. The gold coins were allegedly stored in a warehouse.

Following an auction, the court approved the sale of Rosland Capital’s assets to American Hartford Gold, LLC for $3,800,000 in cash, and the sale closed on October 2, 2026 [Docket No. 219].

== Products ==
Rosland's primary product is gold numismatic coins as a collectable investment in physical form and they argue that while the value of the U.S. dollar drops, gold has long served as a hedge against inflation and has performed well in uncertain economic circumstances.
