= The Year Without a Santa Claus (2006 film) =

2006 television film by Ron Underwood

- Genre: Comedy; Family; Fantasy
- Based on: The Year Without a Santa Claus by Phyllis McGinley
- Written by: Larry Wilson; Tom Martin
- Directed by: Ron Underwood
- Starring: John Goodman; Delta Burke; Michael McKean; Harvey Fierstein
- Music by: Deborah Lurie
- Country of origin: United States
- Original language: English

Production
- Executive producer: Mark Wolper
- Producers: Mark Wolper; Robert J. Wilson; Gideon Amir
- Cinematography: Don E. Fauntleroy
- Editor: Tina Hirsch
- Running time: 85 minutes
- Production companies: The Wolper Organization; Warner Bros. Television

Original release
- Network: NBC
- Release: December 11, 2006

The Year Without a Santa Claus is a 2006 made-for-television comedy family fantasy film, a live-action remake of the Rankin-Bass television special The Year Without a Santa Claus. The live-action version premiered on NBC December 11, 2006; a widescreen DVD was released on the following day.

== Plot ==
This remake follows the same basic concept as the original: Santa, disillusioned by children's lack of belief in him and in the spirit of giving, decides not to deliver toys this Christmas Eve, despite the arguments by Mrs. Claus and two of his helper-elves, Jingle and Jangle. They decide to provide Santa with some proof that children still believe and that they still deserve toys from Santa, so the elves visit the United States in search of Christmas spirit.

They face setbacks both in South Town, which is celebrating its annual Winter Festival, and in their dealings with the jealous, competitive Miser Brothers, who refuse to compromise long enough to permit a Christmas snow in the southern town. Finally, Santa's faith in children is renewed with the help of the boy Iggy Thistlewhite.

== Cast ==
- John Goodman as Santa Claus
- Delta Burke as Mrs. Claus
- Michael McKean as Snow Miser
- Harvey Fierstein as Heat Miser
- Ethan Suplee as Jingle Bells
- Eddie Griffin as Jangle Bells
- Chris Kattan as Sparky
- Dylan Minnette as Ignatius "Iggy" Thistlewhite
- Billy Slaughter as Nerd Elf

=== Cameos ===
- Carol Kane as Mother Nature
- Carson Kressley as the elf costumer
- Laura Schlessinger, "Dr. Laura", as herself
- Jack LaLanne as Hercules

== Reception ==
Paul Mavis, for Drunk TV, wrote, "The Year Without a Santa Claus is a nauseating, angry, joyless little holiday confection sure to poison any child unlucky enough to chance upon it. This hate-filled stocking stuffer has nothing but contempt for its intended audience, promoting the worst possible beliefs about people, while cloaking itself, incredibly, in the fake guise of a meaningful lesson about the holidays: the gall that the cretinous makers of this film have is really quite audacious.”

Lavanya Ramanathan of The Washington Post praised the performances of Griffin and Goodman, who "manage to give nice touches to their roles", as well as McKean, who "gives us the icy keeper Snow Miser with a pleasantly cunning twinkle." However, she was critical of the film overall and wrote that it "tells the same story without all the in-your-face hipness." Emily Ashby of Common Sense Media gave the film a 2 out of 5 star rating and called it a "disappointing mix of a slow plot, poor writing, and subpar visual effects."

== See also ==
- List of Christmas films
- Santa Claus in film
