= Best Christmas Ever (TV programming block) =

Arrangement of holiday films in the US

Best Christmas Ever is a seasonal program block on AMC, an American cable and satellite network. The block, launched in 2018, airs Christmas-themed television specials and feature films from late November until the day after Christmas.

Its primary direct competition is the more established 25 Days of Christmas on Freeform, on which much of the same programming had previously aired prior to 2018. In contrast to 25 Days of Christmas, Best Christmas Ever airs no original programming, relying entirely on reruns. A substantial portion of the lineup is licensed from Warner Bros. Discovery, which also airs the specials and films on its own networks, especially the former Turner networks, where they are aired on those networks' Christmas blocks.

== History ==
AMC had typically aired a rotating lineup of five to six Christmas movies during the holiday season. In 2018, the channel introduced a more extensive holiday lineup branded as Best Christmas Ever, running from November 26 to December 25, featuring a mix of popular Christmas and family films, along with other acquired specials. The schedule included notable acquisitions from Warner Bros., including Elf, National Lampoon's Christmas Vacation, The Polar Express, and 12 Rankin/Bass specials. The films had been recent mainstays of the 25 Days of Christmas schedule, with Elf in particular having received extensive airplay and high viewership during the event. Other programs included specials from DreamWorks Animation. As expected, AMC saw ratings gains over the holiday season; primetime viewership for the first two weeks of the event was up 40% year-over-year, airings of Elf and Christmas Vacation both peaked at 1.5 million viewers, and average viewership of feature films on Freeform fell by 36% year-over-year in the same period.

In 2019, Freeform responded to the loss of most of the Rankin/Bass library by acquiring cable rights to the two remaining specials from that company that had never been aired on cable: Rudolph the Red-Nosed Reindeer and Frosty the Snowman, sharing the rights with those two specials' former longtime free-to-air rightsholder, CBS, those specials will now be shared with fellow Universal-owned NBC (the original network that aired Rudolph).

In 2020, AMC expanded the "Best Christmas Ever" brand to its streaming service AMC+, which carries more adult-oriented content from AMC and partner networks We TV, Sundance TV, IFC and BBC America.

For 2021, AMC added hosting segments from Beverly D'Angelo, the co-star of National Lampoon's Christmas Vacation, and themed days throughout the block, some of which will include out-of-season films: movie marathons devoted to John Candy and Bill Murray, marathons devoted to holiday mischief ("Naughty List Marathon") and slapstick ("Holiday Hijinks"), and a Wonka Weekend featuring a rotation of both film adaptations of the book Charlie and the Chocolate Factory.

The block received a substantial paring back in 2023, as half of the Rankin/Bass specials and all of the non-Rankin/Bass specials were removed from the schedule. In their place were a series of marathons of non-Christmas movies interrupting the block for various days, including reprisals of the 2021 marathons featuring Candy and Murray (adding in a marathon for Reese Witherspoon) and a 1980s marathon. The 2023 block will also hold a celebration for the 20th anniversary of Elf's theatrical release. In addition to the AMC block, AMC+ and Shudder will also use the brand for horror and slasher films, including specials hosted by Joe Bob Briggs.

The 2025 lineup featured the addition of The Wizard of Oz, a film that had been exclusive to the Turner networks for the previous 25 years. The lineup also featured the returns of Scrooged and White Christmas to the lineup; in general, fewer films will be featured in 2025, with more frequent repeats. In a press release, AMC indicated "the Rankin/Bass holiday stop-motion collection" would continue to be featured but did not specify which specials on the main schedule; such shows, if they do air, will only be included in weekday daytime slots.

== Programming ==
Programs marked with † indicate a program shared with TNT and/or TBS.

The films featured on the programming block as of 2025 include:

=== Specials ===
- Frosty's Winter Wonderland
- Jack Frost (1979)
- The Life and Adventures of Santa Claus (1985)
- Rudolph's Shiny New Year

=== Films ===
- A Christmas Story†
- Christmas with the Kranks
- Deck the Halls
- Elf†
- Four Christmases†
- Fred Claus†
- The Great Outdoors
- Ghostbusters and Ghostbusters II
- Love the Coopers
- National Lampoon's Christmas Vacation
- National Lampoon's Vacation
- Planes, Trains & Automobiles (shared with Pluto TV)
- The Polar Express†
- Rudolph and Frosty's Christmas in July
- Scrooged
- Trading Places
- White Christmas
- The Wizard of Oz†
