= Gabe Khouth =

Canadian voice and television actor

- Born: Gabriel Forest Khouth; November 22, 1972; North Vancouver, British Columbia, Canada
- Died: July 23, 2019 (aged 46); Port Moody, British Columbia, Canada
- Occupation: Actor
- Years active: 1990–2019
- Spouse: Yuki Tani
- Children: 2
- Relatives: Sam Vincent (brother)

Gabriel Forest Khouth (November 22, 1972 – July 23, 2019) was a Canadian voice and television actor who worked for Ocean Studios in Vancouver, British Columbia.

== Early life ==
Khouth was born in North Vancouver. He was the younger brother of voice actor Sam Vincent. Khouth was born with tricuspid atresia and had heart surgery when he was 10.

== Career ==
Khouth had played several roles in anime, most notably Nicol Amalfi in Gundam SEED. Khouth also acted in the live-action punk cult film Terminal City Ricochet. Later on, he guest-starred as Hector on MacGyver, and then moved on to Stephen King's 1990 supernatural horror TV miniseries It, portraying Victor Criss. He appeared as Rodney in Ernest Goes to School. He also appeared in Santa Baby, in which he played Skip the Elf. He played Spinner Cortez on Hot Wheels Battle Force 5. He also played Sneezy/Mr. Clark in ABC's Once Upon a Time.

== Personal life ==
Khouth was married to Yuki Tani and had two children.

== Death ==
Khouth died on July 23, 2019 when he suffered from cardiac arrest while riding his motorcycle, which caused him to crash. He was 46 years old.

== Filmography ==
=== Animation ===
Year	Title	Role	Notes
2001	Star Ocean EX	Ashton Anchors	
2001	X-Men: Evolution	Arcade	Episode: "Fun and Games"
2002	Tokyo Underground	Ginnosuke Isuzu	
2002–2004	He-Man and the Masters of the Universe	Orko, Mekaneck, Oracle	
2003	MegaMan NT Warrior	ToadMan	
2003	Infinite Ryvius	Kreis Morate	
2004	Mobile Suit Gundam SEED	Nicol Amalfi	
2004	MegaMan NT Warrior Axess	BubbleMan	
2004	Inuyasha the Movie: Fire on the Mystic Island	Dai, Roku	
2005–2006	Being Ian	Various voices	3 episodes
2006	The Story of Saiunkoku	Hakumei Heki	
2006	Barbie in the 12 Dancing Princesses	Felix	
2008	Powerpuff Girls Z	Jessie Kido, Captain Eraser	
2009	Flash & Dash	Mike	
2009–2012	Hot Wheels Battle Force 5	Spinner Cortez, Quardian	
2013	Escape from Planet Earth	Hazmats	
2013	Barbie & Her Sisters in A Pony Tale	Albain	
2014	Pac-Man and the Ghostly Adventures	Do-Ug, Tip	
2014	Dr. Dimensionpants	Underwater Man, Underwater Dad	
2015	Barbie in Princess Power	Bruce	
2015	Bob's Broken Sleigh	Noodle	
2016–2017	Beyblade Burst	Ken Midori	
2017	Fruit Frenzy: Ninja Force	Peng	
2018	Nina's World	Squire	
2018–2020	Zoids Wild	Pach	Posthumous role

=== Live-action ===
Year	Title	Role	Notes
1990	It	Victor Criss	TV miniseries
2006	Santa Baby	Skip	Television film
2011–2018	Once Upon a Time	Mr. Clark, Sneezy	10 episodes
2015	Turkey Hollow	Buzz	Television film
2018	A Series of Unfortunate Events	Lou	Episode: "The Hostile Hospital: Part 1"
2020	Woke	Burnt Toast Man	Episode: "Rhymes with Broke"; posthumous release; final acting role
2021	Pennywise: The Story of It	Himself	Documentary film; posthumous release

=== Video games ===
Year	Title	Role	Notes
2003	CSI	Jack Riley	
2005	Mobile Suit Gundam SEED: Never Ending Tomorrow	Nicol Amalfi	
2009	Dynasty Warriors: Gundam 2	Hathaway Noa	
2010	Dead Rising 2	Johnny James	
