= List of films set around St. Patrick's Day =

This is a list of films set on or around St. Patrick's Day.

== Crime ==
- God Told Me To, a 1976
- Between the Canals, a 2010 Irish crime film written and directed by Mark O'Connor
- The Boondock Saints, a 1999 American crime film written and directed by Troy Duffy; opening scenes are set in an Irish neighborhood of Boston on St Patrick's Day
- State of Grace, a 1990 neo-noir crime film directed by Phil Joanou
- The Fugitive, a 1993 American crime film directed by Andrew Davis

== Drama ==
- Beau James, a 1957 biopic of Jimmy Walker
- Flight of the Doves, a 1971 British film directed by Ralph Nelson
- Fourteen Hours, a 1951 film noir
- The Fugitive, a 1993 American film adaptation of the original TV series, starring Harrison Ford; Dr. Kimble is seen eluding the US Marshals by joining the St Patrick's Day Parade in Chicago with the dyed green river clearly visible
- The Lost Weekend, a 1945 film noir directed by Billy Wilder
- The Quiet Man a 1952 film
- Patrick's Day, is a 2014 Irish drama film written and directed by Terry McMahon.
- St. Patrick: The Irish Legend, is a 2000 television historical drama film about the life of Saint Patrick (AD 387–463) who was born in Wales and who brought Christianity to Ireland.

== Fantasy ==
- Portrait of Jennie, a 1948 fantasy film directed by William Dieterle
- The Luck of the Irish, a 2001 Disney Channel Original Movie
- Leapin’ Leprechauns!, is a 1995 direct-to-video American film
- Spellbreaker: Secret of the Leprechauns, is a 1996 American direct-to-video film
- Darby O'Gill and the Little People, a 1959 Fantasy film written by H.T Karangh
- Luck (2022 film), a 2022 American
- A Very Unlucky Leprechaun, a 1998
- The Last Leprechaun, a 1998

== Horror ==
- Leprechaun (film), a 1993 American comedy horror film
- Leprechaun 2, a 1994 American comedy horror film
- Leprechaun 3, a 1995 American comedy horror film
- Leprechaun 4: In Space, a 1996 American comedy horror film
- Leprechaun in the Hood, a 2000 American comedy horror film
- Leprechaun: Back 2 tha Hood, a 2003 American comedy horror film
- Leprechaun: Origins, a 2014 American comedy horror film
- Leprechaun Returns, a 2018 American comedy horror film
- Leprechaun's Revenge, a 2012 Syfy film
- Maniac Cop, a 1988 slasher film directed by William Lustig
- Gold Coins, a 2021 horror short directed by Matthew Mark Hunter
- Unlucky Charms, a 2013 horror film directed by Charles Band
- Muck, a 2015 horror film
- Red Clover, a 2012 made-for-television horror movie directed by Drew Daywalt

== Musical ==
- Little Nellie Kelly, a 1940 musical film directed by Norman Taurog
- Finian's Rainbow (1968 film), a 1968 musical film

== Animated ==
- The Secret of Kells, a 2009 Irish-French-Belgian animated fantasy film about the making of the Book of Kells
- Song of the Sea (2014 film), (Irish: Amhrán na Mara) is a 2014 animated fantasy film directed and co-produced by Tomm Moore

== See also ==
- List of St. Patrick's Day television specials
- Holiday horror
