= Leprechaun (film series) =

American horror comedy film series

- The Leprechaun as depicted on the cover of the DVD box Leprechaun Pot of Gore Collection.
- Created by: Mark Jones
- Original work: Leprechaun (1993)
- Owners: Trimark Pictures (1993-2001); Lionsgate (2003-present)
- Years: 1993–present

Print publications
- Comics: List of comics

Films and television
- Films: List of films

Miscellaneous
- Distributor: Trimark Pictures (1993-2001); Lionsgate Films (2003-present)

Official website
- Leprechaun on Lionsgate

Leprechaun is an American horror comedy film series consisting of eight films. Beginning with Leprechaun (1993), the series centers on a malevolent and murderous leprechaun who resorts to any means necessary to protect and reclaim his gold. Warwick Davis plays the title role in every film except for the 2014 film Leprechaun: Origins, and the 2018 film Leprechaun Returns, in which the character is portrayed by Dylan Postl and Linden Porco, respectively.

On St. Patrick's Day, all Leprechaun films are played on Syfy.

== Films ==
Film	U.S. release date	Director(s)	Screenwriter(s)	Producer(s)
Leprechaun	January 8, 1993	Mark Jones	Mark Jones	Jeffrey B. Mallian
Leprechaun 2	April 8, 1994	Rodman Flender	Turi Meyer, Al Septien	Donald P. Borchers
Leprechaun 3	June 27, 1995	Brian Trenchard-Smith	David DuBos	Jeff Geoffray; Walter Josten; Henry Seggerman
Leprechaun 4: In Space	February 25, 1997	Brian Trenchard-Smith	Dennis A. Pratt	Jeff Geoffray; Walter Josten
Leprechaun in the Hood	March 28, 2000	Rob Spera	Story: William Wells; Alan Reynolds; Rob Spera & Doug Hall; Screenplay: Doug Hall & Jon Huffman	Bruce David Eisen; Mike Upton; Darin Spillman
Leprechaun: Back 2 tha Hood	December 30, 2003	Steven Ayromlooi	Steven Ayromlooi	Mike Upton
Leprechaun: Origins	August 22, 2014	Zach Lipovsky	Harris Wilkinson	Cami Winikoff; Mark Amin; Michael J. Luisi
Leprechaun Returns	December 11, 2018	Steven Kostanski	Suzanne Keilly	Adam Friedlander; Darren Cameron

The first two films were theatrically released. After a disappointing gross from Leprechaun 2, Vidmark released the following sequels direct-to-video.

Leprechaun story chronology
Original continuity
- Leprechaun (1993)
- Leprechaun 2 (1994)
- Leprechaun 3 (1995)
- Leprechaun in the Hood (2000)
- Leprechaun: Back 2 tha Hood (2003)
- Leprechaun 4: In Space (1997)
Reboot continuity
- Leprechaun: Origins (2014)
Alternate continuity
- Leprechaun (1993)
- Leprechaun Returns (2018)

=== Leprechaun (1993) ===
In 1983, Daniel O'Grady (Shay Duffin) has captured the Leprechaun (Warwick Davis) while in Ireland, takes his gold and smuggles it back to his home in North Dakota, unaware the Leprechaun has followed him. Confronting O'Grady and demanding his gold the Leprechaun is injured by O'Grady and sealed in a crate with a four-leaf clover, though before O'Grady can kill the creature he suffers a stroke. Ten years later the Leprechaun is accidentally released by Tory Redding (a then-unknown Jennifer Aniston) and her new friends, and goes on a killing spree in search of his gold, which Alex Murphy (Robert Gorman) and Ozzie (Mark Holton) had discovered. After the Leprechaun reclaims the bulk of his gold he is defeated when Alex shoots a four-leaf clover down his throat with a slingshot and Alex's older brother Nathan (Ken Olandt) blows up the well the Leprechaun falls into.

=== Leprechaun 2 (1994) ===
The Leprechaun seeks out a new bride in modern-day Los Angeles, one thousand years after an earlier attempt to claim a bride was foiled. Claiming a fussy teenage girl named Bridget (Shevonne Durkin), the descendant of his original choice of a wife, the Leprechaun holds her captive in his lair and terrorizes her boyfriend Cody (Charlie Heath), who had taken one of his gold coins. In the end Cody saves Bridget and defeats the Leprechaun by impaling him with a spike made of wrought iron, one of the few substances that can harm a Leprechaun.

=== Leprechaun 3 (1995) ===
The film begins with the Leprechaun, having been changed into a statue by a magical medallion, being sold to a Las Vegas pawn shop. Assuming his original form when the clerk removes the medallion, the Leprechaun kills him and goes on a rampage through Las Vegas in search of one of his wish granting coins, which is passed from hand to hand. The Leprechaun is ultimately defeated by college student Scott McCoy (John Gatins) and Scott's new girlfriend Tammy Larsen (Lee Armstrong), who blast his gold with a flamethrower, causing it to vanish and the Leprechaun to burst into flames.

=== Leprechaun 4: In Space (1997) ===
Taking place in the future, the Leprechaun abducts and begins courting snobbish alien princess Zarina (Rebekah Carlton), seducing her with promises of wealth. After being blown up by a group of marines who rescue Zarina, the Leprechaun is reborn on the marines' ship via exploding out of the groin of an unfortunate man, Kowalski. He then goes off in search of his stolen bride and gold, killing all those who get in his way. After being turned into a giant via an enlargement ray, the Leprechaun is ejected into space by the survivors of the massacre, Tina Reeves (Jessica Collins), Books Malloy (Brent Jasmer) and Sticks (Miguel A. Núñez, Jr.).

=== Leprechaun in the Hood (2000) ===
Set in Compton, California, the film has the Leprechaun being turned to stone once more, this time by pimp Mack Daddy O'Nassas (Ice-T), who uses the Leprechaun's mind-controlling magic flute to become a successful music producer. Years later, the Leprechaun is unknowingly changed back to flesh and blood by a trio of wannabe rappers led by Postmaster P. (Anthony Montgomery) who rob Mack Daddy, taking the Leprechaun's gold and the flute from him with the intent of using the objects to become successful. Hunted by both Mack Daddy and the Leprechaun, Postmaster P., after his friends and Mack Daddy are killed, is brainwashed into becoming a servant of the Leprechaun.

=== Leprechaun: Back 2 tha Hood (2003) ===
The film begins with the Leprechaun stalking Father Jacob (Willie C. Carpenter) trying to get his gold back, only to be dragged into the ground by demonic hands when the priest uses four-leaf clover laced holy water against him before dying from a heart attack. One year later the Leprechaun's gold is discovered by eighteen-year-old Emily Woodrow (Tangi Miller) and her friends, who use the gold to fulfill their wildest fantasies, unintentionally releasing the Leprechaun, who goes after Emily and the others to get his gold back, killing everyone who gets in his way. On the rooftop of the abandoned community centre Father Jacob had been building using the Leprechaun's gold, Emily and her boyfriend Rory Jackson (Laz Alonso) defeat the Leprechaun by knocking him and his gold off the roof and into a pool of wet cement below, where the Leprechaun sinks and becomes trapped.

=== Leprechaun: Origins (2014) ===
A reboot of the series, the film centers entirely on four American college students touring in Ireland. They come across the monolith from the opening scene, partially intending to study the history symbols but unaware that it is where all hell broke loose for the young couple. Hamish McConville (Garry Chalk), a friendly Irish man they meet at a bar when they stop, tells them the story of history about the village they are seeing - a mining centre that was used for cavern-obtained gold until it ran out, causing the population to decrease. An initially unseen force starts raiding the cabin they are left at by their transport provider, and they eventually realise that they are being sacrificed by Hamish and his son Sean (Teach Grant) to The Leprechaun (Dylan Postl) to atone for the decrease and eventual loss of the gold supply. The deadly and homicidal Leprechaun hunts the college students throughout their perilous struggles to survive its onslaught, which ends with it being killed by Sophie (Stephanie Bennett), the surviving student, and Hamish being killed by the creature in retribution for double-crossing them as the village's final sacrifice.

Lionsgate and WWE Studios (who worked together on See No Evil and The Condemned) were teaming up to reboot the film series around 2010s. Dylan Postl (who works under a leprechaun gimmick in WWE as Hornswoggle) starred in the role as Leprechaun. Until May 2013, there were no updates on the film's progress. Zach Lipovsky, a visual effects supervisor and a finalist on the reality game show On the Lot was hired to direct the reboot. The film was released under a VOD/Digital HD format on August 26, 2014 (following a limited release on August 22), with the DVD/Blu-ray released on September 30.

=== Leprechaun Returns (2018) ===
The film centers on the first leprechaun (Linden Porco) who escapes from the well into which he was barricaded 25 years prior by Tory Redding (Jennifer Aniston), her father and her friends who accompanied her at the O'Grady house, where he originally found them and terrorized them to get his gold back. In the present day, he returns to terrorize Laila Jenkins (Taylor Spreitler) and her sorority sisters as well as two men staying with them. Laila, a university student, is bought to her sorority home by Ozzie Jones and Tory is revealed to be Laila's mother who has died of cancer, having lived much of her life fearing the creature's return. After dropping Laila off at the house - the same house from 1993, now branded with the AU sorority symbol - he drops his phone while unloading her luggage, and upon returning to retrieve it, he is spat on from down the well by a splash of green water, some of which he swallows, and during his getaway he begins experiencing stomach pains, leading to the creature rebirthing himself and escaping. He kills Ozzie by tearing out of his torso before appearing at the house, killing two of Laila's sorority sisters and the two men. He is eventually electrocuted and ignited, causing the house to explode, but after Laila and Katie (Pepi Sonuga) escape and are driven back to the university campus, he is revealed to have reanimated and is last shown flagging down a truck for a drive to Bismarck, the capital of North Dakota.

Leprechaun Returns takes place 25 years after the original film. Linden Porco plays the title role, while Mark Holton reprises his role of Ozzie Jones from the first film. The film was released through digital and on demand on December 11, 2018.

=== Future ===
A crossover film with the Candyman film series was in development following the release and subsequent box office success of Freddy vs. Jason, tentatively entitled Candyman vs. Leprechaun, with a script treatment written and Davis set to reprise his role. However, the project stalled after Tony Todd refused to participate in such a project, stating that he had too much respect for the character he played, Candyman, to be involved with such a project.

In explaining why he did not reprise his role in Leprechaun Returns, Davis said he stopped appearing in horror films after the birth of his children: "You know what, we did six 'Leprechaun' films, and around Halloween people always watch them and love them. Horror is an interesting medium. I think it's different when you have kids; you look at horror in a slightly different way. Since I finished the Leprechaun films I had kids and I see the world through their eyes, and to be in a horror movie right now is probably not quite right. ... I will wait until my son turns 18 and then I'll do some horror again."

In March 2019, Darren Lynn Bousman, director of four films in the Saw franchise, expressed interest in a Leprechaun reboot with Davis starring. Bousman announced his intentions on Twitter, detailing a plot that would send the Leprechaun back to the Colorado Gold Rush. In 2021, Bousman reiterated his desire to direct a Leprechaun film while promoting Spiral: From The Book of Saw. In an interview with Bloody Disgusting, Bousman explained his plans further, stating that his potential film would not be a reboot, but "a more direct sequel to the Leprechaun franchise", and he "would demand that Warwick Davis come back". Bousman further declared that he would not try to change the tone of the series (à la Leprechaun: Origins) but would stick to the darkly comedic themes of the original six films: "I think that's what's so great about the Leprechaun films. They're silly, they're fun. They are violent, but it's a pure popcorn movie. I would not try to change the tone. I would make it equally as batshit, bonkers crazy. It would be between the first film and Back 2 tha Hood. It would be somewhere in that tonal frame. It got really ridiculous as they went on, but that ridiculousness is what made them fun."

In April 2022, Bloody Disgusting reported that Lionsgate was "actively seeking out pitches for the next Leprechaun movie". Nearly a year later in February 2023, franchise creator Mark Jones told Den of Geek that had discussed the idea of a new film with Davis and expressed interest in seeing the franchise adapted for television. "Warwick and I have talked on and off about it. He likes the idea of a Leprechaun in the Wild West. I think they should do a TV series where the Leprechaun travels the country looking for his gold." In July 2023, The Hollywood Reporter announced that Lionsgate had plans of rebooting the franchise again with Felipe Vargas directing. In March 2025, it was announced Vargas would no longer direct the film.

In August 2026, a new film written by Patrick Melton and Marcus Dunstan was announced, this time produced by Oren and Miles Koules.

== Cast and characters ==
List indicators
- This table shows the characters and the actors who have portrayed them throughout the franchise.
- A dark grey cell indicates the character was not in the film, or that the character's presence in the film has not yet been announced.
- A ^{Y} indicates an appearance as a younger version of a pre-existing character.
- A ^{P} indicates a photographic appearance only.
- A ^{V} indicates a vocal appearance only.

Characters	Films							
Characters	Leprechaun	Leprechaun 2	Leprechaun 3	Leprechaun 4 In Space	Leprechaun in the Hood	Leprechaun Back 2 tha Hood	Leprechaun Origins	Leprechaun Returns
Characters	1993	1994	1995	1997	2000	2003	2014	2018
The Leprechaun	Warwick Davis	Warwick Davis	Warwick Davis	Warwick Davis	Warwick Davis	Warwick Davis	Dylan Postl	Linden Porco
Tory Redding	Jennifer Aniston							Jennifer Aniston^{P} Heather McDonald^{V}
Ozzie Jones	Mark Holton							Mark Holton
Nathan Murphy	Ken Olandt							Mentioned
Alex Murphy	Robert Hy Gorman							Mentioned
Deputy Tripet	David Permenter							
Sheriff Roy Cronin	William Newman							
Dan O'Grady	Shay Duffin							
Leah O'Grady	Pamela Mant							
J.D. Redding	John Sanderford							Mentioned
Joe	John Voldstad							
Cody Ingalls		Charlie Heath						
Bridget Callum		Shevonne Durkin						
Mortimer "Morty" Ingalls		Sandy Baron						
William O'Day		James Lancaster						
Ian Joyce		Adam Biesk		Bruce Blain				
Black Leprechaun		Tony Cox				Mentioned		
Scott McCoy			John Gatins					
Tammy Larsen			Lee Armstrong					
Loretta			Caroline Williams					
Fazio			John DeMita					
Mitch			Michael Callan					
Art			Tom Dugan					
Gupta			Marcelo Tubert					
Tony			Roger Hewlett					
Princess Zarina				Rebekah Carlton				
Staff Sergeant 'Books' Malloy				Brent Jasmer				
Dr. Tina Reeves				Jessica Collins				
Private 'Sticks'				Miguel A. Nunez Jr.				
Private Delores Costello				Debbe Dunning				
Dr. Mittenhand The Mittenspider				Guy Siner				
'Mack Daddy O'Nassas'					Ice-T			
'Postmaster P.' Smith					Anthony Montgomery			
Emily Woodrow						Tangi Miller		
Rory Jackson						Laz Alonso		
Sophie Roberts							Stephanie Bennett	
Ben							Andrew Dunbar	
Jeni							Melissa Roxburgh	
David							Brendan Fletcher	
Hamish McConville							Garry Chalk	
Sean McConville							Teach Grant	
Lila Jenkins-Redding								Taylor Spreitler
Katie								Pepi Sonuga
Rose								Sai Bennett
Meredith								Emily Reid
Andy								Ben McGregor
Matthew								Oliver Llewellyn Jenkins

== Reception ==
Film	Rotten Tomatoes	Metacritic
Leprechaun	35% (17 reviews)	17% (17 reviews)
Leprechaun 2	6% (16 reviews)	-
Leprechaun 3	17% (6 reviews)	-
Leprechaun 4: In Space	38% (8 reviews)	-
Leprechaun in the Hood	33% (9 reviews)	-
Leprechaun: Back 2 tha Hood	20% (10 reviews)	-
Leprechaun: Origins	0% (8 reviews)	-
Leprechaun Returns	45% (11 reviews)	-

== Home media ==
The series has been released on DVD both separate and in collections. The entire film series was released on Blu-ray for the first time in a box set titled Leprechaun: The Complete Movie Collection on September 30, 2014.

== Other media ==
=== Comic books ===
Prior to the release of the original Leprechaun Trimark Pictures released an eight-page comic book prequel to the film. The story presented in the book is contradictory to the events of the film in several regards, such as depicting Daniel O'Grady as a lowly farmer and inhabitant of Ireland (instead of America) who obtains the Leprechaun's gold not by capturing the creature (as was stated in the film) but by following a rainbow.

A publishing company Bluewater Productions released a Leprechaun comic book series, which began in May 2009. Written by Zachary Hunchar and illustrated by Kris Carter the first arc of the series follows the Leprechaun (who is revealed to be named "Lubdan" and is also the king and last of his species) as he battles rival race the Clurichaun and travels the world in search of his gold, which was stolen and auctioned off online, with the reluctant help of the geeky Ethan Thomas and his friends. With only four issues released, the series was seemingly cancelled, as no new issues have been announced. Micheal Kingston was slated to write the second arc of the series.

Plans for a four-issue comic book crossover between the Leprechaun and Warlock series, which would have been written by Nick Lyons and released in late 2009, were made, but did not come to pass.
