= Leprechaun: Back 2 tha Hood =

2003 film directed by Steven Ayromlooi

- DVD cover
- Directed by: Steven Ayromlooi
- Written by: Steven Ayromlooi
- Based on: Characters by Mark Jones
- Produced by: Mike Upton
- Starring: Warwick Davis; Tangi Miller; Laz Alonso; Page Kennedy; Sherrie Jackson; Donzaleigh Abernathy; Keesha Sharp; Sticky Fingaz; Shiek Mahmud-Bey
- Cinematography: David Daniel
- Edited by: Stephen H. Sloan
- Music by: Michael Whittaker
- Distributed by: Lionsgate Home Entertainment
- Release date: December 30, 2003
- Running time: 90 minutes
- Country: United States
- Language: English

Leprechaun: Back 2 tha Hood (also known as Leprechaun 6) is a 2003 American black comedy-horror film written and directed by Steven Ayromlooi, and a standalone sequel to Leprechaun in the Hood (2000) with no returning characters or references made to that film. It is the sixth installment of the Leprechaun series, and the last entry to star Warwick Davis in the title role. The film has the villainous leprechaun rampaging through an urban area and killing anyone in his path while looking for his gold, which was stolen by a group of youths who are using it to fulfill their wildest dreams. It is the first film in the series to be released by Lionsgate.

== Plot ==
In ancient times, many Leprechauns are summoned by an ancient king to protect his gold. After the king's death, the Leprechauns return to their places of origin, all except one, who becomes corrupted through the ages and obsessed with the gold he still guarded.

In the present, Los Angeles pastor Father Jacob finds the gold and intends to use it to finance the building of a youth center. After a struggle, Jacob banishes the Leprechaun by splashing him with holy water laced with four-leafed clovers, summoning demonic hands to drag him underground, but dies of his injuries.

One year later, friends Emily Woodrow and Lisa Duncan have their fortune told by clairvoyant Esmeralda who warns they will soon attain great wealth, but it must be denied as it will come at a great price and summon a terrible evil. At a barbecue at the abandoned youth center site with Lisa, stoner friend Jamie Davis and ex-boyfriend-turned-drug dealer Rory Jackson, Emily falls through a hole and discovers the Leprechaun's gold, hidden by Father Jacob.

Splitting the treasure, the four friends use the gold to fulfill their fantasies, unaware they have released the Leprechaun. He stalks the group, impaling a guest at Jamie's party with a bong and retrieving one of his coins, prompting the police to arrest Jamie. At the beauty salon where Emily works, the Leprechaun kills a regular customer, Doria, on the massage table and attacks Emily. She escapes, warning Rory and the recently released Jamie, and they rush to find Lisa. In her home, Lisa is killed when the Leprechaun claws her in the stomach, and her friends find her body.

While Emily and Jamie want to return the gold, Rory does not and takes off with it; realizing Rory is gone, Emily is chased outside by the Leprechaun, but is saved when Rory has a change of heart and returns. The Leprechaun finds Rory's house and kills his profligate girlfriend Chanel by tearing out her jaw, reclaiming the gold she used to make a tooth, while Rory and Emily are harassed by Officers Thompson and Whitaker. When the Leprechaun appears and kills the officers, Emily and Rory escape and regroup with Jamie, only to be confronted by Rory's drug-dealing rivals, led by Watson and Cedric. Planning to kill Rory for infringing on their territory, Watson and his gang are disposed of by the Leprechaun, while Emily, Rory and Jamie drive off in Watson's car, seeking Esmeralda's help.

She advises using four-leaf clovers against the Leprechaun, and Rory laces hollow-point bullets with clovers Jamie finds in the marijuana Rory sold him earlier. When the Leprechaun arrives, Rory shoots him with the clover bullets, only for his gun to jam before he can finish him off. Rory and Emily have the chance to escape with the gold when the Leprechaun is distracted by Jamie, wounded by a baseball bat to the leg, and Esmeralda is defeated in a magical duel with the Leprechaun. Followed to the roof of the building, Rory tries fighting the Leprechaun and is knocked out. Before the Leprechaun can kill him, Emily throws some of his gold into wet concrete to get his attention and lures him into the basement of the building, where she tosses his gold into a furnace before knocking the Leprechaun inside.

Believing the Leprechaun dead, Emily returns to Rory, only for the Leprechaun to renew his attack. Knocking Emily off the roof and leaving her barely holding on, the Leprechaun taunts her, but is shot several times by Rory. He runs out of bullets but distracts the Leprechaun long enough for Emily to hit him with the chest of coins, sending him into the wet concrete below, where the Leprechaun sinks and becomes trapped with his gold. Afterwards, Emily and Rory renew their relationship, and along with Jamie, move on with their lives.

== Cast ==
- Warwick Davis as Lubdan the Leprechaun
- Tangi Miller as Emily Woodrow
- Laz Alonso as Rory Jackson
- Page Kennedy as Jamie Davis
- Sherrie Jackson as Lisa Duncan
- Donzaleigh Abernathy as Esmeralda
- Shiek Mahmud-Bey as Bryn Lee Watson
- Sticky Fingaz as Cedric
- Keesha Sharp as Chanel
- Sonya Eddy as Yolanda
- Beau Billingslea as Officer Thompson
- Chris Murray as Officer Whitaker
- Vickilyn Reynolds as Doria
- Willie C. Carpenter as Father Jacob

== Production ==
The film was originally set to take place on a tropical island in the midst of spring break, though executives at Lions Gate had director and writer Steven Ayromlooi change the location to an urban environment, like the previous entry in the series.

== Reception ==
The film holds an 20% approval rating on review aggregator website Rotten Tomatoes, based on 10 reviews. The film was included in Entertainment Weekly's "The worst movie sequels ever" article, writing, "if a movie could spark a race riot, this is it".

== Reboot and sequel ==
It would be 11 years before another Leprechaun movie was released, the 2014 film Leprechaun: Origins, the first film in the series not to star Warwick Davis in the titular role; the film is a reboot of the franchise. Another film, Leprechaun Returns, directly following up the first film from 1993, was made for television in 2018, also without Davis.

From as early as 2008 to as late as 2019, writer/director Darren Lynn Bousman has expressed interest in making another Leprechaun film, with the idea of placing the titular character in the Old West, with Warwick Davis starring.
