= Leprechaun (film) =

1993 American horror film

- Theatrical release poster
- Directed by: Mark Jones
- Written by: Mark Jones
- Produced by: Jeffrey B. Mallian
- Starring: Warwick Davis; Jennifer Aniston; Ken Olandt; Mark Holton; Robert Gorman
- Cinematography: Levie Isaacks
- Edited by: Christopher Roth
- Music by: Kevin Kiner; Robert J. Walsh
- Production company: Trimark Pictures
- Distributed by: Trimark Pictures
- Release date: January 8, 1993
- Running time: 92 minutes
- Country: United States
- Language: English
- Budget: $900,000
- Box office: $8.5 million

Leprechaun is a 1993 American horror comedy film written and directed by Mark Jones, and starring Warwick Davis in the title role, with Jennifer Aniston supporting. The film follows a vengeful leprechaun who believes a family has stolen his pot of gold. As he hunts them, they attempt to locate his gold to mollify him.

Originally intended as straight horror, Davis injected humor into his role, and reshoots added increased gore to appeal to older audiences. Leprechaun was the first in-house production at Trimark Pictures for theatrical exhibition; it earned a domestic gross of $8.556 million against a budget of roughly $900,000 and became a cult film. While reviews were negative, with critics lambasting both the direction and the characters and saying that the film is neither scary nor funny, the commercial success spawned a media franchise with a sequel, Leprechaun 2, released theatrically the following year.

== Plot ==
In 1983, Dan O'Grady returns home to North Dakota from a trip to his native Ireland, where he captured a leprechaun, who then gave him a pot of gold in accordance with the leprechaun code. After burying the gold, O'Grady discovers that the leprechaun has followed him home and murdered his wife. O'Grady uses a four-leaf clover to suppress the leprechaun's powers and trap him inside a crate. Before he can burn him, the leprechaun makes O'Grady suffer a stroke.

10 years later, J. D. Redding bought the O'Grady farmhouse and his teenage daughter, Tory, went to visit for the summer. Contract workers Nathan Murphy, his 10-year-old brother Alex and their dim-witted friend Ozzie Jones, help paint the farmhouse. In the basement, Ozzie hears the leprechaun's cry for help and accidentally brushes the clover off the crate, freeing the leprechaun. After failing to convince the others that he met a leprechaun, Ozzie spots a rainbow and chases it with Alex, believing there will be gold at its end. Ozzie finds a bag of one hundred gold coins and after he accidentally swallows one of them, they stash them in an old well.

At the farm, the leprechaun lures J. D. into a trap by imitating a cat, biting his hand and he is rushed to hospital. Alex and Ozzie visit a pawn shop to see if the gold is pure. The leprechaun later kills the shop owner and steals a go-kart to return to the farmhouse in, getting pulled over by a police officer on the way back for speeding. The leprechaun kills the officer and returns to the farmhouse to search for his gold. Leaving J. D. at the hospital, the group return to the farmhouse, finding it ransacked. Nathan checks outside and is injured by a bear trap set by the leprechaun.

After finding a shotgun in the farmhouse, they repeatedly shoot the leprechaun, to no avail. They attempt to flee the farm, but the leprechaun has sabotaged their truck's engine. Ozzie reveals that he and Alex found the gold and Tory recovers the bag from the well and gives it to the leprechaun. Counting his gold, the leprechaun discovers that he is missing one coin and resumes menacing them. Ozzie realizes he wants the coin he swallowed, but Tory refuses to sacrifice Ozzie to save the group and says they have no choice but to kill the leprechaun. Ozzie says O'Grady, who was taken to a nursing home after his stroke, might be able to help. The group distracts the leprechaun by throwing dirty shoes around, which he cannot resist shining, while Tory gets into her Jeep and drives to the nursing home.

At the nursing home, the leprechaun pretends to be O'Grady and after chasing Tory to an elevator, the leprechaun throws O'Grady down the shaft as Tory flees. Before dying, O'Grady tells her that the only way to kill the leprechaun is with a four-leaf clover, which grows in a patch outside the farm. At the farmhouse, Tory searches for a clover until the leprechaun attacks her; Nathan and Ozzie hear the screams and save her. Ozzie reveals that he swallowed the last coin to draw the leprechaun's attention. Before the leprechaun can kill Ozzie, Alex takes a four-leaf clover Tory has found, sticks it to a wad of gum and shoots it into the leprechaun's mouth, causing him to melt. The leprechaun falls into the well, but his skeleton climbs out. Nathan pushes the leprechaun back in and blows up the well with gasoline. As the cops arrive in the morning, the leprechaun vows his spirit will not rest until he recovers all of his gold.

== Cast ==
- Warwick Davis as The Leprechaun
- Jennifer Aniston as Tory Redding
- Ken Olandt as Nathan Murphy
- Mark Holton as Ozzie Jones
- Robert Hy Gorman as Alex Murphy
- David Permenter as Deputy Tripet
- William Newman as Sheriff Roy Cronin
- Shay Duffin as Dan O'Grady
- Pamela Mant as Leah O'Grady, Dan's Wife
- John Sanderford as J.D. Redding
- John Voldstad as Joe

== Production ==
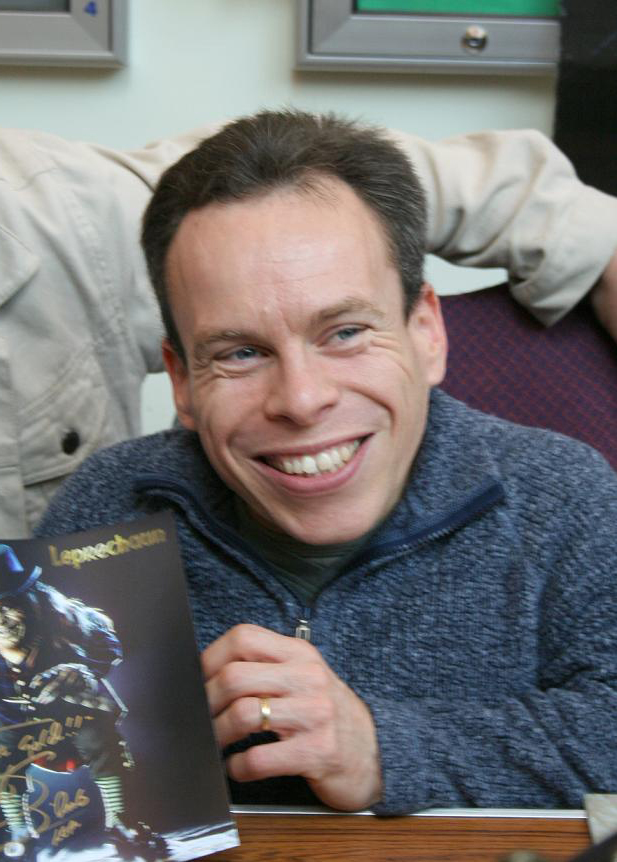
Warwick Davis signs Leprechaun merchandise at the Norwich Sci-Fi Film, Toy, and Collectors' Fair in 2006.

Mark Jones, the writer-director, had a career in American television shows. Desiring to make a film, he decided that a low-budget horror film was his best opportunity. Jones was inspired by the Lucky Charms commercials to create a leprechaun character, only his twist was to turn the character into an antagonist. Jones was further influenced by the film Critters, which featured a small antagonist. Jones brought the concept to Trimark, who were looking to get into film production and distribution. Leprechaun became the first film produced in-house by Trimark to be theatrically released. Entertainment Weekly quoted the budget at "just under $1 million". In an interview with Fangoria, Jones stated that he began writing the script in 1985 and spent a long time developing the Leprechaun character, which he initially envisioned as a "horrible, murderous creature", but which became a more comedic and developed character before filming began. Warwick Davis, who had experienced a dry spell after playing the protagonist in Willow, liked the script and was excited to play against type. Jennifer Aniston, an unknown at the time, impressed Jones, and he fought to have her cast. The movie was originally envisioned as a scary movie for children but the studio directors insisted that it would work better as an R rated movie.

Novelist Armistead Maupin was aware of the production, and included it in his novel Maybe the Moon, focusing on a little person based on his friend Tamara de Treaux.

Leprechaun was filmed at Valencia Studios, where Terminator 2: Judgment Day had recently finished production. Several violent scenes were filmed at Big Sky Ranch, where Little House on the Prairie and The Waltons were shot. Davis later said it felt "a little blasphemous". Davis performed most of his own stunts. For the scene where Davis chases Aniston in a wheelchair, Aniston had to run in slow motion so that Davis could keep up with her, as he had trouble manipulating the wheels. The film was initially more of a straightforward horror film, but Davis sought to add more comedic elements. Jones agreed with this tonal shift, and they shot it as a horror comedy. Several scenes had to be re-shot after the producers insisted that the film be made gorier to appeal to older audiences.

Gabe Bartalos performed the make-up effects. Trimark contacted Bartalos to produce a sample. Bartalos's early efforts were not to his liking, and he pushed the design in a more grotesque direction, as that was what he wanted to see on the screen as a horror fan. Bartalos's design impressed Trimark, and he got the account. Applying the make-up took three hours, and taking it off took another 40 minutes. Davis described the experience as "not a pleasant sensation". To pass the time while the make-up was being applied, Davis said he had bizarre conversations with Bartalos, with whom he got along well. Davis was conscious of the need to stay relaxed and not move, and he channeled his confidence that the make-up effects were properly applied to his acting.

== Release ==
Leading up to the film's release, Trimark engaged in an aggressive marketing campaign, partnering with the National Basketball Association, American Stock Exchange, and, after failing to secure deals with either corporate headquarters, individual franchisees of Domino's Pizza and Subway. Leprechaun opened on January 8, 1993, in 620 theatres and took in $2,493,020 in its opening week, ultimately earning $8,556,940 in the United States. Vidmark released it on VHS in April, and it sold over 100,000 copies. The film score was released on March 9 by Intrada Records. The film was released on DVD in August 1998. Lionsgate released a triple feature collection on March 11, 2008. All seven films in the series were released on Blu-ray in a collection in September 2014. The film is often broadcast on cable channels such as Syfy on Saint Patrick's Day.

In November 2025, the film had a VHS release by Lionsgate Films.

=== Sequels and reboot ===
Leprechaun was followed by five sequels: Leprechaun 2 (1994), Leprechaun 3 (1995), Leprechaun 4: In Space (1997), Leprechaun in the Hood (2000), and Leprechaun: Back 2 tha Hood (2003). In 2014, a reboot, Leprechaun: Origins was released. After Leprechaun 2's theatrical gross disappointed Trimark, Leprechaun 3 was released direct-to-video. Origins was theatrically released. Leprechaun Returns was released on DVD on December 11, 2018, serving as a direct sequel to the original film. The film stars Linden Porco as the Leprechaun, and Mark Holton as Ozzie Jones, who reprised the role from the first film, and directed by Steven Kostanski.

== Reception ==
On release, critical reception to the film was negative. Writing for The Deseret News, Chris Hicks said that the film should have been released direct-to-video. Also criticizing Trimark's release of the film, The Austin Chronicle's Marc Savlov called it clichéd, uninteresting, and an "utter waste of perfectly good Kodak film stock". Internet-based critic James Berardinelli called it "unwatchable" and not even enjoyably bad, and Matt Bourjaily of the Chicago Tribune wrote that the film "has brought new meaning to the term 'bad'". At the Los Angeles Daily News, Robert Strauss called it "as witless and worthless a horror film as could possibly be conjured". Pittsburgh Post-Gazette critic Ron Weiskind called the film incompetent and criticized the film's acting, lack of suspense, and production values.

Michael Wilmington of the Los Angeles Times called the cast "the usual all-formula grab-bag", and The Washington Post's Richard Harrington said the human actors are all bland. Berardinelli described the characters as "a group of morons who act like they flunked kindergarten" but said Aniston "might be competent" in a better film. Weiskind instead called Aniston's character a "Beverly Hills brat" who audiences will want to die. Of Davis, Harrington wrote that he "imbues a weak character with a strong presence", saying the film is only interesting while Davis is on-screen. Harrington concludes that the film is notable only for Davis' performance. Vincent Canby of The New York Times called the leprechaun "no more than dangerously cranky" and reminiscent of Chucky from Child's Play; Hicks also described the leprechaun as similar to Chucky. Wilmington wrote that while a killer Leprechaun logically follows a trend of gimmicky antagonists, it is still a bad idea.

Of the film's humor, Wilmington wrote that Leprechaun "isn't dumb enough to be fun". Hicks described the film's humor as "ill-advised slapstick", and Canby wrote that it is "neither scary nor funny". Berardinelli called the leprechaun's one-liners "more idiotic than pithy". Writing in the Chicago Sun-Times, critic Jeff Makos unfavorably compared the film's tone to that of Tremors, which he posited as an influence. Makos said Davis does his best to be funny, but the film has no funny jokes, making audience feedback probably more entertaining than the film itself. The use of Lucky Charms as humor also received commentary. Harrington wrote that Jones is "so bereft of inventive ideas that he refers to Lucky Charms cereal not once but three times", and Bourjaily criticized the Lucky Charms jokes as unfunny.

Berardinelli said director Mark Jones has no style evident in the film. Wilmington described it as a "dingy, drab, pointless little movie ... made without flair or imagination, seemingly enervated by its own bad taste and low intentions". Canby called the screenplay and direction amateurish, and Hicks wrote that Jones is bereft of ideas and should go back to his day job, describing the plot as "by-the-numbers killings with no rhyme or reason". Harrington wrote that the film "has major continuity and credibility problems". Strauss identified the theme as anti-greed but said the writing is "simultaneously prosaic and murky", causing Jones to miss his mark. Wilmington wrote that the leprechaun's cries for his gold reflect the filmmakers' cynical desire for box-office success. Sight & Sound described Leprechaun as a film which seems to have no concept of a target audience: "Jones wants this to be a lively romp for older kids in the mould of Time Bandits...but also wants to corner the lucrative horror market". The review concluded: "Unsuitable for adults or kids, this is ultimately for completists". Harrington called the make-up "quite evil-looking", though Strauss wrote that "effects are strictly so-so".

Rotten Tomatoes, a review aggregator, reports that 35% of 17 critics gave the film a positive review with an average rating of 4.4/10. On Metacritic, the film has a score of 17 out of 100 based on 7 critics, indicating "overwhelming dislike". A 2014 retrospective from Entertainment Weekly identified it as Aniston's worst role to date, and Aniston herself has expressed embarrassment over the film. In 2009, Tanya Gold of The Guardian selected it as one of her ten favorite scary films to watch on Halloween.

Disagreeing with his colleagues in 1993, Luke Y. Thompson of the New Times opined: "The perfect high-concept comedic slasher, and it's still Jennifer Aniston's best film to date".
