= Hornswoggle =

American professional wrestler (born 1986)

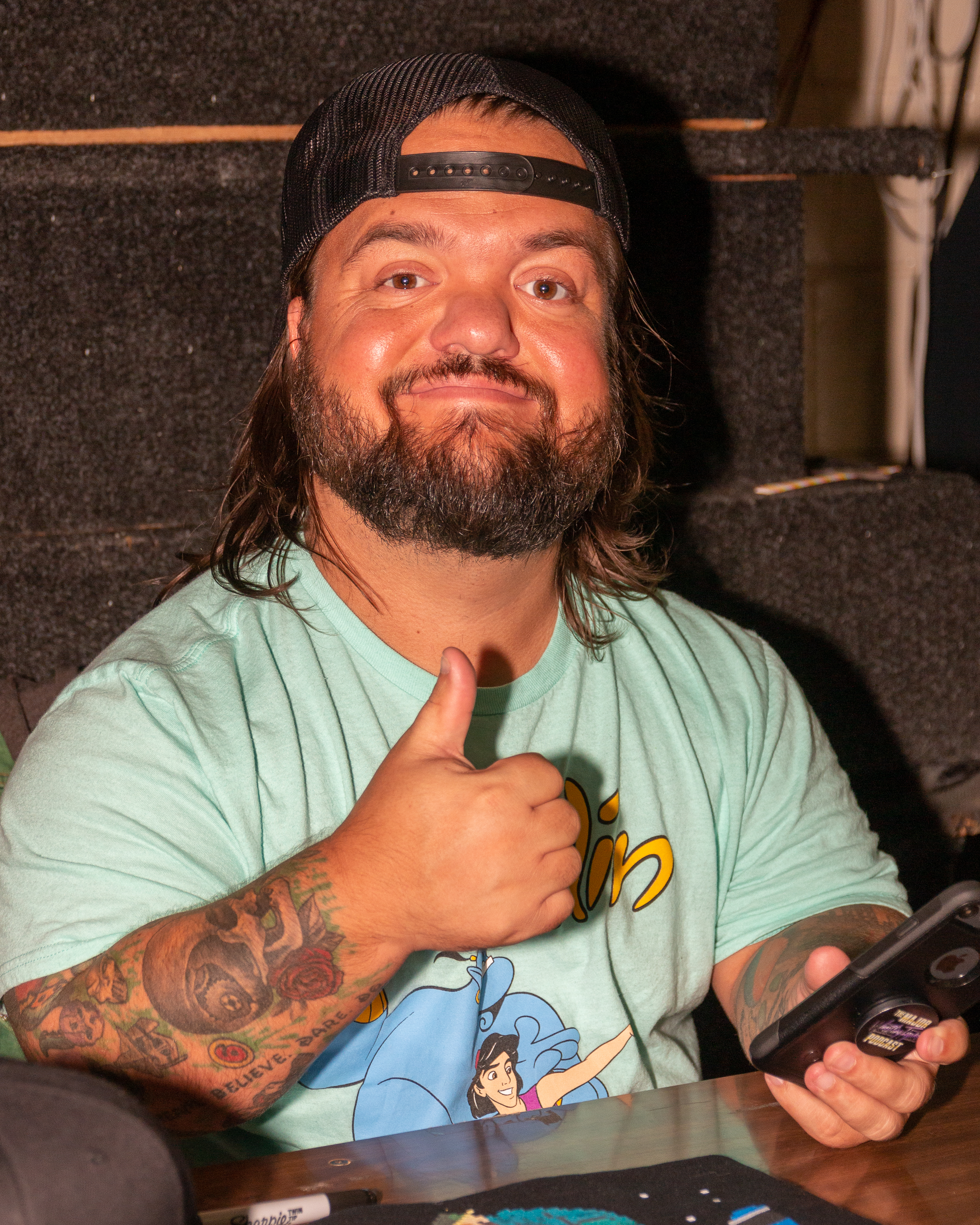
- Hornswoggle in 2019

Personal information
- Born: Dylan Mark Postl; May 29, 1986 (age 40) Oshkosh, Wisconsin, U.S.
- Children: 1
- Website: dylanpostl.com

Professional wrestling career
- Ring name(s): Hornswoggle; Little Bastard; Mini Delirious; Mini-Gator; Shortstack; Swoggle; La Vaca; La Vaquita; The Big Deal; Hardcore Wonder
- Billed height: 4 ft 5 in (135 cm)
- Billed weight: 142 lb (64 kg)
- Billed from: Dublin, Ireland
- Trained by: Ken Anderson
- Debut: 2004

YouTube information
- Channel: Dylan Postl
- Years active: 2006–present
- Genre: Professional wrestling
- Subscribers: 10.3 thousand
- Views: 688 thousand
- Last updated: December, 2025

Dylan Mark Postl (born May 29, 1986) is an American professional wrestler and YouTuber best known under the ring name Hornswoggle. He is signed to WWE under a legends contract, having previously performed for the company as an in-ring competitor. Hornswoggle currently performs on the independent circuit, sometimes under the tweaked name Swoggle. He is also known for his tenure in Impact Wrestling.

Postl debuted in WWE in 2006, allied with Finlay. He won the Cruiserweight Championship and was the final champion in its first stint. He was then revealed, in kayfabe, to be Vince McMahon's bastard son, and was exposed as the Anonymous Raw General Manager who had controlled the Raw brand from June 21, 2010, to July 18, 2011. He left WWE in 2016, and competed in Impact Wrestling from 2016 to 2019.

== Professional wrestling career ==
=== Early career (2004–2006) ===
Postl started his career in the Fox Valley Wrestling Alliance (FVWA), under the ring name Hardcore Wonder. In 2005, Postl appeared with National Wrestling Alliance territory NWA Wisconsin as "The World's Sexiest Midget" Shortstack, where he won the NWA Wisconsin X Division Championship. He also won the SSW Tag Team Championship with Devin Diamond, from The Pretty Hott Thangs (Ryan Kross and Josh Maxim) on May 19, 2006, in Oak Creek, Wisconsin. He relinquished the title after signing a contract with World Wrestling Entertainment.

=== World Wrestling Entertainment/WWE (2006–2016) ===
==== Finlay's leprechaun and Cruiserweight Champion (2006–2007) ====
On May 26, 2006, Postl made his televised debut in Bakersfield, California on SmackDown! as the character Little Bastard, the leprechaun partner of Northern Irish wrestler Finlay. After Finlay's victory over Paul Burchill, an extremely hyper, dirty, mysterious little man (Postl) in a leprechaun costume scurried out from under the ring and jumped on Burchill, laughing maniacally. Finlay pulled him off, only to slam him back down onto Burchill again and again. For the next few weeks, Postl continued to appear from under the ring after matches and attack Finlay's opponents. He soon became more and more aggressive and started attacking Finlay's opponents during matches, much to Finlay's dismay. At one point, he attacked Finlay, biting him when Finlay tried to stop him from attacking Gunner Scott. Little Bastard helped Finlay win the WWE United States Championship on the July 14 episode of SmackDown! when he tossed him a shillelagh to knock out the champion Bobby Lashley and pick up the win.

On February 23, 2007, the character's name was changed to Hornswoggle on WWE's website and all references to the name "Little Bastard" were removed. The meaning of “hornswoggle” is to swindle, cheat, hoodwink, or hoax. On the March 2 episode of SmackDown!, Hornswoggle attacked John "Bradshaw" Layfield (JBL) and Michael Cole. Afterward, Finlay intimidated Cole, warning him to refer to Little Bastard as "Hornswoggle." On the March 30 episode of SmackDown!, Hornswoggle helped Finlay beat Mr. Kennedy by performing a senton bomb off a stepladder onto Kennedy, essentially copying Kennedy's move, the Kenton Bomb. SmackDown! announcers Michael Cole and JBL immediately referred to the move as the "Lepreton Bomb". During the Money in the Bank ladder match at WrestleMania 23 on April 1, Kennedy hit Hornswoggle with a Green Bay Plunge off of a ladder when Hornswoggle tried to interfere on the behalf on Finlay. On the April 6 episode of SmackDown!, Finlay attacked Kennedy after his match and challenged him to a handicap match with Hornswoggle as Finlay's partner. Before the match, Kennedy apologized for hurting Hornswoggle. Finlay accepted his apology and formed a team with Kennedy.

Hornswoggle won the WWE Cruiserweight Championship after he pinned Jamie Noble in a Cruiserweight Open at The Great American Bash on July 22. The other participants and commentators were unaware that he was a participant in the match until the referee counted the pin and awarded him the belt. Hornswoggle then began a storyline feud with Noble over the belt. The next week on SmackDown!, Hornswoggle retained the title when he defeated Noble by countout. He attacked Noble in the following weeks by shoving a pie in his face, spraying him with a fire extinguisher, pushing him into Kane and causing him to get chokeslammed, and locking him in a large box.

==== Vince McMahon's illegitimate son (2007–2008) ====
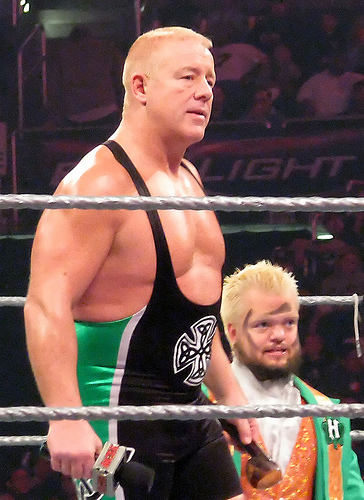
Finlay and Hornswoggle

On the September 10 episode of Raw, the storyline involving Mr. McMahon's illegitimate son culminated with the reveal that Hornswoggle was the illegitimate son. Hornswoggle's feud with Noble ended on the September 28 episode of SmackDown! when Acting General Manager Vickie Guerrero forced Hornswoggle to surrender the Cruiserweight Championship (which was later retired), citing that his status as Mr. McMahon's son and his diminutive stature would eventually jeopardize his well-being. Mr. McMahon began giving Hornswoggle matches against competitors that were much larger than him to show his son "tough love." Hornswoggle was placed into a match against The Great Khali at Survivor Series on November 18. At Survivor Series, Khali defeated Hornswoggle by disqualification when Finlay attacked Khali on Hornswoggle's behalf, turning both Hornswoggle and Finlay face. This was the first time that Finlay appeared together with Hornswoggle since the beginning of the Hornswoggle and Mr. McMahon storyline. At Armageddon on December 16, Finlay defeated Khali with the help of Hornswoggle.

On the February 18, 2008 episode of Raw, Hornswoggle had a scheduled steel cage match against his father, Mr. McMahon. During this match, Hornswoggle was whipped with a leather belt by Mr. McMahon. Finlay tried to get involved, but was attacked and handcuffed to the ring ropes by JBL. Mr. McMahon left the ring and allowed JBL to beat up Hornswoggle while an enraged Finlay watched. Following the attack, as a part of the storyline, WWE.com announced that Hornswoggle had suffered internal injuries, including bleeding of the brain and spinal trauma. On the February 25 episode of Raw, JBL claimed that Hornswoggle was not McMahon's son, but "in reality [was] the son of Finlay". The next week on Raw, Finlay confirmed Hornswoggle was indeed his son, then was forced to watch helplessly as JBL assaulted Hornswoggle in his hospital bed. Hornswoggle returned to live television at WrestleMania XXIV on March 30, accompanying Finlay to the ring for his Belfast Brawl with JBL, once interfering by hitting JBL with a kendo stick, allowing Finlay to get the shot in with the shillelagh. JBL won the match by hitting Finlay with the kendo stick in the shins and following up with the Clothesline from Hell. Original plans, however, were then revealed by Postl during an interview with Chris Van Vliet in May 2024, that Finlay was planned to face McMahon for a championship, but plans were scrapped before the feud between the two men had ended.

He made his in-ring return on the April 18 episode of SmackDown, defeating Matt Striker after a Tadpole Splash. As part of the 2008 WWE Supplemental Draft, Hornswoggle was drafted to the ECW brand along with Finlay. At Night of Champions on June 29, Hornswoggle and Finlay challenged John Morrison and The Miz for the WWE Tag Team Championship, but failed to win.

==== Association with D-Generation X (2009–2010) ====
On April 15, 2009, Hornswoggle was drafted to the Raw brand, without Finlay, as part of the 2009 Supplemental Draft. Hornswoggle then entered into a feud with Chavo Guerrero, in which they competed in a series of comedy gimmick matches each week determined by the weekly Guest Host for Raw (Texas Bullrope Match, Blindfold Match, Falls Count Anywhere, etc.). The program began on the July 7 episode of Superstars and continued on to Raw. Hornswoggle won every match in this feud.

Hornswoggle's next storyline began the October 26 episode of Raw, when after several weeks of wearing D-Generation X (DX) clothing, Hornswoggle received legal notification that he was no longer allowed to wear it. Later on in the night, he got his revenge by helping the Raw guest hosts, Kyle Busch and Joey Logano, put DX against each other and John Cena for the WWE Championship at Survivor Series on November 22. On the December 21 episode of Raw, Hornswoggle tried pressing charges against DX for assault on him, but later dropped them when DX agreed to make him DX's official mascot. On the January 18, 2010, episode of Raw backstage, Hornswoggle and Triple H confronted Big Show, The Miz and Jon Heder. Triple H made the match a six-man tag team match: DX and Hornswoggle against Big Show, The Miz and Heder which ended after Hornswoggle pinned Heder.

==== Brand switches and Anonymous Raw General Manager (2010–2011) ====
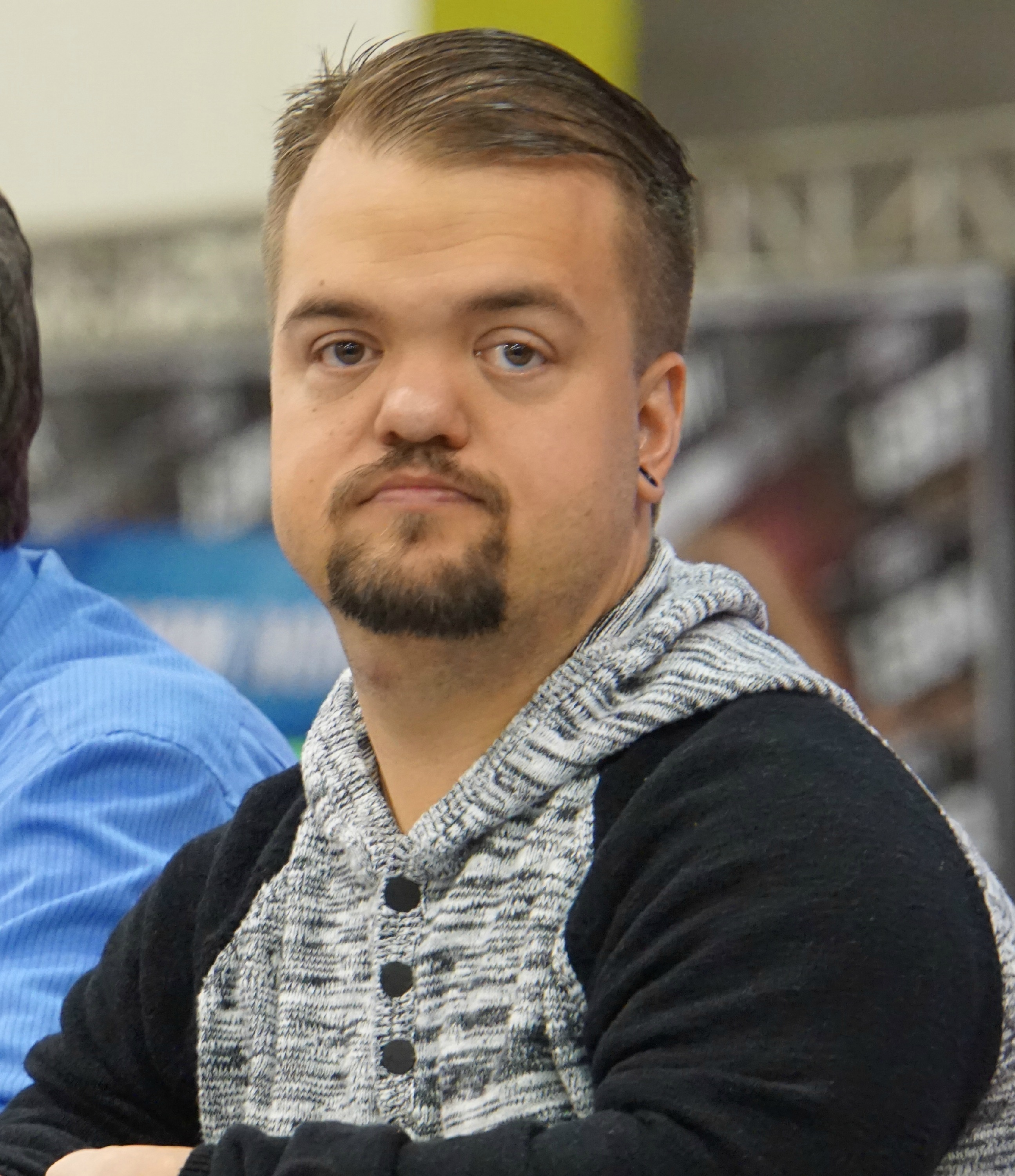
Hornswoggle in 2015

As part of the 2010 WWE Supplemental Draft on WWE.com, Hornswoggle was drafted back to the SmackDown brand. On October 8 episode of SmackDown, Hornswoggle was named the official mascot for the SmackDown team at Bragging Rights. On the July 9, 2012, episode of Raw, Hornswoggle was revealed as the Anonymous Raw General Manager, who previously ran the brand from June 2010 to July 2011.

On the season premiere of NXT Redemption, Hornswoggle was revealed as the pro for Titus O'Neil. After their tag team victory over Darren Young and Chavo Guerrero, Young attacked O'Neil. They later had a match against each other which Hornswoggle won. Hornswoggle was later confronted by O'Neil's previous NXT mentor, Zack Ryder. Ryder lured Titus out of the ring by pretending to attack Hornswoggle, but he quickly re-entered the ring and ambushed Titus as he climbed back in, cementing the victory. Weeks later, Hornswoggle was sent gifts from a secret admirer, assuming it to be Maryse. He responded by giving her gifts, only to be shot down. On July 26, AJ Lee revealed herself as the admirer by kissing him. AJ then accompanied Hornswoggle on both NXT and SmackDown. Sometime later, Hornswoggle became jealous of O'Neil hugging AJ and eventually sent her a letter ending their relationship, as he no longer wanted to be on NXT and preferred to stay on SmackDown.

==== Various alliances final storylines and departure (2011–2016) ====
On November 29, 2011, holiday edition of SmackDown, Hornswoggle won a battle royal, by lastly eliminating Sheamus, to receive a wish from Santa Claus (Mick Foley). With help from Sheamus, Hornswoggle wished for the ability to verbally communicate. With this ability, Hornswoggle became the special guest ring announcer for the David Otunga and Sheamus match on the following week's SmackDown. On January 6, 2012, episode of SmackDown he defeated Heath Slater in an Over-the-Top Rope Challenge. Later that month, Hornswoggle formed an alliance with Justin Gabriel, feuding with the former Intercontinental Champion Cody Rhodes and Heath Slater, he also accompanied Gabriel to the ring at the Elimination Chamber pay-per-view in a losing effort against United States Champion Jack Swagger. On March 23 episode of SmackDown, Hornswoggle was added to Theodore Long's WrestleMania XXVIII team as its personal mascot.

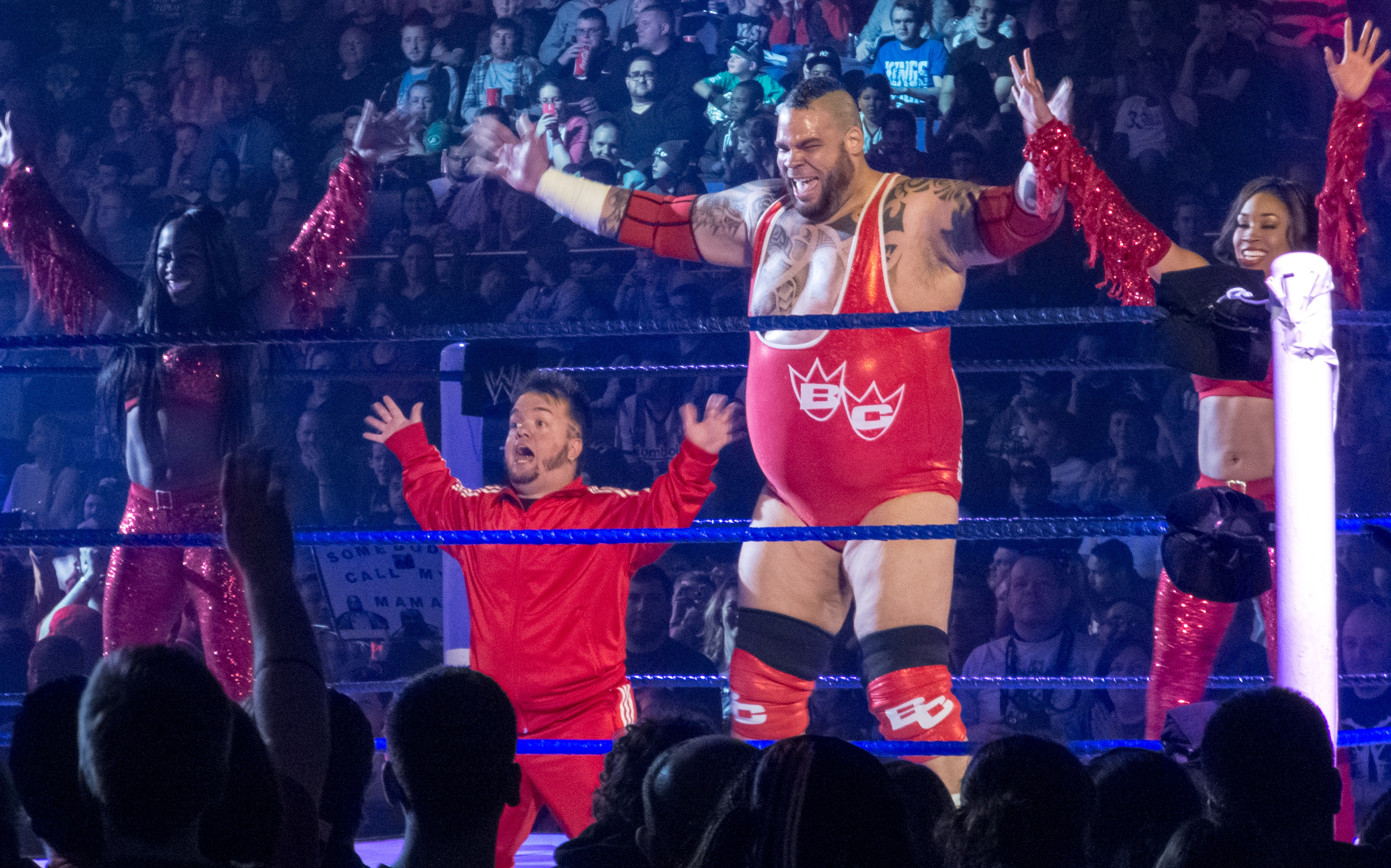
Hornswoggle dancing in front of Naomi, Brodus Clay and Cameron

He made a return on October 12, 2012, when he was found with a Randy Orton doll. Ricardo Rodriguez wrecked it and continued looking for the real Orton. After a period of inactivity, he returned to Raw in November, associating himself with The Great Khali and Natalya. He was injured (storyline) by Big E Langston on January 11, 2013, episode of SmackDown, after Khali and Natalya lost to Dolph Ziggler and AJ Lee. He returned on March 17 episode of Raw, to celebrate St. Patrick's Day, only to be interrupted by Bad News Barrett.

On the April 15, 2014, episode of Main Event, Hornswoggle turned heel after revealing himself as the mascot for 3MB (Heath Slater, Drew McIntyre and Jinder Mahal). In the following months, he faced El Torito numerous times, losing a WeeLC match at Extreme Rules (Postl says this was the best match of his career) and a hair match at Payback, resulting in his head being shaved. On June 12, 2014, McIntyre and Mahal were released by WWE, and ending 3MB. In July on Superstars, Hornswoggle accompanied Slater for his match with Adam Rose, and was kidnapped by the Rosebuds, who transformed him into a mini-Rose. On August 19 episode of Main Event, Hornswoggle turned face once again when he joined his former rivals, Los Matadores (including El Torito), as their second valet. He donned a cow suit and was referred to as La Vaquita (meaning "the little cow"), to complement El Torito, who was dressed as a tiny bull. Los Matadores went on to be defeated by Heath Slater and Titus O'Neil. That same week, on Superstars, his name was tweaked to La Vaca (meaning "the cow"), when he teamed with El Torito to defeat Slater and O'Neil. On September 29 episode of Raw, Hornswoggle reverted back to a heel and became Slater and O'Neil's (Slater-Gator) mascot, the Mini-Gator. After the breakup of Slater-Gator, Hornswoggle took time off from WWE television to undergo arthroscopic shoulder decompression surgery in March 2015.

On September 28, 2015, WWE announced Hornswoggle's thirty-day suspension for violating the company's Wellness policy. In his 2019 autobiography, Postl claimed he had been suspended because he had been unable to produce a urine sample for a mandatory drug test within a required three-hour window, rather than for testing positive for banned substances. The book contained a photo of what Postl contends was a test report for a hair analysis drug test performed on the day his suspension was announced that found no evidence of drug use.

After not having made any appearances in WWE since then, Hornswoggle was released from WWE on May 6, 2016.

==== Other appearances (2018–2020) ====
On April 27, 2018, Postl returned in the Greatest Royal Rumble event, eliminating Dash Wilder, before being eliminated himself by Tony Nese. On January 27, 2019, Postl made an appearance at Royal Rumble, chasing Zelina Vega during the Women's Rumble match. WWE contacted him to appear at Backlash 2020 in a pre-taped match between The Street Profits and Viking Raiders. Despite taping his part, his segment wasn't aired.

=== Independent circuit (2016–present) ===
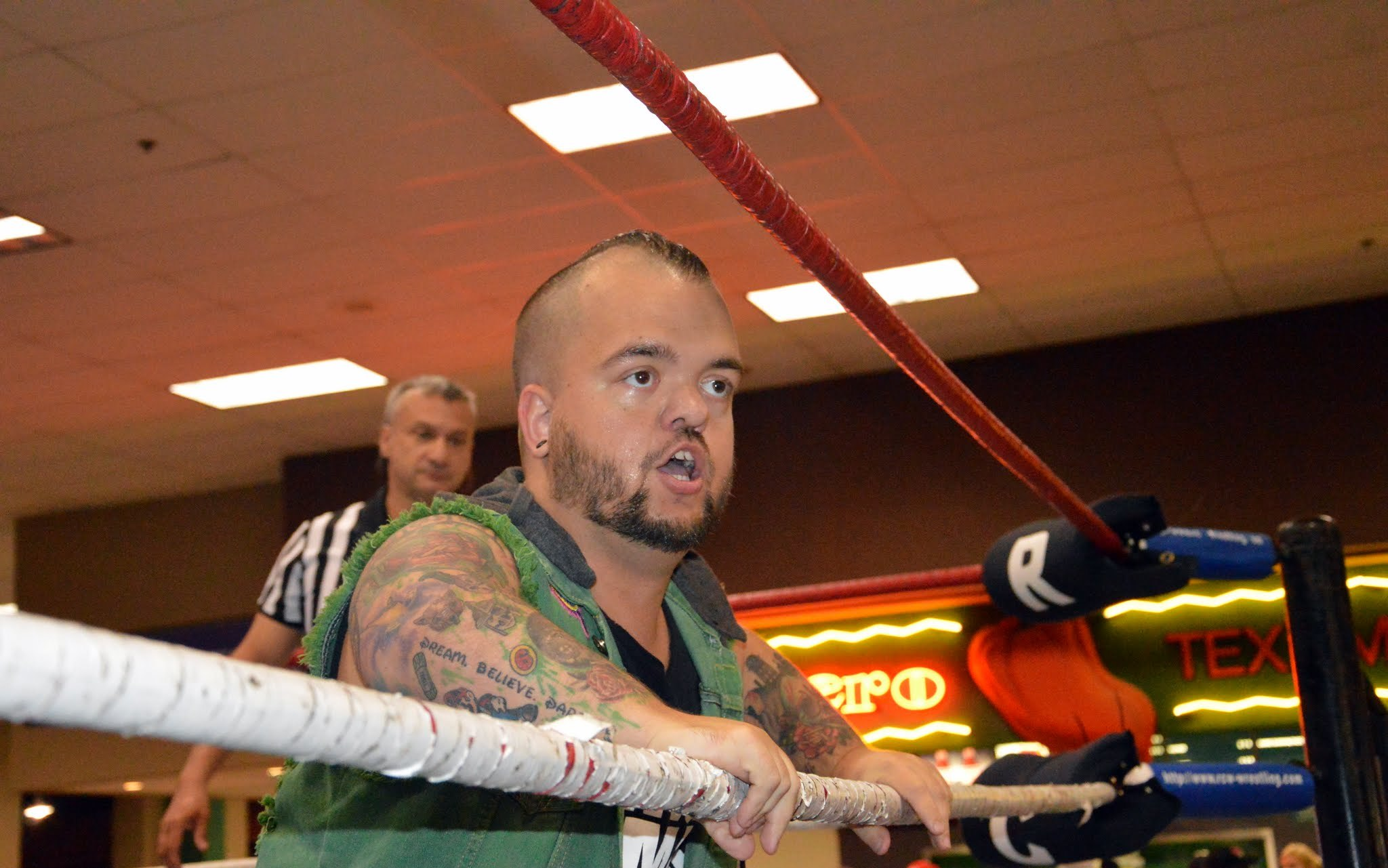
After Postl's tenure in WWE, he worked in the independent circuit.

Following his release from WWE, Postl returned to his hometown promotion ACW. Postl also signed to appear at a show co-promoted by Global Force Wrestling and WrestlePro under the ring name Swoggle and debuted for the promotion on June 11, facing Brian Myers. Swoggle won after Myers knocked down the referee and while the ref was down, Grim from Grim's Toy Show interfered against Myers with a full nelson slam. Swoggle did a tadpole splash on the incapacitated Myers and won by pinfall. On July 6, Chikara announced that Postl would be debuting for the promotion on July 23 under the ring name The Big Deal. On March 30 at WrestleCon, Postl, under the Swoggle ring name, defeated Grado.

=== Total Nonstop Action Wrestling / Impact Wrestling (2016–2020) ===
On the December 15, 2016, episode of Impact Wrestling, titled Total Nonstop Deletion, Swoggle made an appearance as the partner of Rockstar Spud in the Tag Team Apocalypto match. After turning on Spud in the Tag Team Apocalypto, Swoggle would square off with Lashley and knocked himself out when he attempted a spear on Lashley. He would then appear on January 5, 2017, episode of Impact Wrestling, where he would defeat Rockstar Spud, causing Spud to quit. On January 19, episode of Impact Wrestling, he would then team up with Robbie E in a losing effort against Aron Rex and Spud. On April 27 episode of Impact Wrestling, Swoggle was paying Rockstar Spud some attention and ruffled Spud's hair in what was intended to be an amusing gimmick with the fans - however Spud took exception to this and as he was chasing Swoggle, the situation concluded with Swoggle running up the entrance ramp, after losing his trousers (pants). Later that same show, Swoggle would viciously attack Spud using a hammer, causing unknown leg injuries. On June 1, Spud returned to Impact, entering through the crowd and attacking Swoggle with a hammer, like Swoggle had done to him. On November 13, 2017, his profile was officially removed from Impact Wrestling's website confirming his departure from the company.

Swoggle returned to Impact Wrestling at Bound for Glory 2019 where Swoggle competed in the Bound for Gold gauntlet match which was won by Eddie Edwards.

On October 24, 2020, Swoggle made another surprise return to Impact Wrestling at Bound for Glory 2020, where he competed in the Call Your Shot Gauntlet Battle Royal, which was won by Rhyno. On the October 27 episode of Impact, Swoggle helped Tommy Dreamer in defeating Brian Myers in a hardcore match by hitting Myers with a low blow. Later, it was announced that Myers would face Swoggle in a match at Turning Point. At the event he lost against Myers.

On November 24, 2020, Swoggle appeared as a parody of wrestler AJ Styles, and defeated Ethan Page with the help of Karl Anderson.

=== Ring of Honor (2019) ===
Swoggle competed November 3 at ROH Unauthorized, disguised as "Mini Delirious", the tag partner of Delirious. He unmasked after they lost to El Jefe Cobbo and El Villainisto, based on the match's stipulation. This was broadcast on TV on December 16.

=== All Elite Wrestling (2020) ===
Swoggle made a cameo on the November 18, 2020, episode of AEW Dynamite during The Inner Circle's trip to Las Vegas.

== Boxing ==
Postl made his boxing debut on April 24, 2021, at Rough n Rowdy’s event. He was defeated by Jeremy Smith.

== Autobiography ==
On May 1, 2018, it was announced that Postl was working on an autobiography with Ross Owen Williams, the writer of Bob Holly and Al Snow's autobiographies, and Ian Douglass, the writer of Dan Severn and Bugsy McGraw's autobiographies. It was advertised that the book would "delve into the physical and emotional challenges of being a little person in both a big person's world and, often, a large person's industry, as well as charting Dylan's emotional path to parenthood, and varied relationships within his own family." The book Life Is Short And So Am I was officially released by ECW Press on September 10, 2019, and it included forewords by Postl's close friends Kofi Kingston and Curt Hawkins.

WWE executive Stephanie McMahon posted her support for the book on Twitter on the day of its release. The book also received a public endorsement from Dolph Ziggler.

== Film ==
Postl starred in the film Leprechaun: Origins, a reboot of the Leprechaun film series. Hornswoggle regularly appeared in the WWE web series The JBL and Cole Show, until its cancellation in 2015.

In a 2022 interview regarding the controversy stemming from Peter Dinklage's statements towards the upcoming live-action remake of Snow White and the Seven Dwarfs where he denounced Disney for perpetuating stereotypes associated with people with dwarfism, Postl voiced his disagreement with Dinklage where he, along with other dwarf actors, accused Dinklage of virtue signaling and opined that Dinklage's condemnation of the Seven Dwarfs' portrayal, and Disney's replacement of them with anonymous "magical creatures" and portrayed by voice actors, would have deprived dwarf actors of a possible starring role in a film based on an established property, denouncing Dinklage as "hypocritical" and "selfish" due to his prior work as Tyrion Lannister in Game of Thrones, a character that Postl argued was created for a little person specifically.

=== Filmography ===
Year	Title	Roles	Notes
2014	Muppets Most Wanted	Russian Prisoner	
2014	Leprechaun: Origins	Tuatha Dé Danann/Leprechaun	credited as Dylan "Hornswoggle" Postl

Web series
Year	Title	Roles	Notes
2013	Wreckless Eating	Himself	1 episode
2013–2015	The JBL and Renee Show	Himself, The Bear	recurring role
2015	Swerved	Himself	3 episodes
2018	Where Are They Now?	Hornswoggle	1 episode

== Personal life ==
Postl is a single father and has a son.

== Other media ==
Postl made his video game debut as Finlay's manager in WWE SmackDown vs. Raw 2009 and subsequently last appeared in WWE SmackDown vs. Raw 2011.

== Championships and accomplishments ==
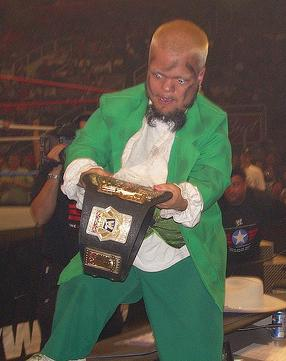
Hornswoggle was the final holder of the original WWE Cruiserweight Championship.

- ACW Wisconsin
  - ACW Tag Team Championship (2 times) – with Nick Colucci
- Absolute Intense Wrestling
  - AIW Tag Team Championship (2 times, current) – with PB Smooth (1) and The Duke (1, current)
- Attack! Pro Wrestling
  - Attack! 24:7 Championship (1 time)
- Black Label Pro
  - BLP Tag Team Championship (1 time) – with Ethan Page and Danhausen
- Create A Pro Wrestling Academy
  - CAP Tag Team Championship (1 time) – with Mark Sterling
- Community Pro Wrestling
  - CPW Jay Bee Dub Hardcore Championship (1 time)
- DDT Pro-Wrestling
  - Ironman Heavymetalweight Championship (2 times)
- Frontline Pro
  - Frontline Pro Tag Team Championship (1 time) – with Nick Colucci
- Great Lakes Championship Wrestling
  - GLCW Heavyweight Championship (1 time)
- Heroes And Legends Wrestling
  - HLW Minis Championship (1 time)
- NWA Wisconsin
  - NWA Wisconsin X-Division Championship (1 time)
- Pro Wrestling Illustrated
  - Rookie of the Year (2007)
  - Ranked No. 494 of the top 500 singles wrestlers in the PWI 500 in 2021
- Professional Wrestling Territory
  - PWT Tag Team Championship (1 time) – with Nick Colucci
- South Shore Wrestling
  - SSW Tag Team Championship (1 time) – with Devin Diamond
- Top Rope Belts
  - Top Rope Belts Championship (1 time)
- Wisconsin Pro Wrestling
  - WPW Tag Team Championships (1 time) – with MDCW and Nick Colucci
- World Wrestling Entertainment
  - WWE Cruiserweight Championship (1 time, final)
  - Mini Royal Rumble (2008)
- Wrestling Observer Newsletter
  - Worst Gimmick (2009)
  - Worst Feud of the Year (2009) with Chavo Guerrero
- WrestleCrap
  - Gooker Award (2007) Paternity storyline with Vince McMahon
  - Gooker Award (2009) Feud with Chavo Guerrero

== Luchas de Apuestas ==
Winner (wager)	Loser (wager)	Location	Event	Date	Notes
El Torito (mask)	Hornswoggle (hair)	Chicago, Illinois	Payback	June 1, 2014	
