= Leprechaun Returns =

2018 comedy horror directed by Steven Kostanski

- Promotional poster
- Genre: Horror; Comedy; Fantasy
- Based on: Characters by Mark Jones
- Written by: Suzanne Keilly
- Directed by: Steven Kostanski
- Starring: Linden Porco; Taylor Spreitler; Mark Holton; Pepi Sonuga; Sai Bennett; Emily Reid
- Music by: Andries Smit
- Countries of origin: Canada; United States; South Africa
- Original language: English

Production
- Producers: Adam Friedlander, Darren Cameron
- Running time: 92 minutes
- Production companies: Lionsgate; Blue Ice Pictures; Out of Africa Entertainment

Original release
- Network: Syfy
- Release: December 11, 2018

Leprechaun Returns is a comedy horror film directed by Astron-6's Steven Kostanski, from a screenplay by Suzanne Keilly. It is the eighth installment in the Leprechaun franchise and a direct sequel to 1993's Leprechaun which disregards the events of the previous five sequels, similarly to its contemporary Halloween. The film stars Taylor Spreitler as the daughter of Tory Redding from the original film, who encounters the title creature 25 years after her mother trapped it in a well (a retcon from the original film, in which Nathan and Alex Murphy knocked the leprechaun into the well and destroyed the well). Warwick Davis elected not to return as the Leprechaun, and Linden Porco took over the role for this film. It’s an international co-production between Canada, the United States and South Africa.

== Plot ==
Lila Jenkins arrives at Devil's Lake, North Dakota, to help greenify an old house owned by her sorority at Laramore University. Lila hitches a ride from Ozzie Jones and reveals that her mother, Tory Redding, died the year prior to cancer. Ozzie accidentally drops his phone while unloading Lila's luggage and heads back to retrieve it. He is sprayed by water from the old well, rebirthing the Leprechaun. He punches his way out of Ozzie's torso, collecting the gold coin that Ozzie swallowed 25 years ago.

Lila meets her sorority sisters Katie, an eco-friendly girl; Rose, the self-appointed leader of the group; and Meredith, a heavy drinker who brings over Katie's ex boyfriend Andy, and Matt, a wannabe filmmaker. After Meredith insults Lila's mother for her fear of monsters, Lila goes to bed and encounters visions of Zombie Ozzie. The next morning, Katie and Andy install a solar panel. The Leprechaun learns that his powers are weak due to his loss of gold, and determines that killing will solve his problems. That night, the Leprechaun reveals himself to Lila and Meredith, who takes pictorial evidence of the creature when Matt and Rose rebuff their suspicions. Andy also encounters the Leprechaun, who cuts him in half with the solar panel.

Meredith and Lila sneak inside the house to recover the car keys. Meredith locks Lila in the basement and reveals she made a deal with the Leprechaun to have Lila in hopes of leaving the rest alone. The group leaves Lila behind when Meredith says that Lila was killed, but learn of Meredith's true intentions. Meanwhile, Lila encounters Ghost Ozzie, who helps Lila learn of the Leprechaun's true weakness and of the basement's exit hole. When the Leprechaun catches up to the group on Matt's drone, they crash into a tree and run away, leaving Meredith behind when the Leprechaun reveals a loophole he created in order to continue the murders. The Leprechaun slows Meredith down using sprinklers, and kills her by impaling her mouth with a sprinkler faucet. Matt attempts to slow down the Leprechaun with his drone, but he overrides the controls and kills Matt with the drone blades.

Rose and Katie run into Lila and follow a treasure map that Ghost Ozzie helped Lila discover. The three discover a pick-up truck that contains the gold, but Rose reveals that she cashed in some of the gold to help finance the greenify project. To deceive the Leprechaun, Lila stuffs the pot with tampons and offers the gold back to the Leprechaun, but he realizes their true intentions. Lila traps the Leprechaun in a circle of iron objects (a leprechaun's weakness) in order to create a plan to defeat the Leprechaun. Katie restores the power while Rose creates clover juice. Lila stuffs a hose in the Leprechaun's mouth and fill him with the juice, causing him to explode. Rose offers to clean the house, but the Leprechaun multiplies himself using chunks of his body. Rose defeats most of the creatures, but the leprechauns outsmart her and impale her on a trophy. The Leprechaun forms again before Lila and Katie discover Rose's body.

Katie surrounds the Leprechaun's feet with gold and electrocutes him, blowing up the house in the process. Lila and Katie are covered in green slime and escape. The Leprechaun hitchhikes a ride on a chicken truck on its way to Bismarck, North Dakota so he can reclaim his gold.

== Cast ==
- Taylor Spreitler as Lila Jenkins, Tory Redding's daughter
- Pepi Sonuga as Katie
- Sai Bennett as Rose
- Linden Porco as The Leprechaun
- Mark Holton as Ozzie Jones
- Emily Reid as Meredith
- Oliver Llewellyn Jenkins as Matt
- Ben McGregor as Andy
- Heather McDonald as Tory Redding (voice)
- Pete Spiros as Mailman
- Leon Clingman as University Advisor

== Release ==
Leprechaun Returns premiered digitally via video on demand on December 11, 2018. The film made its worldwide television premiere on Syfy on March 17, 2019. It was then released on DVD and Blu-ray in June.

== Reception ==
On review aggregator website Rotten Tomatoes, the film has a 45% approval rating based on 11 reviews, with an average rating of 5.4/10. Meagan Navarro of Bloody Disgusting commented that Linden Porco more than adequately takes over the Leprechaun role and that Steven Kostanski's direction and Suzanne Keilly's script pulled off sufficiently gory kills and slapstick humor to satisfy fans of the series, but that the film is still overall ineffective. Navarro lamented that the most likable character, Ozzie, is killed off early on, leaving a cast of teen characters who are not interesting enough to root for, and felt the film failed to offer anything new. She gave it two and a half out of five skulls. The Hollywood News was more emphatic about the unlikability of the cast, concluding, "It's confusing and hard to work out whether we should be rooting for the girls or the leprechaun, as both sides are deplorable. A sorry sequel that limps to its conclusion, Leprechaun Returns is a confused and outdated muddle of a movie." They also criticized the misogynistic humor, the absurdity of the gory kills, and the flimsiness of the continuity links to the first film.
