= Quiet Kill =

- Directed by: Mark Jones
- Starring: Corbin Bernsen
- Release date: July 1, 2004
- Running time: 82 mins.
- Country: United States
- Language: English

Quiet Kill, also known as Nightmare Boulevard, is a 2004 film directed by Mark Jones. It stars Corbin Bernsen and Claudia Christian.

== Cast ==
- Corbin Bernsen as Jerry Martin
- Claudia Christian as Amy Martin
- Ron Perlman as Detective Sergeant Perry
- James Van Patten as Detective Jackson
- Vanessa Lee Evigan as Milly Martin
- Danica McKellar as Pet Shop Girl
