= Leprechaun 2 =

1994 film by Rodman Flender

- Theatrical release poster
- Directed by: Rodman Flender
- Written by: Turi Meyer; Al Septien
- Based on: Characters by Mark Jones
- Produced by: Donald P. Borchers; Mark Amin; Mark Jones; Michael Prescott
- Starring: Warwick Davis
- Cinematography: Jane Castle
- Edited by: Richard Gentner; Christopher Roth
- Music by: Jonathan Elias
- Production company: Planet Productions
- Distributed by: Trimark Pictures
- Release date: April 8, 1994
- Running time: 85 minutes
- Country: United States
- Language: English
- Budget: $1.5 million
- Box office: $2.3 million

Leprechaun 2 (also known as One Wedding and Lots of Funerals in the United Kingdom) is a 1994 American fantasy comedy horror film directed by Rodman Flender and written by Turi Meyer and Al Septien. The sequel to Mark Jones' Leprechaun (1993) and the second installment in the Leprechaun franchise, the plot centers on a leprechaun (Warwick Davis) as he hunts for a bride and for his gold-hoarding impulses.

Leprechaun 2 was released on April 8, 1994 to a box office total of $2.3 million. Panned by critics, it was the final installment to receive a theatrical release, until Leprechaun: Origins in 2014. A sequel, Leprechaun 3, was released direct-to-video the following year.

== Plot ==
In the year 994 in Ireland, the leprechaun celebrates his 1,000th birthday, on Saint Patrick's Day. The leprechaun intends to marry his slave’s daughter. In response to her father William O'Day's pleas, the leprechaun says that she will be his only when she sneezes three consecutive times without anyone saying "God bless you". He manipulates her to start sneezing. O'Day says "God bless you" to save her and is killed by the leprechaun, who promises to make a bride out of a descendant of O'Day on his next 1,000th birthday.

On St. Patrick's Day 1994, in L.A., a young man named Cody works with his Uncle Morty giving "dark side" tours, a scam that drives tourists around to the alleged gravesites of celebrities. Cody takes over the tour one day, when Morty is too drunk, forcing him to cancel a date with his girlfriend, Bridget, a modern descendant of the O'Day bloodline. The leprechaun emerges from one of the tour stops. He attacks and pulls out a homeless man's gold tooth before leaving in search of Bridget. Cody and Bridget stop at a race track where they were supposed to meet their friends. They enter the office and meet Ian, an employee at the track and a friend of Cody and Bridget. Bridget ditches Cody to stay at the race track with Ian and their friends. Cody is forced to leave the track and continue the tour, but while driving, he speeds through a red light and is arrested; Morty bails him out of the police station.

Meanwhile, Ian drops off Bridget and tries to convince her to spend time with him at her place, but she tells him she is still dating Cody and pushes him away when he grabs her, calling her a tease. While leaving, Ian sees Bridget calling for him to come to the garage; however, it is a trick by the leprechaun, who has disguised a lawn mower as Bridget. As Ian attempts to kiss "Bridget", the lawn mower slices him to death. Cody later visits Bridget and gifts her with flowers, and they reconcile. The leprechaun begins to make her sneeze. Cody attempts to say "God bless you", but a phone cord starts to strangle him before he can finish the phrase. Bridget tries to run to the door, but encounters Ian’s body hanging outside the door. The leprechaun then manifests to claim Bridget. After a scuffle with Cody, the leprechaun escapes with Bridget, but loses one of his gold coins after Bridget knocks a pot of gold from his hands. The coin falls into Cody's possession.

The leprechaun takes Bridget to his lair, but realizes a coin is missing. Meanwhile, Cody is considered a prime suspect in Ian's death and Bridget's disappearance. At his house, the leprechaun attacks, demanding his coin back. Morty saves Cody, and they escape to a bar. However, the leprechaun appears there. Morty challenges him to a drinking contest. Morty wins, but the leprechaun escapes, sobering up at an espresso bar and murdering the barista who mocked his height. Noting the leprechaun's weakness for cast iron, Cody and Morty go to the go-kart track office, where Bridget and Cody’s date was supposed to be, to empty the safe, which is made of cast iron, to capture the leprechaun inside.

As the leprechaun prepares to attack Morty, Cody traps him inside the safe by tricking him into jumping through the dog door leading into the office. However, Morty then locks Cody in a supply closet and demands three wishes from the leprechaun, in keeping with the tradition. Morty first wishes for his pot of gold. The wish is vaguely granted, the pot of gold manifesting inside Morty's stomach. The leprechaun says that he can remove it if Morty uses his second wish to free him from the safe. The wish does nothing, and then the leprechaun tells Morty that he has to open the safe manually, which he does. For his third and final wish, Morty wishes for the gold to be removed, which the leprechaun grants by tearing open his stomach and killing him. Cody flees the closet, but is apprehended by the security guard, who accuses Cody of being behind all the murders. The leprechaun then runs over the security guard with a custom go-kart. He attempts to kill Cody, who discovers that possession of the gold makes it impossible for the leprechaun to harm him. The leprechaun disappears, and Cody grabs an iron rod and drives to the leprechaun’s lair. He then enters the lair in search of Bridget.

There, Cody frees Bridget. They attempt to escape the labyrinth-like cave, but get separated. Cody finds Bridget, who asks Cody to give her the coin. He complies and she is revealed to be the leprechaun in disguise. The real Bridget reappears and begs the leprechaun to spare Cody. However, the leprechaun forces Cody to stab himself with a cast-iron stake. Cody's death is a ruse (he knew of the trick), as he actually gave the leprechaun a chocolate coin. Still immune to harm, Cody stabs the leprechaun with the stake, causing him to combust. Cody and Bridget escape, discard the coin, and kiss.

== Cast ==
- Warwick Davis as Lubdan the Leprechaun
- Charlie Heath as Cody Ingalls
- Shevonne Durkin as Bridget Callum
  - Durkin also plays O'Day's daughter in the prologue.
- Sandy Baron as Mortimer "Morty" Ingalls
- James Lancaster as William O'Day
- Adam Biesk as Ian Joyce
- Linda Hopkins as Housewife
- Warren A. Stevens as Wiggins, the security guard
- Arturo Gil as Pub Drunk
- Kimmy Robertson as Tourist's girlfriend
- Clint Howard as The Tourist
- Billy Beck as Homeless Man
- Al White as Sergeant Kelly
- Martha Hackett as Detective
- Tony Cox as Black Leprechaun
- Mark Kiely as Tim Streer
- Michael McDonald as The Waiter

== Release ==
In its U.S. opening weekend, the film played in 252 theaters and grossed $672,775. Its final domestic box office was $2.3 million.

== Reception ==
=== Critical response ===
Leprechaun 2 holds an approval rating of 6% on review aggregator website Rotten Tomatoes, based on 17 reviews.

Kevin Thomas of the Los Angeles Times wrote that it has better writing, production values, acting, and humor than the original. TV Guide stated that the film is an improvement over its predecessor, though "cynically contrived even by schlock horror standards". Marc Savlov of The Austin Chronicle critiqued that the film is a complete rehash of the original. Discussing the rationale for a Leprechaun sequel with Fangoria, Warwick Davis said, "Money's definitely the answer", alluding to a pay increase for his role as the titular villain.
