= Shadow: Dead Riot =

- Directed by: Derek Wan
- Written by: Michael Gingold; Richard Siegel
- Produced by: Csaba Bereczky; Carl Morano
- Starring: Tony Todd; Carla Greene
- Distributed by: Media Blasters
- Release date: 2006
- Running time: 91 minutes
- Country: United States
- Language: English
- Budget: $750,000

Shadow: Dead Riot is a 2006 horror film directed by Derek Wan and starring Tony Todd and Carla Greene.

== Plot ==
20 years earlier, Shadow, who was a satanic serial killer, faced execution for the crimes he committed at Ellis Glen penitentiary. However, something goes wrong and soon a riot ensues in the prison. For whatever reason, the guards, after killing all the prisoners to contain the riot, agree to not only bury them under the prison, but also cover up the entire situation. In the present day, Solitaire is committed to the prison, now rechristened as a Rehab center, for various crimes including street fighting and the like. Unfortunately she doesn't get a warm welcome into the community, and is forced to fight nearly every other female prisoner except for Emily, a pregnant cell mate of hers. Soon she's forced into solitary confinement, and within there she accidentally makes contact with Shadow's disturbed spirit. Prior to this, Shadow and Solitaire encountered each other, when Solitaire was a little girl, as Shadow desired to sacrifice her in a satanic ritual. As a result of his death however, Shadow never managed to do so. Now as Shadow realizes that Solitaire is not only alive but also within the prison, he gathers up an army of demonic zombies, who were the prisoners killed 20 years ago, to storm the prison, kill everyone else, and bring Solitaire to him.

== Cast ==
- Tony Todd as "Shadow"
- Carla Greene as Cassandra "Solitaire"
- Nina Hodoruk as Warden Danvers
- Michael Quinlan as Dr. Swann
- Cat Miller as Emily "Preggers"
- Andrea Langi as Elsa Thorne
- Tatianna Butler as "Mondo"
- William Newman as Male Guard
