= Mark Holton =

American actor

- Born: Oklahoma City, Oklahoma, U.S.
- Education: Northeastern State University
- Years active: 1983–2008; 2017–present

Mark Douglas Holton is an American actor. He is best known for his roles as Francis Buxton in Pee-wee's Big Adventure (1985), Chubby in the Teen Wolf film series, Ozzie Jones in Leprechaun and Leprechaun Returns, and for his portrayal of serial killer John Wayne Gacy in Gacy (2003).

== Early life ==
Holton was born in Oklahoma City, Oklahoma. He graduated from Okmulgee High School in 1976. He attended Northeastern State University in Tahlequah, Oklahoma.

== Career ==
Holton's professional breakthrough came with the role of Francis Buxton, Pee-wee Herman's nemesis in the blockbuster comedy Pee-wee's Big Adventure (1985). He found further fame as high school basketball player Chubby in the werewolf comedies Teen Wolf (1985), and Teen Wolf Too (1987). His mainstream visibility grew with supporting roles in The Naked Gun: From the Files of Police Squad! (1988), A League of Their Own (1992), My Life (1993), and Little Giants (1994).

Holton has been equally prolific in television, performing in episodes of The Young and the Restless, Seinfeld, MacGyver, Sledge Hammer!, Tim and Eric Awesome Show, Great Job!, Star Trek: Deep Space Nine, NCIS, and NYPD Blue. He also makes an appearance in the Ramones' music video for "Something to Believe In".

Following his cameo appearance in The Adventures of Rocky and Bullwinkle (2000), Holton refocused his attention on independent film and television projects. His first leading film role came through the direct-to-video horror Gacy (2003), in which he portrayed notorious serial killer and sex offender John Wayne Gacy.

Holton retired from performing in the late 2000s. He made a comeback with a second portrayal of B.M. Fahrtz in Tim and Eric Awesome Show Great Job! Awesome 10 Year Anniversary Version, Great Job? (2017). He returned to film acting in the made-for-television movie Leprechaun Returns (2018), a direct sequel to the original cult comedy horror Leprechaun (1993), reprising the role of Ozzie. He later appeared in the horror thriller film, Stream.

== Filmography ==
Year	Title	Role	Director	Notes
1983	What's Up, Hideous Sun Demon	Guy	Craig Mitchell; Robert Clarke	
1984	Webster	Various Characters	Joel Zwick	TV series (2 episodes)
1985	Pee-wee's Big Adventure	Francis Buxton	Tim Burton	
1985	Teen Wolf	"Chubby"	Rod Daniel	
1986	My Chauffeur	"Doughboy"	David Beaird	
1986	Stoogemania	Curly's Son	Chuck Workman	
1986	Modern Girls	Boss	Jerry Kramer	
1987	Teen Wolf Too	"Chubby"	Christopher Leitch	
1987	Under Cover	Denny	John Stockwell	
1988	Sledge Hammer!	Governor's Aide	Dick Martin	TV series (1 episode)
1988	The Naked Gun: From the Files of Police Squad!	Spectator	David Zucker	
1989	Day by Day	Proprietor	Matthew Diamond	TV series (1 episode)
1989	Easy Wheels	"Animal"	David O'Malley	
1990	Superboy	Johnny Casanova	David Nutter	TV series (1 episode)
1990	Grandpa	Unknown Role	Alan Ruffier	
1991	They Came from Outer Space	Frank	Dennis Donnelly	TV series (1 episode)
1991	MacGyver	A Guard	Mike Vejar	TV series (1 episode)
1992	A League of Their Own	Older Stilwell	Penny Marshall	
1993	Leprechaun	Ozzie Jones	Mark Jones	
1993	Flying Blind	George	Stan Daniels	TV series (1 episode)
1993	The Young Indiana Jones Chronicles	Alexander Woollcott	Syd Macartney	TV series (1 episode)
1993	My Life	Sam	Bruce Joel Rubin	
1994	Seinfeld	David	Tom Cherones	TV series (1 episode)
1994	Little Giants	Mr. Zolteck	Duwayne Dunham	
1995	Rumpelstiltskin	Huge Man	Mark Jones (2)	
1996	Star Trek: Deep Space Nine	Bolian	Kim Friedman	TV series (1 episode)
1997	Hijacking Hollywood	Officer	Neil Mandt	
1997	Sister, Sister	Conductor	Sheldon Epps	TV series (1 episode)
2000	The Adventures of Rocky and Bullwinkle	Potato	Des McAnuff	
2001	The Young and the Restless	Joe		TV series (2 episodes)
2003	Gacy	John Wayne Gacy	Clive Saunders	
2003	NCIS	Sergeant Linn	Bradford May	TV series (1 episode)
2004	NYPD Blue	Ned Applebaum	Jesse Bochco	TV series (1 episode)
2004	Rock Me Baby	Johnny "Hot-Pants"	Leonard R. Garner Jr.	TV series (1 episode)
2004	Madhouse	Mr. Hansen	William Butler	
2004	Return to Sender	Joe Charbonic	Bille August	
2004	Quintuplets	Santa	Andy Cadiff	TV series (1 episode)
2006	Hoboken Hollow	Weldon Brodrick	Glen Stephens	
2006	Dreamweaver	"Death"	Candance Gosch	
2007	Jane Doe: How to Fire Your Boss	Rob Ryan	James A. Contner	
2007	Days of Our Lives	Detective Morgan		TV series (1 episode)
2007	Tim and Eric Awesome Show, Great Job!	B.M. Fahrtz	Tim Heidecker; Jonathan Krisel; Eric Wareheim	TV series (1 episode)
2008	The Thirst: Blood War	Earl	Tom Shell	
2017	Tim and Eric Awesome Show Great Job! Awesome 10 Year Anniversary Version, Great Job?	B.M. Fahrtz	Tim Heidecker; Jonathan Krisel; Eric Wareheim	TV special
2018	Leprechaun Returns	Ozzie Jones	Steven Kostanski	
2024	Stream	Oswald Hanson	Michael Leavy	
