= Skinned Deep =

- DVD Cover
- Directed by: Gabriel Bartalos
- Written by: Gabriel Bartalos
- Produced by: Gabriel Bartalos
- Starring: Les Pollack; Aaron Sims; Kurt Carley; Linda Weinrib; Forrest J Ackerman; Eric Bennett; Warwick Davis
- Cinematography: Peter Strietmann
- Edited by: Christopher Seguine
- Music by: David Davidson; Captain Sensible
- Production company: Center Ring Entertainment
- Distributed by: Bedford Entertainment
- Release date: February 14, 2004 (United States)
- Running time: 97 minutes
- Country: United States
- Language: English
- Budget: $ 600,000 USD

Skinned Deep is a 2004 American comedy horror film written, produced and directed by Gabriel Bartalos in his directorial debut. The film stars Les Pollack, with a supporting cast of Aaron Sims, Kurt Carley, Linda Weinrib, Forrest J Ackerman, Eric Bennett, and Warwick Davis.

== Plot ==
An old man, while driving, is attacked by a man wearing a metal mask, "Surgeon General". Surgeon General runs the man off the road and kills him, before destroying the man's car. The sheriff and his men keep and investigate this crime scene.

While taking a family trip, the Rockwell family become lost on the highway. When their car gets a flat, father Phil goes to a convenience store to find help. A strange old woman invites them to stay with her while one of her sons fixes their car. She introduces the family to her strange sons: Plates, Brain, and Surgeon General.

When Mrs. Rockwell takes a picture of Surgeon General with flash, he kills her. Plates starts throwing plates at Phil, who is then murdered by Surgeon General. The Rockwell children, Tina and Matthew, escape through a window and are pursued by Surgeon General and Plates. Matthew taunts Surgeon General, who swipes at him and splits him in two. Tina is captured and knocked out. When she wakes up she is in a room covered in newspapers. She escapes out of a trap door. She finds a couple old bikers from part of a gang at the convenience store being served coffee by the old woman, and begs for help from the family. She is recaptured and all the gang are killed. Brain takes Tina to a park and shows her how to ride a motorcycle. Tina kills the strange family and escapes, heading to the sheriff's office for help. The sheriff there is familiar with the strange family; he is the patriarch. Tina screams.

== Cast ==
- Forrest J Ackerman as Forrey
- Eric Bennett as Phil Rockwell
- Jason Dugre as Brain
- Warwick Davis as Plates
- Karoline Brandt as Tina Rockwell
- Peter Iasillo, Jr. as Petey
- Kurt Carley as Surgeon General
- Bill Butts as Graine
- Jeremy Tuck as Michael Scott
- Neil Dooley as Pig Pen
- Joel Harlow as Octobaby
- Jim O'Donoghue as Sheriff

== Release ==
=== Reception ===
Dennis Harvey of Variety commended the film for its over-the-top set pieces, humor and break-neck pacing, calling it "funny and perversely monotonous". Dread Central's Steve Barton rated the film a score of two and a half out of five, commending the character designs, music, Davis's performance, and production values. Barton, however, criticized the film's clichés and derivative plot. Ryan Larson from Bloody Disgusting called it "one of the most completely bonkers horror films of the 2000s", praising the film's effects, vintage 1980s style, and energetic pacing.
