= Leprechaun: Origins =

- Theatrical release poster
- Directed by: Zach Lipovsky
- Written by: Harris Wilkinson
- Based on: Characters by Mark Jones
- Produced by: Chris Foss; Michael Luisi
- Starring: Dylan "Hornswoggle" Postl; Melissa Roxburgh; Garry Chalk; Brendan Fletcher
- Cinematography: Mahlon Todd Williams
- Edited by: Mark Stevens
- Music by: Jeff Tymoschuk
- Production company: WWE Studios
- Distributed by: Lionsgate
- Release date: August 22, 2014
- Running time: 90 minutes
- Countries: Canada; United States
- Language: English

Leprechaun: Origins is a 2014 horror film directed by Zach Lipovsky and written by Harris Wilkinson. The film stars Dylan Postl (better known by his wrestling ring name Hornswoggle), Melissa Roxburgh, Garry Chalk, and Brendan Fletcher. It is a reboot of Leprechaun (1993) and the seventh installment in the Leprechaun franchise. WWE Studios President Michael Luisi has described the film as "a little darker, a little more traditional horror than the Warwick Davis ones that people remember". It is an international co-production between Canada and the United States.

The film received a limited theatrical release on August 22, 2014, followed by VOD on 26 August and a DVD and Blu-ray release on September 30.

== Plot ==
A young couple, Catherine and Francois, attempt to escape a figure that catches and kills Francois before pursuing Catherine to a monolith in a grassland.

Four American college friends, Sophie, Ben, Jeni, and David, vacation in the Irish countryside at Sophie's suggestion. Their driver, Ian, leaves them at the monolith, where Sophie, a history bachelor, notices its symbol. At a local bar, they meet Hamish, an elderly villager who explains that the village once prospered from gold mined in a nearby cavern, but declined after the gold was exhausted. The friends accept a lift to a cottage from Hamish, despite being wary of him and his grumpy son, Sean.

That night, Jeni sees a figure outside and wakes the others, who discover that Hamish and Sean have locked them in. A creature enters through the fireplace and forcibly takes Jeni's gold earring, biting David's leg during their struggle. The four escape to the village hall and hide in its cellar. From a mythology book, Sophie learns that the creature is a Tuatha Dé Danann, also known as a leprechaun, which owns the gold the villagers took. In exchange, the villagers must sacrifice at least two humans annually as "compensation". The creature is repelled by the symbol carved into the monolith, which forms a barrier it cannot cross. A second barrier once protected its cavern, but mining caused the cave to collapse and allowed the creature to escape 15 years earlier. Hamish tells Ian that he suspects Sean is becoming disillusioned with the sacrifices.

Hamish confirms that the villagers sacrifice tourists rather than themselves. Sean, opposed to the practice, helps the four escape, while the creature kills Ian. They accept shelter from an elderly woman, Mary, who is secretly Hamish's accomplice. She ties them to trees as sacrifices. The creature rips out Jeni's golden tongue ring; David distracts it, but is mortally wounded. Before dying, he uses the severed rope to free the others. Returning to the cottage, Sophie and Ben attempt to trap the creature, but it tricks them into killing Jeni with their axes.

Sophie and Ben take Hamish's truck but are cornered in the village hall. The creature kills Ben by ripping out his spine. Hamish corners Sophie, intending to sacrifice her, but Sean intervenes and pushes his father into the cellar. The creature kills Hamish, devastating Sean. Sophie escapes in Hamish's truck but crashes while avoiding the creature. Pursued on foot, she distracts it with gold coins and kills it with Francois' knife from the prologue. She crosses the monolith to safety, while three leprechauns are revealed running through the tall grass before she continues her escape.

== Cast ==
- Stephanie Bennett as Sophie Roberts
- Andrew Dunbar as Ben
- Melissa Roxburgh as Jeni
- Brendan Fletcher as David
- Dylan "Hornswoggle" Postl as The Leprechaun
- Garry Chalk as Hamish McConville
- Teach Grant as Sean McConville
- Bruce Blain as Ian Joyce
- Mary Black as Mary
- Emilie Ullerup as Catherine
- Adam Boys as Francois
- Gary Peterman as Irish Farmer

== Marketing ==
WWE Studios' official YouTube channel premiered a clip from the film, with an introduction by Dylan Postl, in March 2014, in light of Saint Patrick's Day.

== Reception ==
Critical reception for Leprechaun: Origins has been predominantly negative. On the review aggregator website Rotten Tomatoes, 0% of 8 critics' reviews are positive, with an average rating of 2.0/10.

Common complaints include clichéd scripting and poor direction. Cliff Wheatley of IGN panned the film: "Slasher movies of this ilk come with a certain expectation of quality. But even the cheapest, most shoddy productions can manage some thrills, kills, and laughs with memorable characters and a cohesive plot when skilled filmmakers are at the helm. Leprechaun: Origins, unfortunately, offers none of these things".
