= William Newman (actor) =

American film, television and theatre actor

- Born: William MacLeod Newman; June 15, 1934; Chicago, Illinois, U.S.
- Died: May 27, 2015 (aged 80); Philadelphia, Pennsylvania, U.S.
- Occupation: Actor
- Years active: 1965–2006
- Spouse(s): Julia Taylon (1959–1981, divorced; 2 children); Margaret Ramsey (1983–2015, his death; 1 child)
- Children: 3

William MacLeod Newman (June 15, 1934 – May 27, 2015) was an American film, television and theatre actor.

== Biography ==
Newman was born in Chicago, Illinois, on June 15, 1934. He moved to Seattle, Washington, with his family in 1937. Newman graduated from Roosevelt High School in Seattle in 1952 and received a bachelor's degree from the University of Washington in 1956. He was the recipient of a Woodrow Wilson Fellowship, which allowed Newman to study advanced writing at Columbia University from 1958 to 1960. Newman also served in the U.S. Armed Forces during the late 1950s and early 1960s. Newman married the former Julia Tayon circa 1959. He later married Margaret Ramsey. He had three children: Liam, Katherine, and Matthew, who died in a fall in 1976. Newman became a Quaker in 1989. In 1965, Newman was hired as an actor at the Seattle Repertory Theatre. He acted at various theater companies throughout the country during his career, including the Baltimore Center Stage, the Minneapolis Guthrie Theater, the Denver Center Theater, and The Repertory Theatre of St. Louis. He also served as an artist-in-residence at Stephens College in Columbia, Missouri.

Newman also appeared in numerous film and television roles. His film credits included Brubaker (1980), The Postman Always Rings Twice (1981), Silver Bullet (1985), Act of Vengeance (1986), Playing for Keeps (1986), The Mosquito Coast (1986), Funny Farm (1988), Monkey Shines (1988), Hero (1992), Leprechaun (1993), The Stand (1994), Jury Duty (1995), Tom and Huck (1995), The Craft (1996), Santa with Muscles (1996), Brown's Requiem (1998), For Love of the Game (1999) and Teacher's Pet (2000). Newman also appeared in Mrs. Doubtfire (1993), opposite Robin Williams and Sally Field.

In 1991, Newman was cast as Kalin Trose in the Star Trek: The Next Generation episode, The Host. His last television credit was an episode of My Name Is Earl in 2006.

Newman died from vascular dementia at the Hayes Manor Retirement Residence in Philadelphia, Pennsylvania, on May 27, 2015, at the age of 80. His memorial service was held on June 27, 2015 at Old Haverford Friends Meeting in Havertown, Pennsylvania.

== Filmography ==
Film
Year	Title	Role	Notes
1976	Squirm	Quigley	
1980	Brubaker	Dunfield, Member of Prison Board	
1981	The Postman Always Rings Twice	Man From Home Town	
1984	Billions for Boris	OTB Cashier #2	
1985	Silver Bullet	Virgil Cuts	
1986	Playing for Keeps	Joshua	
1986	The Mosquito Coast	Captain Smalls	
1988	The Serpent and the Rainbow	French Missionary Doctor	
1988	Funny Farm	Gus Lotterhand	
1988	Monkey Shines	Doc Williams	
1988	Chattahoochee	Jonathan	
1992	Hero	Millionaire	
1993	Leprechaun	Sheriff Cronin	
1993	Fearless	Elderly Man	
1993	Mrs. Doubtfire	Mr. Sprinkles	
1995	Jury Duty	Judge D'Angelo	
1995	Pie in the Sky	Funeral Guest	
1995	Tom and Huck	Dr. Jonas Robinson	
1996	The Craft	Street Preacher	
1996	Santa with Muscles	Chas	
1996	No Easy Way	Restaurant Patron	
1997	Touch	Court Clerk	
1998	Brown's Requiem	Augie	
1999	For Love of the Game	Fitch	
2000	Devil in the Flesh 2	Dr. Thompson	
2006	Shadow: Dead Riot	Male Guard	

Television
Year	Title	Role	Notes
1979	Ryan's Hope	FBI Agent	Episode #1.1103; Episode #1.1104
1983	Chiefs	Mac McKibbon	Part 2
1986	The Last Days of Frank and Jesse James	Sheriff Timberlake	TV movie
1986	Act of Vengeance	Ezra Morgan	TV movie
1987	A Special Friendship	Quaker	TV movie
1988	The Murder of Mary Phagan	Episode #1.1; Episode #1.2	miniseries
1989	Dinner at Eight	Alf	TV movie
1991	Star Trek: The Next Generation	Kalin Trose	Episode: "The Host"
1991	Matlock	Bink	Episode: "The Witness Killings" Part 1 and 2
1992	Homefront	Mechanic	Episode: "No Man Loyal and Neutral"
1992	Eerie, Indiana	Father	Episode: "Mr. Chaney"
1992	Desperate Choices: To Save My Child	Dr. Edwards	TV movie
1992	Knots Landing	Judge Allen Rifkin / Judge Allan Rifkin	2 episodes
1993	Mad About You	The Waiter	Episode: "The Wedding Affair"
1993	Picket Fences	Arthur	Episode: "Be My Valentine"
1993	The Odd Couple: Together Again	Sylvester	TV movie
1994	Dead Man's Revenge	Doctor	TV movie
1994	The Stand	Dr. Soames	miniseries
1994	All-American Girl	Customer #1	Episode: "Mommie Nearest"
1995	Something Wilder	Unknown	Episode: "The Ex Files"
1995	VR.5	Unknown	Episode: "Simon's Choice"
1995	Pig Sty	Priest	Episode: "Leap Into an Open Grave"
1995	Wounded Heart	Jedediah	TV movie
1995	Women of the House	Dave	5 episodes
1995	Dr. Quinn, Medicine Woman	Abner Foley	Episode: "Halloween III"
1996	The Drew Carey Show	Hammond	Episode: "Drew Gets Motivated"
1996	Goode Behavior	Unknown	Episode: "Goode Golly, Miss Molly"
1997	Party of Five	Mr. Langen	Episode: "Promises, Promises"
1999	The King of Queens	Herb	Episode: "Crappy Birthday"
1999	L.A. Doctors	Harvey Feingold	Episode: "Where the Rubber Meets the Road"
1999	Dharma & Greg	Reverend Greeves	Episode: "The Very Grateful Dead"
1999	Diagnosis: Murder	Chester Chumley	Episode: "Gangland: Part 1"
2000	Cover Me: Based on the True Life of an FBI Family	Cal Caprita	Episode: "Bazooka Joe"
2001	Popular	Dr. Meyer	Episode: "The Brain Game"
2001	Angel	Old Demon Man	Episode: "Over the Rainbow"
2001	Philly	Judge Fuller	Pilot episode
2001–2002	The Tick	The Cape	3 episodes
2005	Days of Our Lives	Bookstore Clerk	Episode #1.10180
2006	My Name Is Earl	Unknown	Episode: "Larceny of a Kitty Cat", (final appearance)
