= Leprechaun in the Hood =

2000 film directed by Rob Spera

- Promotional poster
- Directed by: Rob Spera
- Screenplay by: Doug Hall; Jon Huffman
- Story by: William Wells; Alan Reynolds; Rob Spera; Doug Hall
- Based on: Characters by Mark Jones
- Produced by: Bruce David Eisen; Mike Upton; Darin Spillman
- Starring: Warwick Davis; Ice-T
- Cinematography: Michael Mickens
- Edited by: J.J. Jackson
- Music by: Nicholas Rivera
- Distributed by: Trimark Pictures
- Release date: March 28, 2000
- Running time: 90 minutes
- Country: United States
- Language: English
- Budget: $1.4 million

Leprechaun in the Hood (also known as Leprechaun 5 or Leprechaun 5: In the Hood) is a 2000 American black comedy-horror film directed by Rob Spera and written by Doug Hall and Jon Huffman. It serves as the fifth installment in the Leprechaun franchise. The film follows Warwick Davis as the evil leprechaun in his search for his stolen magic flute, killing anyone who gets in his way.

The film was released direct-to-video on March 28, 2000, and is the last entry to be released by Trimark Pictures, which was folded into Lionsgate Films in 2001. It was followed by Leprechaun: Back 2 tha Hood (2003).

== Plot ==
In Los Angeles, California, Mack Daddy O'Nasses and Slug discover a hidden room full of gold, along with a leprechaun that has been kept as a statue by a medallion on its neck. Mack Daddy takes a gold flute, but Slug removes the medallion, freeing the Leprechaun who then kills Slug. Mack Daddy manages to trap the Leprechaun with the medallion again before leaving with the flute. Twenty years later, wannabe rap artists Postmaster P., Stray Bullet and Butch have their speaker destroyed while at an audition. After failing to sell a guitar they falsely claim belonged to Jimi Hendrix to pawn shop owners Jackie Dee Redding and Chow for money to buy a new speaker, Stray Bullet manages to convince Mack Daddy, now a successful record producer, to pick them up. However, he drops them when Postmaster P. refuses to make his music more aggressive.

As revenge, the friends break into Mack Daddy's office to rob it. When Mack Daddy returns in the middle of the robbery, Postmaster P. panics and shoots him in the chest; thinking he's killed him, Postmaster P. steals the golden flute off of Mack Daddy's wrist. During the chaos of all this, Butch accidentally frees the Leprechaun by stealing the amulet off his stone body. The Leprechaun hunts the friends with the help of his "Zombie Fly Girls" (a trio of women enslaved by his magic) in order to recover his stolen flute, which places listeners of its tune in a euphoric trance. Mack Daddy, who survived due to the bullet being caught by his necklace, also hunts the friends to reclaim the flute, which is the key to his success.

After killing Reverend Hanson, Jackie Dee, Chow, and their transgender friend Fontaine, the Leprechaun catches up to the three friends at the hip-hop contest they entered to win a chance to go to Las Vegas and earn a shot at a record label. The Leprechaun magically forces Stray Bullet to point his gun at Butch's head, threatening to kill him if the flute isn't returned to him. Postmaster P. reluctantly complies but then foolishly charges the Leprechaun, only for the Leprechaun to force Stray Bullet to shoot himself in the head while Postmaster P. and Butch watch in horror.

Later, Butch visits Postmaster P. at his grandma's house and convinces him to use a joint laced with four-leaf clovers to strip the Leprechaun of his powers in order to steal back the flute and use it to find success in Las Vegas.

Postmaster P. and Butch, disguised in drag, visit the club in which the Leprechaun has taken up residence. Postmaster P. breaks the Leprechaun's spell on the Zombie Fly Girls by having them smoke one of the clover joints in order to find the Leprechaun. The duo then goes upstairs to find the Leprechaun, who wants the dressed-up Postmaster P. to give him a blowjob. Before proceeding any further, the Leprechaun smokes the clover joint and passes out. After avenging the death of Stray Bullet, the boys take the flute and head downstairs to escape, only to be intercepted by Mack Daddy, who shoots Butch, killing him. Postmaster P. retaliates by shooting Mack Daddy three times. No longer under the effects of the clover, the Leprechaun comes downstairs and uses magic to pin Postmaster P. against a girder. Postmaster P. then distracts the Leprechaun, allowing the bullet-ridden Mack Daddy to hit the Leprechaun with a wooden chair. Immediately, the Leprechaun uses magic to explode Mack Daddy's torso, but with the last of his strength, Mack Daddy throws the magic amulet in the air.

Some time later, Postmaster P. is now a successful rapper. However, when he removes his sunglasses, it's shown that his irises glow a neon green, which indicates that he is under the Leprechaun's spell, who is now his manager. The Leprechaun then tells the audience that he taught Postmaster P. everything he knows, before rapping about being an evil leprechaun. The Leprechaun has taken over the music world.

== Cast ==
- Warwick Davis as Lubdan The Leprechaun
- Ice-T as "Mack Daddy O'Nassas"
- Anthony Montgomery as "Postmaster P." Smith
- Rashaan Nall as "Stray Bullet"
- Red Grant as Butch
- Dan Martin as Jackie Dee Redding
- Lobo Sebastian as Fontaine Rivera
- Ivory Ocean as Reverend Hanson
- Coolio as Himself
- Barima McKnight as "Slug"
- Jack Ong as Chow Yung Pi
- Eric Mansker as Mack Daddy's bodyguard
- Steven M. Porter as Berry Grady
- Bebe Drake as Mrs. Smith
- Donna M. Perkins as Jackie Cee Redding, Jackie Dee's Wife
- Daya Vaidya as Zombie Fly Girl #1
- Chloe Hunter as Zombie Fly Girl #2
- Lori J. Jones as Zombie Fly Girl #3
- Chrystee Pharris as Girl (uncredited)
- Diana Terranova as Leprechaun's Girl (uncredited)
- William Washington as Electrocuted Man (uncredited)

== Reception ==
The film received a negative critical reception, and holds a 33% approval rating on review aggregator website Rotten Tomatoes, based on 9 reviews. Nathan Rabin of The A.V. Club wrote that a hip-hop themed sequel in the film series was "inevitable" and the result is "intermittently amusing". Mike Flaherty of Entertainment Weekly rated it B+ and called it "bloody, broad, and comically brutal, it's blaxploitation at its best". Kevin Archibald of IGN rated it 6/10 stars and called it "really dumb, but entertaining", while Scott Weinberg of eFilmCritic rated it 1/5 stars and wrote: "There's simply nothing to recommend here even a little".

E! Online ranked it eighth in their Top 10 High-Larious Stoner Movies.

== Awards and nominations ==
Warwick Davis was nominated for the Video Business Video Premiere Award for best actor in a direct-to-video release.

== Sequel ==
A direct sequel to the film, titled Leprechaun: Back 2 tha Hood, was released direct-to-video on December 30, 2003.
