= Linden Porco =

Canadian actor (born 1996)

- Born: August 29, 1996 (age 30); Winnipeg, Manitoba, Canada
- Occupation: Actor
- Years active: 2004–present
- Height: 2 ft 8 in (0.81 m) (as of 2007)

Linden Porco (born August 29, 1996) is a Canadian actor. He is 3'3" as of 2025 and is best known for his role as a body double in the 2006 American film Little Man. He was born with cartilage–hair hypoplasia, a form of dwarfism that stunts growth, but allows for proportional development.

== Filmography ==
=== Film ===
Year	Title	Role	Notes
2006	Little Man	Calvin's body double	
2006	Linden's World	Himself	Short film
2008	Bunky Blum and the Talking Train	Bunky Blum	Short film
2013	A Very Larry Christmas	Faldefeiker	
2017	Cult of Chucky	Chucky Doll Body Double	Direct-to-video
2018	Leprechaun Returns	The Leprechaun	Direct-to-video

=== Television ===
Year	Title	Role	Notes
2004	A Wonderful World of Disney	Little Boy	Episode: "Naughty or Nice"
2006	Thugaboo: A Miracle on D-roc's Street	Gavin	Television film
2015	Sunnyside	Clown Baby / Little Tim	Guest role; 2 episodes
2015	The Pinkertons	Stage Hand	Episode: "The Devil's Trade"
2018	Channel Zero: Butcher's Block	Smart Mouth	Recurring role; 6 episodes
2024–2025	Resident Alien	Dale	3 episodes
2025	The Witcher	Percival Shuttenbach	6 episodes
