= Warwick Davis =

English actor (born 1970)

Warwick Davis OBE
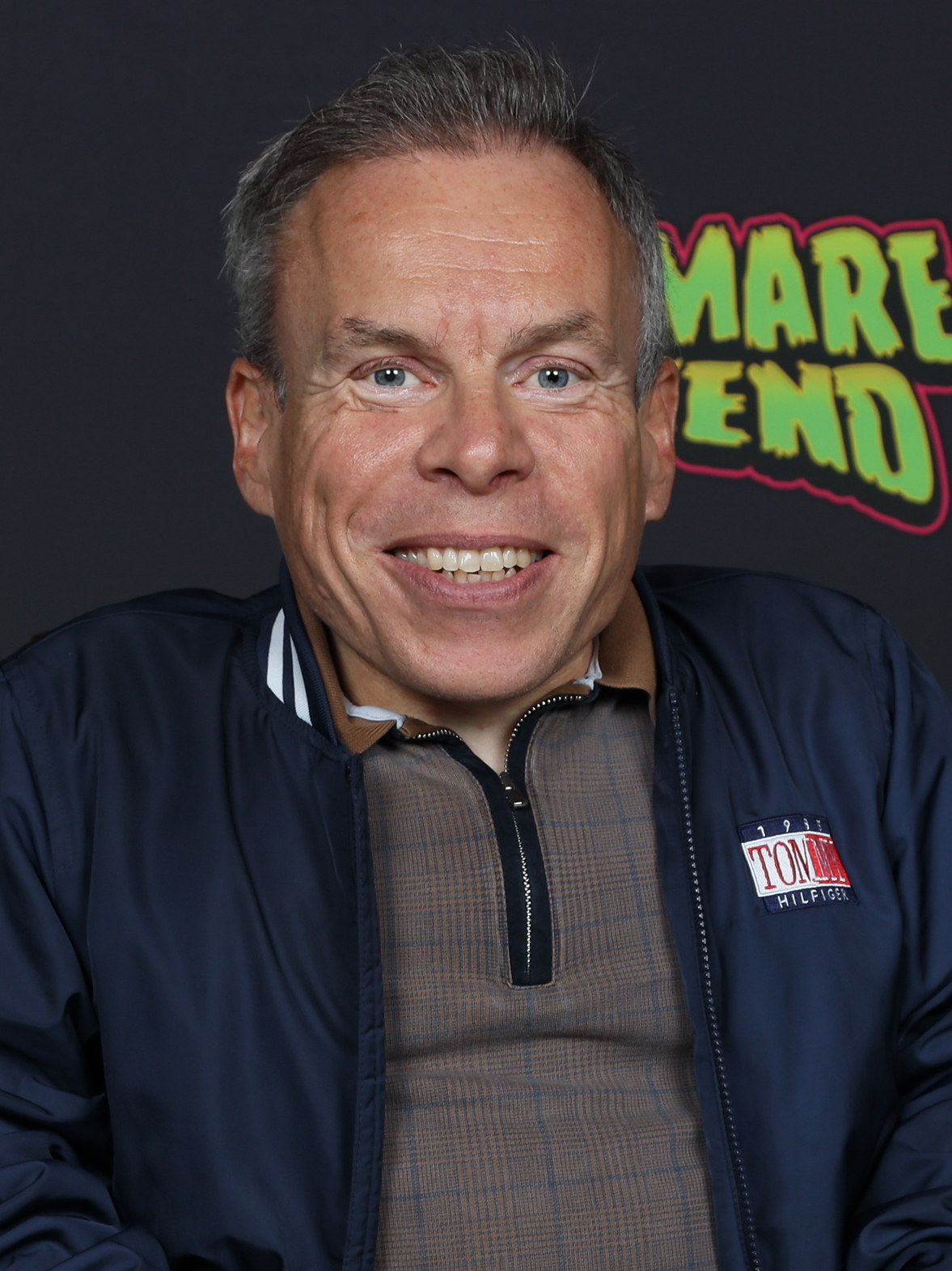
- Davis in 2023
- Born: Warwick Ashley Davis; 3 February 1970 (age 56); Epsom, Surrey, England
- Occupations: Actor; television presenter
- Years active: 1982–present
- Television: Life's Too Short; Celebrity Squares; Tenable
- Height: 3 ft 6 in (107 cm)
- Spouse: Samantha Burroughs (m. 1991; died 2024)
- Children: 3, (Note: His first child died nine days after birth.) including Annabelle
- Relatives: Peter Burroughs (father-in-law)
- Website: warwickdavis.co.uk

Warwick Ashley Davis (/ˈwɒrɪk/ WORR-ik; born 3 February 1970) is an English actor and television presenter. Active within the industry since he was eleven, Davis is among the highest-grossing supporting actors of all time and has the highest average gross revenue of all supporting actors. He played the title character in Willow (1988) and the Leprechaun film series (1993–2003); several characters in the Star Wars film series (1983–2024), most notably Wicket the Ewok; and Professor Filius Flitwick and the goblin Griphook in the Harry Potter film series (2001–2011).

Davis starred as a fictionalised version of himself in the sitcom Life's Too Short (2011–2013). He has presented the ITV game shows Celebrity Squares (2014–2015) and Tenable (2016–2024). In 2025, Davis was awarded the BAFTA Fellowship for lifetime achievement from the British Academy of Film and Television Arts. Davis was appointed Officer of the Order of the British Empire (OBE) in the 2026 New Year Honours for services to drama and charity.

== Early life ==
Davis was born on 3 February 1970 in Epsom, Surrey, the son of Susan J. (née Pain) and Ashley Davis, an insurance worker. He has a younger sister. He was educated at Chinthurst School in Tadworth, Surrey, and the City of London Freemen's School.

Davis was born with spondyloepiphyseal dysplasia congenita, a rare bone growth disorder that results in dwarfism. When Davis was 11, his grandmother heard a radio item about a vacancy at Borehamwood Job Centre for people who were 4 feet (120 cm) or shorter to be in Return of the Jedi. As he was a Star Wars fan, this was a dream come true for Davis. During the filming of Return of the Jedi, Mark Hamill bought Davis every Star Wars action figure that he did not already own.

== Career ==
=== Acting ===
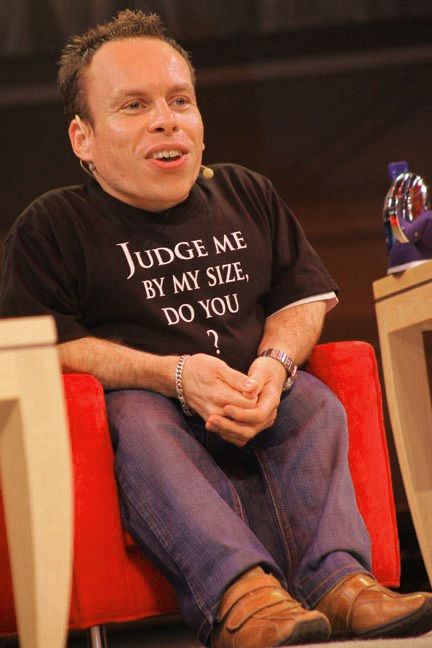
Davis in 2007

Davis was originally cast as an extra Ewok, but when Kenny Baker, who was originally going to be Wicket, fell ill, George Lucas picked Davis to be the new Wicket after seeing how he carried himself as an Ewok.

Davis based his Ewok movements on his dog, who tilted his head from side to side whenever he saw something strange. During production on the film, Davis was the subject of a short mockumentary film about his experience as Wicket, titled Return of the Ewok, made by Return of the Jedi's first assistant director, David Tomblin. The unreleased film was a fictional look at his decision to become an actor and act in the film and his transformation into Wicket the Ewok. Davis reprised his role as Wicket in the ABC made-for-TV films Caravan of Courage: An Ewok Adventure and Ewoks: The Battle for Endor.

In 1987, Davis was called to Elstree Studios near London to meet with Ron Howard and George Lucas to discuss a new film project called Willow, which was written with Davis specifically in mind. Willow was his first opportunity to act with his face visible. He co-starred with Val Kilmer in the film, which received a Royal Premiere before the Prince and Princess of Wales. He then moved to television to be in the BBC Television adaptation of the classic The Chronicles of Narnia, specifically in Prince Caspian, The Voyage of the Dawn Treader (as Reepicheep), and The Silver Chair (as Glimfeather) and an episode of Zorro filmed in Madrid. In 1993, he played the villainous Irish lead character in Leprechaun, opposite Jennifer Aniston, a role he reprised in five sequels, from 1994 to 2003. He also played a leprechaun in the 1998 family film A Very Unlucky Leprechaun. Davis returned to the Star Wars universe, playing four roles in Star Wars: Episode I – The Phantom Menace: Weazel, a gambler sitting next to Watto at the Podrace; Wald, who was Anakin's Rodian friend, Yoda in some scenes where Yoda was seen walking, and finally, a street trader seen walking around the streets of the city of Mos Espa.

Davis played the role of Professor Filius Flitwick in the Harry Potter film series. In addition to playing Flitwick, Davis played the role of the goblin Griphook in Harry Potter and the Deathly Hallows – Part 1 and Part 2, despite the role being played previously by Verne Troyer.

In 2004, Davis played the character "Plates" in the indie film Skinned Deep, directed by special effects artist Gabriel Bartalos. In 2006, Davis appeared, alongside fellow Harry Potter star Daniel Radcliffe, in an episode of BBC's comedy series Extras as a satirical version of himself. Davis starred in the film version of The Hitchhiker's Guide to the Galaxy, as the "body" of Marvin the Paranoid Android (the voice was provided by Alan Rickman). In December 2006, Davis starred in the pantomime Snow White and the Seven Dwarves at the Opera House, Manchester, and again in 2007–08 at the New Wimbledon Theatre.

Davis appeared in The Chronicles of Narnia: Prince Caspian, in which he played Nikabrik the Dwarf, adding to his previous involvement in TV adaptations of the Chronicles of Narnia series. He also appeared as a contestant on the 2007 series of Children in Need reality show Celebrity Scissorhands. Davis starred as a fictional version of himself in Life's Too Short, written by Ricky Gervais and Stephen Merchant, who also starred. In December 2012, Davis returned to New Wimbledon Theatre to reprise his role in Snow White and the Seven Dwarfs.

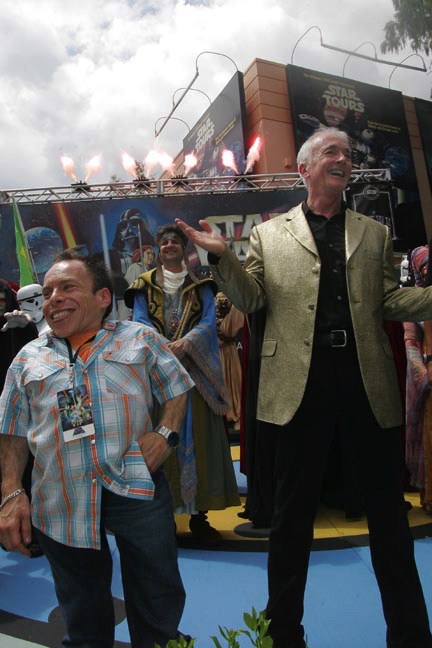
Davis with fellow Star Wars actor Anthony Daniels (C-3PO) in 2007

Davis also appeared in the 2008 TV series Merlin as the character Grettir, the gatekeeper to the "lands of Fisher King" in the episode "The Eye of the Phoenix" in Series 3.

In March 2013, Davis presented an episode of the ITV series Perspectives: "Warwick Davis – The Seven Dwarfs of Auschwitz", in which he explored the story of the Ovitz family, a touring musical troupe which included seven dwarfs who survived the Nazi Auschwitz concentration camp and the experiments of Josef Mengele.

Davis appeared as the character Porridge in the Doctor Who episode "Nightmare in Silver", first broadcast in May 2013.

In late 2013, Davis appeared for one month as Patsy in the musical comedy Spamalot, based on the film Monty Python and the Holy Grail in London. At the same time, Davis hosted a press conference to announce the Monty Python reunion.

In 2014, Davis hosted a factual series for ITV called Weekend Escapes with Warwick Davis. The show saw Davis and his family travelling around Britain, enjoying short weekend holiday breaks. The show returned for a second series in spring 2015. From 2014 to 2015, he hosted the revived version of game show Celebrity Squares on ITV. The first series was shown in 2014 and a second aired in 2015.

Davis appeared in the 2015 sequel Star Wars: The Force Awakens. In July 2015, he became the voice of Gordon the Gopher in a pilot developed for BBC Taster, and the pilot progressed well, becoming one of the highest rated on the BBC's Taster section.

In November 2016, Davis began presenting the daytime ITV game show Tenable. The show returned for further series in 2017 and 2018. Davis also appeared in Rogue One: A Star Wars Story, released December 2016, as the rebel fighter Weeteef Cyubee and that was also his first Star Wars role with a blaster. In April 2017, at Star Wars Celebration Orlando, it was announced that Davis would voice Grand Admiral Thrawn's bodyguard Rukh in the fourth season of Star Wars Rebels. In December 2017, Davis appeared as Wodibin, an alien gambler, in Star Wars: The Last Jedi. Davis appeared in the film Solo: A Star Wars Story, released in May 2018, reuniting with his Willow director Ron Howard. This was Davis' eighth appearance in a Star Wars film. In the film, Davis reprised his role of Weazel from The Phantom Menace. Davis also briefly appeared in Star Wars: The Rise of Skywalker, reprising his role of Wicket. He appeared in the role alongside his son Harrison, who also cameoed as Wicket's son Pommet.

Davis reprised his role as Willow Ufgood in the Disney+ series Willow to generally positive critic reviews.

In February 2025, Davis was awarded a BAFTA Fellowship.

In September 2025, it was announced Davis would reprise his role of Professor Flitwick in the upcoming HBO Harry Potter TV series.

==== Star Wars characters ====
Davis plays Wicket in four films and Weazel in two films; all fifteen of Warwick Davis' Star Wars characters break down as such:

Title	Year	Character
Star Wars: Episode VI – Return of the Jedi	1983	Wicket
Caravan of Courage: An Ewok Adventure	1984	Wicket
Ewoks: The Battle for Endor	1985	Wicket
Star Wars: Episode I – The Phantom Menace	1999	Wald, Weazel, Yoda (walking shots), a street trader on Tatooine
Star Wars: Episode VII - The Force Awakens	2015	Wollivan
Rogue One: A Star Wars Story	2016	Weeteef Cyu-Bee
Star Wars: Episode VIII - The Last Jedi	2017	Wodibin, Thamm (voice), Kedpin Shoklop
Star Wars Rebels	2017	Rukh (voice)
Solo: A Star Wars Story	2018	Weazel, DD-BD, W1-EG5, WG-22
Star Wars: Episode IX - The Rise of Skywalker	2019	Wicket, Wizzich Mozzer
Star Wars: Tales of the Empire	2024	Rukh (voice)

=== Other projects ===
In 1995, Davis co-founded, with fellow actor and father-in-law Peter Burroughs, the talent agency Willow Management, that specialises in representing actors under five feet (1.5 m) tall. Many of Davis's co-stars and fellow actors with dwarfism from Star Wars, Willow, Labyrinth and the Harry Potter series are represented by the agency. In 2004, the agency also began representing actors over seven feet (2.1 m) tall who had suffered from being confined to "niche" roles. Over forty members of Willow Management were cast as goblins in Harry Potter and the Deathly Hallows – Part 2.

In April 2010, Davis published his autobiography, Size Matters Not: The Extraordinary Life and Career of Warwick Davis, with a foreword by George Lucas.

In October 2012, Davis appeared in a set of videos with the popular YouTube group The Yogscast, after the hosts of the Yogscast's podcast "The YogPod" discussed him in several episodes. In January 2013, he appeared in a Comic Relief episode of The Great British Bake Off, winning that episode's title of "Comic Relief Star Baker".

Davis is a founder of the Reduced Height Theatre Company, which stages theatrical productions cast exclusively with short actors and using reduced height sets. Their first production was See How They Run, touring the UK in 2014. In February 2015, the production was the subject of the BBC's "Warwick Davis' Big Night" as part of the Modern Times documentary series.

On 15 July 2014, Davis appeared on stage with Monty Python during their live show Monty Python Live (Mostly). He was the special guest in their "Blackmail" sketch. In June 2016, he was the castaway on the BBC Radio 4 programme Desert Island Discs, choosing Jon Hopkins' Monsters theme, The Guinness Book of Records and a pen and paper as his favourite record, book, and luxury item respectively.

Davis produced a new original musical Eugenius! by Ben Adams and Chris Wilkins, which premiered as a concert performance on 29 June 2016 at the London Palladium (which Davis also starred in as Evil Lord Hector) followed by fully staged runs at The Other Palace in 2018.

In February 2017, the BBC broadcast an episode of the genealogy programme Who Do You Think You Are? about Davis. In the episode Davis learned that in his family tree he had an ancestor that had been married to two women at the same time, another who had died in an asylum from syphilis and another who performed at minstrel shows in blackface.

In 2018, Davis was appointed as an ambassador for The Scout Association.

In December 2024, Davis appeared as a guest judge on the Food Network competition show Harry Potter: Wizards of Baking.

== Personal life ==
Davis is 3 feet 6 inches (107 cm) tall.

He was married to Samantha Davis (née Burroughs), the daughter of Davis' business partner Peter Burroughs and the sister of actress Hayley Burroughs, until her death on 24 March 2024. Davis met the Burroughs family while filming Willow, where Samantha and Peter had minor roles as Nelwyn villagers. They have two surviving children; daughter, actress Annabelle Davis; and son, actor Harrison Davis. Harrison was named after actor Harrison Ford, whom Warwick met on the 1981 set of Return of the Jedi.

Unlike most people with dwarfism who have a condition called achondroplasia (70.65%), Davis' dwarfism is caused by a rare genetic condition called spondyloepiphyseal dysplasia congenita (SED). Davis' wife, Samantha, had achondroplasia, and their two children have SED. As a result of inheriting both conditions, the couple's first son died nine days after birth. Their second son was miscarried at 19 weeks.

Davis has said the only real drawback to being small was the associated health problems. Of his own dwarfism, Davis has said, "Well, as you get older, it gets worse... Your joints, for a start. My hips are dislocated, so they're sitting out here. Very painful knees. I had surgery on my feet when I was very young. There's a risk of retinal detachment, but I know the signs now."

Davis is co-founder of Little People UK, a charity that provides support to people with dwarfism and their families.

== Filmography ==
Key
†	Denotes projects that have not yet been released

=== Film ===
Year	Title	Role	Notes	Ref.
1982	Return of the Ewok	Himself / Wicket W. Warrick	Unreleased	
1983	Return of the Jedi	Wicket W. Warrick		
1984	Caravan of Courage: An Ewok Adventure	Wicket W. Warrick	Voiced by Darryl Henriques	
1985	Ewoks: The Battle for Endor	Wicket W. Warrick	Voiced by Darryl Henriques	
1986	Labyrinth	Goblin Corps member		
1986	The Princess and the Dwarf			
1988	Willow	Willow Ufgood		
1993	Leprechaun	Lubdan		
1994	Leprechaun 2	Lubdan		
1995	Leprechaun 3	Lubdan		
1996	Leprechaun 4: In Space	Lubdan		
1997	Prince Valiant	Pechet		
1998	A Very Unlucky Leprechaun	Lucky		
1999	Star Wars: Episode I – The Phantom Menace	Yoda (walk-in shots) / Weazel / Wald		
1999	The New Adventures of Pinocchio	Dwarf / Pepe the Cricket		
1999	The White Pony	Lucky		
2000	The 10th Kingdom	Acorn the Dwarf		
2000	Leprechaun in the Hood	Lubdan		
2001	Snow White: The Fairest of Them All	Saturday		
2001	Harry Potter and the Philosopher's Stone	Professor Filius Flitwick / Goblin Bank Teller / Griphook (voice)		
2002	Harry Potter and the Chamber of Secrets	Professor Filius Flitwick		
2002	Al's Lads	Leo		
2003	Leprechaun: Back 2 tha Hood	Lubdan		
2004	Ray	Oberon		
2004	Harry Potter and the Prisoner of Azkaban	Choir Master	Choir Master appearance later reused for the rest of the series as a design for Professor Filius Flitwick- A separate character to Choir Master	
2004	Skinned Deep	Plates		
2005	The Hitchhiker's Guide to the Galaxy	Marvin the Paranoid Android	Voiced by Alan Rickman	
2005	Harry Potter and the Goblet of Fire	Professor Filius Flitwick		
2005	Small Town Folk	Knackerman		
2007	Harry Potter and the Order of the Phoenix	Professor Filius Flitwick		
2008	Agent One-Half	Agent One-Half		
2008	The Chronicles of Narnia: Prince Caspian	Nikabrik		
2009	Harry Potter and the Half-Blood Prince	Professor Filius Flitwick		
2009	Tell Him Next Year	Santa's Elf	Short film	
2010	Harry Potter and the Deathly Hallows – Part 1	Griphook		
2011	Dick and Dom's Funny Business	Himself		
2011	Harry Potter and the Deathly Hallows – Part 2	Griphook / Professor Filius Flitwick		
2012	Chingari	Gangster Boss	As featured on An Idiot Abroad 3	
2012	An Idiot Abroad	Himself	Series 3	
2013	Jack the Giant Slayer	Old Hamm		
2013	Ashens and the Quest for the GameChild	Himself / The Silver Skull Unmasked	Independent film	
2013	Dwarves Assemble	Oberon the Ufgood	All episodes	
2013	The Seven Dwarfs of Auschwitz	Himself / Presenter	Documentary	
2013	Saint Bernard	Othello		
2014	Get Santa	Sally		
2014	Text Santa			
2014–2015	Weekend Escapes with Warwick Davis	Presenter	2 series	
2014–2015	Celebrity Squares	Presenter	2 series	
2015	Piers Morgan's Life Stories	Himself		
2015	Star Wars: The Force Awakens	Wollivan		
2016	Rogue One: A Star Wars Story	Weeteef Cyubee		
2017	Star Wars: The Last Jedi	Wodibin / Kedpin Shoklop (deleted scene)		
2017	British Airways Safety Video	Himself	Pre-flight safety video	
2018	Solo: A Star Wars Story	Weazel / DD-BD / W1-EG5 / WG-22		
2019	Maleficent: Mistress of Evil	Lickspittle		
2019	Horrible Histories – The Movie	Gladiator Trainer		
2019	Star Wars: The Rise of Skywalker	Wicket W. Warrick / Wizzich Mozzer		

=== Television ===
Year	Title	Role	Notes	Ref.
1989	Prince Caspian/The Voyage of the Dawn Treader	Reepicheep		
1990	The Silver Chair	Glimfeather		
1991	Zorro	Don Alf onso	Episode: "The Jewelled Sword"	
1996	Gulliver's Travels	Grildrig		
1997	The Fast Show	Dwarf	Series 3 Episode 8	
1998-2001	Jamboree	Baby Bopkin		
2005	Extras	Himself		
2009	M.I.High	Per Trollberger	Season 3 Episode 11: "The Visit"	
2010	Merlin	Grettir	Episode: "The Eye of the Phoenix"	
2011	Life's Too Short	Himself	Creator	
2011-2012	An Idiot Abroad	Himself	5 episodes	
2013	Doctor Who	Porrige/Ludens Nimrod Kendrick Cord Longstaff XLI	Episode: "Nightmare In Silver"	
2013	Bookaboo	Episode: "Dustbin Dad"		
2014	Catchphrase	Contestant	Celebrity Series 3, Episode 1	
2015	The One Show	Guest presenter	Stand-in presenter	
2015	Catherine Tate's Nan	Graham Fanee	Episode: "Nanger Management"	
2015	Realms of Fightinge	Teuthis	Web series	
2015–2016	Planet's Got Talent	Narrator	2 series	
2016	Billionaire Boy	Himself	Television film	
2016	The Dumping Ground	Lou	2 episodes	
2016	The Entire Universe	The Big Bang	Television special	
2016	Fantastic Beasts and JK Rowling's Wizarding World	Presenter	Television special	
2016	Jonathan Creek	Rev. Wendell Wilkie	Episode: "Daemons' Roost"	
2016–2024	Tenable	Presenter	ITV game show	
2017	Who Do You Think You Are?	Himself	1 episode	
2017–2018	Star Wars Rebels	Rukh (voice)	6 episodes	
2017–present	Comic Relief	Co-presenter	2017 telethon	
2019–2024	Moominvalley	Sniff (voice)	26 episodes	
2020	JJ Villard's Fairy Tales	Rumpelstiltskin (voice)	Episode: "Rumpelstiltskin"	
2021–2022	Moley	Moley (voice)	52 episodes	
2022	Willow	Willow Ufgood	Lead role	
2024	Star Wars: Tales of the Empire	Rukh (voice)	Episode: "The Path of Anger"	
2024	Harry Potter: Wizards of Baking	Guest judge	2 Episodes	
2026–present	Harry Potter †	Professor Filius Flitwick		

== Accolades ==
Davis was appointed an Officer of the Order of the British Empire (OBE) in the 2026 New Year Honours for services to drama and charity. The honour was presented to him by William, Prince of Wales on 11 March 2026.

=== Awards and nominations ===
Award Ceremony	Year	Category	Nominated work	Result	Ref.
Academy of Science Fiction, Fantasy & Horror Films, USA	1990	Best Performance by a Younger Actor	Willow	Nominated	
Young Artist Award	1989	Best Young Actor in a Motion Picture - Drama	Willow	Nominated	
DVD Exclusive Awards	2001	Best Actor	Leprechaun 5: In the Hood	Nominated	
Phoenix Film Critics Society Awards	2003	Best Acting Ensemble	Harry Potter and the Chamber of Secrets	Nominated	
The BAM Awards	2017	Best Cast	Star Wars: Episode VIII - The Last Jedi	Nominated	
Family Film Awards	2024	Best Iconic Film	Willow	Nominated	

=== Honorary Awards ===
Award Ceremony	Year	Category	Result	Ref.
British Academy of Film and Television Arts	2025	The Fellowship	Honored	
