= Mark Jones (filmmaker) =

American filmmaker (1953–2026)

- Born: Mark Robert Jones; January 17, 1953; Los Angeles, California, U.S.
- Died: January 16, 2026 (aged 72); Los Angeles, California, U.S.
- Occupation: Filmmaker
- Years active: 1976–2013
- Notable work: Leprechaun

Mark Robert Jones (January 17, 1953 – January 16, 2026) was an American screenwriter and director and producer in both film and television. He wrote and directed Leprechaun (1993), about the fairy tale character, beginning the horror franchise of the same name, which includes eight films in total. He also directed and co-wrote the horror film Rumpelstiltskin (1995), also based on a fairy tale, and wrote for numerous television series such as The A-Team and The Highwayman. Jones wrote and directed the 2008 film Triloquist and the 2013 film Scorned. Jones died at West Hills Hospital in Los Angeles on January 16, 2026, one day before his 73rd birthday.

== Filmography ==
=== Film ===
Year	Title	Director	Writer	Producer	Actor	Role
1993	Leprechaun	Yes	Yes			
1994	Leprechaun 2			Yes		
1995	Rumpelstiltskin	Yes	Yes			
2004	Quiet Kill	Yes				
2008	Triloquist	Yes	Yes	Yes	Yes	Goofy Guy
2013	Scorned	Yes	Yes		Yes	Cop Holding Bootsie

=== Television ===
Year	Title	Director	Writer	Story editor	Producer	Network	Notes
1976	Ark II		Yes			CBS	Episode: "The Tank"
1977	The Skatebirds		Stories			CBS	Unknown episodes
1977	Captain Caveman and the Teen Angels		Yes			ABC	Unknown episodes
1977	The All-New Super Friends Hour		Yes			ABC	2 episodes
1977	What's New, Mr. Magoo?		Yes			CBS	16 episodes
1978	Scooby's Laff-A Lympics		Stories			ABC	Unknown episodes
1978	Yogi's Space Race		Stories			NBC	Unknown episodes
1978	The All-New Popeye Hour		Stories			CBS	Unknown episodes
1978	Fangface		Yes			ABC	Episode: "A Heap of Trouble"
1978	Buford and the Galloping Ghost		Stories			NBC	Unknown episodes
1978	Dinky Dog		Stories			CBS	16 episodes
1979–1980	The Plastic Man Comedy/Adventure Show		Stories	Yes		ABC	Unknown episodes
1980–1981	The Misadventures of Sheriff Lobo		Yes	Yes		ABC	story editor (10 episodes) writer (9 episodes)
1981	Scooby-Doo and Scrappy-Doo		Stories			ABC	Unknown episodes
1981	Heathcliff		Stories			ABC	Unknown episodes
1981–1982	The Fall Guy		Yes			ABC	3 episodes
1982	The Scooby and Scrappy-Doo Puppy Hour		Stories	Executive		ABC	Unknown episodes
1983	The Powers of Matthew Star		Yes			NBC	Episode: "The Road Rebels"
1983	The Puppy's Further Adventures		Yes	Executive	Yes	ABC	Unknown episodes
1983	Mister T		Yes			NBC	Episode: "Mystery of the Golden Medallion"
1983	Saturday Supercade		Story			CBS	Episode: "The Incredible Shrinking Ape"
1983	Rubik, the Amazing Cube		Story	Executive	Yes	ABC	Story editor and producer (episode: "Super Power Lisa") Story (episode: "Honolulu Rubik")
1983–1984	The Rousters		Yes			NBC	4 episodes
1984	Riptide		Yes	Yes		NBC	9 episodes (story editor); 3 episodes (written by)
1984	Turbo Teen		Yes			ABC	Episode: "Turbo Thieves"
1984–1985	The A-Team		Yes	Yes		NBC	24 episodes (story editor); 8 episodes (written by)
1985	Hunter		Yes			NBC	2 episodes
1985	Misfits of Science		Yes			NBC	Episode: "Lost Link"
1985–1986	Knight Rider				Yes	NBC	3 episodes
1987	A.L.F.		Yes			NBC	Episode: "Two for the Brig"
1987	Werewolf		Yes			FOX	2 episodes
1988	The Highwayman		Yes		Yes	NBC	writer (episode: "Summer of '45") producer (Unknown episodes)
1988	Police Academy		Yes			Syndicated	Episode: "Cops and Robots"
1988	The Road Raiders		Yes			unknown	Television film
1989–1990	Superboy		Yes	Executive		Syndicated	4 episodes
1991	James Bond Jr.		Yes	Yes		Syndicated	2 episodes
1993	Wild West C.O.W.-Boys of Moo Mesa		Yes			ABC	3 episodes
1994	High Tide				Yes	Syndicated	Unknown episodes
1994–1995	Mega Man		Yes			Syndicated	2 episodes
1995	Skysurfer Strike Force		Yes	Yes		Syndicated	3 episodes
1997–1998	NightMan	Yes	Yes			Syndicated	director (3 episodes) writer (episode: "Nightwoman")
2016	Nature	Yes			Yes	Discovery Channel	Episode: "Natural Born Hustlers: The Hunger Hustlers"
