= Lists of television specials =

These are lists of television specials.

== By holiday ==
- List of Halloween television specials
- List of Christmas television specials
- List of United States Christmas television specials
- List of Thanksgiving television specials
- List of Easter television specials
- List of St. Patrick's Day television specials
- List of Valentine's Day television specials

== By franchise ==
- List of One Piece television specials
- List of Lupin III television specials
- List of Extreme Makeover: Home Edition specials

== Other ==
- List of television specials on Australian television in 2008
- List of war films and TV specials

== See also ==
- Lists of television programs
