= List of Christmas television specials =

The following is a list of Christmas television specials and miniseries, as well as Christmas-themed episodes of regular television series.

== Australia ==
Series	Episode	Year	Channel	Description
The Adventures of Blinky Bill	Blinky Bill's White Christmas	2005	Seven Network	
Bananas in Pyjamas	The Snowman	2012	ABC Kids	
Bananas in Pyjamas	The Christmas Tree	2013	ABC Kids	
Johnson and Friends	The Christmas Tree	1997	ABC Television	
Johnson and Friends	Christmas Presents	1997	ABC Television	
Kath & Kim	Da Kath and Kim Code	2005	ABC Television	
The Koala Brothers	Outback Christmas	2005	ABC Television	
McLeod's Daughters	Silent Night	2007	Nine Network	
Miss Fisher's Murder Mysteries	Murder Under the Mistletoe	2013	ABC Television	
Mother and Son	Christmas Drinks	1985	ABC Television	
Play School	A Very Play School Christmas	2019	ABC Kids	
Round the Twist	Santa Claws	1989	Seven Network	
SheZow	SheZon's Greetings	2013	Network Ten	
Swift and Shift Couriers	A Swifty Shifty Christmas	2008	SBS Television	

== Brazil ==
Series	Episode	Year	Channel	Description
Sai de Baixo	Where's the Turkey?	1996	Rede Globo	
Toma Lá Dá Cá	Pilot	2005	Rede Globo	
A Grande Família	Today the Party is Yours	2008	Rede Globo	
Porta dos Fundos	The Last Hangover	2018	Netflix	

== Canada ==
=== Episodes ===
==== 6teen ====
Episode	Year	Channel	Description
Deck the Mall	2004	Teletoon	
In a Retail Wonderland	2005	Teletoon	
Snow Job	2006	Teletoon	
How the Rent-a-Cop Stole Christmas	2007	Teletoon	

==== The Beachcombers ====
Episode	Year	Channel	Description
Here Comes Santa Claus	1974	CBC	
In the Still of the Night	1975	CBC	
The Great Shaman of the North	1976	CBC	
A Christmas Story	1980	CBC	
A Family Christmas	1982	CBC	
Without Words	1983	CBC	
Stars of Wonder	1987	CBC	
A Beachcombers Christmas - reunion movie	2004	CBC	

==== Corner Gas ====
Series	Episode	Year	Channel	Description
Corner Gas	Merry Gasmas	2005	CTV	
Corner Gas Animated	Tinsel-itis	2020	CTV Comedy Channel	

==== Degrassi ====
Series	Episode	Year	Channel	Description
Degrassi Junior High	Season's Greetings	1988	CBC	
Degrassi: The Next Generation	Holiday	2003	CTV	

==== The Forest Rangers ====
Episode	Year	Channel	Description
A Christmas Story	1963	CBC	
Santa McLeod	1965	CBC	

==== Hangin' In ====
Episode	Year	Channel	Description
Christmas Wrapping	1982	CBC	
Christmas Hotline	1984	CBC	

==== Life with Boys ====
Episode	Year	Channel	Description
Chrisbus with Boys	2011	YTV	
Naughty and Nice with Boys	2012	YTV	

==== The Little Lulu Show ====
Episode	Year	Channel	Description
The Night Before Christmas	1996	CTV	Description
Oh Christmas Tree/Santa's Snowman/The Snoopers	1996	CTV	Description

==== Little Mosque on the Prairie ====
Episode	Year	Channel	Description
Eid's a Wonderful Life	2007	CBC	
A Holiday Story	2010	CBC	

==== My Little Pony: Friendship Is Magic ====
Episode	Year	Channel	Description
Hearth's Warming Eve	2011	Hub Network	
Hearthbreakers	2015	Discovery Family	
A Hearth's Warming Tail	2016	Discovery Family	
The Hearth's Warming Club	2018	Discovery Family	

==== The Red Green Show ====
Episode	Year	Channel	Description
It's a Wonderful Red Green Christmas	1998	CBC	
A Very Merry Red Green Christmas	2000	CBC	
Xmas In July	2002	CBC	
A Lot Like Christmas	2002	CBC	
The Butter Man	2004	CBC	

==== Second City Television ====
Episode	Year	Channel	Description
SCTV Staff Christmas Party	1981	NBC	
Christmas	1982	NBC	
It's a Wonderful Film	1983	NBC	

==== Son of a Critch ====
Episode	Year	Channel	Description
Merry Critch-mas	2022	CBC	
The Ghosts of Christmas Presents	2024	CBC	

==== Total Drama ====
Series	Episode	Year	Channel	Description
Total Drama World Tour	Anything Yukon Do, I Can Do Better	2010	Teletoon	
Total Drama World Tour	Slap Slap Revolution	2010	Teletoon	
Total Drama World Tour	Sweden Sour	2010	Teletoon	
Total Drama: Revenge of the Island	Ice Ice Baby	2012	Teletoon	

==== Other Canadian shows ====
Series	Episode	Year	Channel	Description
The Adventures of Chuck and Friends	Boomer the Snowplow	2010	Treehouse TV	
Angela Anaconda	Secret Santa / Hooray for Chanukah	2000	YTV Teletoon	
Baroness von Sketch Show	Women Love Breadcrumbs	2021	CBC	
Being Erica	Fa La Erica	2010	CBC	
The Big Comfy Couch	Comfy and Joy	1995	YTV	This also aired in the U.S. on PBS.
Big Wolf on Campus	Anti-Claus Is Coming To Town	2001	YTV	
Call Me Fitz	A Very Special Fitzmas	2013	The Movie Network Movie Central	
Chilly Beach	Secret Santa	2003	CBC	
Donkey Kong Country	The Kongo Bongo Festival of Lights	1999	Teletoon	Donkey Kong and friends spend the holidays with their families.
Due South	Gift of the Wheelman	1994	CTV	
Kevin Spencer	Merry Christmas, A--hole!	2003	CTV	
King of Kensington	The Christmas Show	1975	CBC	
The Latest Buzz	The Happy Holidays Issue	2008	Family Channel	
League of Super Evil	The Night Before Chaos-mas	2009	YTV	
Letterkenny (TV series)	The Three Wise Men	2018	Hulu	
Life with Derek	A Very Derekus Christmas	2007	Family Channel	
Little Charmers	Santa Sparkle	2015	Treehouse TV	Santa visits CharmVille
Made in Canada	The Christmas Show	1999	CBC	
Mr. Young	Mr. Claus	2012	YTV	
Murdoch Mysteries	A Merry Murdoch Christmas	2015	CBC	
Naturally, Sadie	A Very Sadie Christmas	2006	Family Channel	
Noddy	Anything Can Happen at Christmas	1998	TVOKids CBC	
Pearlie	Jingle Bell Park	2011	YTV	
Pippi Longstocking	Pippi's Christmas	1997	YTV Teletoon	
Pound Puppies	I Heard the Barks on Christmas Eve	2012	YTV	
Radio Active	A Christmas Atoll	2000	YTV	
Really Me	A Very Maddy Christmas	2011	Family Channel	
Road to Avonlea	Happy Christmas, Miss King	1998	CBC	
Ruby Gloom	Happy Yam Ween	2006	YTV	
Schitt's Creek	Merry Christmas, Johnny Rose	2018	CBC	
Slings & Arrows	Fallow Time	2005	The Movie Network & Movie Central	
The Smart Woman Survival Guide	Santa's Last Stand	2007	Cosmopolitan TV (Canadian TV channel)	
Street Legal	I'll Be Home for Christmas	1987	CBC	
Student Bodies	The Christmas Concert	1997	Global & YTV	
Today's Special	Christmas	1983	TVOntario	
Trailer Park Boys	Dear Santa Claus Go F*ck Yourself	2004	Showcase	
Wind at My Back	A Wind at My Back Christmas	2001	CBC	
You Can't Do That on Television	Christmas	1984	CTV	

=== Specials ===
Special	Year	Channel	Description
Bluetoes the Christmas Elf	1988	CBC	Based on the book Bluetoes: Santa's Special Helper by George Polkosnik
Bob's Broken Sleigh	2015	Family Channel	
Care Bears Nutcracker Suite	1988	Global	
The Christmas Orange	2002	Teletoon	Based on the 1998 children's book of the same by Don Gillmor and Marie-Louise Gay
The Christmas Raccoons	1980	CBC	A precursor TV special to the later series The Raccoons (1985–1991)
A Cosmic Christmas	1977	CBC	A television special that was the first fully-animated production from Toronto's Nelvana.
The Curse of Clara: A Holiday Tale	2015	CBC	
George and the Christmas Star	1985	CTV	
A Gift of Munsch	1994	CTV	
The Gift of Winter	1974	CBC	
A Gift to Last	1976	CBC	
The Great Northern Candy Drop	2017	CBC	
The Little Brown Burro	1978		
The Little Crooked Christmas Tree	1990		Based on the 1989 book of the same name by Michael Cutting
The Magic Hockey Skates	2012	CBC	
Must Be Santa	1999	CBC	
Nilus the Sandman: The Boy Who Dreamed Christmas	1991	CTV	A precursor TV special to the later series Nilus the Sandman (1996–1998)
A Russell Peters Christmas	2011	CTV	
The Santa Claus Brothers	2001	YTV	
The Teddy Bears' Christmas	1992	CTV	Sequel to the 1989 special The Teddy Bears' Picnic (1989), followed by a further follow-up The Teddy Bears' Scare (1998) and a series The Secret World of Benjamin Bear (2003–2009)
The Tin Soldier	2011	Treehouse TV	TV pilot for The Toy Castle (2000–2008)
The Trolls and the Christmas Express	1981		
Tukiki and His Search for a Merry Christmas	1979		

== France ==
Series	Episode	Year	Channel	Description
Grizzy & the Lemmings	Well Deserved	2024	France Télévisions, Cartoon Network, and Boomerang	

== Germany ==
=== Episodes ===
==== Meister Eder und sein Pumuckl ====
Episode	Year	Channel	Description
Pumuckl und der Nikolaus	1982	Bayerisches Fernsehen	
Das Weihnachtsgeschenk	1982	Bayerisches Fernsehen	
Eders Weihnachtsgeschenk	1988	Bayerisches Fernsehen	

==== Other German shows ====
Series	Episode	Year	Channel	Description
Der Bergdoktor	2x09 Eine Weihnachtsgeschichte aus Tirol	1992	Sat.1	
Der Bulle von Tölz	12x5 Der Weihnachtsmann ist tot	2005	Sat.1	
Meine Freundin Conni	Conni feiert Weihnachten	2012	KiKa	

== Hungary ==
=== Cartoon ===
Series	Episode	Year	Channel	Description
A nagy ho-ho-ho-horgász	What Gift Did Santa Claus Brought To Us?	1984	M1	
A nagy ho-ho-ho-horgász	The Christmas Fish	1984	M1	
Frakk, a macskák réme	What Gift Will Santa Claus Bring to Us?	1972	M1	
Pom Pom meséi	Gombóc Arthur, the Santa Claus	1980	M1	

=== Sitcom ===
Series	Episode	Year	Channel	Description
Mindenből egy van	Merry Christmas!	2011	M1	
Munkaügyek	Christmas Partner Conference	2012	M1	

=== Soap opera ===
Series	Episode	Year	Channel	Description
Barátok közt	Christmas Special	2005	RTL Klub	

=== Comedy ===
Series	Episode	Year	Channel	Description
A mi kis falunk	Christmas	2022	RTL	

== Iceland ==
=== Christmas calendar series (Jóladagatal Sjónvarpsins) ===
Series	Year	Channel	Notes
Á baðkari til Betlehem	1990	RÚV	Rerun in 1995, 2004
Stjörnustrákur	1991	RÚV	Rerun in 1998, 2006
Tveir á báti	1992	RÚV	Rerun in 2000,
Jól á leið til jarðar	1994	RÚV	Rerun in 1999, 2007
Hvar er Völundur?	1996	RÚV	Rerun in 2002, 2012
Klængur sniðugi	1997	RÚV	Rerun in 2003, 2009,
Töfrakúlan	2005	RÚV	Never rerun
Jólaævintýri Dýrmundar	2008	RÚV	Never rerun

Notes: Prior to 1990, RÚV did not produce and air any Christmas calendar series. In 1994, 2010–2011, 2013–present RÚV only aired Scandinavian produced Christmas calendar series.

=== LazyTown ===
Episode	Year	Channel	Description
LazyTown's Surprise Santa	2004		
The Holiday Spirit	2013		

== Ireland ==
=== The Podge and Rodge Show ===
Episode	Year	Channel	Description
A Frightmare before Christmas	2006	RTÉ Two	
Podge and Rodge's Christmas Craic	2008	RTÉ Two	
Late Night Lock Inn	2009	RTÉ Two	

=== Other Irish series ===
Series	Episode	Year	Channel	Description
Deal or No Deal	Deal or No Deal Christmas special	2009	TV3	
Father Ted	A Christmassy Ted	1996	Channel 4	
Hardy Bucks	Hardy Bucks Christmas special	2010	RTÉ	
Republic of Telly	Republic of Telly Christmas special	2010	RTÉ Two	

== Japan ==
=== Anime ===
Series	Episode	Year	Channel	Description
Age 12	Christmas			
Aggretsuko	We Wish You a Metal Christmas	2017	Netflix	
Ah My Buddha	Don't Irritate Me!!	2005		
Ai Yori Aoshi	Beautiful Snow	2003		
Asteroid in Love	Winter Diamond	2020	AT-X	
Astro Boy	The Light Ray Robot	1980	NTV	
Azumanga Daioh	Osaka's Scary Story / Feeling Different / December / Incredible Santa / Christmas Meeting	2002		
Bartender	Christmas Miracle	2006		
Bobobo-bo Bo-bobo	Let's Get Wiggy With It	2003	TV Asahi	
Chocotto Sister	Happy Christmas	2006	Chiba TV	
Cyborg 009	Christmas Eve Mirage	2001	TV Tokyo	
Cyborg Kuro-chan	Kotaro's Christmas	2000		
Dinosaur King	Santa Saurus	2007		
Dr. Stone	Spartan Crafts Club	2019		
The Duke of Death and His Maid	The Duke, Alice, and the Christmas Eve Vow	2021	Tokyo MX	
Fairy Tail	Fairies's Christmas	2016		
Flint the Time Detective	Cavemen's Christmas	1998		
Golgo 13	Christmas 24 Hours	2008		
Hayate no Gotoku	In English, Unmei Means Destiny	2007		
Jeanie with Light Brown Hair	Alone on Christmas Eve	1992		
K-On!	Christmas!	2010		
Kimi ni Todoke	Christmas	2010		
Kobato	…White Christmas.	2010		
Komi Can't Communicate	It's just a merry Christmas	2022		
Kyouran Kazoku Nikki	Black Santa is Sleepless in the Night	2008		
Love, Chunibyo & Other Delusions	Glimmering... Explosive Festival (Slapstick Noel)	2013		
Love Hina	Love Hina Christmas Special - Silent Eve	2000		
Lucky Star	The Various Ways for Spending the Holy Night	2007		
Magical Princess Minky Momo	Please, Santa Claus	1982		
Martian Successor Nadesico	There is No Single Truth	1996		
Minami-ke	Christmas Along with Eve	2007		
Miss Kobayashi's Dragon Maid	Troupe Dragon, On Stage! (They Had A Troupe Name, Huh)	2017		
Mother of the Goddess' Dormitory	Kiriya Wishes Upon a Christmas	2021		
My Hero Academia	Have a Merry Christmas!	2021		
My Little Monster	Christmas	2012		
My Love Story!!	My Christmas	2015		
My Senpai Is Annoying	And Then, It's Christmas	2021		
Ninja Nonsense	Ninjas Christmas	2004		
Persona 4: The Golden Animation	Not So Holy Christmas Eve	2014		
Popotan	Christmas	2003		
ReLIFE	Date	2018		
Rent-A-Girlfriend	Christmas and Girlfriend	2020	MBS	
Rental Magica	A Requiem Offered on Christmas Eve	2007	Chiba TV	
Sakura Quest	The Phoenix in the Holy Night	2017		
Sakura Trick	A Cherry Blossom-colored Wedding	2014	TBS	
Science Ninja Team Gatchaman	A Christmas Present of Death	1973	Fuji TV	
Shaman King	Chocolove's Christmas	2021		
Shirobako	Exodus Christmas	2014		
Sleepy Princess in the Demon Castle	Sleeping Princess of the Demon Castle	2020	TV Tokyo	
Steins;Gate 0	Protocol of the Two-sided Gospel: X-Day Protocol	2018		
Strawberry Marshmallow	Present	2005	TBS	
Super Dimension Fortress Macross	Romanesque	1983	MBS	
Sword Art Online	The Red-Nosed Reindeer	2012		
Tokyo Mew Mew	The Shining Tear: Celebrating Christmas with just the Two of Us	2002		
Toriko	Merry Feasttmas! Gourmet Santa's Present!	2012	Fuji TV	
Vandread	White Love	2000		
The Wallflower	Oh, My Sweet Home!	2006		
Wotakoi: Love Is Hard for Otaku	Bleak Christmas	2018		
You're Under Arrest	Santa Claus Panic!	1996		
YuruYuri	Christmasery	2011		

To Be Added More

==== B Gata H Kei ====
Episode	Year	Channel	Description
Throbbing Christmas Eve. What Does a First Kiss Taste Like?	2010		
Year 2 Class H's Christmas Party. Take Me to the Bed	2010		

==== Cardcaptor Sakura ====
Episode	Year	Channel	Description
Sakura's Wonderful Christmas	1998		
Sakura, the Cards, and a Present	1999		

==== Mermaid Melody Pichi Pichi Pitch ====
Episode	Year	Channel	Description
A Christmas Present	2003		
Battle on Christmas Eve	2004		

==== Hamtaro ====
Episode	Year	Channel	Description
Merry Christmas!	2000		
A Wonderful Santa Claus	2001		
Mimi's Christmas	2002		
The Mysterious Gift	2003		
It's Santa, Merry Christmas!	2004		
A Christmas Ride!	2005		

==== Hetalia ====
Episode	Year	Channel	Description
In The World	2009		
Academy Hetalia Christmas	2009		
Finding Santa	2013		

==== Pokémon ====
Episode	Year	Channel	Description
Holiday Hi-Jynx	1998		
Pikachu's Winter Vacations: Christmas Night	1999		
Pikachu's Winter Vacations: Stantler's Little Helpers	2000		
Pikachu's Winter Vacations: Delibird's Dilemma	2001		
Pikachu's Winter Vacations: Snorlax Snowman	2001		

==== Powerpuff Girls Z ====
Episode	Year	Channel	Description
Flower Power	2006		
All Ken Wants for Christmas	2006		

==== Pretty Cure ====
Series	Episode	Year	Channel	Description
Futari wa Pretty Cure	I Couldn't Be Happier!? Nagisa's White Christmas	2004		
Futari wa Pretty Cure Max Heart	A Skating Rink of Sweethearts? Slipping and Falling into Great Crisis	2005		
Futari wa Pretty Cure Splash Star	Cake, Kazuya and Christmas	2006		
Yes! PreCure 5	Nozomi and Coco's Christmas Vow	2007		
Yes! PreCure 5 GoGo!	Deliver Them! Everyone's Presents!	2008		
Fresh Pretty Cure!	We are Four Pretty Cure! Separation in Christmas!!	2009		
HeartCatch PreCure!	A Christmas Miracle! We Met Cure Flower!	2010		
Suite PreCure	DoReLaDo ~ ♪ The Miracle Born in the Holy Night-nya!	2011		
Smile PreCure!	A smile secret! Miyuki and the real Ultra Happy!!	2012		
DokiDoki! PreCure	Jikochu's Trap! A Christmas Without Mana	2013		
HappinessCharge PreCure!	The Enemy is God!? A Shocking Christmas!	2014		
Go! Princess PreCure	Feeling I Want to See! To the Ocean of Minami's Dream!	2015		
Witchy PreCure!	A Magical Christmas! Miral Becomes Santa!?	2016		
Kirakira Pretty Cure a la Mode	Farewell, Yukari! The Thrilling Sweets Christmas!	2017		
Hug! Pretty Cure	A Hug with Everyone! Merry Christmas☆	2018		
Star Twinkle PreCure	Surpr～ise: Santa Claus is an Alien!?	2019		
Delicious Party Pretty Cure	Merry Christmas! Something Fennel Holds Dear	2022		
Soaring Sky! Pretty Cure	The Heroes Christmas	2023		
Wonderful Pretty Cure!	Me~e~e~rry Christmas!	2024		
You and Idol Pretty Cure		2025		

==== Digimon ====
Series	Episode	Year	Channel	Description
Digimon Adventure 02	A Very Digi Christmas	2000		
Digimon Adventure 02	Dramon Power	2001		
Digimon Adventure 02	Digimon World Tour (three-part episode)	2001		
Digimon Universe: Appli Monsters	Christmas Has Vanished!? Calendamon the Calendar Thief!	2016		
Digimon Ghost Game	Ghost Taxi	2022		

==== Doraemon ====
Series	Episode	Year	Channel	Description
Doraemon (1979 TV series)	Nobita and Doraemon's Christmas (two-part episode)	1980		
Doraemon (1979 TV series)	Mini Santa	1980		
Doraemon (1979 TV series)	Flying Christmas	1982		
Doraemon (1979 TV series)	The Christmas Present	1985		
Doraemon (1979 TV series)	Time Skipping Pulley	1987		
Doraemon (1979 TV series)	Santa Mail	1996		
Doraemon (1979 TV series)	Santa Bag and Christmas	1998		
Doraemon (2005 TV series)	Nobita Claus on Christmas Eve	2009		
Doraemon (2005 TV series)	Santa Claus, the Thief Who Came on Christmas Eve	2010		
Doraemon (2005 TV series)	Escape the Giant Christmas Cake!!	2015		
Doraemon (2005 TV series)	Day Changing Calendar	2016		
Doraemon (2005 TV series)	Christmas in the House of Candies	2017		
Doraemon (2005 TV series)	Christmas Cards from the Future	2018		
Doraemon (2005 TV series)	The Presents From Time Skipping Pulley	2019		

==== Log Horizon ====
To Be Added

==== Urusei Yatsura ====
Episode	Year	Channel	Description
Pitter Patter Christmas Eve	1981	Fuji TV	
Mendo Family - Summer Christmas	1983	Fuji TV	

==== Ranma ½ ====
Episode	Year	Channel	Description
Step Outside!	1990	Fuji TV	Outta Control
A Xmas Without Ranma	1991	Fuji TV	Random Rhapsody
Tendo Family Christmas Scramble	1993	N/A	OAV

==== Ojamajo Doremi ====
Series	Episode	Year	Channel	Description
Ojamajo Doremi	Help Santa!	1999		
Ojamajo Doremi Sharp	A Happy White Christmas	2000		
Mōtto! Ojamajo Doremi	Merry Christmas with Everyone!	2001		

==== Toradora ====
Episode	Year	Channel	Description
Mercury Retrogrades at Christmas	2009		
Under the Fir Tree	2009		
Christmas Eve Festival	2009		

==== The Disastrous Life of Saiki K. ====
Episode	Year	Channel	Description
Frolic! Silent Night	2016		
Another Christmas Challenge!	2018		

==== Gintama ====
Episode	Year	Channel	Description
People Who Say That Santa Doesn't Really Exist Actually Want to Believe in Him	2006		
Santa Claus Red Is Blood Red	2010		

==== Ghost Sweeper Mikami ====
To Be Added

==== Jewelpet ====
Series	Episode	Year	Channel	Description
Jewelpet	Merry Merry Santa Comes to Town	2009		

To Be Added More

==== Sgt. Frog ====
Episode	Year	Channel	Description
The Space Frog Who Stole Christmas!	2004		
Keroro, I Cannot Say Merry Christmas	2005		
Keroro Central Tokyo's Ice Age Alisa Has Come	2006		
Keroro, Prevent Christmas!	2007		
Keroro, Merry Christmas on the Battlefield	2008		
Natsumi, Christmas Party Operation	2009		

==== Tamagotchi ====
To Be Added

==== Time Bokan ====
To Be Added

==== Yo-Kai Watch ====
To Be Added

=== Tokusatsu ===
Series	Episode	Year	Channel	Description
Ambassador Magma	A Christmas Present from the Devil	1966	Fuji TV	
Jumborg Ace	Haunted Robot, Hell's Mirror	1973	Mainichi Broadcasting System	
Enban Sensō Bankid	Aliens Aiming for HESO	1976	Nippon TV	
Hell Girl	Miracle of Christmas Eve	2006	Nippon TV	

==== Ultra Series ====
Series	Episode	Year	Channel	Description
The Return of Ultraman	Ultraman Dies at Sunset	1971	Tokyo Broadcasting System Television	
The Return of Ultraman	When the Ultra Star Shines	1971	Tokyo Broadcasting System Television	
Ultraman Ace	Resurrection! The Father of Ultra	1972	Tokyo Broadcasting System Television	
Ultraman Taro	The Ultra Christmas Tree	1973	Tokyo Broadcasting System Television	
Ultraman Max	Elly of Christmas	2005	Chubu-Nippon Broadcasting	

==== Kamen Rider ====
Series	Episode	Year	Channel	Description
Kamen Rider	Monster Wolf Man's Huge Murder Party	1971	TV Asahi	
Kamen Rider V3	Destron's Christmas Present	1973	TV Asahi	
Kamen Rider (Skyrider)	Dark Santa Claus; Ah, Transformation Impossible	1979	MBS	
Kamen Rider Super-1	Danger!! The Demonic Christmas Present	1980	MBS	
Kamen Rider Ryuki	The Twentieth Birthday & Tiger's a Hero	2002	TV Asahi	
Kamen Rider Kabuto	Christmas Earthquake & Farewell, Tsurugi!!	2006	TV Asahi	
Kamen Rider Den-O	Reliving a Blank Day & Now to Reveal Love and Truth	2007	TV Asahi	
Kamen Rider W	Begins Night & Movie War 2010	2009	TV Asahi	
Kamen Rider OOO	The Medal Struggle, the Transport Truck, and the Container & An End, the Greeed, and a New Rider	2010	TV Asahi	
Kamen Rider Fourze	Christmas Eve Choir & Right and Wrong Conflict	2011	TV Asahi	
Kamen Rider Wizard	The Miracle of Christmas	2012	TV Asahi	
Kamen Rider Gaim	Rider Great Assembly! Revealing the Mystery of the Forest! & The Truth Behind the Christmas Game	2013	TV Asahi	
Kamen Rider Drive	Who Can Prevent the Dark Christmas Eve?	2014	TV Asahi	
Kamen Rider Ghost	Imposing! A Man of Loyalty	2015	TV Asahi	
Kamen Rider Ex-Aid	Christmas Special: Targeting the Silver X mas!	2016	TV Asahi	
Kamen Rider Build	The Weaponry Hero	2017	TV Asahi	
Kamen Rider Zi-O	Forever King 2018	2018	TV Asahi	
Kamen Rider Zero-One	This is the Dawn of ZAIA	2019	TV Asahi	
Kamen Rider Revice	Eradicate Showdown! Deadmans!	2021	TV Asahi	
Kamen Rider Gotchard	Crisis Xmas! Orochi Incident	2023	TV Asahi	
Kamen Rider Gavv	The Gift of Noël	2024	TV Asahi	

==== Super Sentai ====
Series	Episode	Year	Channel	Description
Gosei Sentai Dairanger	A Straight Line To Mommy, The Ultra-White Prohibited Past, & Impression!! You Cry Too	1993	TV Asahi	
Ninja Sentai Kakuranger	The Hasty Santa	1994	TV Asahi	
Gekisou Sentai Carranger	The Reckless Driving Emperor's Frightful Fuel Check, Engine Stall On All Cars! Desperate Situation for the Giant Robo!!, & Merry Carmagic Christmas!!	1996	TV Asahi	
Denji Sentai Megaranger	Lost Them! The Evil Stalkers & We Won't Lose! The Decisive Battle is on Christmas Eve	1997	TV Asahi	
Kyukyu Sentai GoGoFive	The Hellish Psyma Beast Army & The Terrible Psyma Tree	1999	TV Asahi	
Mirai Sentai Timeranger	The Fallen Angel of Destruction, The History Correction Order, & The Revolt Against Time	2000	TV Asahi	
Hyakujuu Sentai Gaoranger	Santa Came	2001	TV Asahi	
Ninpu Sentai Hurricaneger	Gozen and The Misfortune Fan Beast	2002	TV Asahi & NT21	
Bakuryuu Sentai Abaranger	Merry Abaremas! Jamejame	2003	TV Asahi	
Tokusou Sentai Dekaranger	Mortal Campaign	2004	TV Asahi & NT21	
Mahō Sentai Magiranger	The Teacher's Teacher & Confrontation! Two Ultimate Gods	2005	TV Asahi & NT21	
GoGo Sentai Boukenger	The Dangerous Christmas Present	2006	TV Asahi & NT21/UX	
Juken Sentai Gekiranger	Hapi-Hapi Merry Christmas, Osu	2007	TV Asahi & UX	
Engine Sentai Go-onger	End-of-Year Big Cleanup & Protect Christmas Eve	2008	TV Asahi & UX	
Samurai Sentai Shinkenger	Two Centuries' Ambition & One Last Sword	2009	TV Asahi	
Kaizoku Sentai Gokaiger	A Lovely Christmas Eve	2011	TV Asahi	
Tokumei Sentai Go-Busters	Christmas Determination & Christmas Eve - Time to Finish Our Mission	2012	TV Asahi	
Zyuden Sentai Kyoryuger	Yanasanta! Deboth's World War & Wonderful! Christmas of Justice	2013	TV Asahi	
Ressha Sentai ToQger	The Beginning of the End, Who Is He? He Is Whom? & The Christmas Battle	2014	TV Asahi	
Shuriken Sentai Ninninger	Look Out For Santa Claus! & OtomoNin Wars! Nekomata Strikes Back	2015	TV Asahi	
Doubutsu Sentai Zyuohger	The Witnesses of Christmas	2016	TV Asahi	
Uchu Sentai Kyuranger	The Vow on the Holy Night, 'Alright, Lucky!'	2017	TV Asahi	
Kaitou Sentai Lupinranger VS Keisatsu Sentai Patranger	Looking Forward to Christmas	2018	TV Asahi	
Kishiryu Sentai Ryusoulger	The Stolen Holy Night	2019	TV Asahi	
Mashin Sentai Kiramager	Rap	2020	TV Asahi	
Kikai Sentai Zenkaiger	It's the Ancestors! The Great Spirit World, Happy Birthday to Infinite New Year's!, & Dad's Rescue, One Chance!	2021	TV Asahi	
Avataro Sentai Donbrothers	Santa Struggling, Off-Putting Family	2022	TV Asahi	
Bakuage Sentai Boonboomger	Holy Night Presents	2024	TV Asahi	

==== Metal Hero ====
Series	Episode	Year	Channel	Description
Space Sheriff Shaider	The Masked Dancing Choir	1984	TV Asahi	
Jikuu Senshi Spielban	All Happiness • Packer Doesin't the Dream	1986	TV Asahi	
The Mobile Cop Jiban	Clash! Christmas Final Battle!!	1989	TV Asahi	
Special Rescue Exceedraft	Christmas Eve of the Final Fight	1992	TV Asahi	
Blue SWAT	Gold Platinum: Combat Impossible!	1994	TV Asahi	
Juukou B-Fighter	A Christmas Eve Memory	1995	TV Asahi	
B-Fighter Kabuto	The No-Rules Peak Battle	1996	TV Asahi	

=== Rankin/Bass ===
==== MOM Productions/Video Tokyo Productions ====
Special	Year	Channel	Description
Rudolph the Red-Nosed Reindeer	1964		
The Little Drummer Boy	1968		
Santa Claus Is Comin' to Town	1970		
The Year Without a Santa Claus	1974		
The First Christmas: The Story of the First Christmas Snow	1975		
Rudolph's Shiny New Year	1975		
The Little Drummer Boy, Book II	1976		
Nestor, the Long-Eared Christmas Donkey	1977		
Rudolph and Frosty's Christmas in July	1979		
Jack Frost	1979		
Pinocchio's Christmas	1980		
The Leprechauns' Christmas Gold	1981		
The Life and Adventures of Santa Claus	1985		

==== Television Corporation of Japan (TCJ) ====
Special	Year	Channel	Description
Cricket on the Hearth	1967		

==== Mushi Production ====
Special/series	Episode	Year	Channel	Description
Frosty the Snowman		1969		
Festival of Family Classics	A Christmas Tree	1972		

==== Topcraft/Pacific Animation Corporation (PAC) ====
Special	Year	Channel	Description
Twas the Night Before Christmas	1974		
Frosty's Winter Wonderland	1976		
The Stingiest Man in Town	1978		
Santa Baby	2001		

Note: All Rankin/Bass Christmas specials were written and designed in the United States, and then animated in Japan; both in the stop-motion "Animagic" and traditional animation. Some of the holiday classics aired on television networks and were also available on VHS tapes, LaserDiscs, DVDs and Blu-ray Discs in Japan every Christmas season, like Rudolph the Red-Nosed Reindeer, which aired on the NHK network in 1967.

== Norway ==
=== Christmas calendar series ===
==== NRK ====
Special	Year	Description
Barnas førjulskalender	1970	
Jul i Skomakergata	1979	
Jul i Skomakergata	1981	
Jul i Skomakergata	1984	
Teodors julekalender	1986	
Portveiens julekalender	1987	
Jul i Skomakergata	1988	
Vertshuset den gyldne hale	1989	
Portveiens julekalender	1990	
Teodors julekalender	1991	
Jul på Sesam stasjon	1992	
Jul i Skomakergata	1993	
Vertshuset den gyldne hale	1994	
Amalies jul	1995	
Jul på Sesam stasjon	1996	
Amalies jul	1997	
Jul i Skomakergata	1998	
Jul i Blåfjell	1999	
Amalies jul	2000	
Jul i Blåfjell	2001	
Jul på Månetoppen	2002	
Jul i Skomakergata	2003	
Jul i Blåfjell	2004	
Jul på Månetoppen	2005	
Jul i Svingen	2006	
Barnas Superjul med Willys jul	2007	
Jul i Blåfjell	2008	
Jul i Svingen	2009	
Jul på Månetoppen / Pagten	2010	

==== TV 2 ====
- 1994: The Julekalender
- 1995: Julefergå
- 1996: The Julekalender
- 1998: Julefergå
- 2000: Vazelina Hjulkalender
- 2001: Olsenbandens første kupp
- 2002: Vazelina Hjulkalender
- 2003: The Julekalender
- 2004: Olsenbandens første kupp
- 2005: Vazelina hjulkalender
- 2006: Jul i Valhall
- 2007: Olsenbandens første kupp
- 2008: The Julekalender
- 2009: Vazelina Hjulkalender
- 2010: Olsenbanden Jr's Første Kupp

==== TVNorge ====
- 2001: Nissene på låven
- 2003: Nissene på låven
- 2004: Ungkarsnissen
- 2005: Nissene på låven
- 2006: Jul i Tøyengata
- 2007: Nissene på låven
- 2009: Jul i Tøyengata
- 2010: Den unge Fleksnes (På MAX sendes Nissene på låven)
- 2011: "Nissene over skog og hei"
- 2012: Nissene på låven

==== TV3 ====
- 2005: Tjuefjerde

== Sweden ==
- SVT's Christmas calendar, a new series every year since 1960, broadcast daily on 1–24 December
- Sagan om Karl-Bertil Jonssons julafton (Christopher's Christmas Mission) (1975)
- Svensson, Svensson Christmas Special (Svensson firar jul) (Season 1, Episode 7, 1994)

== Other countries ==
- Living with Lydia: Merry Christmas Lydia (2004) - Singapore
- A.T.O.M.: Enter the Dragon (2005) - France
- Pucca: Pucca Claus Part 1: 'Tis the season for REVENGE!/Pucca Claus Part 2: Northern Lights Out/Pucca Claus Part 3: Secret Santa (2006) - South Korea
- The Haunted House Christmas Special: Grandma's Wish, Wheat Donggwi from North Korea (신비아파트 크리스마스 특별편: 할머니의 소원, 북에서 온 밀동귀) (2020) - South Korea
- Charlie's Christmas (L'Enfant au grelot) (1998) - France
- The Crumpets: Joyeux Noël et Bonne Année (2017) - France
- Santa's Christmas Snooze (Le Père Noël et le magicien) (1995) - France
- Santa Claus and the Magic Drum (Joulupukki ja noitarumpu) (1996) - Finland
- ABS-CBN Christmas specials (1992, 1996–ongoing) - Philippines

== See also ==
- Apollo 8 Genesis reading
- Christmas in the media
- Nordic Christmas calendar
- List of A Christmas Carol adaptations
- List of theatrical Christmas films
- List of made-for-television and direct-to-video Christmas films
- Christmas music
- Santa Claus in film
- List of Halloween television specials
- List of St. Patrick's Day television specials
- List of Thanksgiving television specials
- List of Easter television episodes
- List of Valentine's Day television specials
- List of Independence Day television specials
