= List of Valentine's Day television specials =

This article is a list of Valentine's Day-themed television episodes and specials.

== Children and family shows ==
- 6teen: "Stupid Over Cupid" (2005)
- The 7D: "For the Love of Cheese" (2014)
- 101 Dalmatians: The Series: "Valentine Daze" (1997)
- A Little Curious: "Warm, Cool, Heart" (1999)
- Abby Hatcher: Hearts and Hugs Day (2019)
- The Adventures of Jimmy Neutron, Boy Genius: "Love Potion 976/J" (2004)
- Adventures in Wonderland: "A Change of Heart" (1993)
- Alice's Wonderland Bakery: "A Heart-Filled Harmony" (2024)
- The Amazing World of Gumball: "The Matchmaker" (2017)
- American Dragon: Jake Long:
  - "The Ski Trip" (2005)
  - "The Love Cruise" (2007)
- Amphibia: "Dating Season" (2019)
- Angelina Ballerina: "Angelina's Valentine" / "The Royal Banquet" (2002)
- Angelina Ballerina: The Next Steps: "Angelina and the Big News" / "Angelina's Secret Valentine" (2010)
- Annoying Orange:
  - "Passion of the Fruit" (2010)
  - "Annoying Valentines/Annoying Valentines (Sitcom Version)" (2011)
  - "Valentine's Candy Crush" (2015)
  - "Forbidden Love" (2017)
- The Backyardigans: "Special Delivery" (2007)
- Barney & Friends: "Be My Valentine Love, Barney" (2000)
- Barney's World: "The Missing Valentine" (2025)
- The Batman: Two of a Kind (2007)
- Bear in the Big Blue House: "Love Is All You Need" (1998)
- Beverly Hills Teens: "Potions of Love" (1987)
- Big City Greens: "Valentine's Dance" (2019)
- Big Nate:
  - "Valentine's Day of Horror" (2022)
  - "Valentine's Day of Horror: Chapter II" (2023)
  - "Valentine's Day of Horror: Chapter III" (2026)
- Blaze and the Monster Machines: "Valentine's Day Rescue" (2024)
- Blue's Clues: "Love Day" (2004)
- Blue's Clues & You!:
  - "What I Like About Blue" (2021)
  - "Magenta's Thank You Day Surprise" (2023)
- Blue's Room: "It's Hug Day" (2005)
- The Book of Pooh: "My Gloomy Valentine" (2001)
- Bunsen Is a Beast
  - "Handsome Beast" (2017)
  - "Guinea Some Lovin'!" (2017)
  - "Bromeo and Juliet" (2017)
  - "Beauty or the Beast" (2018)
- The Busy World of Richard Scarry:
  - "The First Valentine Ever" (1997)
  - "Be My Valentine" (1997)
- Caillou:
  - "Mystery Valentine" (2000)
  - "Caillou's Valentines" (2007)
- Camp Lazlo
  - "Valentine's Day" (2007)
  - "Lazlo's First Crush" (2007)
- Captain Flamingo: "Change of Heart" (2007)
- The Care Bears:
  - "The Care Bears Adventures in Wonderland" (1987)
  - "The Lost Gift / Lotsa Heart's Wish" (1988)
- The Cat in the Hat Knows a Lot About That!: "Pick Your Friends" (2011)
- ChalkZone: Pop Goes The Balloon (2003)
- The Charlie Brown and Snoopy Show: "Lucy Loves Schroeder" (1985)
- Clifford the Big Red Dog:
  - "T-Bone, Dog About Town" / "Clifford's Big Heart" (2001)
  - "Big Hearted T-Bone" / "Cleo's Valentine Surprise" (2002)
  - "Clifford's Big Heart" / "Cleo's Valentine Surprise" (2003)
- Clifford the Big Red Dog (2019): "Clifford's Valentine Collection" (2021)
- Clifford's Puppy Days:
  - "Your Secret Valentine" / "Perfect Pet" (2004)
  - "Valentines Schmalentines" / "Sweetheart's Dance" (2006)
- ComiColor Cartoons: "The Queen of Hearts" (1934)
- Crashbox: "Mugshots:"Valentine's Day" (1999)
- Curious George: "Happy Valentine's Day, George" (2015)
- Cyberchase:
  - "Hugs & Witches" (2003)
  - "A Garden Grows in Botlyn" (2020)
- Daniel Tiger's Neighborhood: "It's Love Day!/Daniel's Love Day Surprise" (2015)
- Danny Phantom: "Lucky in Love" (2005)
- Darkwing Duck: "My Valentine Ghoul" (1992)
- Dinosaur Train:
  - "Erma and the Conductor" (2012)
  - "Love Day" (2020)
- Doc McStuffins: "My Huggy Valentine" (2013)
- Dora the Explorer:
  - "Te Amo" (2001)
  - "Best Friends" (2005)
  - "The Grumpy Old Troll Gets Married" (2011)
- Doug: "Doug Plays Cupid" (1999)
- Dragon Tales: "Hands Together" (2001)
- DuckTales: "A DuckTales' Valentine" (1990)
- Ed, Edd n Eddy: "Ed, Edd n Eddy's Hanky Panky Hullabaloo" (2005)
- Elena of Avalor: "Sweetheart's Day" (2020)
- The Emperor's New School: "Everyone Loves Kuzco" (2008)
- The Fairly OddParents:
  - "Love Struck!" (2003)
  - "Love at First Height" (2005)
  - "Love Triangle" (2011)
- Fanboy & Chum Chum: "Robo-mance" (2012)
- Fancy Nancy: "Mon Amie... Grace?" (2019)
- Fish Hooks
  - "Two Clams in Love" (2011)
  - "Bea Dates Milo" (2012)
  - "Oscar's Secret Admirer" (2012)
  - "Send Me an Angel Fish" (2012)
  - "Fish Lips Sink Ships" (2012)
  - "Fish Prom" (2013)
  - "Live at the Hamsterwood Bowl" (2013)
  - "Labor of Love" (2013)
- Franklin: "Franklin's Valentines" (1998)
- Gabby's Dollhouse: "Happy Kitty-tine's Day!" (2025)
- Go, Diego, Go!: "Sammy's Valentine" (2007)
- Go, Dog. Go!: "A Ball for All" (2021)
- The Grim Adventures of Billy & Mandy
  - "Love is "Evol" Spelled Backwards" (2003)
  - "The Greatest Love Story Ever Told Ever" (2007)
- Gravity Falls: "The Love God" (2014)
- Handy Manny:
  - "Valentine's Day" (2008)
  - "Valentine's Day Party" (2013)
- Harvey Beaks: "Anti-Valentine's Day" (2015)
- Hey Arnold!: "Arnold's Valentine" (1997)
- Hey Duggee: "The Love Badge" (2025)
- Henry Hugglemonster: "Monsterly Ever After" (2015)
- Higglytown Heroes: "A Valentine for Miss Fern; The Totally Secret Valentine" (2006)
- House of Mouse: "Goofy's Valentine Date" (2001)
- If You Give a Mouse a Cookie: "If You Give a Mouse a Valentine's Cookie" (2020)
- Iron Man and His Awesome Friends: "Ultron Ruins Valentine's Day" (2026)
- Jacob Two-Two: "Jacob Two Two and the Valentine's Day Disaster" (2005)
- Johnny Bravo: "It's Valentine's Day Johnny Bravo" (2004)
- Kate & Mim-Mim: "Valentine Friends" (2014)
- Katie and Orbie: "Hearts!" (2002)
- Kick Buttowski: Suburban Daredevil
  - "For the Love of Gunther" (2010)
  - "Love Stinks!" (2011)
  - "Bromance" (2012)
- Kim Possible: "The Cupid Effect" (2007)
- Kindergarten (TV series): "Be My Valentine" (2001)
- Kindergarten: The Musical: "Berti and the Amazing Candy-Coated Cottage" / "Beet Juice" (2025)
- Lilo & Stitch: The Series: "Hunkahunka" (2004)
- Little Bear: "Valentines Day" (1999)
- Little Einsteins: "Annie's Love Song" (2007)
- The Little Lulu Show: "Valentine's Day" (1996)
- Llama Llama: "I Heart You!" (2018)
- Lloyd in Space: "Love Beam #9" (2002)
- Looney Tunes Cartoons: "Looney Tunes Cartoons Valentine's Extwavaganza!" (2022)
- The Loud House:
  - "Singled Out/Brave the Last Dance" (2020)
  - "My Phony Valentine/"Man of My Schemes" (2026)
- Madeline: "Madeline's Valentine" (2001)
- Martha Speaks: "Martha and the Thief of Hearts" (2009)
- Max & Ruby: "Max's Valentine" (2003)
- Maya & Miguel: "Cupid" (2007)
- Mickey Mouse:
  - "Goofy's First Love" (2015)
  - "Locked in Love" (2017)
- The Magic School Bus: "Gets Charged" (1997)
- Mickey Mouse Clubhouse: "A Surprise for Minnie" (2006)
- Mickey Mouse Funhouse: "Happy Pal-entine's Day!" (2025)
- Mickey and the Roadster Racers/Mickey Mouse Mixed-Up Adventures:
  - "The Happiest Helpers Cruise!" (2017)
  - "Happy Valentine Helpers" (2020)
- Mighty Express: "Chug-a-Love Day" (2021)
- Minnie's Bow-Toons:
  - "Camp Minnie: My Bunny Valentine" (2024)
  - "Pet Hotel: Galentine's Day" (2026)
- Miss BG: "Miss BG’s Gets a Valentine" (2005)
- Molly of Denali: "Valentine's Day Disaster/Porcupine Slippers" (2020)
- Muppet Babies: "Happy Villain-tine's Day" (2022)
- Muppet Babies: "My Muppet Valentine" (1987)
- My Friends Tigger & Pooh: "How to Say I Love Roo" (2007)
- My Little Pony: Friendship Is Magic:
  - "Hearts and Hooves Day" (2012)
  - "The Break Up Break Down" (2018)
- My Little Pony: Tell Your Tale: ° “Secret Ad-mare-er” (2023)
- Nature Cat: "Happy Halentine's Day!" (2016)
- The New Adventures of Winnie the Pooh: "Un-Valentine's Day" (1989)
- The New Woody Woodpecker Show: "Date With Destiny" (2000)
- Nilus the Sandman: "Cupid's Bow" (1996)
- Ni Hao, Kai-Lan:
  - "The Ladybug Festival" (2009)
  - "Kai-Lan's Big Surprise" (2009)
- Oobi: "Valentine" (2005)
- Paw Patrol / Rubble & Crew:
  - "Pups Save Friendship Day" (2016)
  - "The Crew Builds a Giant Turtle House" (2025)
- PB&J Otter: "Ducking Out on Valentine's Day" (2000)
- Peanuts by Schulz:
  - "A Little Love" (2016)
  - "Just for Love" (2016)
- Peg + Cat: "The Valentine's Day Problem" (2017)
- Peppa Pig: "Valentine's Day" (2020)
- Peppa Pig Tales:
  - "Valentine's Pizza" (2023)
  - "Valentine's Surprise" (2023)
  - "Disco Limo" (2024)
  - "Valentines Day" (2025)
  - "Tunnel of Love" (2025)
  - "Valentine's Spy Mission" (2026)
- Pepper Ann: "A Valentine's Day Tune" (2000)
- The Penguins of Madagascar:
  - "Monkey Love" (2009)
  - "Otter Things Have Happened" (2009)
  - "Love Takes Flightless" (2012)
  - "Tunnel of Love" (2015)
- Phineas and Ferb:
  - "That Sinking Feeling" (2009)
  - "Act Your Age" (2015)
- Pinkalicious & Peterrific:
  - "Pink Love" (2019)
  - "Cupid Calls It Quits" (2021)
- The Pink Panther: "Valentine Pink" (1993)
- Pixel Pinkie:
  - "Valentine's Day" (2009)
  - "Truth Or Dare" (2009)
- The Powerpuff Girls: "Keen On Keane" (2002)
- Puppy Dog Pals:
  - "Valentine Surprise" (2019)
  - "Valentine's Day Mix-Up" (2020)
  - "My Bobby Valentine" (2021)
  - "A Valentine's Gift for Ana" (2022)
- Pupstruction: "Valentine's Day Dogs" (2024)
- Rainbow Parade: "Cupid Gets His Man" (1936)
- Recess : "My Funny Valentines" (2000)
- The Replacements
  - "CindeRiley" (2006)
  - "The Perfect Date" (2007)
  - "Kumquat Day" (2007)
- Robot and Monster: "J.D. Loves Gart" / "Misery Date" (2015)
- Rock Paper Scissors: "Paper's Big Lie" (2024)
- Rocko's Modern Life:
  - "Love Spanked" (1993)
  - "S.W.A.K." (1996)
- Rolie Polie Olie: "Looove Bug" (1999)
- Rugrats / All Grown Up!:
  - "Be My Valentine" (2000)
  - "It's Cupid, Stupid" (2004)
- Robogobo: "A Valentine for Pupsicle" (2026)
- The Save-Ums!: "Make Those Valentines!" (2005)
- Sesame Street: "Chicken Valentine" (1973)/"Elmo Loves You" (2009)/"Episode 4606: Valentine's Day" (2016)
- Sheriff Callie's Wild West: "The Heartless Valentine's Day" (2017)
- The Smurfs: "My Smurfy Valentine" (1983)
- The Snoopy Show: "Well, I’ll be a Brown-Eyed Beagle" (2022)
- The Spectacular Spider-Man: "Gangland" (2009)
- Spidey and His Amazing Friends: "Villaintines Day" (2024)
- Spirit Riding Free: Riding Academy: "Palentine's Day" (2020)
- SpongeBob SquarePants:
  - "Valentine's Day" (2000)
  - "Krusty Love" (2002)
  - "Gary in Love" (2010)
  - "Tunnel of Glove" (2011)
  - "Love That Squid" (2011)
  - "Married to Money" (2016)
- Stranger Things: Tales from '85:
  - "Chapter Four: The Séance" (2026)
  - "Chapter Five: Split the Party" (2026)
- Strawberry Shortcake: Berry in the Big City:
  - "Will You Be My Lemon-tine?" (2022)
  - "Aunt Praline's Sweetie Pie" (2024)
- Sunny Bunnies:
  - "Sunny Valentine's Day" (2018)
  - "St. Valentine's Treasure" (2019)
  - "Valentine Party" (2020)
- SuperKitties: "Vanishing Valentines" (2024)
- Super Monsters: "Monster Heart-Friend Night" (2019)
- Super Why: "Peter Rabbit" (2009)
- Teacher's Pet: "Taint Valentine's Day" (2002)
- Teen Titans: "Date with Destiny" (2004)
- Teen Titans Go!:
  - "Be Mine" (2014)
  - "How 'Bout Some Effort" (2016)
  - "Looking for Love" (2023)
- Teletubbies: "Love Each Other Very Much" (2023)
- Thomas & Friends: “Rosie is Red” (2018)
- Thomas & Friends: All Engines Go:
  - "A Very Percy Valentine's Day" (2023)
  - "Valentine's Hearts" (2023)
- Timmy Time: "Timmy The Postman" (2010)
- Timon & Pumbaa: "Timon in Love" (1999)
- Timothy Goes to School: "Be My Valentine" (2002)
- Totally Spies!:
  - "MAtchMaker" (2002),
  - "Green With N.V." (2003)
- T.O.T.S.: "The Valentine Spirit" (2020)
- Trolls: TrollsTopia: "Palentine's Day" (2021)
- T.U.F.F. Puppy:
  - "Puppy Love" (2010)
  - "Snap Dad" (2011)
  - "Love Bird" (2013)
  - "Til Doom Do Us Part" (2014)
  - "Girlfriend or Foe?" (2014)
  - "T.U.F.F. Love" (2015)
- True and the Rainbow Kingdom: "Happy Hearts Day" (2019)
- Uncle Grandpa: "Uncle Cupid" (2016)
- Underdog: "Simon Says, Be My Valentine" (1967)
- Unikitty!: "Perfect Moment" (2019)
- Vampirina: "Vee Is for Valentine" (2018)
- The VeggieTales Show: "The Power of Love" (2020)
- Wallykazam!:
  - "Buddy Pal Friend Day" (2016)
  - "The Chickephant's Getting Married" (2017)
- Wander Over Yonder: "The Date" (2014)
- The Weekenders: "My Punky Valentine" / "Brain Envy" (2001)
- Welcome to Pooh Corner: "Pooh's Funny Valentine's Day" (1984)
- What's New, Scooby-Doo?: "A Scooby-Doo Valentine" (2005)
- The Wild Thornberrys: "Operation Valentine" (2001)
- Wonder Pets!: "Save the Lovebugs!" (2010)
- Woody Woodpecker: "I'm with Cupid, Stupid" (2018)
- Wordgirl: "Cherish is the Word" (2011)
- WordWorld: "My Fuzzy Valentine" / "Love, Bug" (2009)
- Wow! Wow! Wubbzy!:
  - "Mr. Valentine" (2007)
  - "Cupid's Helper" (2009)
  - "My Speedy Valentine" (2009)
- Yo Gabba Gabba: "Love" (2008)
- Zombies: The Re-animated Series: "Crazy, Stupid, Crush" (2024)

== Anime ==
To Be Added

== Comedy-Drama ==
- And Just Like That: "February 14th" (2023)
- Desperate Housewives:
  - "Love is in the Air" (2005)
  - "Thank You So Much" (2006)
  - "Is This What You Call Love" (2012)
- Early Edition: "Funny Valentine" (1999)
- Elsbeth: "Tiny Town" (2025)
- Gilmore Girls: "A Vineyard Valentine" (2006)
- Las Vegas: "Tainted Love" (2005)
- The Love Boat:
  - "The Zinging Valentine/The Very Temporary Secretary/Final Score" (1979)
  - "The Love Boat: A Valentine Voyage" (1990)
- Nobody Wants This: "Valentine's Day" (2025)

== Dramas ==
- 7th Heaven:
  - "Happy's Valentine" (1997)
  - "Loves Me, Loves Me Not" (2000)
  - "V-Day" (2001)
  - "Hot Pants" (2002)
  - "Red Socks" (2005)
  - "Love and Obsession" (2006)
  - "Tit for Tat" (2007)
- 9-1-1: "Heartbreaker" (2018)
- 21 Jump Street: "Chapel of Love" (1988)
- Arrow:
  - "Guilty" (2014)
  - "Draw Back Your Bow" (2014)
  - "Suicidal Tendencies" (2015)
  - "Broken Hearts" (2016)
  - "The Sin-Eater" (2017)
  - "Past Sins" (2019)
  - "Brothers and Sisters" (2019)
- Blue Bloods: "My Funny Valentine" (2011)
- Boardwalk Empire: "The Old Ship of Zion" (2013)
- Bones: "The Bikini in the Soup" (2011)
- Brothers & Sisters: "Valentine's Day Massacre" (2007)
- Castle
  - "The Final Nail" (2011)
  - "Reality Star Struck" (2013)
- Charmed
  - "Animal Pragmatism" (2000)
  - "Carpe Demon" (2005)
  - "Engaged and Confused" (2006)
- CSI: NY: "Blood Actually" (2013)
- Downton Abbey: "Episode One" (2013)
- Dr. Quinn, Medicine Woman: "What is Love?" (1995)
- ER:
  - "Make of Two Hearts" (1995)
  - "Be Still My Heart" (2000)
  - "All in the Family" (2000)
- Everwood: "My Funny Valentine" (2003)
- The Flash (2014):
  - "Attack on Central City" (2017)
  - "Love Is A Battlefield" (2020)
- Good Trouble: "Palentine's Day" (2020)
- Grey's Anatomy:
  - "Valentine's Day Massacre" (2010)
  - "All You Need Is Love" (2012)
- Hawaii Five-0:
  - "E ʻImi pono" (2015)
  - "Hoa 'inea" (2016)
  - "Poniu I Ke Aloha" (2017)
  - "He kauwa ke kanaka na ke aloha" (2020)
- House: "Insensitive" (2007)
- Mad Men:
  - "For Those Who Think Young" (2008)
  - "A Day's Work" (2014)
- Medium: "The One Behind the Wheel" (2007)
- Once Upon a Time: "Skin Deep" (2012)
- Picket Fences: "Be My Valentine" (1993)
- The Resident: "Stupid Things in the Name of Sex" (2019)
- The Rookie:
  - "Heartbreak" (2019)
  - "The Gala" (2025)
  - "Burn 4 Love" (2026)
- Supergirl: "Mr. & Mrs. Mxyzptlk" (2017)
- This Is Us:
  - "Jack Pearson's Son" (2017)
  - "Songbird Road: Part Two" (2019)
  - "The Night Before the Wedding" (2022)
- Tru Calling: "Valentine" (2004)
- Wonder Woman: "I Do, I Do" (1977)

== Horror ==
- Into the Dark:
  - "Down" (2019)
  - "My Valentine" (2020)
  - "Tentacles" (2021)
- Supernatural:
  - "My Bloody Valentine" (2010)
  - "Love Hurts" (2016)

== Animated sitcoms ==
- American Dad!: "May the Best Stan Win" (2010)
- Big Mouth: "My Furry Valentine" (2019)
- Bob's Burgers:
  - "My Fuzzy Valentine" (2013)
  - "Can't Buy Me Math" (2015)
  - "The Gene and Courtney Show" (2016)
  - "Bob Actually" (2017)
  - "V for Valentine-detta" (2018)
  - "Bed, Bob & Beyond" (2019)
  - "Romancing the Beef" (2021)
- Family Guy:
  - "Valentine's Day in Quahog" (2013)
  - "Boy (Dog) Meets Girl Dog" (2018)
- Futurama:
  - "Put Your Head on My Shoulders" (2000)
  - "Love and Rocket" (2002)
- Harley Quinn: "Harley Quinn: A Very Problematic Valentine's Day Special" (2023)
- King of the Hill:
  - "I Remember Mono" (1998)
  - "I'm With Cupid" (2002)
- The Proud Family: "I Love You Penny Proud" (2002)
- The Proud Family: Louder and Prouder: "The End of Innocence" (2023)
- The Simpsons:
  - "I Love Lisa" (1993)
  - "I'm with Cupid" (1999)
  - "Love, Springfieldian Style" (2008)
  - "The Daughter Also Rises" (2012)
  - "Specs and the City" (2014)
  - "Love Is in the N2-O2-Ar-CO2-Ne-He-CH4" (2016)
- Solar Opposites: "An Earth Shatteringly Romantic Solar Valentine's Day Opposites Special" (2024)
- South Park:
  - "Tom's Rhinoplasty" (1998)
  - "Cupid Ye" (2023)

== Comedy & sitcoms ==
- 2 Broke Girls: "And the Broken Hearts" (2012)
- 3rd Rock from the Sun: "Dick Puts the 'ID' in Cupid" (2000)
- 8 Simple Rules: "Torn Between Two Lovers" (2005)
- 30 Rock:
  - "Up All Night" (2007)
  - "St. Valentine's Day" (2009)
  - "Anna Howard Shaw Day" (2010)
  - "Hey, Baby, What's Wrong" (2012)
- A Different World:
  - "Dr. Cupid" (1988)
  - "Breaking Up Is Hard To Do" (1989)
  - "Love, Hillman-Style" (1991)
- Abbott Elementary:
  - "Valentine's Day" (2023)
  - "District Budget Meeting" (2024)
  - "Candygrams" (2026)
- About a Boy: "About a Cat Party" (2015)
- According to Jim: "Blow-Up" (2002)
- The Adventures of Ozzie and Harriet: "The Valentine Show" (1953)
- Alice: "My Funny Valentine Tux' (1980)
- American Housewife: "Time For Love" (2017)
- Are We There Yet?: "The Valentine's Day Episode" (2011)
- Arrested Development: "Marta Complex" (2004)
- At Home with Amy Sedaris: "Valentine's Day" (2020)
- Becker:
  - "Love! Lies! Bleeding!" (1999)
  - "V-Day" (2002)
- Better With You: "Better With Valentine's Day" (2011)
- The Big Bang Theory:
  - "The Large Hadron Collision" (2010)
  - "The Tangible Affection Proof" (2013)
  - "The Locomotive Manipulation" (2014)
  - "The Valentino Submergence" (2016)
- Black-ish / Mixed-ish:
  - "Big Night, Big Fight" (2015)
  - "The Name Game" (2017)
  - "Dreamgirls and Boys" (2019)
  - "The Gauntlet" (2020)
  - "This Charming Man" (2020)
- Bob Hearts Abishola: "Black Ice" (2020)
- Boy Meets World:
  - "Risky Business" (1994)
  - "First Girlfriend's Club" (1998)
  - "My Baby Valentine" (1999)
- Brothers: "Valentine's Day" (2026)
- Cheers: "Sam Time Next Year" (1991)
- City Guys: "Dating Games" (2000)
- The Cleveland Show:
  - "A Short Story and a Tall Tale" (2011)
  - "Here Comes the Bribe" (2013)
- Coach: "Call Me Cupid" (1995)
- Community:
  - "Communication Studies" (2010)
  - "Early 21st Century Romanticism" (2011)
- The Conners: "Valentine's Day Treats and Credit Card Cheats" (2024)
- Cosby: "Valentine's Day" (1997)
- Cybill:
  - "Call Me Irresponsible" (1995)
  - "Valentine's Day" (1997)
- Dave's World: "Loves Me Like a Rock" (1996)
- Dr. Ken:
  - "Dave's Valentine" (2016)
  - "A Dr. Ken Valentine's Day" (2017)
- Everybody Hates Chris: "Everybody Hates Valentine's Day" (2006)
- Everybody Loves Raymond:
  - "Diamonds" (1997)
  - "Silent Partners" (2001)
- The Facts of Life:
  - "Cupid's Revenge" (1987)
- Family Matters:
  - "My Broken-Hearted Valentine" (1992)
  - "Heart Strings" (1993)
  - "Le jour d'amour" (1997)
- Family Reunion: "Remember My Funny Valentine?" (2021)
- Frasier:
  - "Three Valentines" (1999)
  - "Out With Dad" (2000)
- Frasier (2023):
  - "Cyrano, Cyrano" (2024)
- Friends/Joey:
  - "The One with the Candy Hearts" (1995)
  - "The One with Unagi" (2000)
  - "The One with the Birthing Video" (2002)
  - "The One with Phoebe's Wedding" (2004)
  - "Joey and the Valentine's Date" (2005)
- The Fresh Prince of Bel Air: "Stop Will in the Name of Love" (1994)
- Full House:
  - "Little Shop of Sweaters" (1989)
  - "The Heartbreak Kid" (1993)
  - "Joey's Funny Valentine" (1994)
  - "Dateless in San Francisco" (1995)
- George Lopez: "The Valentine's Day Massacre" (2003)
- Ghosts: "A Date to Remember" (2023)
- Gimme a Break!: "Valentine" (1984)
- Girlfriends:
  - "Bad Timing" (Season 1, Episode 14) (2001)
  - "Happy Valentine's Day...Baby?" (Season 3, Episode 15) (2003)
  - "Comedy of Eros" (Season 4, Episode 13) (2004)
  - "Great Sexpectations" (Season 5, Episode 14) (2005)
  - "Time To Man Up" (Season 7, Episode 14) (2006)
- The Goldbergs / Schooled:
  - "Lainey Loves Lionel" (2016)
  - "Agassi" (2017)
  - "My Valentine Boy" (2019)
  - "Preventa Mode" (2020)
  - "A Peck of Familial Love" (2022)
  - "Singled Out" (2020)
- The Golden Girls: "Valentine's Day" (1989)
- Grace Under Fire: "Valentine's Day" (1994)
- Happy Days: "Be My Valentine" (1978)
- Happy Endings: "The St. Valentine's Day Maxssacre" (2012)
- Head of the Class: "Valentine's Day" (1987)
- Herman's Head: "My Funny Valentine" (1993)
- Home Improvement:
  - "Baby, It's Cold Outside" (1992)
  - "A Funny Valentine" (1997)
- Honey, I Shrunk the Kids: The TV Show: "Honey, I'm in the Mood for Love" (1998)
- How I Met Your Father: "A Terrible, Horrible, No Good, Very Bad Valentine's Day" (2023)
- How I Met Your Mother:
  - "Rabbit or Duck" (2010)
  - "Desperation Day" (2011)
  - "The Drunk Train" (2012)
- In the House: "My Crazy Valentine" (1996)
- The Jeffersons: "I Buy the Songs" (1981)
- The King of Queens:
  - "S'Ain't Valentine's" (1999)
  - "Meet By-Product" (2000)
  - "Animal Attraction" (2003)
  - "Gorilla Warfare" (2005)
- Last Man Standing: "Tasers" (2014)
- Less than Perfect: "Valentine's Day" (2003)
- Letterkenny: "Valentimes Day" (2019)
- Life in Pieces:
  - "Tattoo Valentine Guitar Pregnant" (2016)
  - "Necklace Rescue Chef Negotiator" (2017)
- Life with Derek: "Rumor Mill" (2008)
- Living Single: "Singing the Blues" (1995)
- The Loretta Young Show: "The Black Lace Valentine" (1959)
- Love & War: "Valentine's Day" (1995)
- Mad About You:
  - "Love Among the Tiles" (1993)
  - "Valentine's Day" (1999)
- Major Dad: "Valentine's Day" (1991)
- Malcolm in the Middle: "If Boys Were Girls" (2003)
- Mama's Family: "My Phony Valentine" (1989)
- Man with a Plan:
  - "Valentine's Day" (2017)
  - "Adam's Turtle-y Awesome Valentine's Day" (2018)
- The Many Loves of Dobie Gillis: "Lassie Get Lost' (1963)
- Married... with Children:
  - "Peggy Loves Al - Yeah, Yeah, Yeah" (1988)
  - "Valentine's Day Massacre" (1994)
- Meet the Browns:
  - "Meet the Not-So-Funny Valentine" (2010)
- The Middle:
  - "Valentine's Day" (2010)
  - "Valentine's Day II" (2011)
  - "Valentine's Day III" (2012)
  - "Valentine's Day IV" (2013)
  - "Valentine's Day VI" (2015)
- Mike & Molly:
  - "First Valentine's Day" (2011)
  - "Valentine's Piggyback" (2012)
- Modern Family:
  - "My Funky Valentine" (2010)
  - "Bixby's Back" (2011)
  - "Heart Broken" (2013)
  - "Valentine's Day 4: Twisted Sister" (2015)
  - "Do You Believe in Magic" (2017)
  - "Written in the Stars" (2018)
  - "Paris" (2020)
- Mom: "Sparkling Banter and a Failing Steel Town" (2019)
- Mr. Belvedere: "Valentine's Day" (1986)
- Mrs. Brown's Boys: "Mammy's Valentine" (2013)
- Murphy Brown: "Why Do Fools Fall in Love?" (1989)
- The Nanny:
  - "Love is a Many Blundered Thing" (1996)
  - "The Bank Robbery" (1997)
- Newhart: "Once I Had a Secret Love" (1985)
- New Girl:
  - "Valentine's Day" (2012)
  - "The Crawl" (2015)
  - "Operation: Bobcat" (2017)
- Night Court: "Billie's Valentine" (1985)
- Not Dead Yet: "Not a Valentine Yet" (2024)
- Andy J: "Tilt My Hat (At the Sun)" (2005)
- The Office:
  - "Valentine's Day" (2006)
  - "Blood Drive" (2009)
  - "The Manager and the Salesman" (2010)
  - "PDA" (2011)
  - "Special Project" (2012)
  - "Couples Discount" (2013)
- One Day at a Time: "One Valentine's Day at a Time" (2019)
- Parks and Recreation:
  - "Galentine's Day" (2010)
  - "Operation Ann" (2012)
  - "Galentine's Day" (2014)
- Punky Brewster: "My Aged Valentine" (1985)
- The Really Loud House: "Louds in Love" (2024)
- Reba: "Valentine's Day" (2003)
- Rita Rocks: "What's Love Got to Do with It" (2009)
- Roseanne: "Valentine's Day" (1991)
- Sabrina the Teenage Witch:
  - "First Kiss" (1997)
  - "The Equalizer" (1998)
  - "Sabrina, the Matchmaker" (1999)
  - "Love in Bloom" (2000)
  - "Love Is a Many Complicated Thing" (2001)
  - "I Think I Love You" (2002)
- The Santa Clauses: "Chapter Eight: Floofy" (2023)
- See Dad Run: "See Dad Nail Valentine’s Day" (2014)
- Shifting Gears: "Valentine's" (2025)
- Single Parents:
  - "A Cash-Grab Cooked Up By the Crepe Paper Industry" (2019)
  - "Chez Second Grade" (2020)
- Sister, Sister:
  - "Valentine's Day" (1996)
  - "Three the Heart Way" (1997)
  - "Ladies' Choice" (1998)
- Son of a Critch: "My Funny Valentine" (2024)
- Speechless:
  - "V-a-l-Valentine's D-a-Day" (2017)
  - "J-i-Jimmy V-a-l-Valentine" (2019)
- Step by Step: "Love, Port Washington Style" (1993)
- Still Standing: "Still Romancing" (2003)
- Suburgatory: "Blowtox and Burlap" (2013)
- Superstore:
  - "Valentine's Day" (2017)
  - "Love Birds" (2019)
- That '70s Show/That '80s Show:
  - "First Date" (1999)
  - "Donna's Panties" (2001)
  - "Valentine's Day" (2002)
  - "Kelso's Career" (2002)
  - "Babe I'm Gonna Leave You" (2003)
  - "Killer Queen" (2006)
- That Girl: "The Earrings" (1969)
- Two and a Half Men:
  - "Sips, Sonnets and Sodomy" (2012)
  - "Advantage: Fat, Flying Baby" (2013)
- Two Guys, a Girl and a Pizza Place: "Two Guys, a Girl and Valentine's Day" (1999)
- Two of a Kind: "First Crush" (1998)
- Up All Night: "Day After Valentine's Day" (2012)
- Veronica's Closet: "Veronica's Candy Panties" (2000)
- Webster: "Love Papadapolis Style" (1986)
- Wendell & Vinnie: "Valentine's & the Cultural Experience" (2013)
- What I Like About You:
  - "Valentine's Day" (2003)
  - "Stupid Cupid" (2005)
- Who's The Boss?: "Jonathon Plays Cupid" (1986)
- Will & Grace: "Dance Cards & Greeting Cards" (2005)
- Wings: "Looking for Love in All the Wrong Places" (1991)
- With Love: "Valentine's Day" (2023)
- The Wonder Years: "St. Valentine's Day Massacre" (1990)
- The Wonder Years (2021): "The Valentine's Day Dance" (2022)
- Work With Me: "Crush"
- Yes, Dear: "House of Cards" (2003)
- Young & Hungry: "Young & Valentine's Day" (2017)

== Teen shows ==
- 90210: "Of Heartbreaks and Hotels" (2009)
- 13 Reasons Why:
  - "Tape 3, Side B" (2017)
  - "Valentine's Day" (2020)
- Awkward: "The New Sex Deal" (2014)
- The Baby-Sitters Club: "Mary Anne and the Great Romance" (2021)
- Beverly Hills, 90210:
  - "You Gotta Have Heart" (1995)
  - "Bleeding Hearts" (1996)
  - "My Funny Valentine" (1997)
  - "Cupid's Arrow" (1998)
  - "Beheading St. Valentine" (1999)
  - "The Final Proof" (2000)
- Buffy the Vampire Slayer: "Bewitched, Bothered and Bewildered" (1998)
- California Dreams: "My Valentine" (1995)
- Chilling Adventures of Sabrina: "Chapter Fourteen: Lupercalia" (2019)
- Clueless: "Child Bride" (1999)
- Dawson's Creek:
  - "The Valentine's Day Massacre" (2000)
- Free Rein: "Free Rein: Valentine’s Day" (2019)
- Glee:
  - "Silly Love Songs" (2011)
  - "Heart" (2012)
  - "I Do" (2013)
- Gossip Girl: "Crazy, Cupid, Love" (2012)
  - "It-Girl Happened One Night" (2011)
- Grand Army: "Valentine's Day" (2020)
- Greek: "Love, Actually, Possibly, Maybe... or Not" (2010)
- H_{2}O: Just Add Water: "Valentine's Day" (2009)
- Henry Danger: "My Phony Valentine" (2015)
- High School Musical: The Musical: The Series: "Valentine’s Day" (2021)
- Jonas: "Love Sick" (2009)
- Life with Boys: "Girl-Entine's Day With Boys" (2013)
- Lizzie McGuire: "First Kiss" (2002)
- Make It or Break It: "Loves Me, Loves Me Not" (2010)
- My Life as Liz: "My Sketchy Valentine" (2010)
- Ned's Declassified School Survival Guide: "Valentine's Day & School Websites" (2006)
- The Naked Brothers Band: "Valentine Dream Date" (2009)
- Nicky, Ricky, Dicky & Dawn: "Valentime's Day" (2015)
- The O.C:
  - "The Heartbreak" (2004)
  - "The Lonely Hearts Club" (2005)
  - "The Heavy Lifting" (2006)
  - "The Case of the Franks" (2007)
- One Tree Hill: "Valentine's Day Is Over" (2011)
- Pepper Ann: "A Valentine's Day Tune" (2000)
- Pretty Little Liars: "The New Normal" (2011)
- Saved by the Bell: "Isn't It Romantic?" (1992)
- The Secret Circle: "Valentine" (2012)
- Switched at Birth: "Human/Need/Desire" (2013)
- That '70s Show:
  - "First Date" (1999)
  - "Donna's Panties" (2001)
  - "Kelso's Career" (2002)
  - "Killer Queen" (2006)
- That's So Raven: "Hearts and Minds" (2004)
- True Jackson, VP: "True Valentine" (2010)
- Wizards of Waverly Place: "Potion Commotion" (2008)
- Hannah Montana: "Jake...Another Little Piece Of My Heart" (2009)

== Reality shows ==
- Cake Boss:
  - "Roses, Romance, and Romeo" (2010)
  - "Baby Special" (2012)
  - "Kid Crush and Carnival" (2015)
- Chrisley Knows Best: "My Chrisley Valentine" (2015)
- Dance Moms: "Boy Crazy, Mom Crazy" (2013)
- The Girls Next Door: "Hearts Afire" (2007)
- Kate Plus 8: "Valentine's Day" (2008)
- The Little Couple: "It's Valentine's Day" (2011)
- Nickelodeon's Unfiltered: "Be My Valentine!" (2021)
- The Osbournes: "Valentine Daze" (2004)
- OutDaughtered: "My Busby Valentine" (2020)
- The Real Housewives of Orange County: "Valentines and Birthday Wishes" (2014)
- Sister Wives:
  - "4 Wives, 4 Valentine's" (2012)
  - "Robyn's Secret" (2013)
- Teen Mom: "Valentine's Day" (2010)
- This Is Daniel Cook.: "Making a Valentine's Day Card" (2006)

== Specials ==
- The Muppets Valentine Show (1974/ABC)
- Be My Valentine, Charlie Brown (1975/CBS)
- A Special Valentine with the Family Circus (1978)
- The Honeymooners Valentine Special (1978)
- Bugs Bunny's Valentine (1979/CBS)
- The Popeye Valentine Special: Sweethearts at Sea (1979/CBS)
- The Pink Panther in: Pink at First Sight (1981/ABC)
- The Berenstain Bears' Comic Valentine (1982/NBC)
- The Valentine's Day that Almost Wasn't (1982)
- I Love the Chipmunks Valentine Special (1984)
- DTV Valentine (1986)
- DTV Doggone Valentine (1987)
- Cathy's Valentine (1989/CBS)
- Winnie the Pooh: A Valentine for You (1999/ABC)
- A Charlie Brown Valentine (2002/ABC)
- Madly Madagascar (2013)
- Michael Bolton's Big, Sexy Valentine's Day Special (2017/Netflix)
- Nickelodeon's Not So Valentine's Special (2017)

== See also ==
- List of films set around Valentine's Day
- Lists of television specials
- List of United States Christmas television episodes
- List of United States Christmas television specials
- List of Christmas television specials
- List of Easter television specials
- List of Halloween television specials
- List of St. Patrick's Day television specials
- List of Thanksgiving television specials
- List of Independence Day television specials
