= OFD =

OFD may refer to:

- Oakland Fire Department
- Occupancy frequency distribution
- OFD Ostfriesischer Flugdienst, a German regional airline
- Ogof Ffynnon Ddu, an extensive cave system in South Wales
- One Fine Day (U.S. TV series), a 2007–2008 American Internet Protocol television series
- Orange Fire Department
- Orofaciodigital syndrome
