= List of Independence Day television specials =

The following is a list of Independence Day-related television episodes and specials.

== Animated shows ==
- Animaniacs:
  - "The Flame / Wakko's America / Davey Omelette / Four Score & Seven Migraines Ago" (1993)
  - "The Presidents Song / Don't Tread on Us / The Flame Returns" (1995)
- Annoying Orange: "Orange of July" (2010)
- Casper the Friendly Ghost: Red, White and Boo (1955)
- Celebrity Deathmatch "4th of July Celebration" (1999)
- Futurama: "A Taste of Freedom" (2002)
- Goof Troop: "Major Goof" (1992)
- The Harper House: "Home Alone on the 4th of July" (2021)
- Histeria!: "The Tom Jefferson Program" (1998)
- Kevin: "Fourth of July" (2026)
- Kidsongs:
  - "Sing Out America" (1986)
  - "Livin' in the USA" (1988)
- King of the Hill: "Born Again on the Fourth of July" (2009)
- Let's Go Luna!: "Yankee Doodle Andy" (2021)
- Looney Tunes: "Ant Pasted" (1953)
- Martha Speaks: "Martha Puts Out the Lights" (2009)
- Merrie Melodies: "Old Glory" (1939)
- Mickey Mouse Works: "Donald's Failed Fourth" (1999)
- Pac-Man and the Ghostly Adventures: "Pac to the Future" (2013)
- Peppa Pig Tales: Independence Day (2023)
- Popeye the Sailor Man: Patriotic Popeye (1957)
- Porky Pig: Old Glory (1939)
- Regular Show: "Firework Run" (2013)
- Rugrats: "Barbeque Story" (1991)
- Sesame Street: "Episode 5034: Fourth of July" (2020)
- Schoolhouse Rock!: "Fireworks" (1976)
- Shining Time Station: "Mr. Conductor's Fourth of July" (1993)
- The Simpsons:
  - "Summer of 4 Ft. 2" (1996)
  - "Dangerous Curves" (2008)
  - "The Yellow Badge of Cowardge" (2014)
- South Park: "Summer Sucks" (1998)
- Teen Titans "Revolution" (2004)
- Tom and Jerry: "Safety Second" (1950)
- Tom and Jerry Tales: “The Declaration of Independunce” (2007)

== Dramas/Sitcoms ==
- Riverdale: “Chapter Fifty-Eight: In Memoriam” (2019)
- Saved by the Bell: "Fourth of July" (1991)
- The Adventures of Pete & Pete: "Grounded for LIfe" (1994)
- Modern Family:
  - "Summer Lovin'" (2015)
  - "I Love a Parade" (2018)

== Action/Adventure ==
- The Hardy Boys/Nancy Drew Mysteries: "Oh Say Can You Sing" (1978)
- Magnum, P.I.: "Home From the Sea" (1983)
- “”Stranger Things: Season 3

== Specials ==
- Ben and Me (1953)
- Lady and the Tramp II: Scamp's Adventure (2001)
- Uncle Sam Magoo (1970)
- 1776 (film) (1972)
- Yankee Doodle Cricket (1975)
- Sausage Party (2016)

== See also ==
- List of Christmas television specials
- List of Halloween television specials
- List of Thanksgiving television specials
- List of Easter television episodes
- List of Valentine's Day television specials
- List of St. Patrick's Day television specials
