= List of television specials on Australian television in 2008 =

This is a list of television specials which first aired on Australian television in 2008. The list is arranged in chronological order. Where more than one programming changed was made on the same date, those changes are listed alphabetically.

== List ==
Date	Program	Channel
Domestic
25 January	Australia Day Live	Nine Network
13 February	The Apology to the Stolen Generations of Australia	ABC1
13 February	The National Apology	SBS TV
26 February	2008 Allan Border Medal	Nine Network
15 March	2008 Movie Extra Filmink Awards	Movie Extra
31 March	2008 Melbourne International Comedy Festival	Network Ten
19 and 20 April	2020 Summit	ABC1 / ABC2
26 April	MTV Australia Video Music Awards 2008	MTV
27 April	2008 Antenna Awards	Channel 31
4 May	50th Annual TV Week Logie Awards	Nine Network
11 May	National Nine News Special: Madeleine: A Year of Mystery: Her Parents' Story	Nine Network
22 and 24 June	Schapelle Corby: The Hidden Truth	Nine Network
1 July	2008 ARIA Hall of Fame	VH1
15–21 July	World Youth Day 2008	SBS TV
28 July	2008 Helpmann Awards	Bio.
20 August	Keating!	ABC2
9 September	2008 Dally M Awards	Fox Sports
21 September	Your Money: How to Survive the Crisis of 2008	Seven Network
22 September	2008 Brownlow Medal	Network Ten
24 September	The Season's Best	Seven Network
11 October	2008 Nickelodeon Australian Kids' Choice Awards	Nickelodeon
12 October	Minding Your Money	Seven Network
12 October	2008 Deadly Awards	SBS TV
19 October	Minding Your Money: An Audience with the Prime Minister	Seven Network
19 October	2008 ARIA Music Awards	Network Ten
19 October	2008 Andrew Olle Media Lecture	ABC1
29 October	Opera Australia's La bohème	ABC2
1 November	Countdown to 111 HITS	111 Hits/FOX8
4 November	Mr Firth Goes to Washington	SBS TV
13 November	2008 Inside Film Awards	SBS TV
19 November	Hamish & Andy Re-Gifted	Network Ten
20 November	Adam Hills Live	ABC1
24 November	Weddings: Where are they Now?	Nine Network
27 November	2008 Walkley Awards	SBS TV
6 December	2008 AFI Awards	Nine Network
6 and 13 December	2008 Rock Eisteddfod	Nine Network
7 December	Schools Spectacular: The Best of 25 Years	ABC2
7 December	The Australian's Women's Weekly Christmas Special	Nine Network
14 December	2008 Schools Spectacular	ABC1
17 December	AC/DC Legends of Rock	Seven Network
20 December	The Making of Shane Warne: The Musical	Network Ten
20 December	2008 Carols in the Domain	Seven Network / Disney Channel
24 December	2008 Carols by Candlelight	Nine Network
25 December	2008 Australian Dancesport Championships	Seven Network
25 December	2008 World Latin Championships	Seven Network
31 December	Happy News Year	ABC2
31 December	Sydney New Year's Eve	Network Ten
International
1 January	(Austria) 2008 Vienna New Year's Concert	SBS TV
1 January	(United States) 118th Annual Rose Parade	Seven Network
28 January	(United States) 14th Screen Actors Guild Awards	Showcase
4 February	(United States) Super Bowl XLII	SBS TV
5 February	(United Kingdom) The Kylie Show	Seven Network
11 February	(United States) 50th Grammy Awards	FOX8
11 February	(United Kingdom) 61st British Academy Film Awards	Arena
25 February	(United States) 80th Academy Awards	Nine Network
13 March	(United Kingdom) 2008 BRIT Awards	Channel V
24 March	(United States) Famous, Fabulous and Filthy Rich	Network Ten
12 April	(United Kingdom) It's Me or the Fat Dog	Network Ten
16 June	(United States) 62nd Tony Awards	Bio.
22 June	(United States) Come Rain or Come Shine: From Grey's Anatomy to Private Practice	Seven Network
28 June	(United Kingdom) Nelson Mandela's 90th Birthday Concert	ABC1
1 July	(United States) / (United Kingdom) World's Got Talent	Seven Network
5 July	(United States) An Audience with the cast of Wicked	W.
13 July	(United States) Analyzing the Laughter: Frasier	TV1
14 July	(United States) 2008 Miss Universe Pageant	Seven Network
17 July	(United States) ~~19th GLAAD Media Awards~~ (Note: The 19th GLAAD Media Awards was originally scheduled to air on 5 June 2008 at 9:30 pm on Arena. This was then later changed to 17 July at 8:30 pm. However, due to fact that the US production was unable to get international clearance for music rights, Arena was unable to broadcast the ceremony.)	Arena
20 July	(United States) ABBA: The Mamma Mia! Story	Seven Network
22 September	(United States) 2008 Primetime Emmy Awards	Arena
22 September	(United States) 2008 Primetime Emmy Awards	Network Ten
Still to debut	(United Kingdom) Jetman Live	Nat Geo Adventure
24 November	(United States) 2008 American Music Awards	FOX8
27 November	(United States) Forbes 20 Under 25: Young, Rich and Famous	Network Ten
2 December	(United States) 2008 Scream Awards	Sci Fi Channel
24 December	2008 Victoria's Secret Fashion Show	Network Ten
28 December	2008 World Music Awards	ABC2
31 December	(United Kingdom) Last Night of the Proms 2008	UK.TV / BBC HD
31 December	(United Kingdom) 2008 Edinburgh Military Tattoo	ABC1

== See also ==
- Lists of television specials
