= List of St. Patrick's Day television specials =

The following is a list of St. Patrick's Day-related television episodes and specials.

== Animated shows ==
- American Dragon Jake Long:
  - "The Heist" (2005)
  - "Fool's Gold" (2006)
- Andy J: "I Will Have You" (2007)
- Annoying Orange:
  - "Luck o' the Irish" (2010)
  - "The Leprechaun Trap" (2012)
  - "Infinite Leprechauns!" (2018)
  - "Leprechaun Flu" (2019)
- Are You Afraid Of The Dark?: "The Tale of Jake And The Leprechaun" (1990)
- Bob's Burgers: "Flat-Top o' the Morning to Ya" (2020)
- The Busy World of Richard Scarry: "Patrick Pig Learns To Talk" (1994)
- The Care Bears: "Grumpy's Three Wishes" (1986)
- Casper The Friendly Ghost: "Spooking with a Brogue" (1955)
- Chicago Party Aunt: "St. Patrick's Day" (2022)
- Chip 'n Dale: Rescue Rangers: "The Last Leprechaun" (1989)
- Curious George: "Chasing Rainbows" (2009)
- Doc McStuffins: St. Patrick's Day Dilemma (2016)
- The Doodlebops: Moe's Lucky Clover (2007)
- Dorothy the Dinosaur (TV series): "Irish Dancing" (2007)
- Droopy: "Droopy Leprechaun" (1958)
- DuckTales: "Luck O' the Ducks" (1987)
- Extreme Ghostbusters: "The Luck of the Irish" (1997)
- The Fairly OddParents: "Crocker of Gold" (2010)
- Futurama: "The Luck of the Fryrish" (2001)
- The Garfield Show: "Lucky Charm" (2009)
- Handy Manny: "St. Patrick's Day" (2012)
- The Huckleberry Hound Show: "Huck of the Irish" (1961)
- Inspector Gadget: "Luck of the Irish" (1983)
- Kids Incorporated : "The leprechaun" (1984)
- Johnny Bravo: "Blarney Buddies" (1997)
- Jackie Chan Adventures: "Tough Luck" (2002)
- Noveltoons: "Leprechaun's Gold" (1949)
- The Leprechauns' Christmas Gold: a Rankin-Bass St. Patrick's Day/Christmas special (1981)
- Lil' Bush: "St. Patrick's Day" (2008)
- Lippy the Lion & Hardy Har Har: "Shamrocked" (1963)
- Looney Tunes Cartoons: "Lepreconned" (2021)
- Looney Tunes:
  - The Wearing of the Grin (1951)
  - Shamrock and Roll (1969)
- The Loud House: "No Such Luck" (2017)
- Martin Mystery: Rage of the Leprechaun (2006)
- Mickey Mouse Clubhouse: Minnie's Rainbow (2009)
- Mickey Mouse Mixed-Up Adventures: "Petey O'Pete" (2020)
- Monsters vs. Aliens: "When Luck Runs Out" (2014)
- Mucha Lucha: "Shamrock and Roll" (2004)
- My Friends Tigger and Pooh: "Chasing Pooh's Rainbow" (2007)
- Murray Has a Little Lamb: "Irish Step Dancing School" (2007)
- New Looney Tunes: "Erin Go Bugs" (2018)
- Phineas and Ferb: "Just Our Luck" (2014)
- Polly Pocket (2018): "Lepre-Can't" (2022)
- President Curtis: Knox (2026)
- Puppy Dog Pals:
  - "Somewhere Under the Rainbow" (2020)
  - "Pups of the Dance" (2021)
  - "Find That Fiddle" (2022)
- The Ren & Stimpy Show: "A Hard Day's Luck" (1994)
- The Real Ghostbusters: "The Scaring of the Green" (1987)
- Rupert Bear: "Rupert And the leprechauns" (1992)
- Rugrats/All Grown Up!:
  - "Lady Luck" (1998)
  - "Tweenage Tycoons" (2003)
  - "Lucky 13" (2004)
- Scooby-Doo and Scrappy-Doo: "Scooby's Luck of the Irish" (1981)
- Screen Songs: "The Emerald Isle" (1949)
- The Simpsons:
  - "Whacking Day" (1993)
  - "Homer vs. the Eighteenth Amendment" (1997)
  - "Sex, Pies and Idiot Scrapes" (2008)
- South Park: Credigree Weed St. Patrick's Day Special (TV Episode 2022)
- Strawberry Shortcake: Berry in the Big City: "Lucky Berry" (2022)
- The Super Mario Bros. Super Show!: "Mighty McMario and the Pot of Gold" (1989)
- Teen Titans Go!:
  - "Beast Boy's Bad Luck, and It's Bad" (2016)
  - "The Gold Standard" (2017)
- Teletubbies: "Irish Dancing" (1998)
- The Tom and Jerry Show: "The Wearing of the Green" (2021)
- Topo Gigio: "Topo Gigio Pretends To Be Irish For Saint Patrick's Day" (March 13, 1966)
- Uncle Grandpa: "The Lepre-Con" (2016)
- Woody Woodpecker: "His Better Elf" (1958)

== Dramas ==
- Beverly Hills, 90210: "The Leprechaun" (1999)
- Boardwalk Empire: "Nights in Ballygran" (2010)
- Bonanza: "Hoss and the Leprechauns" (1963)
- Boston Blue: "St. Patrick's Day" (2026)
- Charmed: "Lucky Charmed" (2003)
- Chicago Med: "Twist & Shout" (2026)
- CSI: NY: "Pot of Gold" (2010)
- Daredevil: Born Again: "With Interest" (2025)
- Early Edition: "Luck O' The Irish" (2000)
- Law & Order: Criminal Intent: "Silencer" (2007)
- Lie to Me: "Sweet Sixteen" (2010)
- Love/Hate: Season 3, Episode 1 (2012)
- 9-1-1: Boston" (Season 5, Episode 12) (2018)

== Sitcoms ==
- 2 Broke Girls: "And the Kilt Trip" (2014)
- 30 Rock:
  - "The Funcooker" (2009)
  - "St. Patrick's Day" (2012)
- According to Jim: "The Thin Green Line" (2006)
- The Afterparty: "High School" (2022)
- ALF: "Superstition" (1989)
- All in the Family: "Too Good Edith" (1979)
- Bewitched:
  - "The Leprechaun" (1966)
  - "If the Shoe Pinches" (1970)
  - "Out of the Mouths of Babes" (1971)
- Cheers:
  - "Bar Wars III: The Return of Tecumseh" (1990)
  - "Bar Wars VII: The Naked Prey" (1993)
- The Crazy Ones: "March Madness" (2014)
- The Drew Carey Show: "The Sex Drug" (1998)
- Extended Family: "The Consequences of Being Irish" (2024)
- The Flying Nun: "May the Wind Be Always at Your Back" (1968)
- Ghosts:
  - "St. Hetty's Day" (2025)
  - "St. Hetty's Day 2: The Help" (2026)
- Grounded for Life: "It's Hard to Be a Saint in the City" (2004)
- Happy Days: "Joanie's Weird Boyfriend" (1977)
- Home Improvement: "Desperately Seeking Willow" (1998)
- How I Met Your Mother: "No Tomorrow" (2008)
- It's Always Sunny in Philadelphia: "Charlie Catches a Leprechaun" (2016)
- Laverne and Shirley: "The Slow Child" (1978)
- Letterkenny: "St. Patrick's Day Special" (2017)
- The Lucy Show: "Lucy Meets a Millionaire" (1964)
- Mike & Molly: "St. Patrick's Day" (2013)
- The Office: "St. Patrick's Day" (2010)
- One Fine Day: "Veteran Status" (2008)
- Only Fools and Horses: "It's Only Rock and Roll" (1985)
- The Real O'Neals: "The Real Lent" (2016)
- Sabrina the Teenage Witch: "Salem, the Boy" (1999)
- Still Standing: "Still Parading" (2004)
- Superstore: "Playdate" (2020)
- Veronica's Closet: "Veronica Falls Hard" (1999)

== Other ==
- Batman: "The Joker's Flying Saucer" (1968)
- Chopped: "Luck of the Irish " (2018)
- AEW Dynamite: "St. Patrick's Day Slam" (2021)
- The Reluctant Traveler: "Partying on St. Paddy's Day in Ireland" (2025)

== See also ==
- List of films set around St. Patrick's Day
- List of Christmas television specials
- List of United States Christmas television specials
- List of Halloween television specials
- List of Thanksgiving television specials
- List of Easter television specials
- List of Valentine's Day television specials
- List of Independence Day television specials
