= List of films set around Valentine's Day =

This is a list of films set on or around Valentine's Day.

== Animated ==
- A Charlie Brown Valentine - a 2002 animated TV special based on the comic strip Peanuts
- A Special Valentine with the Family Circus - a 1978 animated TV special based on the comic strip The Family Circus
- A Valentine for You - a 1999 TV special based on the Disney television series The New Adventures of Winnie the Pooh
- Be My Valentine, Charlie Brown - a 1975 animated TV special based on the comic strip Peanuts
- Bugs Bunny's Valentine - a 1979 special featuring clips from classic Looney Tunes cartoon shorts
- I Love the Chipmunks - Valentine Special - a 1984 TV special featuring Alvin and the Chipmunks
- Madly Madagascar - a 2013 animated direct-to-DVD special
- The Muppets' Valentine Special - a 1976 variety pilot to "The Muppet Show"
- A Scooby-Doo Valentine - a 2002 television special based on the show What's New Scooby-Doo?
- The Berenstain Bears' Comic Valentine - a 1982 television special based on the show Berenstain Bears
- The Pink Panther in: Pink at First Sight - a 1981 television special based on the show The Pink Panther
- The Valentine's Day That Almost Wasn't - a 1982 HBO special produced by Paul Fusco
- Time for Love (film) - (1935)

== Comedy ==
- I Hate Valentine's Day - a 2009 romantic comedy written and directed by Nia Vardalos
- Obvious Child - a 2014 romantic comedy
- The Old Maid's Valentine - a 1900 short romantic comedy directed by George Albert Smith
- Sleepless in Seattle - a 1993 romantic comedy starring Tom Hanks and Meg Ryan
- Valentine's Day - a 2007 comedy TV special made by the Australian Broadcasting Corporation
- Valentine's Day - a 2010 romantic comedy directed by Garry Marshall
- The Santa Clause 2, a 2002 film directed by Michael Lembeck
- The Santa Clause 3: The Escape Clause, a 2006 film directed by Michael Lembeck
- Love Hurts - a 2025 film directed by Jonathan Eusebio
- Some Like It Hot - a 1959 comedy/musical written and directed by Billy Wilder

== Crime ==
- The St. Valentine's Day Massacre - a 1967 dramatization directed by Roger Corman

== Drama ==
- Eternal Sunshine of the Spotless Mind - a 2004 romantic drama written by Charlie Kauffman and directed by Michel Gondry
- An Affair to Remember - a 1957 drama starring Cary Grant and Deborah Kerr

== Horror ==
- Hospital Massacre - a 1982 horror film also known as Be My Valentine, or Else...
- My Bloody Valentine - a 1981 slasher film directed by George Mihalka
- My Bloody Valentine 3D - a 2009 remake of the 1981 film
- Valentine - a 2001 slasher film, directed by Jamie Blanks
- Lovers Lane - a 1999 slasher film, directed by Jon Steven Ward
- Heart Eyes - a 2025 slasher film, directed by Josh Ruben

== Mystery ==
- Picnic at Hanging Rock - a 1975 mystery drama directed by Peter Weir

== See also ==
- List of Valentine's Day television specials
- Category:Valentine's Day television episodes
