= Murray Cruchley =

Lee Murray is the stage name of Murray Cruchley, a Canadian actor and radio personality.

He is married to Elaine Hamat, a former film executive; he retired from acting in 2021.

== Roles ==
- City on Fire (1979) – Tony Miller
- Death Ship (1980) – Parsons
- Agency (1980) – New Copywriter
- Scanners (1981) – Programmer 1
- Dirty Tricks (1981) – Anchorman
- Countdown to Looking Glass (1984) – James Otis
- Santa Barbara (1985) – Mort Zimmerman
- In Like Flynn (1985) – Fulton
- The Raccoons (1985–1986) – Dan the Forest Ranger
- Bloody Wednesday (1987) – Lou Cramer
- Bluffing It (1987)
- Alfred Hitchcock Presents (1987–1988) – Dr. Stevens
- Dead Ringers (1988) – Assisting Surgeon
- Growing Up in the World Next Door (1988) – Narrator
- Katts and Dog (1989) – Mr. Kirk
- Sing (1989) – Insurance Man
- Street Legal (1989–1992) – Blair Mitchell
- Getting Married in Buffalo Jump (1990) – Robert Marcovich
- Clarence (1990) – English Teacher
- Nilus the Sandman: The Boy Who Dreamed Christmas (1991) – Mr. Fletcher (voice)
- My Secret Identity (1989–1991) – Richard
- RoboCop (1994) – Announcer, Motel Greeter, Man in Lab Coat
- Side Effects (1995) – Dr. Nordover
- Nilus the Sandman: The First Day (1995) – Mr. Hunt
