= Nilus the Sandman: The Boy Who Dreamed Christmas =

- Genre: Musical; Fantasy; Family
- Created by: Michael Fawkes
- Written by: Michael Mercer
- Directed by: Chris Delaney
- Starring: Long John Baldry; Zachary Bennett; Murray Cruchley
- Theme music composer: Rick Fox
- Country of origin: Canada
- Original language: English

Production
- Producers: Chris Delaney; Bruce Glawson; Arnie Zipursky
- Cinematography: Douglas Koch (live action)
- Editor: Jay Houpt (live action)
- Running time: 24 minutes
- Production companies: Delaney & Friends Cartoon Productions, Cambium Film & Video Productions, CTV Television Network (in association with), Téléfilm Canada (with the participation of), The Ontario Film Development Corporation (with the participation of)

Original release
- Network: CTV
- Release: December 1, 1991

Related
- Nilus the Sandman: Monsters in the Closet (1994)

Nilus the Sandman: The Boy Who Dreamed Christmas (also known simply as The Boy Who Dreamed Christmas) is a Canadian part-animated and part-live-action Christmas television special which was originally broadcast on December 1, 1991 on CTV. In the United States, it was first broadcast on The Disney Channel on December 10, 1991. It was followed by two more Nilus the Sandman TV specials which premiered in 1994 and 1995, and then a Nilus the Sandman TV series airing from 1996 to 1998.

== Plot ==
On Christmas Eve, a computer-savvy boy named Peter Fletcher has several items on his Christmas list and wonders if Santa Claus will be able to give him all the things he wants. Peter falls asleep and while he is dreaming he meets Nilus the Sandman who takes him on a magical flight in Peter's shoe to the North Pole to visit Santa at his workshop.

When they arrive, they find that the workshop is dark and without activity, and that Santa and a few of his elves are sitting around and looking depressed. Peter and Nilus discover that Santa has been forced out of work by a robotic clown called the Toymaster whom Santa and his elves originally created as a helper so they could mass-produce toys more efficiently to satisfy children's increasing demand for more toys. The Toymaster gives Peter, Nilus, and Santa a tour of his industrialized high-tech toy factory located underneath Santa's workshop. They see that the Toymaster forces the elves to work to exhaustion amongst a web of assembly lines and conveyor belts controlled by computers, and that the sleigh and reindeer have been replaced by a delivery rocket-plane. After the tour, Peter and Nilus express concern that this situation lacks the true "feeling" and "spirit" of Christmas. Santa laments that children now want far more toys than in the past, and that he and his elves could not satisfy that increased demand.

Peter comes up with the idea of only producing and delivering the top one or two items in each child's list, since children only remember their most special gifts. Since there would be far fewer gifts to make and deliver, Santa could accomplish the task with his elves and reindeer. The group then ponders what to do about the Toymaster. Peter abruptly goes back to the Toymaster's factory with Nilus following close behind. Peter explains to Nilus that during the tour he was able to hack into the Toymaster's computer network, which contains children's gift list information. Peter plans to use the Toymaster's computer terminal to access the gift lists and delete all but the top one or two gifts in each list in order to enable Santa and his helpers to once again make and deliver gifts. He begins by deleting items from his own list, and with each deletion a conveyor belt or other piece of factory hardware disappears, along with any gifts that are on it. He deletes all but his top item, a bicycle, at which point he stops to admire the bike as it comes down a conveyor belt. He comes back to his senses and returns to the computer terminal to finish reducing other children's lists by overriding the system with a single keystroke. However, clicking the key has no effect, and Peter discovers that the Toymaster unplugged the terminal just before Peter clicked the key. The Toymaster grabs Peter and Nilus, puts them on Peter's bike, and pushes them out of the control center. They speed down a path toward a fork in the road, at which point Peter decides to sacrifice his beloved bike for the sake of saving Christmas. Peter steers the bike away from the exit and towards the moving gears of the factory's control clock. Peter and Nilus jump off the bike, which then crashes into the gears, jamming them. This causes the factory to explode, destroying the Toymaster and all the gifts.

When the smoke clears, Peter finds that he is outside in the snow. Nilus calls him over to Santa's workshop where he sees that Santa and his elves are busy making gifts. The whole group celebrates, and Peter and Nilus get to ride along with Santa in his sleigh as he takes off on his delivery mission.

Peter wakes up on Christmas Day to find gifts under the tree and in his stocking. Peter empties his stocking and finds a toy train engine (which, in Peter's dream, Santa had mentioned was his favorite toy to make). It comes with a note from Santa apologizing for the loss of Peter's bike and hoping that he enjoys the toy locomotive. Peter then declares that "this really is a merry Christmas".

== Cast ==
- Long John Baldry as Nilus the Sandman
- Zachary Bennett as Peter Fletcher
- Frank Mackay as Santa Claus
- Michael Fawkes as The Toymaster and Newscaster
- Larysa Fenyn as Mrs. Fletcher
- Elizabeth Rukavina as Mrs. Fletcher (voice)
- Chris Delaney as Mr. Fletcher
- Murray Cruchley as Mr. Fletcher (voice)

== Home media releases ==
The Boy Who Dreamed Christmas was released on VHS tape on August 15, 1992 in NTSC format, and on January 1, 2002 in PAL format.

The special was released on DVD in late 2005 in Region 2 as a Daily Mail newspaper promo.

== Sequels and spin-off TV series ==
The Boy Who Dreamed Christmas was followed by two more Nilus the Sandman television specials which also premiered on CTV:

- Nilus the Sandman: Monsters in the Closet is a Halloween special that premiered on October 27, 1994.
- Nilus the Sandman: The First Day is a back-to-school special that premiered on September 3, 1995.

These specials were followed by a Nilus the Sandman TV series, which aired on The Family Channel from October 5, 1996 to November 23, 1998, with a total of 26 episodes over two seasons.

== Award nomination ==
The Boy Who Dreamed Christmas was nominated for a Gemini Award in the category of "Best Animated Program or Series" in 1993.

== See also ==
- List of Christmas films
- Santa Claus in film
