= Open Student Television Network =

- Type: Internet Protocol (IP) television network (IPTV)
- Country: United States
- Availability: United States, Canada, Mexico, United Kingdom
- Founded: 2005 by Indiana University; Case Western Reserve University; Washington University in St. Louis; University of Southern California; Ohio State University Massachusetts Institute of Technology; University of Texas, Austin; Emerson College; Carnegie Mellon University
- Key people: Prashant Chopra, Shane Walker, Rich Griffin, Anthony Davis
- Launch date: February 28, 2005
- Picture format: 480i (SDTV)
- Official website: OSTN.tv

The Open Student Television Network (OSTN), is a USA national student television network, headquartered in downtown Cleveland, Ohio. OSTN was founded in the fall of 2004 and launched its high-bitrate IPTV stream on February 28, 2005.

== History ==
In the fall of 2004, a group of student television station managers met in Cleveland, Ohio, to discuss issues facing student television stations, attempting to program and manage 24/7 schedules with limited financial and production resources. Assisted by technology staff from Case Western Reserve University, the students agreed on a national student television network to share and distribute student content worldwide. Students representing three television stations were present at the initial meeting: Ohio State's Buckeye TV, Carnegie Mellon University, and Case Western Reserve University's IgniteTV, as well as several members of Case Western Reserve University.

OSTN created a national collegiate news show anchored at Northwestern University's Medill School of Journalism. OSTN News content was available via the Associated Press worldwide network of online video distribution.

Over the next several years the network grew to over 600 member schools, who carried the network on both campus cable systems as well as via IPTV deployments on college and university web pages. In the fall of 2007 an enterprise-level broadcast schedule was implemented, allowing OSTN to schedule particular shows and series for the first time.

== OSTN distribution ==
OSTN utilizes a non-traditional method of content and signal distribution, the Internet2 high speed academic network. Whereas a traditional television network sends its programming to affiliates via satellite feeds, OSTN uses a high bandwidth connection via the Internet2 network to directly feed affiliates via standard LAN/WAN connections. Rather than require student television affiliates to purchase and maintain costly microwave, satellite, or dedicated fibre-optic transmission equipment, OSTN allows student stations and member institutions to receive the OSTN channel via existing high-speed IP-based network equipment.

The OSTN stream was initially a 1.6 megabit Windows Media stream, available live 24/7 over Internet2 to all member institutions. Windows Media encoding permitted a true NTSC quality stream of video to be transmitted at a relatively low bitrate. However, the WMV version of OSTN suffered from reliability issues, and was replaced in the fall of 2007 by a highly robust, scalable, and enterprise-grade IPTV distribution system. The current iteration of OSTN is a 2.0-4.0 MPEG-2 program stream, available via the Internet2 network. OSTN's new distribution system will allow the network to eventually offer itself as a 1.5-2.0 megabit H.264 program stream, and will be scalable to future implementations of an OSTN HD offering.

OSTN is delivered to consumers via two methods: over IP to the desktop computer via a web port and via traditional "legacy" CATV systems. When injected onto a legacy CATV system or onto a student television channel, OSTN utilizes a set top box converter device outputting analog NTSC or component video, which is then either mixed with local student TV programming (a network-affiliate model, such as Buckeye TV) or directly inserted onto the CATV line-up as its own separate channel.
