= Niigata Television Network 21 =

Television station in Niigata Prefecture, Japan

JOUX-DTV
- Logo used since 2006

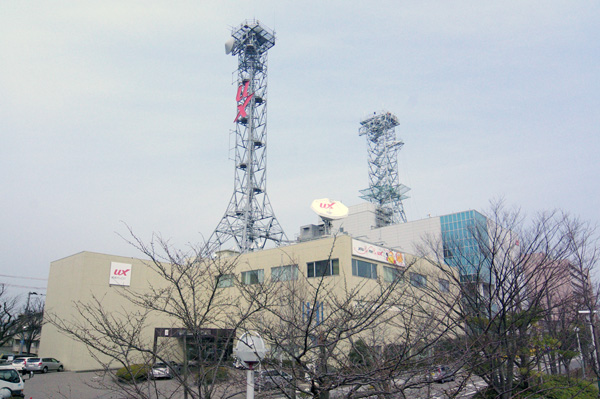
- Niigata Television Network 21 HQ building, Niigata city
- Niigata Prefecture; Japan
- City: Niigata
- Channels: Digital: 23 (UHF); Virtual: 5
- Branding: Niigata Television 21 ux

Programming
- Language: Japanese
- Affiliations: All-Nippon News Network

Ownership
- Owner: The Niigata Television Network 21, Inc.

History
- First air date: October 1, 1983
- Former call signs: JOUX-TV (1983–2011)
- Former channel numbers: 21 (UHF analog, 1983–2011)

Technical information
- Licensing authority: MIC

Links
- Website: uxtv.jp

Corporate information
- Native name: 株式会社新潟テレビ二十一
- Romanized name: Kabushikigaisha Niigata Terebi Nijūichi
- Type: Kabushiki kaisha
- Industry: Television network
- Founded: March 8, 1983; 43 years ago
- Headquarters: 2230-19 Rokunomachi, Shimo-Ogawame-dori, Chūō-ku, Niigata City, Niigata Prefecture, Japan
- Key people: Miki Hibara (President and CEO)
- Owner: TV Asahi Holdings Corporation (18.6%); The Asahi Shimbun (16.5%)
- Subsidiaries: UX Vision Inc.
- Footnotes; Data from its Company Profile and Company History

The Niigata Television Network 21 (株式会社新潟テレビ二十一, Kabushikigaisha Niigata Terebi Nijūichi; UX) is a TV station affiliated with All-Nippon News Network (ANN) in Niigata, Niigata Prefecture. It was established on March 8, 1983 and began broadcasting from October 1, 1983.

The station has been branded as ux since 2006, after the last two letters of the station's call sign. The station's current slogan is YOU&ME&UX.

== History ==
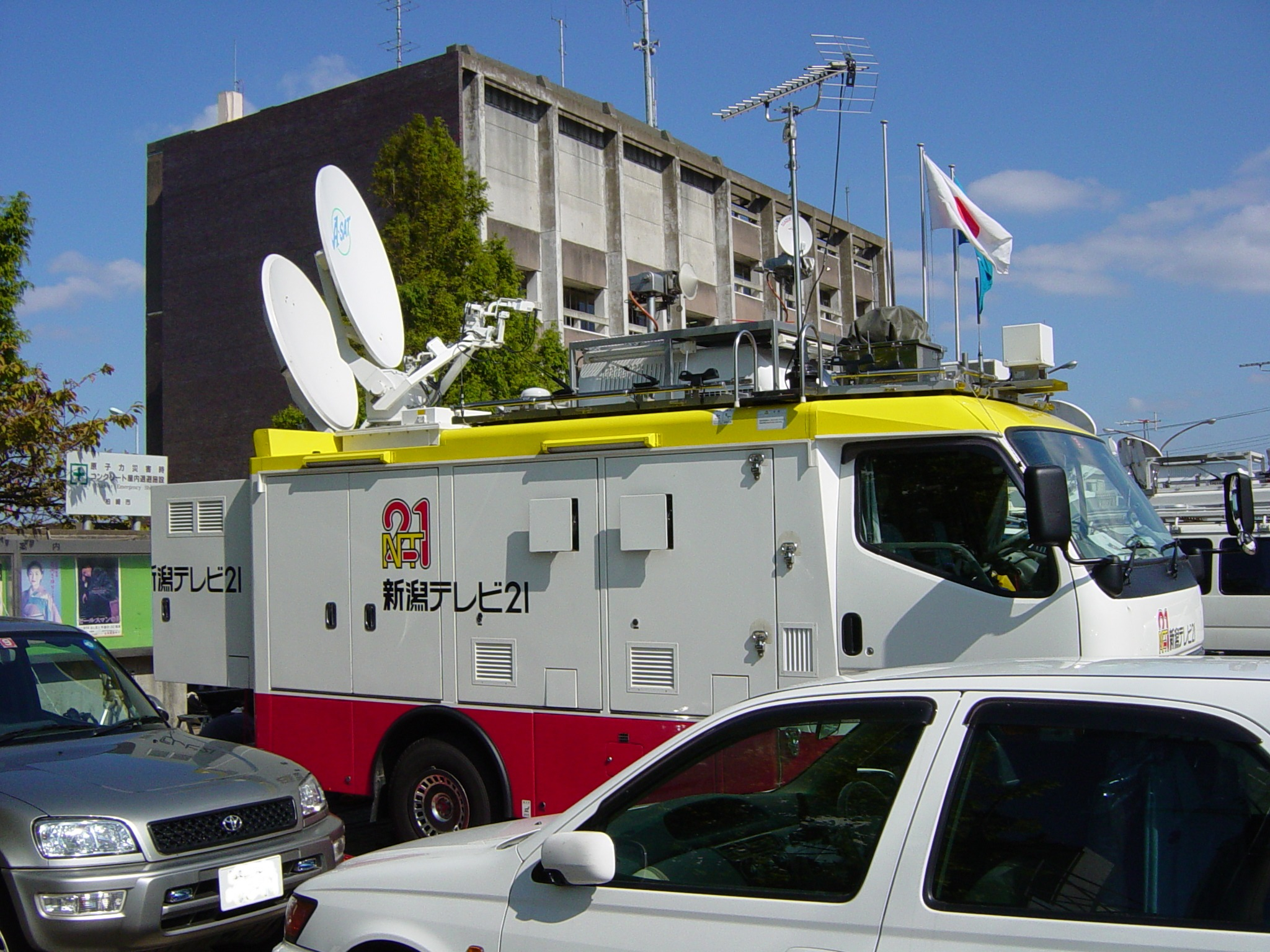
NT21 mobile unit in 2002, featuring the previous station logo and name

Niigata Television Network 21 was established on March 7, 1983 and commenced transmissions at 6:10am on October 1, 1983. Prior to that, TV Asahi programming was seen on NST. NST was affiliated to FNN/FNS, NNN/NNS and ANN, before alleviating the station's network schedule with the launch of TNN (now TeNY), which took over the NNN affiliation in 1981 and NT21, which took over the ANN affiliation in 1983. By then, Niigata has four network stations.

Digital terrestrial test transmissions commenced on August 1, 2006. To mark the occasion, NT21 was rebranded as ux. A full license for digital terrestrial television was granted on September 25, starting on October 1. Aside from airing TV Asahi shows, the station also currently airs a few TV Tokyo shows, since the network does not have a station in most prefectures.
