= One Fine Day (American TV series) =

- Created by: Derek Klein; Marc Morin Jr.
- Developed by: Derek Klein; Marc Morin Jr.
- Starring: Bob Dignan; Daniel Papas; Elisha Reichert; Kevin Zaidaman; Brittney Refakes; Betsy Trevarthen; Jessica DiLiberto; Lance Barke; Colleen Delaney
- Opening theme: "One Fine Day" by Intersection
- Ending theme: "One Fine Day! Theme" by Alexander Hoyne
- Country of origin: United States
- Original language: English
- No. of seasons: 2
- No. of episodes: 12

Production
- Executive producers: Derek Klein; Marc Morin Jr.
- Production locations: Champaign-Urbana, IL
- Camera setup: Single Camera
- Running time: approx. 20 minutes

Original release
- Network: Open Student Television Network iTunes
- Release: October 4, 2007 – April 24, 2008

One Fine Day (OFD) is an American Internet Protocol television series produced in conjunction with students from a variety of Big Ten Universities, such as the University of Illinois at Urbana-Champaign, the University of Iowa, the University of Wisconsin, Purdue University, and Michigan State University. The series premiered on October 4, 2007 and ran for two seasons until April 24, 2008. It is the largest independent media production by students in the Big Ten., and was created by Derek Klein and Marc Morin Jr. OFD is loosely based on the lives of creators Klein & Morin and examines college life from the perspectives of six fictional dorm resident advisors and their friends.

Known as "Dorm Life from the other side", the show deals with the typical themes associated with college life: partying, sexuality, and just trying to find one's self in a changing world. The series is unique in the way that each episode is portrayed through a series of webcam interviews and flash backs told through the eyes of each of the RAs.

== Characters ==
=== Main ===
- Daniel Knolls (Bob Dignan)—In the first season Daniel is a new RA getting acquainted with the responsibilities his job will entail. He is often the individual called in to help assist the other RAs with issues that they would rather not deal with. As the series progresses into the second season, he takes on a mentoring role for Henry and a more mature attitude towards life as a hole.
- Christi Vanderbilt (Elisha Reichert)—Christi is a senior and veteran RA when we are introduced to her in the first season and she is coming to terms with her own sexuality and she begins to pursue a relationship with Alexis Card. She is characterized by her short temper and high strung emotions, yet she feels a deep loyalty towards Daniel with whom she has been good friends with since high school.
- Steven Thompson (Kevin Zaideman)—Ladies man extraordinaire, Steven is the kind of guy girls love and guys love to hate. He never has trouble finding a date, sometimes even scheduling two in a single night. While most of the time Steven comes off as completely self-interested, the other RAs can rely on him for assistance when trouble brews.
- Mitch Michaels (Daniel Papas)—Mitch is the complete opposite of Steven when it comes to the ladies. He is kind, considerate, but more often than not, Mitch befriends the women he is interested in rather than dating them. When Daniel joins the staff, it is up to Mitch to train and educate him. Towards the conclusion of the fall semester, Mitch took an internship position with Rebecca Lane and as such has relocated to Wisconsin.
- Alexis Card (Brittney Refakes)—When we first encounter Alexis in the series first season, she is a hot headed, angry man hating lesbian. She quickly befriends Christi when she berates a resident for his "oogly eyeing". As the series progresses we discover that Alexis had been mistreated by her last boyfriend causing her early distrust of the male gender.
- Monica Burns (Betsy Trevarthen)—Originally a good friend of Mitch's, the two have become closer over time. Monica recently broke up with her boyfriend in Michigan and Mitch decided it was time to tell her how he feels. The two have been dating long distance.
- Katharine Joan (Jessica DiLiberto)—YouTube and Facebook are just two of the addictions of the 21st century that Katharine suffers. Quiet, and often socially awkward, Katharine will spend most of her time behind a computer screen. She joins the staff midyear and slowly develops an attraction to Steven while helping him out with his "girl problems".
- Henry (Lance Barke)—While slow to understand how things are supposed to be done, Henry can take charge when the need be. Like Katharine, Henry is a mid year replacement RA and he soon falls under the tutelage of Daniel Knolls. While sometimes he appears to have trouble taking things seriously, Henry will often snap into a strict and overbearing mentality when dealing with incidents.
- Sandy Clemintine (Colleen Delaney)—Sandy is Henry's girlfriend and a resident at the Chicago Street Residence Hall (C.S.R.). The two are generally seen together and Sandy has been known to assist Henry with his running his programs. The two met while at one of Sandy's sorority mixers and Henry accidentally spilled his drink on her blouse.

=== Supporting ===
- Lani the Desk Clerk (Leilani Marsh)—Lani is one of the few desk clerks that we see at the Chicago Street Residence Hall throughout the series. She operates similar to a 911 dispatcher, sending RAs to areas of the building where they are needed. She is rarely see on screen, rather we often hear her as a voice over a radio.
- Melissa Michaels (Michelle Williams)—Melissa is the older sister and confidant of Mitch. Introduced in the series second season, Melissa is always seen through the means of an internet video chat session with her younger brother, as she lives in Washington state. She often helps Mitch with his female troubles and serves as an anchoring point for him while he is away from campus.
- Janet Card (Courtney Refakes)—Janet is the younger, slightly unbalanced, sister of Alexis. Seen briefly in the final episode of OFD's first season, she has become a recurring stalker of Steven Thompson. To most she appears as a normal, hardworking college sophomore, however, when alone or with Steven, her psychosis becomes apparent.
- Monica Edwards (Jennifer Linsenmeyer)—The second Monica introduced in the series, she is the first romantic interest of Daniel's introduced in the series. She is sarcastic and fun loving, and she has quickly made friends with Sandy as well.
- Old Ben (Daniel Crapnell)—"I've been living in this here courtyard for fifteen years!" Old Ben is a bit of a mystery to many of the residents of C.S.R. As a homeless man, he is said to have been living in the building's courtyard for over a decade. Unknown to most, Ben has keys to many different areas of C.S.R. Many of the RAs pay Ben little attention aside from helping feed his Sprite addiction.
- Drunk David (Joseph Gardner)—A troublesome resident of Daniel's, David shows up time and again throughout the series, normally inebriated and hitting on female residents. At one point, David attempted to reform his ways joining a campus wide Christian promotion cult, but this was short lived and after two weeks he returned to his drunken ways.
- Richard (Ryan Prondzinski)—One of Henry's (and formally Mitch's) residents, Richard serves as a jack-of-all-trades when it comes to giving advice. He often appears briefly to council Henry and help reassure him when he faces either trouble from residents or he is having relationship issues with Sandy.
- Kacey (Mallory Anning)—Kacey is the spunky roommate of Monica Edwards. She loves to party and give Monica a hard time for meeting Daniel at the grocery store and their shared addiction to SpaghettiOs.
- Jacob Winters (Prashanth Venkataramanujam)—A former resident of Daniel, Jacob is the son of a rich shipping merchant and is completely self-centered. He believes the world is there to serve his will, and he attempts to become an RA to exact "justice" on the dorm. When Steven gives him a bad evaluation, Jacob losses his sanity and attempts to burn down C.S.R. He has since been institutionalized.
- C.S.R. Troubadour (Alexander Hoyne)—A resident of C.S.R. throughout the first season, the Troubadour is often found with a guitar in his hand and a song in his heart. His tunes can be heard echoing throughout the halls.

== Episodes ==
=== Season 1 (2007) ===
No. overall	No. in season	Title	Original release date	Prod. code
1	1	"First Language" "Pilot"	October 4, 2007	E1D4A
Daniel learns what it's like to be a RA and how to deal with drunk residents. Meanwhile, Steven has a little fun in Mitch's room.
2	2	"Gender Expression"	October 18, 2007	E2D3
Daniel experiences his first full night of duty alone while Mitch goes out on a date with an old friend. Steven has his exciting S.O.S.S bar crawl and Christi meets a new friend.
3	3	"Mental Ability"	November 1, 2007	E3D4
It's Halloween and time for the annual RA scavenger hunt. Steven, Mitch, and Alexis race across campus in an attempt to solve all the clues while Christi has to help Daniel get to the medical care center before the team finishes the hunt!
4	4	"Sexual Orientation"	November 15, 2007	E4D4A
Christi is having one of the worst duty nights of her life! A mysterious tuba player is running throughout C.S.R. tormenting residents with his noise. Meanwhile, Daniel and Steven try to brighten Mitch's mood and get everyone to play a good old board game. Just don't mention CandyLand in front of Mitch...
5	5	"Learning Style"	November 29, 2007	E5D5B
As Daniel works to complete a film for the annual Dorm Life film festival, Steven must instruct Jacob Winters in what it means to be an RA during his shadow experience. But what happened while Daniel was away for the weekend?
6	6	"Age"	December 13, 2007	E6D2AB
A new RA is hired and Daniel begins his training. Mitch helps Steven overcome his recent failures and Christi and Alexis must come to terms with their relationship. But who is the new RA replacing?

=== Season 2 (2008) ===
No. overall	No. in season	Title	Original release date	Prod. code
7	1	"Culture"	January 31, 2008	E7D2A
Larger cast, larger stories, still your favorite campus! The second season of One Fine Day! picks up a few months after we last left Mitch and the gang. What has everyone been up to? How has Henry adjusted to RA life? Join us and check it out!
8	2	"Religion"	February 14, 2008	E8D2A
Mitch comes back to Champaign-Urbana for a fun filled Valentine's Day weekend! Meanwhile, Daniel and Henry take out Monica Edwards and Sandy on a double date and Steven attempts to find a wingman to go with him to visit the Girls Gone Crazy bus.
9	3	"Educational Level"	February 28, 2008	E9D2
It’s Alexis’ birthday and Christi has a few surprises in store for her! Can Katharine survive her first weekend duty night and help Steven with his “problem”? And what happened with Mitch and Monica?
10	4	"Veteran Status"	March 13, 2008	E10D2
It’s Unofficial St. Patrick’s Day, the time of year when everyone at the U of I gets buck-wild! That is everyone but those who are unlucky enough to draw all day duty! Steven, Alexis, Monica, and Christi spend their day enjoying the alcoholic festivities while Daniel and Katharine are stuck inside dealing with the not so pretty messes left behind. And what is going on between Henry and Sandy?
11	5	"Parental Status"	April 10, 2008	E11D2
As the end of the semester nears, the RAs of C.S.R. begin to plan an end of the year dance as everyone recovers from the events of Unofficial St. Patrick’s day. Will Henry and Sandy work things out? Will Alexis and Christi remember what happened with Steven? And will he be able to face the consequences of his fun with Janet?
12	6	"Geographic Origin"	April 24, 2008	E12D1
An old enemy returns to cause trouble for the RAs of C.S.R. with the help of Janet and Anthony. Will the end of the year semi-formal go off without a hitch? Will Mitch be able to make it to campus?

== Release ==
The complete series has been available on the Open Student Television Network, iTunes, YouTube, and DailyMotion.

== Home media ==
One Fine Day! The Complete Series was released on DVD on October 6, 2008 by Premonition Pictures in conjunction with Amazon.com. The four disc set includes all twelve broadcast episodes and bonus features detailing the series' creation and production.

== Awards and nominations ==
- The Accolade Competition 2007
  - Honorable Mention Leading Actor (Kevin Zaideman for his portrayal of Steven Thompson)
  - Honorable Mention Student Production (Episode 3: Mental Ability)

== Other work ==
- A Certain Point Of View, a feature-length murder mystery from the production team of OFD set in central Illinois.
