= List of Easter television episodes =

Easter-themed television episodes and specials, broadcast on or around Easter, include the following. The holiday itself may or may not feature in the episode.

== Children ==
- American Dragon: Jake Long: "The Egg" (2005)
- Animal Mechanicals: "Mechana Puffin Prize Island" (2010)
- Annoying Orange: "Easter Island" (2012)
- Arthur: "Brain's Brain" (2016)
- As Told By Ginger: "The Easter Ham" (2004)
- Blaze and the Monster Machines: "The 100 Egg Challenge" (2019)
- Bluey: Easter (2021)
- Brandy & Mr. Whiskers: Believe in the Bunny (2005)
- Bubble Guppies: The Oyster Bunny! (2014)
- Bunnicula: The Chocolate Vampire Bunny (2018)
- The Busy World of Richard Scarry:
  - "The First Easter Egg Ever" (1997)
  - "There Really is an Easter Bunny" (1997)
- Care Bears: "An Almost Eggless Easter" (2019)
- Capitol Critters: "Opie's Choice" (1992)
- Curious George: "Flower Monkey / George and the Golden Egg Hunt" (2019)
- Davey and Goliath: Happy Easter (1967)
- Dora the Explorer:
  - Egg Hunt (2003)
  - Dora's Easter Adventure (2012)
- Dr. Zitbag's Transylvania Pet Shop: "Easter Funny" (1995)
- Dragon "Easter Bunny Dragon" (2005)
- Fancy Nancy: "Easter Bonnet Bug a Boo / The Great Easter Bunny Stakeout" (2019)
- Fun Song Factory: "Easter" (2004)
- Gabby's Dollhouse: "The Easter Kitty Bunny" (2022)
- Johnny Test: "It's Easter, Johnny Test!" (2014)
- Kate & Mim-Mim: Mim-Mim's Eggscellent Easter (2016)
- Katie and Orbie: How Orbie Helped the Easter Bunny (1995)
- The Life and Times of Juniper Lee: June's Egg-cellent Adventure: Juniper Lee Meets the Easter Bunny (2006)
- Little Charmers: Sparkle Bunny (2015)
- Looney Tunes:
  - Easter Yeggs (1947)
  - Bugs Bunny's Easter Special (1977, CBS)
  - Daffy Duck's Easter Show (1980, NBC)
  - The Chocolate Chase (1980)
  - Baby Looney Tunes: Eggs-traordinary Adventure (2003)
  - New Looney Tunes: Easter Bunny Imposter / Easter Tweets (2018)
  - Bugs Bunny Builders: The Easter Bunnies (2024)
- Maisy: Eggs (1999)
- Madeline: Madeline and the Easter Bonnet (1993)
- Max & Ruby:
  - Max's Chocolate Chicken (2002)
  - Ruby's Easter Bonnet / Max's Easter Parade / Max & The Easter Bunny (2007)
  - Ruby's Egg Hunt (2019)
- Meg and Mog: "Meg's Egg Hunt" (2010)
- Mickey Mouse Clubhouse:
  - Mickey's Great Clubhouse Hunt (2007)
  - Mickey's Springtime Surprise (2010)
- Mickey Mouse Funhouse: Sitting Ducks (2025)
- Minnie's Bow-Toons: Pet Hotel: ClaraBunny (2026)
- Muppet Babies: Kermit and Fozzie's Eggcellent Adventure (2021)
- Pac-Man and the Ghostly Adventures: Easter Egg Island (2015)
- The Patrick Star Show: Face/Off Model (2024)
- Paw Patrol:
  - Pups Save the Easter Egg Hunt (2014)
  - Pups Save a Sweet Mayor / Pups Save a Magic Trick (2021)
  - Pups and the Power of Flowers / Pups Save the Alien Egg Hunt (2025)
- Peppa Pig:
  - Spring (2010)
  - Easter Bunny (2017)
- Peppa Pig Tales:
  - Easter (2023)
  - Catch The Bunny (2024)
  - Easter Egg Hunt (2025)
  - Easter Evie (2026)
- The Pink Panther: The Easter Panther (1993)
- PJ Masks: Easter Wolfies (2019)
- Pocoyo:
  - Easter Eggs (2017)
  - Nina's Easter Day (2018)
  - The Easter Rabbit (2019)
  - Caterpillar's Egg (2020)
  - Easter Eggs Surprise (2021)
  - Egg-cellent Friends (2023)
- Postcards from Buster: A Capital Egg Hunt (2007)
- Pupstruction: The Egg-Cellent Egg Hunt (2025)
- The Raggy Dolls Easter Bunny (1989)
- Rainbow (TV series): Easter (1987)
- Rocko's Modern Life: From Here to Maternity (1996)
- Rolie Polie Olie: A Polie Egg-Stravaganza (2000)
- Rugrats: Bow Wow Wedding Vows (2002)
- Sid the Science Kid: Rock N Roll Easter (2012)
- The Smurfs Springtime Special (1982)
- Sooty (2011 TV series): "Easter Time" (2013)
- Special Agent Oso: Dye Another Egg (2012)
- SpongeBob SquarePants: Bunny Hunt (2018)
- Sunny Bunnies:
  - Sunny Easter Bunny (2018)
  - Chocolate Bunnies (2019)
- Super Chicken: Easter Bunny (1967)
- Super Duper Bunny League: Chocolate Bunnies! (2025)
- SuperKitties Easter Buddy/Egg Cellent Adventure (2025)
- Team Umizoomi: Umi Egg Hunt (2011)
- Teen Titans Go!:
  - The Teen Titans Go Easter Holiday Classic (2016)
  - Easter Creeps (2017)
  - Booty Eggs (2019)
  - Egg Hunt (2020)
  - Feed Me (2021)
  - Easter Annihilation (2023)
  - Teen Titans and the Easter Factory (2025)
- Teenage Mutant Ninja Turtles (1987):
  - The Turtles and the Hare (1991)
  - Once Upon a Time Machine (1991)
- Teletubbies:
  - Painting Easter Eggs (1998)
  - Finding Chocolate Eggs (1998)
  - Easter Egg Hunt (2023)
  - Tinky Winky can't find eggs (2023)
- Thomas & Friends: All Engines Go: Thomas and Percy's Eggsellent Adventure (2022)
- Tickety Toc: Easter Egg Time/Easter Parade Time (2015)
- Timmy Time: "Timmy's Egg Heads" (2011)
- Total DramaRama: There Are No Hoppy Endings (2019)
- T.O.T.S.: The Ultimate Easter Egg Hunt (2020)
- Uncle Grandpa: "Uncle Easter" (2016)
- VeggieTales:
  - An Easter Carol (2004)
  - 'Twas the Night Before Easter (2011)
- Wallykazam!: Hopgoblin (2015)
- Winnie the Pooh:
  - Springtime with Roo (2004)
  - My Friends Tigger & Pooh: Flowers for Eeyore / Easter Rabbit (2009)
- Wild Kratts: In Search of the Easter Bunny (2020)
- WordGirl:
  - Invasion of The Bunny Lovers (2014)
  - Ears to You (2014)
- Wonder Pets!: Help The Easter Bunny! (2010)
- Woody Woodpecker: The Yolk's on You (2018)
- Wow! Wow! Wubbzy!:
  - Eggs Over Easy (2006)
  - Big Bunny Blues (2009)
- Yakky Doodle: Easter Duck (1961)
- Zack & Quack: The Pop-Up Easter Egg Hunt (2014)

== Comedy ==
- The Cannon and Ball Show: "The Cannon & Ball Easter Show" (1983)
- Baskets: "Easter in Bakersfield" (2016)
- Difficult People: "Passover Bump" (2017)
- Better Things: "Easter" (2019)
- The Righteous Gemstones: "And Yet One of You Is a Devil" (2019)
- Happy!: (Season 2)
- At Home with Amy Sedaris: "Easter" (2020)
- The Santa Clauses: "Chapter Ten: Miracle on Dead Creek Road" (2023)
- Total Drama Island: "Severe Eggs and Pains" (2023)
- Churchy: "Easter" (2024)

== Drama ==
- Bonanza: "Caution, Easter Bunny Crossing" (1970)
- The Waltons: "An Easter Story" (1973)
- The Waltons: "A Walton Easter" Reunion Special (1997)
- Beverly Hills 90210: "The Easter Bunny" (2000)
- Big Love: "Easter" (2006)
- Mad Men: "Three Sundays" (2008)
- Doctor Who: "Planet of the Dead" (2009)
- Jane the Virgin: "Chapter Eighteen" (2015)
- Doctor Who: "Legend of the Sea Devils" (2022)
- Miss Farah (Arabic: الآنسة فرح): "Chapter Eighteen" (Arabic: الفصل الثامن عشر) (2020)

== Sitcoms ==
- Life With Elizabeth: "Easter Eggs" (1952)
- The Jackie Gleason Show: "Easter Hats" (1953)
- The Jack Benny Program: "Easter Show" (1960)
- McHale's Navy: "Chuckie Cottontail" (1965)
- M*A*S*H: "Private Charles Lamb" (1974)
- Happy Days: "Three on a Porch" (1975)
- Laverne and Shirley: “Murder on the Moosejaw Express - Part I” (1980)
- Alice: "Here Comes Alice Cottontail" (1980)
- Father Ted: "Cigarettes and Alcohol and Rollerblading" (1996)
- The Fresh Prince of Bel-Air: "Hare Today..." (1996)
- Vicar of Dibley: "The Easter Bunny" (1996)
- NewsRadio: "Office Feud" (1997)
- The Drew Carey Show: "The Easter Show" (2001)
- Everybody Loves Raymond: "The Canister" (2001)
- My Big Fat Greek Life: "Greek Easter" (2003)
- Everybody Hates Chris: "Everybody Hates Easter" (2008)
- Letterkenny: "Super Hard Easter" (2016)
- Stuck in the Middle: "Stuck in the Diaz Easter" (2017)
- Black-ish: "North Star" (2018)
- Superstore:
  - "Easter" (2019)
  - "California (Part 1)" (2020)
- Brooklyn Nine-Nine: "Valloweaster" (2020)
- Modern Family: "I'm Going to Miss This" (2020)
- Beef House: "Army Buddy Brad" (2020)
- The Conners: "Text Thread and the Marital Bed" (2023)
- Tyler Perry's House of Payne: "A Payne Family Portrait" (2026)
- Ted: "Susan Is the New Black" (2026)

== Animated sitcoms ==
- The Simpsons:
  - "Simpsons Bible Stories" (1999)
  - "The Last of the Red Hat Mamas" (2005)
  - "Dark Knight Court" (2013)
- Baby Blues: "The Bad Family" (2002)
- South Park:
  - "Fantastic Easter Special" (2007)
  - "Margaritaville" (2009)
  - "Jewpacabra" (2012)
- Family Guy: "Family Goy" (2009)
- American Dad!: "Daesong Heavy Industries" & "Daesong Heavy Industries II: Return to Innocence" (2016)
- Bob's Burgers: "Eggs for Days" (2017)
- Bless the Harts: "Easter's 11" (2021)
- Mulligan: "The Egg Hunt" (2023)
- Rick and Morty: "The Last Temptation of Jerry" (2025)

== Specials ==
- Here Comes Peter Cottontail (1971/ABC)
- Easter Is (1974)
- It's the Easter Beagle, Charlie Brown (1974, CBS)
- The First Easter Rabbit (1976, NBC)
- Bugs Bunny's Easter Special (1977)
- The Easter Bunny Is Comin' to Town (1977, ABC)
- Jesus of Nazareth (1977)
- Perry Como's Easter by the Sea (1978)
- Pat Boone and Family: Easter Special (1979)
- Daffy Duck's Easter Show (1980)
- Easter Fever (1980)
- The Berenstain Bears' Easter Surprise (1981, NBC)
- A Family Circus Easter (1982/NBC)
- Perry Como's Easter in Guadalajara (1982)
- The Fat Albert Easter Special (1982/CBS)
- An Easter Story (Showtime) (1983)
- Peter and the Magic Egg (1983)
- Bob's Easter Full House (1985)
- The Tale of the Bunny Picnic (1986)
- A Chucklewood Easter (1987)
- Andy Williams and the NBC Kids: Easter in Rome (1987)
- The Easter Egg (1987)
- The Magic Boy’s Easter (1989)
- Easter Egg Mornin' (1991)
- A Claymation Easter (1992, CBS)
- Tiny Toon Spring Break (1994, Fox Kids)
- Yogi the Easter Bear (1994)
- The Easter Chipmunk (1995)
- Thumpkin and the Easter Bunnies (1996)
- P.J. Funnybunny: A Very Cool Easter (1997)
- Ice Age: The Great Egg-Scapade (2016, FOX)
- The Last Hangover aka Especial de Natal: Se Beber, Não Ceie (2018)
- Easter Land (2019)
- Easterland 2 (2020)
- Hodge Saves Easter (2020)

== See also ==
- List of films set around Easter
- List of United States Christmas television episodes
- List of United States Christmas television specials
- List of Christmas television specials
- List of Halloween television specials
- List of St. Patrick's Day television specials
- List of Thanksgiving television specials
- List of Valentine's Day television specials
- List of Independence Day television specials
