= Nilus the Sandman =

Canadian television series

- Genre: Fantasy; Children
- Created by: Michael Fawkes
- Written by: Michael Mercer
- Directed by: Chris Delaney
- Voices of: Long John Baldry; Ian James Corlett; Don Francks; Cathy Weseluck
- Theme music composer: Rick Fox
- Composer: Rick Fox
- Country of origin: Canada
- Original language: English
- No. of seasons: 2
- No. of episodes: 26

Production
- Executive producers: Chris Delaney; Arnie Zipursky
- Producers: Chris Delaney; Arnie Zipursky; Julie Stall
- Running time: 25 minutes
- Production companies: Cambium Film & Video Productions; Delaney & Friends Cartoon Productions

Original release
- Network: Family Channel
- Release: 5 October 1996 – 25 October 1998

Related
- Nilus the Sandman: The Boy Who Dreamed Christmas (1991); Nilus the Sandman: Monsters in the Closet (1994); Nilus the Sandman: The First Day (1995)

Nilus the Sandman is a Canadian part-animated and part-live-action television series that originally aired on The Family Channel from 5 October 1996 to 25 October 1998. The series was preceded by three Nilus the Sandman television specials broadcast between 1991 and 1995 on CTV. The series was produced by Cambium Film & Video Productions and Delaney & Friends Cartoon Productions, and distributed by The Family Channel and Western International Communications (WIC).

The show features the Sandman, named Nilus (voiced by Long John Baldry), who helps children and teenagers through their dreams while they are asleep, with the dream stories being animated. The scenes at the beginning and the end of each episode are shot in live action in Vancouver, British Columbia. The show has a total of 26 episodes which aired over two seasons.

The show later aired on A Channel in Alberta and MTN in Manitoba.

== Synopsis ==
Nilus the Sandman helps children with day-to-day difficulties through helping them achieve happier dreams. While the children sleep he sneaks in and takes sand out of his pocket and flicks it into the air, which leads the children into their animated dream. The children are first surprised with their new animated avatar-self and start a journey discovering Nilus's friendly acquaintances – a talking clam and a camel – who help him during his mission.

== Cast and characters ==
- Long John Baldry as Nilus the Sandman
- Ian James Corlett as Blue the Camel
- Cathy Weseluck as Pearl the Talking Clam
- Don Francks as The Boogie Man
- Holly Cole as Venus
- Michael Fawkes as Frantic

== Precursor television specials ==
Prior to the series' premiere, three Nilus the Sandman television specials were broadcast on CTV:

- Nilus the Sandman: The Boy Who Dreamed Christmas is a Christmas special which premiered on 1 December 1991.
- Nilus the Sandman: Monsters in the Closet is a Halloween special which premiered on 27 October 1994.
- Nilus the Sandman: The First Day is a back-to-school special which premiered on 3 September 1995.

== Episodes ==
The series aired a total of 26 episodes over two seasons between 1996 and 1998.

=== Season 1 (1996–97) ===
No. overall	No. in series	Title	Original release date
1	1	"Carrotio"	5 October 1996
Nilus and a boy named Gus (Rhys Huber) who hates vegetables meet an opera-singing carrot named Carrotio.
2	2	"Rock-a-Bye Baby"	12 October 1996
A boy named Todd (John Kirkconnell) finds it difficult to adjust to the fact that he has a new baby sister.
3	3	"Pirates of Pi"	19 October 1996
Bored to tears, a girl named Rhonda (Jennifer Martin) falls asleep in math class and wakes up in Nilus the Sandman's dream world, awash on a sea of numbers.
4	4	"The Bully"	1 November 1996
A boy named Kevin Taylor (Zachary Carlin) is bullied at school and likes to read comic books about superheroes. He wishes that he was a superhero so that he would no longer be bullied and, while dreaming, he is given a chance to become one, thanks to Nilus and his friend Atlas.
5	5	"King of the Universe"	8 November 1996
A boy named Jack (Tyler Wozny) doesn't need his sister's help with his homework, even though he is failing school badly. In fact he doesn't need anyone's help. He just wants everyone to leave him alone to play with his beloved dinosaurs.
6	6	"Cupid's Bow"	15 November 1996
A Girl named Kate (Kelli Stewart) isn't really ready to date yet, but an upcoming Valentine's dance may force her into it. When two boys invite her to the party, she is in a quandary.
7	7	"Chaos Rules"	22 November 1996
A boy named Spencer (Massimo Cusano) has big dreams of making the winning hit in a World Series baseball championship. What he doesn't dream about is chores. Then he has a dream about a world with no more orders and no more rules.
8	8	"The Day of Living Dangerously"	29 November 1996
A boy named Daredevil Danny (Kyle Labine) has been challenged to risk his neck on another hair-raising bike stunt, and he never refuses a dare. When he crashes his bike and is knocked out cold, Nilus appears and offers the boy his ultimate dream of adventure.
9	9	"Game Over"	6 December 1996
A boy named Norman "Fingers" Callaghan (Sean Amsing) is obsessed with a video game. Trying to beat "Karn, the Mindmaster" has become his whole world, even if he puts his friendships, hobbies and school grades at risk for it.
10	10	"About Face"	13 December 1996
A girl named Amy Campbell (Brittney Irvin) loves baseball, but is increasingly fascinated by her big sister Sandra with her gang of friends, who seem to live for the latest fashions and makeup. When she falls asleep, Nilus takes her on an adventure in beauty land.
11	11	"The Music Lesson"	24 January 1997
A girl named Cynthia (Frances You) is fed up. She just cannot play the latest piece of cello music her teacher (Alec Willows) has given her, no matter how hard she practices. When Nilus brings to life her bow and music stand, Cynthia begins to learn about patience.
12	12	"Next Stop"	2 February 1997
A boy named Brian (Cody Serpa) and his family is moving to another city. Brian's parents want him to give away some of his old toys, and when Brian meets Nilus and a troupe of toys come alive, he learns how to move forward.
13	13	"Not a Happy Camper"	7 February 1997
A girl named Jenny (Rebecca Philpott) is "not a happy camper." Stuck in the middle of nowhere, with girls she has never met before, Jenny isn't fitting in. Can Nilus teach her to give this situation another chance?

=== Season 2 (1998) ===
No. overall	No. in series	Title	Original release date
14	1	"If Dreams Die"	6 September 1998
Nilus has to save Dreamland after Frantic steals Nilus's Dream Dust Hourglass. Meanwhile, Nilus accompanies a girl named Bonnie who learns about how misunderstandings can cause conflict.
15	2	"Shop Til You Drop"	7 September 1998
Nilus accompanies a girl named Amy who loves to shop and who dreams that she is going on a shopping spree, but her shopping eventually goes too far.
16	3	"Otherwise"	13 September 1998
Nilus accompanies a boy named David who frequently breaks promises and brags about himself. David's claims about himself are tested when he is forced to battle a monster.
17	4	"Speak Up"	14 September 1998
Nilus accompanies a girl named Jennie who cares deeply about the environment, but is too shy to speak out about it.
18	5	"Loose Change"	20 September 1998
Nilus accompanies a boy named Norm who finds it difficult to keep money and frequently borrows money from his friends. In his dream, Norm learns about the negative effects of greed on friendship.
19	6	"The Joker"	21 September 1998
Nilus accompanies a boy named Willie, the school trickster, who often has trouble distinguishing between humorous and hurtful. In his dream, Willie learns to respect others.
20	7	"Weedworld"	27 September 1998
Flowers and weeds must work together to find water.
21	8	"The Dream Doors"	28 September 1998
Nilus accompanies a girl named Bonnie who lacks confidence in herself.
22	9	"Someone Just Like Me"	4 October 1998
When a soccer ball bounces off a wall, it temporarily knocks Danny out of reality and into a dream world.
23	10	"House of Horrors"	5 October 1998
David is locked in a haunted house with ghosts and ghouls, and is told that the only way out is to find a mysterious glove.
24	11	"Achy Breaky Bod"	11 October 1998
There's a loud, unruly guitar-playing virus running loose in Farah's body that needs to be treated.
25	12	"The Wizard Is Ill"	12 October 1998
It's Poison Pincher Crab Country, and if you ain't a crab, you ain't welcome.
26	13	"Guilty"	25 October 1998
Lan's dream takes him into a George Orwell-style factory.
