= List of holiday horror films =

Horror subgenre set during a holiday

Holiday-themed horror films or holiday horror are a subgenre of horror films set during holidays. Holiday horror films can be presented in short or long formats, and typically utilize common themes, images, and motifs from the holidays during which they are set, often as methods by which the villain may murder their victims. The genre has its own subgenres, such as Christmas horror.

Film scholars Chris Vander Kaay and Kathleen Fernandez-Vander Kaay explain the subgenre as such:

The expression 'adding insult to injury' is an excellent encapsulation of the motivation behind the horror movie obsession with holidays (aside from the obvious desire to brand a killer with a theme and costume that can be revisited many times within a lucrative film franchise). The holiday is a place for happiness and family... The horror movie loves nothing more than irony (except perhaps a good death scene), and there is very little more ironic than the fear and isolation of a horror movie taking place right in the middle of the festivities.

== List of films ==
The following is a list of holiday horror films that depict or are set during a holiday or holiday season.

=== 1900s ===
Year	Film	Country	Holiday(s)	Notes	Ref.
1901	Scrooge, or, Marley's Ghost	United Kingdom	Christmas		

=== 1910s ===
Year	Film	Country	Holiday(s)	Notes	Ref.
1916	The Right to Be Happy	United States	Christmas		

=== 1920s ===
Year	Film	Country	Holiday(s)	Notes	Ref.
1921	The Phantom Carriage	Sweden	New Year's Eve/New Year	Based on the book Thy Soul Shall Bear Witness!	
1922	Häxan	Denmark-Sweden	Walpurgis Night / May Day		
1922	The Headless Horseman	United States	Halloween		
1923	A Midsummer Night's Scream	United States	Midsummer	Short film	

=== 1930s ===
Year	Film	Country	Holiday(s)	Notes	Ref.
1931	Dracula	United States	Walpurgis Night/May Day		
1933	Mystery of the Wax Museum	United States	New Year's Eve/New Year		
1936	The Devil-Doll	United States	Christmas		

=== 1940s ===
Year	Film	Country	Holiday(s)	Notes	Ref.
1944	Christmas Holiday	United States	Christmas		
1944	The Curse of the Cat People	United States	Christmas		
1945	Dead of Night	United Kingdom	Christmas	Anthology film	

=== 1950s ===
Year	Film	Country	Holiday(s)	Notes	Ref.
1955	The Night of the Hunter	United States	Christmas		
1958	The Phantom Carriage	Sweden	New Year's Eve/New Year	Remake of the 1921 film	

=== 1960s ===
Year	Film	Country	Holiday(s)	Notes	Ref.
1960	Macario	Mexico	Dia de Muertos		
1960	Psycho	United States	Christmas		
1961	Blast of Silence	United States	Christmas		
1964	Castle of Blood	Italy / France	All Soul's Eve		
1964	At Midnight I'll Take Your Soul	Brazil	Good Friday		
1968	Seeds of Sin	United States	Christmas		

=== 1970s ===
Year	Film	Country	Holiday(s)	Notes	Ref.
1970	La Noche de Walpurgis	Spain	Walpurgis Night / May Day		
1971	The Fifth Cord	Italy	New Year's Eve/New Year		
1971	Web of the Spider	Italy/ France/ Germany	All Soul's Eve		
1972	Whoever Slew Auntie Roo?	United Kingdom	Christmas		
1972	Tales from the Crypt	United Kingdom	Christmas, Valentine	Anthology film	
1972	Frogs	United States	Independence Day		
1972	Home for the Holidays	United States	Christmas	Television film	
1972	Silent Night, Bloody Night	United States	Christmas		
1973	The Wicker Man	United Kingdom	Walpurgis Night / May Day		
1973	El Retorno de Walpurgis	Spain	Walpurgis Night / May Day		
1973	The Legend of Hell House	United Kingdom	Christmas		
1974	Persecution	United Kingdom	Christmas		
1974	Black Christmas	Canada	Christmas		
1974	The Bloody Exorcism of Coffin Joe	Brazil	Christmas		
1975	The Sky Is Falling	Spanish	Easter		
1975	Jaws	United States	Independence Day		
1975	Night Train Murders	Italy	Christmas		
1975	Deep Red	Italy	Christmas		
1976	God Told Me To	United States	Saint Patrick's Day		
1976	The Clown Murders	Canada	Halloween		
1976	To the Devil a Daughter	United Kingdom	Halloween		
1977	The Child	United States	Halloween		
1977	Rabid	Canada	Christmas		
1978	Mardi Gras Massacre	United States	Mardi Gras		
1978	Halloween	United States	Halloween		
1979	World Market of Sex	Brazil	Christmas		

=== 1980s ===
Year	Film	Country	Holiday(s)	Notes	Ref.
1980	Terror Train	United States	New Year's Eve/New Year		
1980	To All a Goodnight	United States	Christmas		
1980	Christmas Evil	United States	Christmas		
1980	Maniac	United States	Christmas		
1980	New Year's Evil	United States	New Year's Eve/New Year		
1980	Ms .45	United States	Halloween		
1981	My Bloody Valentine	Canada	Valentine's Day	Also takes place during Friday the 13th	
1981	Halloween II	United States	Halloween		
1981	Frozen Scream	United States	Halloween		
1981	Home Sweet Home	United States	Thanksgiving		
1981	Ghostkeeper	Canada	New Year's Eve/New Year		
1981	The Hand	United States	Christmas		
1982	Humongous	Canada	Labor Day		
1982	Creepshow	United States	Father's Day / Halloween	Anthology film	
1982	The Dorm That Dripped Blood	United States	Christmas		
1982	Halloween III: Season of the Witch	United States	Halloween		
1982	Trick or Treats	United States	Halloween		
1982	Wacko	United States	Halloween		
1982	Hospital Massacre	United States	Valentine's Day		
1983	Bloodbeat	United States/France	Christmas		
1983	The Being	United States	Easter		
1984	Don't Open till Christmas	United Kingdom	Christmas		
1984	Gremlins	United States	Christmas		
1984	Silent Night, Deadly Night	United States	Christmas		
1984	Night of the Comet	United States	Christmas		
1984	Tales of the Third Dimension	United States	Christmas	Anthology film	
1984	Sole Survivor	United States	Christmas		
1985	Trancers	United States	Christmas		
1985	The Oracle	United States	Christmas/ New Year		
1985	The Return of the Living Dead	United States	Independence Day		
1985	Silver Bullet	United States	Independence Day		
1985	The Midnight Hour	United States	Halloween	Television film	
1985	Cemetery of Terror	Mexico	Halloween		
1986	April Fool's Day	United States	April Fools		
1986	Killer Party	Canada/United States	April Fools		
1986	Slaughter High	United Kingdom/United States	April Fools		
1986	Trick or Treat	United States	Halloween		
1986	Deadly Friend	United States	Halloween/ Thanksgiving		
1987	Silent Night, Deadly Night Part 2	United States	Christmas		
1987	Outback Vampires	Australia	Christmas	Television film	
1987	Night Visitors	United States	Christmas	Direct-to-video	
1987	Blood Rage	United States	Thanksgiving		
1987	Bloody New Year's Eve/New Year	United Kingdom	New Year's Eve/New Year's		
1987	Dead of Winter	United States	New Year's Eve/ New Year		
1988	The Brain	Canada	Christmas		
1988	Trapped Alive	America	Christmas	Direct-to-video	
1988	Lady in White	United States	Halloween, Christmas		
1988	Critters 2: The Main Course	United States	Easter		
1988	Maniac Cop	United States	Saint Patrick's Day		
1988	Night of the Demons	United States	Halloween		
1988	Nightmare Beach	United States/Italy	Easter		
1988	Halloween 4: The Return of Michael Myers	United States	Halloween		
1988	Deadly Dreams	United States	Christmas		
1988	Faceless	France	Christmas		
1988	Iced	United States	New Year's Eve/New Year		
1989	3615 code Père Noël	France	Christmas		
1989	Halloween 5: The Revenge of Michael Myers	United States	Halloween		
1989	Communion	United States	Boxing Day		
1989	Elves	United States	Christmas		
1989	I, Madman	United States	Christmas		
1989	Silent Night, Deadly Night 3: Better Watch Out!	United States	Christmas	Direct-to-video	
1989	Ghostbusters II	United States	Christmas, New Year's Eve/ New Year		

=== 1990s ===
Year	Film	Country	Holiday(s)	Notes	Ref.
1990	Graveyard Shift	United States	Independence Day		
1990	Maniac Cop 2	United States	Christmas	Although it is a direct sequel that takes place immediately after the events of Maniac Cop (which takes place around St. Patrick's Day), Maniac Cop 2 clearly takes place at Christmastime, which creates a significant continuity error throughout the two films.	
1990	Silent Night, Deadly Night 4: Initiation	United States	Christmas	Direct-to-video	
1990	Hardware	United Kingdom	Christmas		
1991	The Boneyard	United States	Thanksgiving	Direct-to-video	
1991	Silent Night, Deadly Night 5: The Toy Maker	United States	Christmas	Direct-to-video	
1991	Omen IV: The Awakening	United States/Canada	Christmas	Television film	
1991	Campfire Tales	United States	Christmas	Anthology film	
1992	Stepfather III	United States	Easter, Father's Day	Television film	
1992	Cronos	Mexico	Christmas/ New Year		
1993	Amityville: A New Generation	United States	Thanksgiving	Direct-to-video	
1993	The Nightmare Before Christmas	United States	Halloween, Christmas		
1994	Night of the Demons 2	United States	Halloween		
1994	Leprechaun 2	United States	Saint Patrick's Day	The only installment in the Leprechaun franchise to be set around St. Patrick's Day	
1995	The Granny	United States	Thanksgiving	Direct-to-video	
1995	The Day of the Beast	Spain/Italy	Christmas		
1995	Halloween: The Curse of Michael Myers	United States	Halloween		
1995	Jack-O	United States	Halloween		
1996	Uncle Sam	United States	Independence Day	Direct-to-video	
1996	Santa Claws	United States	Christmas		
1996	Little Witches	United States	Easter		
1997	Intensity	United States	Thanksgiving	Television film	
1997	Night of the Demons 3	United States	Halloween		
1997	I Know What You Did Last Summer	United States	Independence Day		
1998	Alien Abduction: Incident in Lake County	United States	Thanksgiving	Television film	
1998	Halloween H20: 20 Years Later	United States	Halloween		
1998	The Minion	United States/ Canada	Christmas		
1999	Zombie! vs. Mardi Gras	United States	Mardi Gras	Direct-to-video	
1999	Lovers Lane	United States	Valentine's Day	Direct-to-video	
1999	End of Days	United States	New Year's Eve/New Year		
1999	Resurrection	United States	Easter		
1999	Witchouse	United States	Walpurgis Night / May Day	Direct-to-video	
1999	Memorial Day	United States	Memorial Day	Direct-to-video	

=== 2000s ===
Year	Film	Country	Holiday(s)	Notes	Ref.
2000	Bless the Child	United States	Christmas		
2000	Jack Frost 2: Revenge of the Mutant Killer Snowman	United States	Christmas	Direct-to-video	
2000	Ginger Snaps	Canada	Halloween		
2001	The Christmas Season Massacre	United States	Christmas	Direct-to-video	
2001	Valentine	United States, Canada, Australia	Valentine's Day		
2002	Halloween: Resurrection	United States	Halloween		
2002	The Mothman Prophecies	United States	Christmas		
2003	Dead End	United States	Christmas		
2003	House of 1000 corpses	United States	Halloween		
2003	Midsommer	Denmark	Midsummer		
2003	Shredder	United States	Christmas	Direct-to-video	
2003	Zero Day	United States	Walpurgis Night / May Day		
2004	Hellbent	United States	Halloween		
2004	Satan's Little Helper	United States	Halloween		
2005	All Souls Day	United States	Dia de Muertos		
2005	Boogeyman	Germany/United States/New Zealand	Thanksgiving		
2005	The Gingerdead Man	United States	Christmas		
2005	Santa's Slay	United States	Christmas		
2006	The Wicker Man	United States	Walpurgis Night / May Day		
2006	Easter Bunny, Kill! Kill!	United States	Easter		
2006	Halloween Night	United States	Halloween	Direct-to-video	
2006	Black Christmas	United States	Christmas	Remake of the 1974 film	
2006	Séance	United States	Thanksgiving		
2007	El Muerto	United States	Dia de Muertos		
2007	April Fools	United States	April Fools	Direct-to-video	
2007	Solstice	United States	Midsummer	Remake of Midsommer	
2007	Grindhouse	United States	Thanksgiving	Anthology film, one of the fake movie trailers shown is for the film Thanksgiving, a slash horror film taking place on the Thanksgiving holiday	
2007	Halloween	United States	Halloween	Remake of the 1978 film	
2007	Wind Chill	United States	Christmas		
2007	La leyenda de la Nahuala	Mexico	Dia de Muertos		
2007	Trick 'r Treat	United States	Halloween	Anthology film	
2007	Inside	France	Christmas		
2008	April Fool's Day	United States	April Fools	Remake of the 1986 film	
2008	Gingerdead Man 2: Passion of the Crust	United States	Christmas		
2008	Treevenge	Canada	Christmas	Short film	
2008	Pontypool	Canada	Valentine		
2008	The Children	United Kingdom	Christmas, New Year's Eve/New Year		
2008	ThanksKilling	United States	Thanksgiving		
2009	My Bloody Valentine	United States	Valentine's Day	Remake of the 1981 film	
2009	Dead Snow	Norway	Easter		
2009	Earth Day	United States	4/20, Earth Day		
2009	Halloween II	United States	Halloween	Sequel to the 2007 remake	
2009	Deadly Little Christmas	United States	Christmas	Direct-to-video	
2009	Silent Night, Zombie Night	United States	Christmas		

=== 2010s ===
Year	Film	Country	Holiday(s)	Notes	Ref.
2010	Atrocious	Spain	Easter		
2010	Rare Exports: A Christmas Tale	Finland	Christmas		
2010	Easter Bunny Bloodbath	Canada	Easter		
2010	Sint	The Netherlands	St. Nicholas' Day		
2011	Father's Day	United States	Father's Day		
2011	The Wicker Tree	United Kingdom	Walpurgis Night / May Day		
2011	The Melancholy Fantastic	United States	Christmas	Re-released in 2016 as Doll in the Dark	
2011	Gingerdead Man 3: Saturday Night Cleaver	United States	Christmas	Direct-to-video	
2011	Livid	France	Halloween		
2012	V/H/S	United States	Halloween	Anthology film	
2012	Red Clover	United States	Saint Patrick's Day	Made for television	
2012	Silent Night	United States	Christmas	Loose remake of Silent Night, Deadly Night (1984)	
2012	Wrong Turn 5: Bloodlines	United States	Halloween	Direct-to-video	
2013	Cinco de Mayo	United States	Cinco de Mayo		
2013	All Hallows' Eve	United States	Halloween	Direct-to-video anthology film	
2013	Christmas Cruelty!	Norway	Christmas		
2013	Antisocial	Canada	New Year's Eve/New Year		
2013	Gingerdead Man vs. Evil Bong	United States	Christmas		
2013	Silent Night, Bloody Night: The Homecoming	United Kingdom	Christmas	Remake of the 1972 American film Silent Night, Bloody Night	
2014	Among the Living	France	Halloween		
2014	México Bárbaro	Mexico	Dia de Muertos	Anthology film	
2014	Beaster Day: Here Comes Peter Cottonhell	United States	Easter		
2014	Kristy	United States	Thanksgiving		
2015	Night of the Living Deb	United States	Independence Day		
2015	Knock Knock	United States	Father's Day		
2015	All Hallows' Eve 2	United States	Halloween	Direct-to-video anthology film	
2015	Paranormal Activity: The Ghost Dimension	United States	Christmas		
2015	All Through the House	United States	Christmas		
2015	Noc Walpurgi	Poland	Walpurgis Night / May Day		
2015	A Christmas Horror Story	United States	Christmas	Anthology film	
2015	Krampus	United States	Christmas		
2015	Krampus: The Reckoning	United States	Christmas	Direct-to-video	
2015	Red Christmas	Australia	Christmas		
2015	Tales of Halloween	United States	Halloween	Anthology film	
2015	Muck	United States	Saint Patrick's Day		
2015	Rage: Midsummer's Eve	Finland	Midsummer		
2016	Bloody Bobby	United States	Halloween		
2016	Arbor Demon	United States	Arbor Day		
2016	Presidents Day	United States	Presidents Day		
2016	Krampus Unleashed	United States	Christmas	Direct-to-video	
2016	Holidays	United States	Valentine, Saint Patrick's Day, Easter, Mother's Day, Father's Day, Halloween, Christmas, New Year's Eve/New Year	Anthology film	
2016	Better Watch Out	Australia/United States	Christmas		
2016	31	United States	Halloween		
2016	Terrifier	United States	Halloween		
2016	The Purge: Election Year	United States	Election Day		
2017	Groundhog	United States	Candlemas / Groundhog Day		
2017	The Recall	Canada	Labor Day		
2017	It	United States	Independence Day		
2017	Anna and the Apocalypse	United Kingdom/United States	Christmas		
2017	Truth or Dare	United States	Halloween		
2017	10/31	United States	Halloween	Anthology film	
2017	Mercy Christmas	United States	Christmas		
2017	Mother Krampus	United States	Christmas		
2017	Once Upon a Time at Christmas	United Kingdom	Christmas		
2018	4/20 Massacre	United States	4/20		
2018	Rottentail	United States	Easter		
2018	Halloween	United States	Halloween		
2018	Mother Krampus 2	United States	Christmas		
2018	Await Further Instructions	United Kingdom	Christmas		
2018	New Year, New You	United States	New Year's Eve/New Year		
2018	Santa Jaws	United States	Christmas		
2018	Secret Santa	Canada	Christmas		
2019	Escape Room	United States	Thanksgiving		
2019	Midsommar	United States	Midsummer		
2019	Fractured	United States	Thanksgiving		
2019	Black Christmas	United States	Christmas	Remake of the 1974 film	
2019	Scary Stories to Tell in the Dark	United States/Canada	Halloween		
2019	Trick	United States	Halloween		
2019	Deathcember	Germany	Christmas	Anthology film	
2019	Down	United States	Valentine, President's Day		
2019	Holiday Hell	United States	Valentine, Christmas, Hanukkah	Anthology film	
2019	Hanukkah	United States	Hanukkah		
2019	Ring Ring	United States	Halloween		

=== 2020s ===
Year	Film	Country	Holiday(s)	Notes	Ref.
2020	Black Pumpkin	United States	Halloween		
2020	Hubie Halloween	United States	Halloween		
2020	A Babysitter's Guide to Monster Hunting	United States	Halloween		
2020	Blood Pi	United States	Halloween		
2020	The Last Thanksgiving	United States	Thanksgiving		
2020	Toys of Terror	United States	Christmas		
2020	Happy Horror Days	United States	Valentine, Saint Patrick's Day, Easter, Independence Day, Labor Day, Halloween, Thanksgiving, Hanukkah, Christmas, New Year's Eve/New Year's	Anthology film	
2020	It Cuts Deep	United States	Christmas		
2021	Red Snow	United States	Christmas		
2021	St. Patrick's Day	United States	Saint Patrick's Day		
2021	Spiral	United States	Independence Day		
2021	Halloween Kills	United States	Halloween		
2022	Nian	United States	Chinese New Year	Short film	
2022	The Blackening	United States	Juneteenth		
2022	Terrifier 2	United States	Halloween		
2022	Halloween Ends	United States	Halloween		
2022	The Mean One	United States	Christmas		
2022	The Leech	United States	Christmas		
2023	Scream VI	United States	Halloween		
2023	Dark Harvest	United States	Halloween		
2023	Thanksgiving	United States	Thanksgiving		
2023	It's a Wonderful Knife	United States	Christmas		
2023	All Hallows' Eve: Trickster	United States	Halloween	Direct-to-video anthology film	
2023	Totally Killer	United States	Halloween		
2023	Late Night with the Devil	United States/ Australia	Halloween		
2024	Easter Evil	United States	Easter		
2024	Easter Bloody Easter	United States	Easter		
2024	Haunt Season	United States	Halloween		
2024	The Substance	United States/ United Kingdom/ France	New Year		
2024	Y2K	United States	New Year		
2024	Terrifier 3	United States	Christmas		
2024	A Very Flattened Christmas	United States	Christmas		
2024	Carnage for Christmas	Australia	Christmas	Notable for being edited by Vera Drew	
2024	All Hallows' Eve: Inferno	United States	Halloween	Direct-to-video anthology film	
2025	Heart Eyes	United States	Valentine's Day		
2025	V/H/S/Halloween	United States	Halloween	Anthology film	
2025	Silent Night, Deadly Night	United States	Christmas	Remake of the 1984 film by the same title	

== See also ==
- Into the Dark, a holiday horror anthology TV series
- Lists of films set around holidays
  - List of films set around Christmas
  - List of films set around Easter
  - List of films set around Father's Day
  - List of films set around Halloween
  - List of films set around May Day
  - List of films set around Mother's Day
  - List of films set around New Year
  - List of films set around St. Patrick's Day
  - List of films set around Thanksgiving
  - List of films set around Valentine's Day
- Christmas horror

== Works cited ==
- Jones, Alan-Bertaneisson (2010). Fright Xmas. AuthorHouseUK. ISBN 9781452061993.
- Muir, John Kenneth (2012). Horror Films of the 1980s. Vol. 1. Jefferson, N.C.: McFarland. ISBN 9780786472987. OCLC 840902442.
- Vander Kaay, Chris; Fernandez-Vander Kaay, Kathleen (2016). Horror Films by Subgenre: A Viewer's Guide. McFarland. ISBN 9781476622835.
