= Lists of films set around holidays =

Lists of films set around holidays includes:

- List of holiday horror films
- List of films set around Christmas
- List of films set around Easter
- List of films set around Father's Day
- List of films set around Halloween
- List of films set around May Day
- List of films set around Mother's Day
- List of films set around New Year
- List of films set around St. Patrick's Day
- List of films set around Thanksgiving
- List of films set around Valentine's Day
