= Silent Night, Bloody Night 2: Revival =

2015 film by Dustin Ferguson

- Directed by: Dustin Ferguson
- Written by: John Klyza
- Produced by: John Atlyn
- Starring: Jennifer Runyon; Julia Farrell; Jeff Dylan Graham; Jared Allen
- Release date: 15 March 2015

Silent Night, Bloody Night 2: Revival is a 2015 holiday horror film, a sequel to the 1972 film Silent Night, Bloody Night. The film is a direct sequel and continues the story of the original 40 years later.

== Plot ==
Following the death of a family member siblings James and Angelica Zacherly travel to the small town of East Willard on Christmas Eve to pay their respects. There they learn of the legend of Black Peter, Santa Claus' vengeful brother. However, when they find the lost journal of a man named Jeffrey Butler, they discover that the town has its own sordid history, one more rooted in reality.

== Cast ==
- Julia Farrell as Angelica Zacherly
- Luc Bernier as James Zacherly
- Jennifer Runyon as Carol Brickman
- Pete Lipins as Humphrey Brickman
- Jennii Caroline as Holly Brickman
- Jared Allen as The Shape
- Jeanne Kern as Doris
- Jeff Dylan Graham as Max

== Reception ==
Matt Donato of /Film gave the film a negative review, feeling that the film is a forced sequel, he described it as "heartless, unambitious and visually unappealing". He also criticised it for taking inspiration from Silent Night, Deadly Night 2 by replaying footage from the first film extensively in flashbacks. He summed up his review by stating that the film gives "low-budget" a bad name. Film School Rejects Rob Hunter also gave it a negative review, he expressed that the most interesting parts of the film was the reused footage from the original film. Brian Collins of Birth.Movies.Death was more positive, stating that it was a bold choice of the director to make his film a direct sequel to the original, which share no cast or crew members with each other.

== Sequel ==
A sequel, titled Silent Night, Bloody Night 3: Descent, was released on December 25, 2024.

== See also ==
- Silent Night, Bloody Night: The Homecoming, remake of the original film
