= Rabbit Academy: Mission Eggpossible =

- Theatrical release poster
- Directed by: Ute von Münchow-Pohl
- Written by: Katja Grübel; Dagmar Rehbinder
- Based on: Die Häschenschule by Albert Sixtus
- Produced by: Dirk Beinhold; Sebastian Runschke; Valentin Greulich; Tobias Weingärtner
- Edited by: Ute von Münchow-Pohl; Erik Stappenbeck
- Music by: Alex Komlew
- Production companies: Akkord Film Produktion GmbH; SERU Animation; Arx Anima Animation Studio
- Distributed by: LEONINE Studios (Germany); Constantin Film (Austria)
- Release date: 17 March 2022
- Running time: 76 minutes
- Countries: Germany; Austria
- Language: German

Rabbit Academy: Mission Eggpossible (German: Die Häschenschule: Der große Eierklau) is a 2022 German-Austrian animated adventure comedy film directed by Ute von Münchow-Pohl from a screenplay by Katja Grübel and Dagmar Rehbinder, based on the 1924 German children's novel Die Häschenschule (A Day At Bunny School), written by Albert Sixtus and illustrated by Fritz Koch-Gotha. Sequel of Rabbit School – Guardians of the Golden Egg.

== Plot ==
Max, a city-dwelling rabbit, receives a letter from the Rabbit School informing him of his acceptance into training to become a "mega-rabbit," protectors of other Easter bunnies who ensure the safe delivery of Easter eggs. He clashes with Leo, the leader of a Shockvawe Rabbits, thwarting Leo's revenge on a little bunny girl who accidentally ruined his live stream. Max inadvertently takes Leo's motorcycle and rides it out of the city. Furious, Leo discovers that Max has gained the powers of an Easter Bunny and vows revenge on his online channel.

Max reaches the forest, where he encounters his friend Emmy from Bunny School and their adversary, Ruth along with her sons Ferdinand, Bruno, and Lawrence. Ruth and her sons are determined to steal Easter eggs and claim the role of Easter bunny for themselves. Max and Emmi narrowly escape and arrive at Bunny School. There, Max meets Gerda the hen, who oversees the hens on Chicken Mountain, where they lay eggs destined to become Easter eggs. These are delivered to the rabbits using a specialized egg launcher. Other mega-rabbit candidates include Emmy, Anton, and Luise. Max struggles with training, especially since he hasn't practiced since last Easter.

Meanwhile, Leo arrives in the forest and falls into a trap set by the foxes. He reveals that he was expelled from Bunny School and promises the foxes a chance to become "Easter foxes". Ruth and her sons form an alliance with Leo, though Ferdinand remains skeptical of him. Meanwhile, the Golden Egg begins to darken, an ancient omen signaling an attack on Easter. Without the magic of the Golden Egg, the rabbits lose their special powers. Max's training continues to go poorly, and Anton and Emmy accuse him of selfishness. Leo, now leading the foxes, infiltrates Chicken Mountain to steal eggs. Emmy and Max catch them in the act and, with Madame Hermione's help, drive them away. They discover an ancient mural describing a "mega-power amplifier" that grants collective strength through unshakable trust. However, Chicken Mountain collapses, damaging the egg launcher. The delay in egg delivery could mean the end of Easter.

Angry over the failed heist, Ferdinand overhears Leo telling his girlfriend Sandy that he plans to steal and destroy the eggs live on Easter, with the foxes merely being pawns in his scheme. However, Ferdi's family dismisses his warning. Later, by chance, Ferdi ends up at Bunny School and reveals Leo's plot, a name well-known to Mr. Fritz and Hermione. Despite initial hesitation, the rabbits allow Ferdinand to stay, as he genuinely cares about Easter. Max confesses to Hermina that he stole Leo's motorcycle, believing it to be the reason Leo is targeting the Easter rabbits. Hermione reassures him, explaining that Leon has always been a villain. The next day, Ferdinand and Max work together to repair the egg launcher using Ferdinand's engineering skills.

Wanting to prove himself, Ferdinand sneaks out of Bunny School to disable the traps he and his family previously set for the rabbits. Unintentionally, he gives Leon and the foxes the idea of how to infiltrate Chicken Mountain more easily. The rabbits thwart their attempt, but Emmy is captured. Leo demands the rabbits hand over the eggs by the next day, or the foxes will eat Emmy. Max notices part of a trap on Ferdinand and accuses him of betrayal. Hurt, Ferdinand denies the allegations and leaves Bunny School, saddened by the lack of trust. Reflecting on the situation, Max reconciles with Ferdinand the next morning. Together, they rescue Emmy from the foxes and return to Bunny School. Their joy is short-lived, however, as Leo and the foxes arrive on a drone constructed by Sandy.

Leo, openly betraying the foxes, seizes all the collected eggs and attempts to drop them to shatter them. Max and Ferdinand, aided by Emmi, intercept the eggs and activate the mega-power amplifier, successfully recovering them. The Golden Egg regains its magic, and Max is officially declared a mega-rabbit. Leo, captured by Bruno and Lawrence, is banished from Bunny School grounds. In gratitude, Ferdinand becomes the first Easter fox, much to Ruth's delight. With their powers restored, Max, Emmy, and Ferdinand deliver Easter eggs to the city.

== Voice cast ==
Character	German version	Austrian version
Max	Noah Levi	Markus Freistätter
Emmy	Elise Eikermann	Tanja Raunig
Ferdinand	Dirk Petrick	David Miesmer
Leo	Sebastian Fitzner	unknown
Madame Hermione	Senta Berger	Senta Berger
Mr Fritz	Friedrich von Thun	Friedrich von Thun
Gudrun	Katharina Straßer	Katharina Straßer
Anton	Ben Boxberg	Rafael Haider
Luise	Johanna Klebs	Julia Schranz
Anton	Max Boguth	unknown
Ruth	Jule Böwe	Ulrike Beimpold
Bruno	Monty Arnold	Christoph Kohlbacher
Lawrence	Jannik Endemann	Ferdinand Seebacher
Sandy	Liza Simmerlein	unknown
Ron	Erik Stappenbeck	Susi Stach
Little Rabbit Girl	unknown	unknown
