= Cal Robertson =

American actor (born 1986)

- Born: Calvin Kenneth Robertson; June 10, 1986 (age 39); Minneapolis, Minnesota, U.S.
- Other name: Calvin Kenneth
- Occupations: Actor; director; Cinematographer; Writer
- Years active: 2002–present
- Spouse: Sarah Vanel (m. 2012)
- Website: calrobertson.com

Calvin Kenneth Robertson (born June 10, 1986) is an American actor and cinematographer who is best known for portraying Cal Gabriel in Zero Day, a film about two students who plan out a school shooting.

Robertson was cast in the role of Gabriel when director Ben Coccio scouted for actors in Connecticut. Robertson and co-star Andre Keuck shared Best Actor honors at the 2003 Slamdunk Film Festival. Robertson also has had many roles in television series including The Sopranos and White Collar and directing multiple short films.

== Career ==
27-year-old director Ben Coccio scouted the local high schools looking for two boys to play the roles of the killers in his movie Zero Day. Coccio decided on Calvin Robertson for the lead role in the film, and then convinced Calvin's parents to allow Calvin to star in the movie. Robertson received a Best Actor award, Zero Day, Florida International Film Fest. The New York Times Elvis Mitchell reviewed Zero Day and said, "Mr. Robertson has the willowy blond good looks of a Gap model, and a sullen presence to match."

After his experience as an actor, Robertson pursued opportunities in movies and television. After some minor success, Robertson settled on work behind the camera. Robertson is now an aspiring filmmaker. He has eight films listed on his web site. In 2013, one of his short films (Dog Ghost) was showcased at NewFilmmakers Los Angeles. In 2015, he assisted Eddie Mullins on the film Doomsdays.

== Filmography ==
=== Film ===
Year	Film	Role	Notes
2002	Zero Day	Calvin Gabriel	
2004	King of the Corner	Todd	
2005	Strangers with Candy	Les Tuckles	as Cal Robinson
2006	Love/Death/Cobain	Oli Knox	Short
2006	The Isabel Fish	Sage	Short
2008	The Loneliest Place	The Colleague	Short
2009	Cinderello	Suspect No. 1	Short
2010	The Beginner	Carter	
2010	Otto and the Magical Vacuum Cleaner	Teacher	Short

=== Television ===
Year	TV Series	Role	Notes
2004	The Sopranos	Andrew	Episode: "All Happy Families"
2004	Rescue Me	Clerk	Episode: "Gay"
2005	Stella	Clerk	Episode: "Camping"
2007	Guiding Light	Ziggy	Episode #1.15100
2010	White Collar	Justin Magary	Episode Copycat Caffrey

=== Cinematographer and director ===
Year	Cinematographer	Role	Notes
2011	New Neighbor	Cinematographer	Short, Comedy, Drama
2011	Little Brother	Director, Cinematographer, writer, producer	Short, Drama
2011	Green Arms	Cinematographer	Short, Drama, Mystery
2007	Anecdote	Cinematographer	Short, Drama, Mystery
2012	Two Types of Sexism	Cinematographer	Short, News
2012	Homecoming	Cinematographer	Short, Drama, History
2012	Dog Ghost	Director Writer	Short
2013	Doomsdays	Cinematographer	Drama
2014	Admit One	Cinematographer	Short, Comedy, Romance
2014	The Wild the Child and the Miracle	Director	Short, Drama
2014	Join Us	Director	Short, Drama
2014	Old Gold	Director, writer	Short
2015	Nana	Cinematographer	Short, Mystery
2015	Prism	Writer Director	Feature length
2015	Experiencer	Writer Director	Short
2016	White Magic	Cinematographer	Short, Drama
