= Night of the Living Dead: Resurrection =

- DVD cover
- Directed by: James Plumb
- Produced by: Andrew Jones
- Starring: Sule Rimi; Kathy Saxondale; Lee Bane; Mel Stevens; Sabrina Dickens; Sarah Louise Madison
- Music by: James Morrissey
- Production company: North Bank Entertainment
- Distributed by: Lions Gate Entertainment
- Release date: November 30, 2012
- Running time: 86 minutes
- Country: Wales
- Language: English

Night of the Living Dead: Resurrection is a 2012 zombie horror film directed by James Plumb, based on George A. Romero's Night of the Living Dead.

== Plot ==
The deceased have risen with the instinct to feed on the living as a family is trapped during a zombie apocalypse. Soldiers put the sole female survivor in a "rape van" as the story concludes.

== Cast ==
- Sule Rimi as Ben
- Kathy Saxondale as Karen Cooper
- Lee Bane as Kevin
- Mel Stevens as Mandy
- Richard Goss as Red
- Sabrina Dickens as Bonnie
- Sarah Louise Madison as Eve
- S.J. Evans as Rhodes

== Critical reception ==
PopMatters called the film "plodding, familiar, and tedious." DVD Talk gave it one star and simply said "Skip It."
