= Silent Night, Bloody Night =

1972 American slasher film by Theodore Gershuny

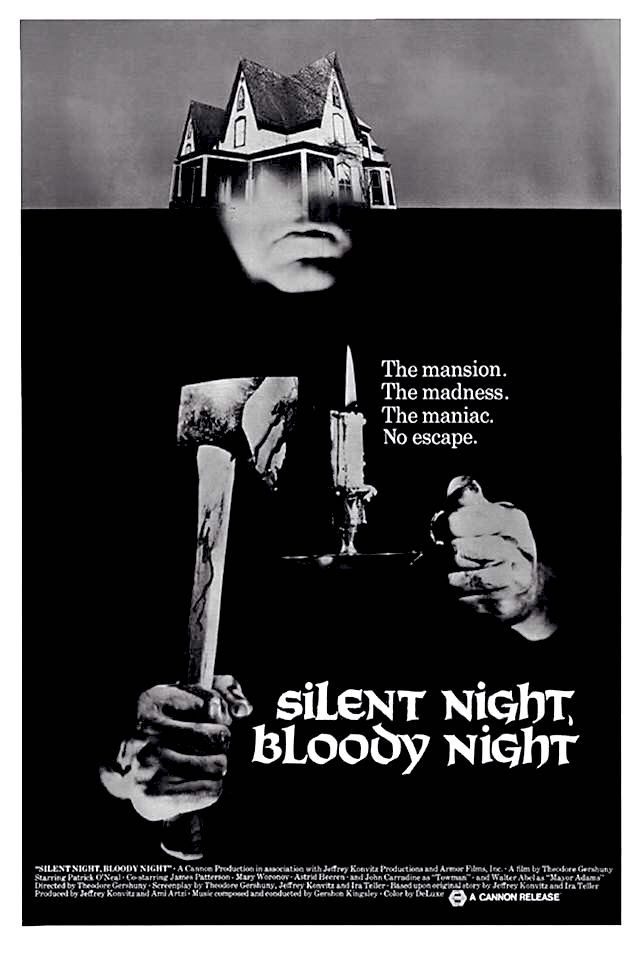
- Theatrical poster
- Directed by: Theodore Gershuny
- Screenplay by: Theodore Gershuny; Jeffrey Konvitz; Ira Teller
- Produced by: Ami Artzi; Jeffrey Konvitz; Lloyd Kaufman; Frank Vitale
- Starring: Patrick O'Neal; James Patterson; Mary Woronov; John Carradine
- Cinematography: Adam Giffard
- Edited by: Tom Kennedy
- Music by: Gershon Kingsley
- Production companies: Armor Films Inc.; Cannon Productions; Jeffrey Konvitz Productions; Zora Investments Associates
- Distributed by: Cannon Films
- Release date: November 15, 1972
- Running time: 83 minutes
- Country: United States
- Language: English
- Budget: $212,000–295,000

Silent Night, Bloody Night is a 1972 American slasher film directed by Theodore Gershuny and starring Patrick O'Neal, Mary Woronov, James Patterson, Astrid Heeren, and John Carradine. The plot follows a series of murders that occur in a small New England town on Christmas Eve after a man inherits a family estate which was once an insane asylum.

Co-written by Jeffrey Konvitz, Silent Night, Bloody Night was filmed in November and December 1970 in Oyster Bay, New York. A number of Warhol superstars appear in the film as extras during the film's flashback sequences, among them Ondine, Candy Darling, and Susan Rothenberg.

Silent Night, Bloody Night was briefly released under the alternative title Night of the Dark Full Moon in November 1972 by Cannon Films, before receiving subsequent releases as Silent Night, Bloody Night and later, Death House. Though attributed to Zora Investments Associates, the film was never registered with the United States Copyright Office and thus fell into the public domain.

While it received little critical notice at the time of its release, it was frequently broadcast on television in the late-1970s during the Christmas season, and has been assessed by modern film critics and writers for its surreal style and atmosphere. It has also been noted as a progenitor of the slasher film genre. In 2015, Boston.com ranked it as one of the scariest films of all time, describing it as a "forgotten classic" and "the movie that birthed the modern slasher flick."

== Plot ==
Silent Night, Bloody Night (full film)

On Christmas Eve 1950, Wilfred Butler dies in a burning accident outside his mansion in East Willard, Massachusetts. The residence is bequeathed to his grandson, Jeffrey. Twenty years later, in 1970, lawyer John Carter arrives in East Willard on Christmas Eve with his assistant and mistress Ingrid, having been charged by Jeffrey to sell the house. Carter meets with the town's leading citizens: Mayor Adams; Sheriff Bill Mason; the mute Charlie Towman, who owns the local newspaper; and Tess Howard, who operates the town's telephone switchboard. They all agree to buy the Butler mansion on behalf of the town for the bargain price of $50,000, which Jeffrey requires to be paid in cash the next day. Carter and Ingrid spend the night at the Butler mansion, but are brutally murdered in bed with an axe by an unseen assailant. After the murders, the killer places a crucifix in Ingrid's hand and proceeds to phone the sheriff, introducing himself as the house's owner and asking him to investigate Carter's disappearance. While talking with Tess, who forwards his call, the killer calls himself "Marianne".

At nightfall, Jeffrey arrives at the mansion to meet with Carter, but finds it locked and empty. He drives to the mayor's home, where he meets Diane, the mayor's daughter. The mayor has gone to the county's bank to obtain the required cash for the payment, so she redirects Jeffrey to the sheriff's office. Simultaneously, the sheriff heads to the mansion, but first stops at Wilfred Butler's disturbed gravesite, where he is beaten to death with a shovel. Failing to locate the sheriff, Jeffrey returns to the mayor's home, where Diane tells him she has received phone calls for her father from someone named "Marianne" who beckons her to the mansion.

Puzzled by the strange events, Jeffrey and Diane decide to drive to the mansion, but stop after they find the sheriff's abandoned car. The two stop by the newspaper office, where they meet Charlie who reveals that he cannot speak due to laryngectomy, but manages to explain to them (in written notes) that Tess has also gone to the mansion. Jeffrey and Charlie go after her while Diane researches the Butler house's history in the archives. Diane manages to piece together the Butlers' story: In 1930, Wilfred's wife died of tuberculosis. In 1933, his 15-year-old daughter Marianne was raped and got pregnant; the son she gave birth to is Jeffrey, who was sent away to California. In 1935, Wilfred converted the mansion into a mental hospital and had Marianne committed. The rest of the story has apparently been redacted.

Tess arrives at the mansion and finds the sheriff's car running outside. In the foyer, she is greeted by the unseen killer, who bludgeons her to death with a candlestick. Jeffrey meanwhile arrives at Tess's house and finds it empty, after which he returns to Diane at the newspaper office. Diane tells Jeffrey that, based on her research, his mother did not die during his birth like he had thought. Jeffrey and Diane depart together to the mansion. En route, they pass Charlie's car, which has been set on fire; moments later, Charlie throws himself at Jeffrey's car and Jeffrey runs him over, killing him. Examining the body, Jeffrey realizes someone has cut Charlie's hands off.

At the mansion, Jeffrey finds his grandfather's diary in the foyer, which reveals he was the one who got Marianne pregnant. The diary recounts how Wilfred grew hostile toward the complacent hospital staff, so during a 1935 Christmas Eve party, he freed the hospital's patients, causing a massacre that resulted in Marianne's death as well. He then ended up faking his death in 1950 and has been living anonymously in a nearby mental hospital ever since before escaping earlier that day after reading from a local newspaper about the Butler mansion being put up for sale. Jeffrey tells Diane that his grandfather/father is still alive, and that the sheriff, Tess, Towman and the mayor were all former inmates Wilfred sought revenge on for the death of Marianne. The mayor arrives at the mansion armed with a rifle, and he and Jeffrey open fire, killing each other. The killer, revealed to be the elderly Wilfred Butler, finally appears, and Diane grabs Jeffrey's gun and shoots him dead.

In the final scene set several months later the following year, Diane takes one last look at the Butler mansion before it is destroyed by a bulldozer crew.

== Cast ==
- Patrick O'Neal as John Carter
- James Patterson as Jeffrey Butler
- Mary Woronov as Diane Adams
- Astrid Heeren as Ingrid
- John Carradine as Charlie Towman
- Walter Abel as Mayor Adams
- Fran Stevens as Tess Howard
- Walter Klavun as Sheriff Bill Mason
- Phillip Bruns as Wilfred Butler (1929)
  - Grant Code as Wilfred Butler, age 80
  - Staats Cotsworth as Wilfred Butler (voice)
- Jay Garner as Dr. Robinson
- Donelda Dunne as Marianne Butler
  - Debbie Parness as Marianne Butler, age 8
- Michael Pendry as Doctor
- Lisa Blake Richards as Maggie Daly

Additionally, Candy Darling, Ondine, Tally Brown, Charlotte Fairchild, Lewis Love, Harvey Cohen, George Trakas, Susan Rothenberg, and Jack Smith appear as various party guests and psychiatric inmates in the film's flashback sequences.

== Themes ==
Writer Matthew DuPée notes that Silent Night, Bloody Night examines themes of abuse, victimization, madness, and perversion of justice. Biographer Tom Weaver notes that the film features commentary on power structures and the "polite society" of small communities. Film scholar Kim Newman comments on this theme in his book Nightmare Movies: Horror on Screen Since the 1960s (2011): "Silent Night, Bloody Night finds that all the pillars of the local community were once inmates of the asylum, and have been running the town since their violent mass breakout. In the canon of modern gothic themes, the evil asylum occupies roughly the same position held in the nineteenth century by the unholy convent."

== Production ==
=== Development ===
Writer Jeffrey Konvitz wrote the story for Silent Night, Bloody Night between 1969 and 1970 with his friend Ira Teller, after an unsuccessful stint working as a talent agent. He had previously become acquainted with director Theodore Gershuny and actress Mary Woronov, with whom he had attended Cornell University. The film originally had the working title Zora, which was the title of an unrelated screenplay owned by Cannon Films.

Konvitz asked Gershuny to direct, with Woronov, at that time Gershuny's soon-to-be wife, starring in the film. Konvitz described Gershuny as "a peculiar fellow... but that's why I hired him. I knew he was a bit bent." Gershuny and Woronov, both friends of Andy Warhol and associates of his Factory, brought on various Warhol superstars to appear in the film's flashback sequences as inmates and party guests. The film marked the production debut of co-producer Lloyd Kaufman.

=== Filming ===
Principal photography of Silent Night, Bloody Night began November 30, 1970 in Oyster Bay, and Old Westbury, New York, and lasted eighteen days. The production budget was between $212,000 and $295,000, The James William Beekman house (also known as The Cliffs estate) in Oyster Bay served as the Butler home in the film. The production was marked by technical issues early on due to inclement weather, resulting in electrical outages and camera operating equipment freezing in the cold temperatures.

Actor James Patterson became extremely ill with cancer during the latter part of the production, and was unable to continue filming, resulting in the editors having to restructure the film's conclusion. Konvitz recalled that "it wasn't written or meant to be shot that way... we rushed some scenes and had to cut some other things in. That's why the end might seem bizarre, disjointed."

In a retrospective interview, Woronov recalled making the film a "terrible" experience: "We were given a weird script, and Ted [Gershuny] tried to spark it up. He tried to make it an artistic statement, but it didn't work. It didn't even make much sense. Most people couldn't understand what was going on—which is not good, particularly for a horror film." Woronov did, however, provide favorable recollections of working with John Carradine, commenting: "It was very cold, and we all had to stay in a big old house in which we were shooting, but he never complained... Carradine was a real trouper."

=== Post-production ===
Post-production took place in the summer of 1972, with director Gershuny and editor Tom Kennedy completing dubbing, scoring, and sound effects with re-recording engineer Raun Kirves. The film was cut and edited using a Moviola machine.

== Release ==
The film was given a limited theatrical release in the United States under the title Night of the Dark Full Moon through Cannon Films, beginning November 15, 1972. (Note: Contemporaneous newspaper sources show the film opening on November 15, 1973 in Terre Haute, Indiana, and on November 17, 1972 in Scranton, Pennsylvania; and Binghamton, New York (among others) under the Night of the Full Dark Moon.) It was subsequently released as Silent Night, Bloody Night in the spring of 1973, and continued to screen under this title through December 1973, sometimes paired as a double feature with I, Monster or The Blood on Satan's Claw.

It subsequently screened in Australia in December 1974. The same year, the Sitges Film Festival in Spain screened the film as an official selection.

The film was released once again in 1981 by Cannon under the title Death House, stylized as Deathouse in some advertisements and on the film's title card. (Note: Trade advertisements printed by Cannon in 1981 bear the Deathouse title, as does the restored print of the film released on DVD by Film Chest in 2013.)

=== Copyright status ===
Although there is a 1972 copyright statement in the opening credits for Zora Investment Associates, the film was not registered for copyright, and since its release has fallen into public domain.

Regarding the film's copyright and ownership, writer Jeffrey Konvitz commented in a 2019 interview that Metro-Goldwyn-Mayer held the original film elements:

At some point, MGM had no idea who owned what regarding the rights to the film, and they told me, "Jeff, you own the film," and they wanted to give me back the film and sign over everything from the lab. And I said, "Let me tell you something: You're going to sign it back to me, and then you're going to discover that you [MGM] actually still own the film, and then you're going to want to take it all back." So I said to them, "No, you keep the film." Then later, about two years ago, we went in to try and get the remake rights, and they wouldn't sell it to us.

=== Television broadcast ===
In 1974, television broadcasting rights to the film were sold to CBS for $300,000, who subsequently screened it as a midnight movie. The film was also shown on Elvira's Movie Macabre, part of WWOR-TV's Fright Night beginning in 1978, and became a staple of late-night television in the November and December months. Despite the film's dark subject matter and depictions of violence, the network chose to air it at Christmastime each year. Executive Larry Casey commented on it, saying, "Don't get me wrong. I loved White Christmas and traditional holiday movies. But how many times can you watch those things? We always pushed the envelope on Fright Night, and Silent Night, Bloody Night was a great fit. WOR never got any complaints for showing it that I heard about."

=== Home media ===
The film had its VHS release by Paragon Video in the 1980s. In subsequent years, it has been made available on DVD from various entertainment companies that specialize in public domain films, though many of the prints on these editions are of extremely poor quality. The majority of the prints used on DVDs were sourced from the VHS transfer released by Paragon Video.

A high-definition restored print of the film (sourced from the original master of the Death House print) was released on DVD by Film Chest on December 10, 2013. The same print was also used for a DVD release by boutique company Code Red in 2013, in a limited edition double feature paired with Invasion of the Blood Farmers (1972). In June 2014, Vinegar Syndrome made this 720p HD version available for free digital download on their website.

== Reception ==
Though it received little critical notice at the times of its release, the film has received some assessment from various film critics, with praise for its atmosphere, experimental and arthouse qualities, as well as being noted as a proto-slasher film. In particular, its use of point-of-view shots from the killer's perspective predate those used in other subsequent slasher films, such as Black Christmas (1974) and Halloween (1978). In an article by Boston.com ranking the scariest films of all time, it placed at number 59, and was heralded as a "forgotten classic" and "the movie that birthed the modern slasher flick."

A review published by the magazine Castle of Frankenstein in 1973 was unfavorable, noting that the film appeared to have been "re-edited and reworked to such an extent in the intervening period that it makes little sense in its final form, although the plot had some potentially clever angles... otherwise, [it is] a hopeless jumble constricted by flashbacks-within-flashbacks, off-on narration by two different characters, [and] clumsy direction." (Note: Quoted in John Carradine: The Films (2024).)

In his book Slasher Films: An International Filmography, 1960 Through 2001, Kent Byron Armstrong wrote that the film "has a lethargic pace, but it provides enough intrigue and mystery to help a viewer retain interest." Film scholar John Kenneth Muir criticized the film in his book Horror Films of the 1970s, deeming it "technically incompetent" and deriding the screenplay and plot for its lack of cohesion. Biographer Tom Weaver disagrees with the sentiment that the film lacks narrative clarity, conceding that though it features some "odd plot glitches," it is "not nearly as incomprehensible as its detractors—star Mary Woronov included!–would have us believe," and ranked it among star John Carradine's better horror films.

Film writer Brian Albright described the film as stylistically moody and surreal, but similarly conceded that its plot is confusing. Writing for Bloody Disgusting, Bee Delores praised the film for its suspense, noting: "With its brisk runtime, clocking in at 83 minutes (including credits), Silent Night, Bloody Night tightens the screws in a way that make you frozen to the core." A review published by TV Guide similarly praised it for its "nicely atmospheric moments and some fairly shocking gore."

In a favorable retrospective review for the film's 50th anniversary in Rue Morgue, Mark Lager wrote that the film is "a criminally forgotten hidden gem...Gershon Kingsley’s music is cold and haunting, a melancholy mood." Writer Matthew DuPée notes that the film has received substantial criticism for its convoluted plot and "gritty" cinematography, but asserts that it is "propped up by a fascinating location, strong acting and a visceral story. The Christmas carol "Silent Night, Holy Night" plays as a musical motif throughout, adding a layer of acoustic eeriness to an already atmospheric haunted house tale." DuPée later added, "director Ted Gershuny’s highly stylistic approach, an amazing location, a competent cast, and a dreary and dark script that was ahead of its time."

== Franchise ==
=== Remakes ===
A remake by UK production company North Bank Entertainment, Silent Night, Bloody Night: The Homecoming, was released on DVD in the United States by Elite Entertainment in February 2014.

On December 10, 2016, the film was adapted into a play in Brooklyn, New York for a one-night-only production by One And Done Productions.

=== Sequels ===
New Wave Independent Pictures produced the sequel to the original film, titled Silent Night, Bloody Night 2: Revival. The film was released on March 15, 2015.

A second sequel titled Silent Night, Bloody Night 3: Descent was released on December 25, 2024.

== See also ==
- Holiday horror

== Sources ==
- Albright, Brian (2012). Regional Horror Films, 1958-1990: A State-by-State Guide with Interviews. Jefferson, North Carolina: McFarland & Company. ISBN 978-1-476-60042-0.
- Arena, James (2011). Fright Night on Channel 9: Saturday Night Horror Films on New York's WOR-TV. Jefferson, North Carolina: McFarland & Company. ISBN 978-0-786-46678-8.
- Armstrong, Kent Byron (2003). Slasher Films: An International Filmography, 1960 Through 2001. Jefferson, North Carolina: McFarland & Company. ISBN 978-0-786-41462-8.
- Colavito, Jason (2007). Knowing Fear: Science, Knowledge and the Development of the Horror Genre. Jefferson, North Carolina: McFarland & Company. ISBN 978-0-786-43273-8.
- DuPée, Matthew C. (2022). A Scary Little Christmas: A History of Yuletide Horror Films, 1972-2020. Jefferson, North Carolina: McFarland & Company. ISBN 978-1-476-64540-7.
- Muir, John Kenneth (2012). Horror Films of the 1970s. Jefferson, North Carolina: McFarland & Company. ISBN 978-0-786-49156-8.
- Newman, Kim (2011) [1988]. Nightmare Movies: Horror on Screen Since the 1960s (Revised ed.). London, England: Bloomsbury. ISBN 978-1-408-80503-9.
- Ocker, J. W. (2012). The New York Grimpendium: A Guide to Macabre and Ghastly Sites in New York State. Woodstock, Vermont: The Countryman Press. ISBN 978-0-881-50990-8.
- Singer, Michael (1989). Film Directors. Vol. 7. Beverly Hills, California: Lone Eagle Pub. ISBN 978-0-943-72827-8.
- Weaver, Tom (2024). John Carradine: The Films. Jefferson, North Carolina: McFarland & Company. ISBN 978-1-476-61164-8.
