= David Ruprecht =

American television actor (born 1948)

- Born: David Martin Ruprecht; October 14, 1948 (age 77); St. Louis, Missouri, U.S.
- Occupations: Television actor and game show host
- Years active: 1977–present
- Spouses: Ann Wilkinson (m. 1983; div. 1987); Patricia Colombo (m. 1988)

David Martin Ruprecht (born October 14, 1948) is an American television and stage actor and game show host, primarily known for his work as host of the Lifetime/PAX game show Supermarket Sweep.

== Career ==
Ruprecht graduated from Northeast High School in St. Petersburg, Florida, 1966 and majored in theater arts at Valparaiso University. In his third year at Valparaiso, he attended a drama school in Coventry, England, where he trained in mime and voice.

Ruprecht has hosted the live stage show version of The Price Is Right at casinos in Las Vegas, Atlantic City, Mississippi and Connecticut. He has also hosted Family Feud Live.

Ruprecht acted in television commercials in the 1970s including for the brands Bunn Coffee Maker, Burger Chef, and Oldsmobile. He guest-starred on more than 50 television shows, like Three's Company, on which his character married Janet Wood (Joyce DeWitt) in the series finale, HBO's True Blood, and the 1981 TV-movie The Harlem Globetrotters on Gilligan's Island as Thurston Howell IV, the son of Thurston Howell III. From 1990 to 1992, he played Dan Ryan on the NBC soap opera Days of Our Lives. Ruprecht co-starred in the Broadway production of Perfectly Frank in 1980, marking the first time he performed on Broadway, and later performed in the Showtime production of the same show. and did voice-over work for the 1985 animated series Yogi's Treasure Hunt.

In 1990, Ruprecht began hosting Supermarket Sweep and held the job until the show's cancellation in 2003. He auditioned as announcer for the 2020 ABC revival with host Leslie Jones.

== Personal life ==
Ruprecht was born in St. Louis, Missouri, to a Lutheran minister. He grew up in Florida, and graduated from Northeast High School in St. Petersburg, Florida, in 1966. Ruprecht previously served on the board of directors for the Downsize DC Foundation. He is a former executive director of the Libertarian Party of California and a long-time member of Rotary International.

He has been married twice. His first marriage was to actress Ann Wilkinson. He married choreographer Patti Colombo in November 1988.

He is a practicing member of the Lutheran Church – Missouri Synod.

He currently resides in Northern California with his wife. He has no children.

== Select filmography ==
Year	Title	Role	Notes
1977	The Rockford Files	David	1 episode: "The Mayor's Committee from Deer Lick Falls"
1979	Young Love, First Love	Wayne	TV film
1980	Benson	Ed Sherman	1 episode: "Chain of Command"
1980	The Misadventures of Sheriff Lobo	Hal Hendricks	1 episode: "Who's the Sexiest Girl in the World"
1981	The Incredible Shrinking Woman	Neighbor	
1981	The Harlem Globetrotters on Gilligan's Island	Thurston Howell IV	TV film
1981	Harry's Battles	Dr. Jorgenson	TV film
1982	Quincy, M.E.	Dr. Wilkens	1 episode: "The Flight of the Nightingale"
1982	Star Trek II: The Wrath of Khan	Kobayashi Maru Captain	Voice
1982	Jekyll and Hyde... Together Again	Brigham	
1983	Fame	Bernie	1 episode: "Love Is the Question"
1983	Foot in the Door	Gary	1 episode: "Jonah Moves Out"
1983	A Minor Miracle	Dickens	Alternate title: Young Giants
1983–84	Real People	Himself (co-host)	
1984	Match Game-Hollywood Squares Hour	Himself	5 episodes (January 2–6)
1984	Three's Company	Phillip Dawson	Recurring role (4 episodes)
1984	Airwolf	Carlson	1 episode: "The Truth About Holly"
1985	St. Elsewhere	Dennis Coler	1 episode: "Whistle, Wyler Works"
1985	Too Close for Comfort	Freddie Copperman	1 episode: "Freddie Loves It, We Love It, You're Cancelled"
1986	Riptide	Randall Pierson	1 episode: "The Play's the Thing"
1986	Simon & Simon	Navy Chief Hansen	1 episode: "A.W.O.L."
1987	Webster	Johnson	1 episode: "Secrets"
1987	Talking Walls		Alternate title: Motel Vacancy
1987	Small Wonder	Zack Davis	1 episode: "TV or Not TV"
1987	Punky Brewster	Johnny Prince	1 episode: "The Matchmaker"
1987	Married... with Children	Mr. Mallman	1 episode: "You Better Watch Out"
1988	Punky Brewster	Mr. Bowen	1 episode: "Radio Daze"
1988	Punky Brewster	Minister	1 episode: "Wedding Bells for Brandon"
1988	Matlock	Salesman	1 episode: "The Mistress"
1989	She's the Sheriff	Psychiatrist	1 episode: "I'm Okay, You're All Crazy"
1989	Moonlighting	Police Artist	1 episode: "Perfetc"
1990–95	Supermarket Sweep	Himself (host)	
1990	Taking Care of Business	Yuppie Dad	Alternate title: Filofax
1990–92	Days of Our Lives	Dan Ryan	Daytime serial
1993	Doogie Howser, M.D.	TV Interviewer	1 episode: "You've Come a Long Way, Babysitter"
1993	Sisters	Host	1 episode: "Different"
1994	Full House	TV Announcer	1 episode: "Making Out Is Hard to Do"
1996	Beverly Hills, 90210	Lawyer	1 episode: "The Things We Do for Love"
1997	Family Matters	Lee Macnamara	1 episode: "What Do You Know?"
1998	Beyond Belief: Fact or Fiction	Dr. Anderson	1 episode: "The Pass"
1998	Working	Announcer	1 episode: "The Consultant"
1999	I Lost My M in Vegas	Dealer	Short film
2000–03	Supermarket Sweep	Himself (host)	
2000	Family Law	Foster Dad	1 episode: "Metamorphosis"
2000	The '70s	Middle Aged Man	TV miniseries
2001	The Drew Carey Show	Inmate/Larry King	1 episode: "Bananas: Part 2"
2003	Finding Home	Pastor	
2004	Joan of Arcadia	Bill Cummins	1 episode: "Vanity, Thy Name Is Human"
2004	The Daze Before Christmas	Brandon Taylor	Direct-to-video film
2005	That's Easy for You to Say!	Brandon Taylor	Direct-to-video film
2005	Cold Case	Radio Broadcaster	1 episode: "Colors"
2006	The Bold and the Beautiful	Judge Bolan	1 episode: "Episode #1.4732"
2008	True Blood	Televangelist	1 episode: "Mine"
2013	Mister Scrooge to See You	Scrooge	
2016	Ultraman X The Movie	Narrator (voice)	English version
2017	Mercy Christmas	Abe Robillard	VOD release
2022	Star Trek: Prodigy	Kobayashi Maru Captain	Archive audio Episode: "Kobayashi"

== Accolades ==
Year	Award	Category	Work	Result
2020	Branson International Film Festival	Best Actor in a Feature Film	The Author, the Star, and the Keeper	Won

Preceded by Bill Malone (1965–67)	Host of Supermarket Sweep; 1990–95, 2000–03	Succeeded by Leslie Jones (2020 revival)
