= Arthur Thiele =

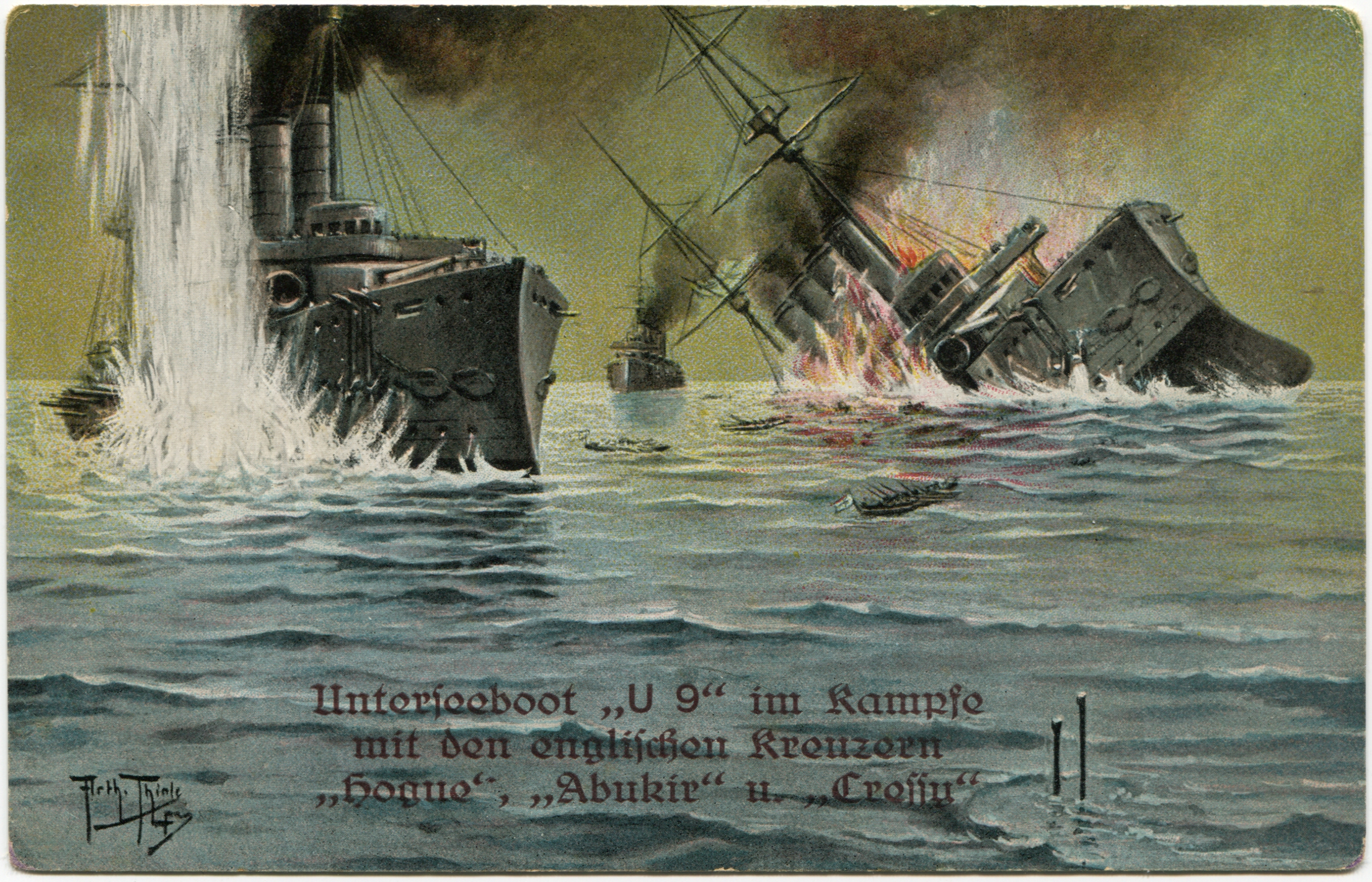
Arthur Thiele, "Submarine U-9 attacking the English cruisers Hogue, Aboukir, and Cressy"

Carl Robert Arthur Thiele (2 November 1860 – 18 June 1936) was a German painter, illustrator, draftsman, postcard designer, and watercolourist.

== Early life ==
Thiele was born in Leipzig, the son of Carl Gotthelf Thiele (1813–1885), an instrument maker, and his wife Friederike Wilhelmine Flügel (1817–1874) and grew up and studied art there.

== Work ==
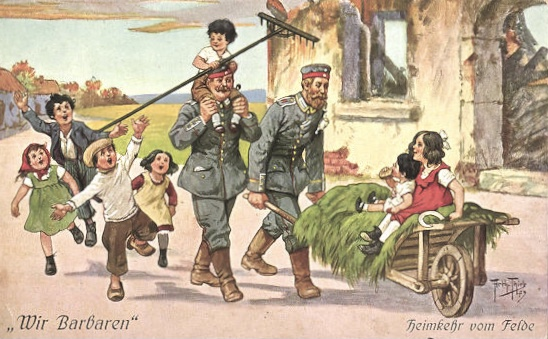
Thiele, "We Barbarians, coming home from the Field"

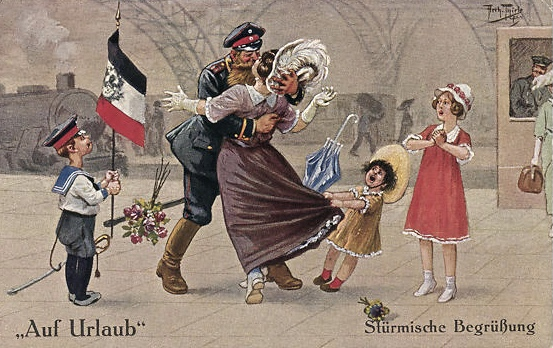
Thiele, "On Leave", 1916

Thiele designed album illustrations for the Cologne chocolate producer Ludwig Stollwerck, such as the Joke series for the Stollwerck album no. 13 of 1912.

Thiele's younger son Emil Max Fritz Thiele wrote in 1969:

All his life, with a few exceptions, he was doing bread and butter work, which, however, gave him great satisfaction ... sheet music, diplomas, postcards, book illustrations, designs for paper lanterns, school primers, children's books, jokes, and much more.

The postcard played a major role in Thiele's work. Among other subjects, he specialized in humanized animals, especially dachshunds and cats, and among fellow illustrators he was known as 'Dachshund-Thiele' or 'Katzen-Thiele'.

== Personal life ==
In 1886 Thiele married Lena Anna Louise Fischer (1861–1944). They had two sons: Carl Arthur Walter (born 1889), who became a painter, graphic artist, and lecturer at the Leipzig Academy of Art, and Emil Max Fritz (1899–1971).

== Commemoration ==
A street in Leipzig, Arthur-Thiele-Weg, is named after Thiele.

== Selected books illustrated ==
- Anna Marquardsen, Miezekätzchen. Ein Gruß unserm Liebling. Mit Bildern von Arthur Thiele (Nuremberg: Jasper, 1920)
- Albert Sixtus, Im Katzenkränzchen. Ein lustiges Bilderbuch. Mit Bildern von Arthur Thiele (Leipzig: Hahn, 1926); reprinted 1973, ISBN 3-87286-035-6
- Albert Sixtus, Wie Heini der Stärkste wurde. Mit Bildern von Arthur Thiele (Leipzig: Leipziger Graphische Werke, 1927)
- Albert Sixtus, Wie Susi die Schönste wurde. Mit Bildern von Arthur Thiele (Leipziger Graphische Werke, 1927)
- Albert Sixtus, Die beiden Ausreißer Mit Bildern von Arthur Thiele (Hildesheim: Borgmeyer, 1931)
- Albert Sixtus, Schützenfest in Katzenhausen. Mit Bildern von Arthur Thiele (Leipzig, Hahn, 1933); reprintec 1987, ISBN 3-87286-050-X
- Magda Trott, Jungmädchens Schritt ins Leben. Mit drei Vollbildern von Arthur Thiele (Leipzig: Graphische Werke, 1930)
