= Rage: Midsummer's Eve =

- Film poster
- Directed by: Tii Ricks
- Written by: Tii Ricks
- Starring: Holly Georgia; Johnny Sachon
- Cinematography: Lawrence Dolkart
- Edited by: Maria Haipus; Tii Ricks
- Production company: La Brea Pictures
- Distributed by: Amazon Instant Video
- Release date: 6 March 2015
- Running time: 90 minutes
- Country: United States
- Languages: English; Finnish
- Budget: $1.3 million

Rage: Midsummer's Eve is a 2015 American teen horror film written and directed by Tii Ricks. The film is starring Holly Georgia and Johnny Sachon.

== Plot ==
A group of American and British students studying in Finland embark on an adventure to the Arctic Circle to partake in the enigmatic and ancient Midsummer's Eve festival. This journey into the heart of Nordic folklore promises to unravel mysteries and forge unforgettable memories for the friends.

== Cast ==
- Holly Georgia as Hannah
- Johnny Sachon as Aron
- Michael Vardian as Kimi
- Christian Sandström as Jussi
- Greta Mandelin as Jenni
- Jussi 69 as DJ

== Release ==
In the Nordic countries, the film was only released online, but in the United States it was also shown in limited theaters.

== See also ==
- List of holiday horror films
