= Sholem Aleichem: Laughing in the Darkness =

Documentary film about the Yiddish writer

- Film poster
- Directed by: Joseph Dorman
- Written by: Joseph Dorman
- Narrated by: Alan Rosenberg
- Music by: John Zorn
- Release date: July 8, 2011
- Running time: 113 minutes
- Country: United States

Sholem Aleichem: Laughing in the Darkness is an American biographical documentary film about Yiddish writer Sholem Aleichem, who is best known for his stories about Tevye the Dairyman, the basis for the musical Fiddler on the Roof. The film uses historical photographs, film, and audio, as well as analysis by scholars and excerpts from his work read in Yiddish, to document the writer's life and the shtetl and Lower East Side lifestyles that influenced him. It was released on 8 July 2011 to positive reviews, and is one of only a small number of works with a 100% rating at the review aggregator Rotten Tomatoes.

== Synopsis ==
Sholem Aleichem: Laughing in the Darkness was written and directed by Joseph Dorman. The film debuted in Manhattan on July 8, 2011, with a run-time of 113 minutes. The documentary focuses on both the life of Yiddish writer Sholem Aleichem, as well as 19th century Eastern European Jewish culture, which shaped Aleichem and his works. The film details Aleichem's early life in the Tsarist Russian Empire, his surviving the 1905 Kiev pogrom and subsequent emigration to New York, his initial struggles in New York and subsequent return to Eastern Europe, and his return - shortly before his death - to New York, to significant acclaim. The documentary also explores his pioneering role in creating Yiddish-language literature. Although Aleichem is best known for his stories about Tevye, which would go on to be adapted into the musical Fiddler on the Roof, the documentary details his other works as well, and draws parallels between Aleichem's personal desire for riches and that of Tevye.

Writing for The New York Times, reviewer Stephen Holden noted that one of the themes of the documentary was the competing desires for Jews from that period to both remember their heritage and also leave behind a painful history of mistreatment and pogroms, and that Aleichem was a "personification of the tug of war" between these two desires.

The documentary is narrated by actor Alan Rosenberg, with appearances from fellow actors Peter Riegert, Rachel Dratch, and Jason Kravits reading excerpts of his works. Others featured in the documentary include the lyricist for Fiddler on the Roof, Sheldon Harnick, and Aleichem's granddaughter, novelist Bel Kaufman, who was 100 years old at the time.

== Reception ==
The film was received positively by critics. It is one of only a small number of films to have a 100% rating on the review aggregator Rotten Tomatoes, indicating that all of the reviews from reviewers tracked by the aggregator were positive. The film received a score of 77 out of 100 from the aggregator Metacritic, based on 15 reviews. Writing for the Chicago Tribune, Michael Phillips gave the film 3.5 out of 4 stars, saying that the film was "Wonderfully rich, like one of Tevye's monologues" and that director Joseph Dorman's "touch is sure, his pacing fleet and his chorus of voices marvelous". The New York Times's Holden called the film a "rich, beautifully organized and illustrated modern history of Eastern European Jewry" told through the lens of Aleichem and designated it a NYT Critic's Pick. Mark Feeney of The Boston Globe had special praise for the film's score, composed by John Zorn, in his three out of four stars review.
