= King of the Corner =

2004 film

- Directed by: Peter Riegert
- Written by: Peter Riegert; Gerald Shapiro
- Produced by: Melissa Marr; Lemore Syvan
- Starring: Peter Riegert; Isabella Rossellini; Eric Bogosian; Eli Wallach; Beverly D'Angelo; Rita Moreno
- Cinematography: Mauricio Rubinstein
- Edited by: Mario Ontal
- Music by: Al Kooper
- Distributed by: Ardustry Home Entertainment (Worldwide)
- Release date: June 2004 (Newport Film Festival)
- Running time: 93 minutes
- Country: United States
- Language: English

King of the Corner is a 2004 American independent comedy-drama film featured at the Newport Film Festival. It stars Peter Riegert and Isabella Rossellini, and includes Eric Bogosian, Eli Wallach, Beverly D'Angelo and Rita Moreno. It was released in 2004. Peter Riegert also co-wrote and directed the film.

It is a story of a middle-age man going through family and work issues.

== Cast ==
- Peter Riegert as Leo Spivak
- Frank Wood as Anthony Berenson
- Jake Hoffman as Ed Shifman
- Jayne Houdyshell as Louise
- Marylouise Burke as Helen
- Susan Blommaert as Gloria (credited as Susan Blommert)
- Eli Wallach as Sol Spivak
- Rita Moreno as Inez
- Harris Yulin as Peter Hargrove
- Isabella Rossellini as Rachel Spivak
- Ashley Johnson as Elena Spivak
- Mercedes Herrero as Dotty
- Dominic Chianese as Stan Marshak
- Judy Reyes as Nurse Kathleen Delehant
- Beverly D'Angelo as Betsy Ingraham
- Peter Friedman as Arthur Wexler
- Mary Catherine Wright as Miriam
- Jennifer Albano as Carolyn
- Michi Barall as Belinda
- Susan Pourfar as Lisa
- Angela Hughes as Joy
- Cal Robertson as Todd
- Ben Weber as Dr. Collins
- Eric Bogosian as Rabbi Evelyn Fink
- Penny Fuller as Mrs. Hargrove
- Alecia Hurst as Greta Braunsweig
- Denis McKeown as Mr. Butterworth (uncredited)
