= Fritz Baumgarten (illustrator) =

German illustrator (1883–1966)

- Born: Friedrich "Fritz" Karl Baumgarten; August 18, 1883; Reudnitz (now part of Leipzig)
- Died: 3 November 1966 (aged 83); Leipzig
- Spouse: Elsa Baumgarten (nee Hollburg)
- Children: 2

Fritz Baumgarten (18 August 1883, Reudnitz (now part of Leipzig) – 3 November 1966, Leipzig) was a German illustrator, lithographer, draftsman, and painter.

He illustrated several hundred published picture books, especially children's books, mainly in the 1920s to 1960s, most of which were published before World War II. He also illustrated postcards, Advent calendars, and picture books of fairy tales by the Brothers Grimm.

His fantasy world was populated with animals, elves, and fairies, farm animals, children and teddy bears living in temperate forests and meadows. He acknowledged that his style of anthropomorphized animals, small beings, and plants was influenced by the illustrator Ernst Kreidolf. Fritz Baumgarten himself inspired the artist Lore Hummel.

He used light pen strokes painted with watercolours. His style was modern for the time, loose and impressionistic, but was grounded in figure drawing, animal drawing and academic composition.

== History ==
Fritz Baumgarten studied at the Fine Arts academies in Dresden and Munich, then completed military service, before returning to Leipzig in 1908. He initially earned his living as a freelance designer and illustrator mainly of postcards.

During World War I, he fought in France, including at Verdun. For his services, he received the Iron Cross Second Class (Eiserne Kreuz zweiter Klasse).

Fritz Baumgarten married Elsa Hollburg in 1926. After a stopover in Sachsenberg-Georgenthal, where the artist was conscripted to work in an armaments factory, the Baumgartens moved to Reichenbach. In the summer of 1946 the family returned to the Connewitz district of Leipzig. Fritz Baumgarten, who joined the Free German Trade Union Confederation around the mid-1950s, immediately made contact with various publishers in West and East Germany, such as Lange & Meuche Verlag, Scholz Verlag, Engelbert Dessart Verlag, Titania Verlag and others. Disguising them as "small pictures for the little nieces and nephews" the artist sent his illustrations to West Germany. The fee was sent to him in kind or credited to accounts in the West.

Around the beginning of the 1960s, his creative power waned, Fritz Baumgarten was soon 80 years old, and the number of his annually published children's and picture books decreased significantly.

== Works ==
=== In English ===
Books that were translated into English include:

- Spring In The Enchanted Forest, published by Crescent, ISBN 9780-517469804
- Summer In The Enchanted Forest, published by Crescent, ISBN 978-0517469811
- Autumn In The Enchanted Forest, published by Crescent, ISBN 978-0517469798
- Winter In The Enchanted Forest, published by Crescent, ISBN 978-0517469828
- Adventures of Timothy and Nicky, Marilyn Nickson (Author), Fritz Baumgarten (Illustrator), published by Ward, Lock & Co., ISBN 978-0706362336

=== In German ===
For a list of printed material in German see Fritz Baumgarten (German Wikipedia page).

Fritz Baumgarten illustrated books written by Albert Sixtus, Märchen von Erich Heinemann, Helge Darnstädt, Lena Hahn, Liselotte Burger, Rose Pflock, Friedrich Zöbigker, Hamster und Igel, Eine lustige Geschichte, Wolfgang Männel, Christine Groß. His publishers included Esslinger, Alfred Hahn, Parabel, Beltz & Gelberg (Verlagsgruppe Beltz), Titania, and Terzio.
