= James Patterson (actor) =

American actor (1932–1972)

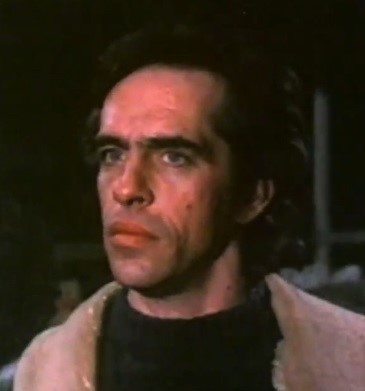
- Patterson in 1970
- Born: June 29, 1932; Derry, Pennsylvania, U.S.
- Died: August 19, 1972 (aged 40); New York City, New York, U.S.
- Resting place: Coles Cemetery in Derry, Pennsylvania, U.S.
- Occupation: Actor
- Years active: 1957–1972
- Spouse: Rochelle Oliver (m. 1959)
- Children: 1

James Patterson (June 29, 1932 – August 19, 1972) was an American actor who won a Tony Award for his role in the 1968 Harold Pinter play The Birthday Party.

== Early life and education ==
Patterson was born in Derry, Pennsylvania. For a time he was a painter, but he later studied acting at the Carnegie Institute of Technology with Herbert Berghof. He met his future wife, actress Rochelle Oliver, while working on an off-Broadway production of The Brothers Karamazov. They married in 1959 and by 1960 were living together in a small apartment on the Upper East Side.

== Career ==
Patterson was both a stage and screen actor. His career started on a Pittsburgh radio show, 'Starlets on Parade', as a boy soprano.

For his stage work, he won both Tony and Obie awards. On screen, he appeared in Robert Rossen's 1964 film Lilith and then made numerous guest appearances on television, including a 1968 appearance as Dave Barca in Hawaii Five-O (episode: 'The Ways of Love').

In 1970, Patterson was in the horror-slasher film Silent Night, Bloody Night, playing Jeffrey Butler, a man trying to sell a house with a terrible history. The film was not released until after his death.

== Death ==
In 1972, Patterson died of cancer, aged 40, at Lenox Hill Hospital in New York City. He was survived by his wife Rochelle and son John.

== Filmography ==
Films
Title	Year	Role	Director	Notes
Lilith	1964	Dr. Lavrier	Robert Rossen	
In the Heat of the Night	1967	Lloyd Purdy	Norman Jewison	
Castle Keep	1969	Elk	Sydney Pollack	
A Fable	1971	The Husband	Al Freeman Jr.	
Silent Night, Bloody Night	1972	Jeffrey Butler	Theodore Gershuny	(final film role)

Television shows
Title	Episode	Role	Director	Air date	Notes
Deadline	"The Case of the Stranger"	Stagg		5 November 1959	
Buick-Electra Playhouse	"The Fifth Column"		John Frankenheimer	29 January 1960	
The Witness	"Bugsy Siegel "		Ralph Nelson	27 October 1960	
The DuPont Show of the Month	"I, Don Quixote"	Anselmo	Karl Genus	9 November 1959	
The DuPont Show of the Month	"The Lincoln Murder Case"		Alex Segal	18 February 1961	
Play of the Week	"The Master Builder "	Ragnar Brovik	John Stix	21 March 1960	
Play of the Week	"A Cool Wind Over the Living"	Lexy	Joseph LeSueur	27 March 1961	
Way Out	"Dissolve to Black"	Nighttime Harry	William Corrigan	2 June 1961	
Look Up and Live	"The Flies"	Oreste	Joseph K. Chomyn	27 August 1961	
Route 66	"A Bridge Across Five Days"	Paul Guin	Richard Donner	17 November 1961	
Naked City	"Strike a Statue "	Carver	John Newland	16 May 1962	
The Defenders	"The Unwanted "	Barney LeMay	Alex March	13 October 1962	
Alcoa Premiere	"The Contenders"	Barnaby Evans	David Lowell Rich	6 December 1962	
Stoney Burke	"Joby"	Mark Wheeler	John Erman	18 March 1963	
Naked City	"Stop the Parade! A Baby Is Crying! "	Phil North	William A. Graham	20 April 1963	
The Defenders	"Loophole "	Don Franks	Charles S. Dubin	16 November 1963	
East Side/West Side	"Don't Grow Old "	Fred Cameron	Herschel Daugherty	17 February 1964	
The Defenders	"Survival"	Minister	Tom Gries	14 March 1964	
Brenner	"Point of Law"	Bert	Herman Hoffman	14 June 1964	
Slattery's People	"Question: Did He Who Made the Lamb Make Thee?"	Adam Marsten	Richard C. Sarafian	5 March 1965	
The Big Valley	"The Young Marauders "	Jamie Drumm	Paul Wendkos	6 October 1965	
The Felony Squad	"The Immaculate Killer"	Peter Holland	Seymour Robbie	24 October 1966	
Flipper	"A Dolphin in Time "	Scott Emson	Edward Haldeman	25 February 1967	
Hawaii Five-O	"The Ways of Love "	Dave Barca	Charles Dubin	21 November 1968	
Bonanza	"A World Full of Cannibals"	Charles Ball	Gunnar Hellström	22 December 1968	
Mission: Impossible	"The System"	Johnny Costa	Robert Gist	26 January 1969	
Mission: Impossible	"The Double Circle"	Victor Laszlo	Barry Crane	7 December 1969	
