= Zero Day (film) =

2003 found footage drama film by Ben Coccio

- Promotional release poster
- Directed by: Ben Coccio
- Written by: Ben Coccio; Christopher Coccio
- Produced by: Ben Coccio
- Starring: Andre Keuck; Cal Robertson
- Cinematography: Ben Coccio
- Edited by: Ben Coccio; David Shuff
- Music by: Benji Cossa
- Distributed by: Avatar Films
- Release date: July 24, 2002
- Running time: 92 minutes
- Country: United States
- Language: English
- Budget: $20,000
- Box office: $8,466

Zero Day is a 2002 American found footage drama film written and directed by Ben Coccio and starring Andre Keuck and Cal Robertson, revolving around a duo planning a school shooting, documented through the perspective of a video filming camera.

== Plot ==
Andre Kriegman (born July 17, 1982) and Calvin "Cal" Gabriel (born February 5, 1983) are two teenage friends living in New Stratford, Connecticut, USA. The two begin filming a series of video recordings on June 23, 2000, with announcing their intention to commit a school shooting at Iroquois High School, where they are both students. They call their plan "Zero Day" and themselves "The Army of Two". Both teens are troubled, as Cal exhibits signs of depression and suicidal ideation alongside his unmedicated ADD, while Andre varies between apathetic, hateful, or vindictive towards his peers and surroundings, and is drawn toward firearms and explosives.

The majority of the film is portrayed through a Camcorder and shows them documenting their planning and preparation for the attack, while hiding it from their friends and families. Their motive for the attack is inconclusive, with several conflicting or insufficient reasons being stated throughout the movie, especially during their penultimate video suicide note recorded on April 29, 2001.

Scenes include typical adolescent activities, such as the two attending Andre's birthday party, egging the house of a fellow student they don't like, and Cal going to prom, while Andre works at a local pizza establishment. The rest of the entries are dedicated to the planning of the attack. In one of these video entries, Cal notes the origin of the name "Zero Day": when him and Andre originally planned to attack the school on the first day that the temperature would drop to zero degrees Fahrenheit, after they had finished their preparations. However, this only occurred once, during which Andre was sick, and so they set May 1, 2001, as the new date. Wanting their attack to have a memorable name, they agreed to keep the original title.

The two arrive at school on the day of the attack and prepare their plans and weapons in Andre's car. Andre says that he could never have carried out Zero Day without Cal's help, a sentiment that the latter echoes. The video camera is set on the dashboard in the car and continues to film as they both run into the school through its west entrance, armed with a large number of firearms stolen from Andre's father and cousin, including three handguns and two long guns, as well as homemade explosives and knives.

Henceforth, the massacre is shown through the viewpoint of several black-and-white security cameras throughout the building, with audio of a 911 dispatcher playing in the background, who is attempting to persuade the two out of the attack and into surrendering peacefully. This dialogue is heard via the cellphone of student Omar Walters, who was previously shot and killed in the library. Neither of the shooters acknowledge the dispatcher, though she can evidently hear them and relays useful information to the police.

Shooting at anyone they see, while threatening and taunting several witnesses, Andre and Cal kill a total of eleven students, one school resource officer and wound eighteen others via gunfire or shrapnel from their homemade pipe bombs. Eventually, the two see law enforcement surrounding the school after fourteen minutes of the incident in progress. After debating over whether to exchange gunfire with police, the pair decide to commit suicide by gunshot inside the library of the school.

On May 10, nine days after the shooting, a group of youths film themselves driving to a makeshift memorial outside the school for those slain in the attack. It consists of fourteen wooden crosses, including both Andre and Cal. The group locates the pair's crosses, before subsequently setting them on fire and swiftly escaping the area. The film ends on a shot of the two crosses burning in the dark.

== Cast ==
- Andre Keuck as Andre Kriegman
- Cal Robertson as Calvin Gabriel
- Christopher Coccio as Chris Kriegman
- Rachel Benichak as Rachel Lurie
- Gerhard Keuck as Gerhard Kriegman
- Johanne Keuck as Johanne Kriegman
- Pam Robertson as Pam Gabriel
- Steve Robertson as Steve Gabriel
- Serataren Adragna as Prom Goer
- Josh Bednarsky as Prom Goer
- Greg Murphy as Greg Krupa (Prom Goer)
- Brian Reed as Prom Goer
- Omar Walters as a shooting victim of the same name

== Production ==
The film's director Ben Coccio recalls that he was in a pizzeria in Brooklyn, New York, just finishing his first 35mm short film, on the day of the 1999 Columbine High School massacre, and saw coverage of the event on the eatery's television, commenting, "I remember thinking that I was surprised that it hadn't happened sooner." Coccio was also struck by the extent to which Eric Harris and Dylan Klebold planned that shooting, compared to the impromptu crimes of passion that typified other school shootings. Coccio became eager to address a story in a way that was very different and not exploitative, and drew upon his own views of high school as a place of tension where "anything could happen at any time". Coccio felt as if it had to be "done just right." He continued, "if it turns into a oversimplified polemic or melodrama, then it’s worse than making a bad movie—it’s taking a dump on someone’s grave." Coccio's theory of student school shooters is not that they are the most bullied, as such students tend to develop feelings of inferiority and are likely to harm themselves. Coccio feels that shooters tend to be students with feelings of superiority, and that "when other people don't confirm that, it really gets under their skin."

While working at a temporary job in March 2001, Coccio experienced near-death during a car crash. The experience gave him the motivation to make the movie, stating, "If I want to make a movie, I'd better make it, because tomorrow may never come". The idea of the video camera came while Coccio researched further into the Columbine High School massacre, where he discovered Eric Harris and Dylan Klebold recorded part of their preparations for the massacre through a video camera. Coccio started writing the script in April, and shooting for the film began in July, and ended in October.

None of the Connecticut high schools where he sought to film the movie would allow Coccio access, and he ended up using the interior of a building at State University of New York in Purchase, New York. The "appropriately fortress-like" exterior of the High School was New Milford High School in New Milford, Connecticut, where Coccio lived at the time. Reportedly, he did not receive formal permission to film at the school grounds, and did so in secret.

When casting, Coccio inquired at high schools throughout Connecticut looking for teenagers interested in acting who might not have much or any professional experience. Coccio had three days of open auditions, during which he did not inform the interviewees of the film's nature. 16-year-old Andre Keuck responded to an ad Coccio placed in Backstage Magazine and brought his classmate and fellow theater enthusiast Cal Robertson along to the audition. Both boys had acted in Shakespeare productions at the Stratford Avon Theater in Stratford, Connecticut. They were encouraged to improvise throughout the film's production.

== Website ==
An official website was made as a tie-in to promote the film, made to look like an official police report by the fictional "Essex County Sheriff's Department" on the event, describing details about the massacre that were never seen in the final film and glimpses about the perpetrators, the weapons used, and mentions that the movie actually consists of footage sent at the request of Kriegman and Gabriel's parents to an amateur filmmaker friend. The website is now archived by use of the Wayback Machine, although some features that seem to push the narrative that it was real have been lost. This attempt to blur the line between fiction and reality characteristic for found-footage films in the near legacy of The Blair Witch Project, which many initially believed to be real.

== Reception and legacy ==
Zero Day has received mostly positive reviews from critics, currently holding a 68% approval rating on Rotten Tomatoes based on 41 critic reviews.

At the 2002 Denver Film Festival, Coccio took part in a panel with Michael Moore, director of Bowling for Columbine, Paul F. Ryan, director of Home Room, and Tom Mauser, father of Columbine victim Daniel Mauser. During the panel, Mauser campaigned against the gun show loophole law in Colorado. The discussion also brought up violent films. According to Coccio, Mauser would watch all these films and would endorse them, saying, "it's a good thing people and artists and filmmakers are exploring this subject matter, we should all explore this subject matter". Mauser did not comment specifically on Zero Day, Coccio speculated, "what he thought of my film I don't know, but if I had to guess I would think my film probably distressed him. But as I say, he endorsed these films across the board, which was a brave thing to do". Coccio also participated in a panel with Michael Scott, a survivor of the Columbine attack and mentioned the discussion in an interview however, stating his impression that Scott feared that violent media such as his film would encourage additional attacks.

Discussing mental illness and its portrayal in films, Alyssa Miller, a writer who writes for the site Scriptophobic.ca, wrote that "director Ben Coccio created a perfect portrayal of psychopathy in character Andre, who does not have remorse for the things he does, even if they are done to people close to him". On the other hand, Alyssa continues, "character Calvin, Andre's accomplice, is more of a sociopath due to his visible remorse towards the people he cares about and his reckless disregard for his own safety".

=== Home media ===
Zero Day would receive its first DVD release in Japan on November 25, 2004, by Orustak Pictures. The release did not have a Japanese dub, only Japanese subtitles.

Zero Day received a DVD release in the United States on April 5, 2005, by Home Vision Entertainment. Extras on the DVD include a feature-length audio commentary featuring director Coccio, and actor Andre Keuck, a behind-the-scenes featurette, "The 'Making of' Zero Day", actors Keuck and Cal Robertson in a screen test and their full home videos that are partially seen earlier in the film during the title, as well as the film's theatrical trailer.

On April 4, 2006, Zero Day received a DVD release in the United Kingdom by FremantleMedia. For this release, a scene where the characters detailed a guide on how to build homemade explosives and to avoid capture was cut to comply with the BBFC Guidelines and Policy and the Video Recordings Act 1984.

== Awards ==
- Atlanta Film Festival – Grand Jury Award 2003
- Boston Underground Film Festival – Best of Festival 2003
- Film Fest New Haven – Audience Choice Award, Best Dramatic Feature 2002
- Florida Film Festival – Grand Jury Award for Best Narrative Feature 2003
- Rhode Island Film Festival – Audience Award 2003
- Slamdunk Film Festival – Grand Jury Award 2003

== See also ==
- Elephant, another Columbine-inspired film released in 2003
- Bowling for Columbine, a documentary about gun violence in America with emphasis on the Columbine massacre
- Duck! The Carbine High Massacre, a film made in 1999 inspired by the Columbine High School massacre
- Heart of America, another film revolving around a fictionalized school massacre
- The Only Way, a 2004 independent film inspired by the Columbine High School massacre
- List of films set around May Day
- List of films featuring psychopaths and sociopaths

== Trivia ==
- The film's fictional setting of New Stratford is evidently based on the town both starring actors hail from, Stratford.
- Essex County, as listed in the fictional sheriff's department website does not exist in Connecticut, but does in the states of Massachusetts, New Jersey, New York, Virginia, and Vermont. The closest nominal match would be Middlesex County, though the based-upon Stratford is a part of Fairfield County.
- Originally, the two main characters were called Avery Kriegman and Thomas Gabriel. These first names were placeholders for when Coccio found suitable actors.
- Keuck originally auditioned for the role of Gabriel, which his friend Cal ended up receiving instead, while he was cast as Kriegman.
