= List of Easter films =

This is a list of films that have something to do with Easter, or have Easter as a significant part of them, or just contain the character of the Easter Bunny. For Easter specials of regular TV shows, see the list of Easter television specials.

== Animated ==
- Baby Looney Tunes' Eggs-traordinary Adventure (2003)
- Bosko's Easter Eggs, a MGM short featuring Bosko (1937)
- Easter Yeggs, a Looney Tunes short starring Bugs Bunny, released June 28, 1947
- The Egg Cracker Suite (1943)
- Funny Little Bunnies, a 1934 Silly Symphony from Disney
- Happy Go Ducky, a MGM short starring Tom and Jerry (1958)
- Here Comes Peter Cottontail, a 1971 stop motion animated TV special produced by Rankin/Bass Productions.
- Hop, a 2011 Easter-themed live-action and animated comedy film directed by Tim Hill
- It's the Easter Beagle, Charlie Brown, a 1974 Easter-themed animated TV special directed by Phil Roman
- Rabbit Academy: Mission Eggpossible, a 2021 Austrian-German 3D animated film directed by Ute von Münchow-Pohl
- Rabbit School – Guardians of the Golden Egg, a 2017 German 3D animated film directed by Ute von Münchow-Pohl
- Rise of the Guardians, a 2012 DreamWorks Animation 3D animated film directed by Peter Ramsey
- Winnie the Pooh: Springtime with Roo, a 2004 animated film from the Winnie The Pooh franchise
- The King of Kings, 2025 animated film from Angel Studios.
- Wallace & Gromit: The Curse of the Were-Rabbit, 2005 animated film from Aardman Animations

== Comedy ==
- Chocolat, a 2000 French comedy-drama film
- Easter Sunday, a 2022 film directed by Jay Chandrasekhar
- Hank and Mike, a 2008 film directed by Matthiew Klinck
- Happy Easter (Joyeuses Pâques), a 1984 French comedy film
- Life of Brian, a 1979 film about a man mistaken for the Messiah.
- Mallrats, a 1995 comedy film directed by Kevin Smith
- Pieces of Easter, a 2013 film directed by Jefferson Moore
- Steel Magnolias, a 1989 film directed by Herbert Ross
- The Santa Clause 2, a 2002 film directed by Michael Lembeck
- The Santa Clause 3: The Escape Clause, a 2006 film directed by Michael Lembeck
- Hop, a 2011 film directed by Tim Hill

== Family ==
- Baby Huey's Great Easter Adventure, a 1999 live-action direct-to-video film directed by Stephen Furst
- North, a 1994 film directed by Rob Reiner
- Santa and the Ice Cream Bunny, 1972 film directed by Richard Winer and Barry Mahon

== Featuring Jesus's Easter morning resurrection ==
- Barabbas (1953)
- Barabbas (1961)
- Barabbas (2012)
- The Birth, the Life and the Death of Christ (1906)
- The Day Christ Died (1980)
- Golgotha (1935)
- The Gospel According to St. Matthew (1964)
- The Gospel of John (2003)
- The Gospel of John (2014)
- The Greatest Story Ever Told (1965)
- I.N.R.I. (1923)
- Intolerance (1916)
- Jesus (1973)
- Jesus (1979)
- Killing Jesus (2015)
- The King of Kings (1927)
- King of Kings (1961)
- Kristo (1996)
- The Last Temptation of Christ (1988)
- The Miracle Maker (2000)
- The Passion of the Christ (2004)
- Peter and Paul (1981)
- The Resurrection of the Christ (TBA)
- Risen (2016)
- The Robe (1953)
- Son of God (2014)
- The Visual Bible: Matthew (1993)

== Horror ==
- Beaster Day: Here Comes Peter Cottonhell (2014)
- Critters 2: The Main Course (1988)
- Easter Bunny, Kill! Kill!, a 2006 film written and directed by Chad Ferrin
- Easter Bloody Easter, a 2024 horror film
- Holidays, a 2016 horror-anthology film

== Musical ==
- Easter Parade, a 1948 film directed by Charles Walters starring Judy Garland and Fred Astaire, with songs by Irving Berlin

== Mystery ==
- Wake Up Dead Man, a 2025 film directed by Rian Johnson

== See also ==
- List of Easter television episodes
- List of Christmas films
- List of films based on the Bible
