= Peter Riegert =

American actor (born 1947)

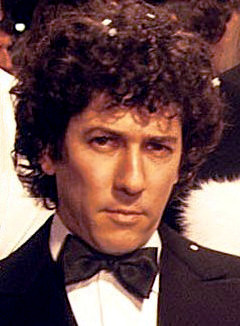
- Riegert at the premiere of The Rose in 1979
- Born: April 11, 1947 (age 79); The Bronx, New York, U.S.
- Education: University at Buffalo
- Occupation: Actor
- Years active: 1975–present
- Spouse: Cornelia Read (m. 2019)

Peter Riegert (/riːɡɜːrt/ REE-gert; born April 11, 1947) is an American actor. He is best known for his roles as Donald "Boon" Schoenstein in Animal House (1978), oil company executive "Mac" MacIntyre in Local Hero (1983), pickle store owner Sam Posner in Crossing Delancey (1988) and Lt. Mitch Kellaway in The Mask (1994). He directed the short film By Courier (2000), for which he was nominated along with producer Ericka Frederick for the Academy Award for Best Live Action Short Film.

On television, Riegert had a recurring role as crooked Newark Assemblyman and later State Senator Ronald Zellman in seasons three and four of the HBO series The Sopranos (2001–2002), appeared as George Moore in the first season of the FX series Damages (2007), and portrayed Seth Green's father in the comedy series Dads (2013–2014). He was nominated for a Primetime Emmy Award for his performance in the HBO film Barbarians at the Gate in 1993.

== Early life and education ==
Riegert was born on April 11, 1947, in the Bronx, New York, the son of Lucille, a piano teacher, and Milton Riegert, a food wholesaler. Riegert grew up in Hartsdale, New York, and was raised in a non-observant Jewish household.

He graduated from Ardsley High School in 1964 and later from the University at Buffalo. He worked at a number of jobs, including teaching, waiting tables, and as a social worker before settling on acting as a career.

== Career ==
=== Stage ===
Riegert made his Broadway debut in the musical Dance with Me. Other Broadway credits include The Old Neighborhood, An American Daughter, The Nerd, and Censored Scenes From King Kong. Off-Broadway he has appeared in Road to Nirvana, The Birthday Party, Isn't It Romantic, Sexual Perversity in Chicago, and A Rosen by Any Other Name.

=== Film ===
Riegert's film debut came in 1978's National Lampoon's Animal House. He has subsequently appeared in films such as Crossing Delancey, Local Hero, The Mask, Traffic, and We Bought a Zoo.

=== Television ===
Riegert made his television debut in two episodes of M*A*S*H. He has also portrayed Newark Assemblyman and later New Jersey State Senator Ronald Zellman in The Sopranos and defense attorney Chauncey Zeirko in multiple episodes of Law & Order: Special Victims Unit. He starred opposite former girlfriend Bette Midler in the television adaptation of Gypsy and was featured in the HBO drama Barbarians at the Gate (which earned him an Emmy Award nomination for Outstanding Supporting Actor in a Miniseries or a Special). He also starred as composer Jake Rubin (based on real-life composer Irving Berlin) in the 1984 miniseries Ellis Island, the final episode of Seinfeld as the president of NBC, and the television movie Back When We Were Grownups. Riegert voiced the character of Max Weinstein in the controversial episode "When You Wish Upon a Weinstein" of Family Guy. Riegert guest-starred in a Season 2 episode of Leverage as corrupt lawyer Peter Blanchard. In 2011, Riegert began a multi-episode arc on One Tree Hill as August Kellerman, Nathan's unforgiving college professor. Riegert appeared as the character George Moore in Season 1 of Damages. He also appeared in a recurring role as Judge Harvey Winter in CBS' The Good Wife. He appeared in Dads as David Sachs, the father of Eli Sachs, played by Seth Green. Riegert also appeared in Seasons 3 and 4 of Unbreakable Kimmy Schmidt. He made a multi-episode guest appearance in the second half of the Netflix original comedy series Disjointed. Riegert has a recurring role as left-wing lawyer Roger Pugh on Season 3 of the HBO series Succession.

=== Director and writer ===
Riegert made his screenwriting and directorial debuts with By Courier, based on a short story by O. Henry. It received an Academy Award nomination for Best Live Action Short Film and won him the Festival Award for Best First Feature at the Marco Island Film Festival.

Riegert also directed and co-wrote King of the Corner, a 2004 film featured at the Newport Film Festival, in which he also starred alongside Isabella Rossellini. It also featured Eric Bogosian, Dominic Chianese, Beverly D'Angelo and Rita Moreno.

=== Voice work ===
Riegert narrated the audiobook of Michael Chabon's The Yiddish Policemen's Union, which was nominated for a 2008 Audie Award in literary fiction. He also narrated the audiobook of The Voyage of the Narwhal, and has read the stories of Raymond Carver.

He was also the narrator for The First Basket, a documentary film on professional basketball's influence on Jewish culture.

== Personal life ==
Riegert has dated actresses Bette Midler and Bonnie Bedelia. He has been married to Cornelia Read since 2019.

== Filmography ==
=== Film ===
| Year | Title | Role | Notes |
|---|---|---|---|
| 1978 | National Lampoon's Animal House | Donald "Boon" Schoenstein | |
| 1979 | Americathon | McMerkin | |
| 1979 | Chilly Scenes of Winter | Sam | |
| 1981 | National Lampoon's Movie Madness | Jason Cooper | |
| 1983 | Local Hero | MacIntyre | |
| 1983 | Le Grand carnaval | Walter Giammanca | |
| 1987 | A Man in Love | Michael Pozner | |
| 1987 | The Stranger | Dr. Harris Kite | |
| 1988 | Crossing Delancey | Sam Posner | |
| 1989 | That's Adequate | Adult Baby Elroy | |
| 1990 | A Shock to the System | Robert "Bob" Benham | |
| 1991 | The Object of Beauty | Lawrence "Larry" Oates | |
| 1991 | Oscar | Aldo | |
| 1991 | The Runestone | Capt. Gregory Fanducci | |
| 1992 | Utz | Marius Fisher | |
| 1992 | Passed Away | Peter Syracusa | |
| 1994 | The Mask | Lt. Mitch Kellaway | |
| 1995 | Coldblooded | Steve | |
| 1996 | Pie in the Sky | Dad Dunlap | |
| 1996 | Infinity | Mel Feynman | |
| 1998 | Jerry and Tom | Stanley | |
| 1998 | Hi-Life | Minor | |
| 2000 | By Courier | N/A | Short Film; Director; Nominated – Academy Award for Best Live Action Short Film |
| 2000 | Passion of Mind | Dr. Peters | |
| 2000 | How to Kill Your Neighbor's Dog | Larry | |
| 2000 | Traffic | Attorney Michael Adler | |
| 2003 | Where Are They Now?: A Delta Alumni Update | Donald "Boon" Schoenstein | Video short |
| 2004 | King of the Corner | Leo Spivak | Also writer and director |
| 2009 | Love Conquers Paul | Mr. Feigenbaum | |
| 2010 | The Chosen One | Bob | |
| 2010 | White Irish Drinkers | Whitey | |
| 2011 | Sholem Aleichem: Laughing in the Darkness | Himself | |
| 2011 | We Bought a Zoo | Delbert McGinty | |
| 2013 | At Middleton | Boneyard Sims | |
| 2014 | The Walk | Alfred Foxman | Short |
| 2016 | American Pastoral | Lou Levov | |

=== Television ===
| Year | Title | Role | Notes |
|---|---|---|---|
| 1977 | M*A*S*H | Cpl. Igor Straminsky | 2 episodes |
| 1984 | American Playhouse | Richard M. Nixon | Episodes: "Concealed Enemies", Parts I-IV |
| 1984 | Ellis Island | Jacob Rubinstein | 3 episodes |
| 1985 | The Twilight Zone | Gus Rosenthal | Episode: "The Beacon/One Life, Furnished in Early Poverty" |
| 1986 | News at Eleven | Eric Ross | Television film |
| 1989 | American Masters | W. Eugene Smith | Episode: "W. Eugene Smith: Photography Made Difficult" |
| 1989 | Trying Times | Bill | Episode: "The Hit List" |
| 1992 | Middle Ages | Walter Cooper | 5 episodes |
| 1993 | Barbarians at the Gate | Peter Cohen | Television film |
| 1993 | Gypsy | Herbie | Television film |
| 1995 | The Infiltrator | Rabbi Cooper | Television film |
| 1995 | Mystery Dance | Alan Baker | Episode #1.1 |
| 1995 | An Element of Truth | Sidney Wiltz | Television film |
| 1996 | Law & Order | Jerold Dixon | Episode: "Deceit" |
| 1997 | North Shore Fish | Porker | Television film |
| 1997 | Face Down | Lieutenant Cooper (Coop) | Television film |
| 1998 | Seinfeld | James Kimbrough | Episode: "The Finale" |
| 1998 | The Baby Dance | Richard Luckman | Television film |
| 1998 | Scandalous Me: Jacqueline Susann Story | Irving Mansfield | Television film |
| 2000 | Sports Night | Jay Rydell | Episode: "The Cut Man Cometh" |
| 2001 | Bojangles | Marty Forkins | Television film |
| 2001 | The Beast | Ted Fisher | 6 episodes |
| 2001 | Bleacher Bums | Decker | Television film |
| 2001–2002 | The Sopranos | Assemblyman Ronald Zellman | 6 episodes |
| 2003 | Family Guy | Max Weinstein (voice) | Episode: "When You Wish Upon a Weinstein" |
| 2004 | Back When We Were Grownups | Zeb Davitch | Television film |
| 2004–2007 | Law & Order: Special Victims Unit | Chauncey Zeirko | 7 episodes |
| 2007 | Damages | George Moore / The Executive | 9 episodes |
| 2008 | Cashmere Mafia | Len Dinerstein | Episode: "Dog Eat Dog" |
| 2009 | Leverage | Peter Blanchard | Episode: "The Lost Heir Job" |
| 2009–2012 | The Good Wife | Judge Harvey Winter | 5 episodes |
| 2010–2011 | One Tree Hill | Dr. August Kellerman | 6 episodes |
| 2013–2014 | Dads | David Sachs | 19 episodes |
| 2015 | Sex & Drugs & Rock & Roll | Ted | Episode: "Supercalifragilisticjuliefriggingandrews" |
| 2015 | Show Me a Hero | Oscar Newman | 6 episodes |
| 2017–2019 | Unbreakable Kimmy Schmidt | Artie Goodman | 9 episodes |
| 2018 | Disjointed | Walter | 5 episodes |
| 2021 | Succession | Roger Pugh | |
| 2022 | Bull | Dr. Cohen | |
| 2023 | Extrapolations | Ben Zucker | |
| 2026 | Cupertino | Judge Stewart Hohnstein | |
