= Noc Walpurgi =

2015 Polish horror drama film

- Directed by: Marcin Bortkiewicz
- Cinematography: Andrzej Wojciechowski
- Production companies: Kosmos Production; PS Film Sebastian Petryk; Studio Dzwiekownia; MX35
- Release date: September 17, 2015 (Gdynia Polish Film Festival)
- Country: Poland
- Language: Polish

Noc Walpurgi (lit. 'Walpurgis Night') is a 2015 Polish horror drama film set on Walpurgis Night.

== Production ==
The film is based on a stage play and was produced in black and white.

== Plot ==
In Switzerland in 1969 a young French journalist visits an opera singer, walking into her changing room. He claims that he is only there to interview her, but his questions pull the diva towards painful memories and confessions of the Holocaust.

== Reception ==
Łukasz Maciejewski and Dagmara Romanowska of Onet gave it positive reviews. Krzysztof Połaski of Telemagazyn and Bartosz Staszczyszyn of Culture.pl did as well.

== See also ==
- Holiday horror
