= Ben Coccio =

American film director

- Born: Benjamin Coccio; August 2, 1975 (age 50); Niskayuna, New York, United States
- Education: Rhode Island School of Design
- Occupation: Filmmaker
- Years active: 2000-present
- Known for: Zero Day
- Notable work: Zero Day
- Children: 2

Benjamin Coccio (born August 2, 1975) is an American filmmaker from Niskayuna, New York. He is best known for his feature film work, directing Zero Day and co-writing The Place Beyond The Pines.

== Biography ==
Coccio attended the Rhode Island School of Design, graduating in 1997 with a BFA Film/Animation/Video.

Coccio's first directorial effort was the short film 5:45am, released in 2000 by IFC. His next project was Zero Day, a fictionalized account of two high-school teens who plan and then execute a violent attack on their peers inside their high school. The film was admittedly a study of the Columbine High School massacre, and the two characters bear much resemblance to the perpetrators Eric Harris and Dylan Klebold.

In 2003, Coccio received the award for Best Director at Slamdunk Film Festival, was nominated for an Independent Spirit Award, and was named one of MovieMaker's upcoming directors to watch for.

In 2005 he was awarded a Connecticut State Commission on Culture and Tourism Artist Fellowship Award in the category of Film and Video.

Coccio co-wrote The Place Beyond the Pines with director Derek Cianfrance, setting the story in his hometown of Schenectady, New York.

In 2015 Coccio narrated Part 5 of the Civilization V Battle Royale Mk. II - an event hosted by the Reddit community for the Civilization V Video Game.

== Filmography ==
- 5:45 AM (2000)
- Zero Day (2002)
- The Beginner
- The Place Beyond the Pines (2013) (writer, story by)
