= Albert Sixtus =

German writer

- Born: 12 May 1892; Hainichen, Saxony, Germany
- Died: 24 February 1960 (aged 67); Jena, Thuringia, Germany
- Occupation: Children's writer
- Years active: 1922–1951

Albert Sixtus (12 May 1892 – 24 February 1960) was a German children's writer. During a career spanning almost thirty years, Sixtus wrote over 100 books, including fairytales, picture books, young adult fiction and a book of poems.

He is best known for his 1924 book Die Häschenschule (A Day At Bunny School), which was adapted into the 2017 animated film Rabbit School – Guardians of the Golden Egg. "Rabbit School" was translated into English by Roland Freischlad and published in 2009 after an agreement with the Boston publisher David R. Godine.

The Albert Sixtus Archive (German: Albert-Sixtus-Archiv) was created in 1997 in order to preserve his legacy and his work.

== Bibliography ==
Sixtus' bibliography, according to the Albert Sixtus Archive:

- Mein Guckkästchen, illustrated by Georg Hinke. Berlin-Charlottenburg: Jugend-Verlag 1922.
- Brummerchen, illustrated by Georg Hinke. Berlin: Jugend-Verlag 1923.
- Die wilden Jungen von der Feuerburg, illustrated by A.v.Riesen. Berlin-Charlottenburg: Jugend-Verlag 1923.
- Die Häschenschule (picture book), illustrated by Fritz Koch-Gotha. Leipzig: Alfred Hahn’s Verlag 1924.
- Das Muckhäslein (picture book), illustrated by Adelheid Schimz. Leipzig: Hegel & Schade 1924.
- Lerne was, so kannst du was! (picture book), illustrated by Fritz Baumgarten. München: Verlag J.F.Schreiber Esslingen 1924.
- Im Mäusehäuschen (picture book), illustrated by Hans James Berthold. Leipzig: Hegel & Schade 1924. 1929.
- Gute Freunde (picture book), illustrated by Karl Rohr. München: Verlag J.F.Schreiber Esslingen 1924.
- Neue Abenteuer von der Feuerburg, illustrated by A.v.Riesen. Berlin-Charlottenburg: Jugend-Verlag 1925.
- Der Wolkenkönig, illustrated by Ernst Liebermann. Reutlingen: Ensslin & Laiblin 1925.
- Allerlei Lustiges (picture book), illustrated by Bruno Grimmer. München: Verlag J.F.Schreiber Esslingen 1925.
- Im Heinzelmännchenreiche (picture book), illustrated by Eberhard Wilm. Görlitz: Verlagsanstalt Görlitzer Nachrichten und Anzeiger 1925.
- Im Katzenkränzchen (picture book), illustrated by Carl Robert Arthur Thiele. Leipzig: Alfred Hahn’s Verlag 1926.
- Im wunderbaren Puppenland (picture book), illustrated by Ernst Kutzer. Leipzig: Alfred Hahn’s Verlag 1926.
- Nach Regen folgt Sonnenschein (picture book), illustrated by Fritz Baumgarten. München: J.F.Schreiber Verlag 1926.
- Schniepapo, der Zaubermeister und die kleinen Schulhausgeister. Leipzig: Arwed Strauch 1927, ebenso separates Regiebuch.
- Knecht Ruprechts Weihnachtsbäckerei. In: Neue Leipziger Zeitung 1927.
- Wie Heini der Stärkste wurde (picture book), illustrated by Carl Robert Arthur Thiele. Leipzig: Leipziger Graphische Werke 1927.
- Wie Susi die Schönste wurde (picture book). illustrated by Carl Robert Arthur Thiele. Leipzig: Leipziger Graphische Werke 1927.
- Wir kleinen Handwerksleut (picture book), illustrated by Fritz Bergen. Leipzig: Leipziger Graphische Werke 1927.
- Bubis Tagewerk (picture book), illustrated by A.Erbert. Leipzig: Leipziger Graphische Werke 1927.
- Familie Dackelbein in der Großstadt (picture book), illustrated by Margarete Schneider-Reichel. Leipzig: Verlag E.Skacel 1927.
- Der Dackelschutzmann (picture book), illustrated by Ernst Kutzer. Leipzig: Leipziger Graphische Werke 1927.
- Der Zuckertütenbaum (picture book), illustrated by Richard Heinrich. Leipzig: Hegel & Schade 1928 bis 1943.
- Grünbart, das Moosmännchen (picture book), illustrated by Else Wenz-Viëtor. Oldenburg: Gerhard Stalling 1928.
- Die Zwergeisenbahn (picture book), illustrated by Ernst Kutzer. Leipzig: Hegel & Schade 1928.
- Der faule Teddybär (picture book), illustrated by Willy Planck. Stuttgart: Loewes Verlag 1928.
- Das lustige Kasperle-Buch (picture book), illustrated by Helmut Skarbina. Oldenburg: Gerhard Stalling Oldenburg 1928.
- Ei, die lustigen Teddybären (picture book), illustrated by Rudi Bär. Reutlingen: Ensslin & Laiblin 1928.
- Beim Puppenmütterchen. Leipzig: Gustav Richter 1928.
- Ulkige Sachen zum Tränenlachen. Leipzig: A.Strauch 1928.
- Weihnachten im Puppenhaus. Leipzig: Gustav Richter 1928.
- Die Wundereisenbahn im Weihnachtswalde. Leipzig: Arwed Strauch 1929.
- Vom Häslein und der Hennenfrau (picture book), illustrated by Rudi Bär. Fürth: Verlag Hesse 1928.
- Geburtstag im Kaninchenland (picture book), illustrated by Rudi Bär. Fürth: Verlag Hesse 1928. 2. Auflage: Geburtstag im Häschenland
- Jahrmarkt im Froschland (picture book), illustrated by Rudi Bär. Fürth: Verlag Hesse 1928.
- Vom Hündchen und vom Kätzchen (picture book), illustrated by Rudi Bär. Fürth: Verlag Hesse 1928.
- Möpschen hat Zahnschmerzen (picture book), illustrated by Helmut Skarbina. Oldenburg: Gerhard Stalling 1928.
- Baumkindleins Nachtfahrt (picture book), illustrated by Richard Heinrich. Reutlingen: Ensslin & Laiblin 1929.
- Liese auf der Märchenwiese. Leipzig: Gustav Richter 1929.
- Klipper, Klapper. Leichte Gedichte für kleine Wichte. Halle: C.Marhold 1929.
- Schaut herein – das ist fein (picture book), illustrated by Hans Greinke. Leipzig: Leipziger Graphische Werke 1929.
- Die Wunderfahrt (picture book), illustrated by Sándor Bortnyik. Leipzig: Alfred Hahn’s Verlag 1929.
- Ferienabenteuer der Feuerburgjungen, illustrated by A.v.Riesen. Berlin-Charlottenburg: Jugend-Verlag 1929.
- Der Hundezirkus (picture book), illustrated by Fritz Baumgarten. Leipzig: A. Anton & Co. 1930.
- Der Häschen-Spaziergang (picture book), illustrated by Richard Heinrich. Leipzig: A. Anton & Co. 1930. Esslinger 2004 under the title Der Häschen-Schulausflug.
- Hansis Reise ins Spielzeugland (picture book), illustrated by Richard Heinrich. Leipzig A. Anton & Co. 1930.
- Kikeriki (picture book), illustrated by Ernst Kutzer. Leipzig: Leipziger Graphische Werke 1930.
- Das Püppchen aus dem Ei (picture book), illustrated by Rudolf Schulz und Max Brösel. München, J.F.Schreiber Verlag Esslingen 1930.
- Das Blumenelfchen (picture book), illustrated by Fritz Baumgarten. Leipzig: Abel & Müller 1930.
- Die beiden Ausreißer (Geschichten für die Jugend), illustrated by Carl Robert Arthur Thiele. Hildesheim: Borgmeyer 1931.
- Schützenfest in Katzenhausen (picture book), illustrated by Carl Robert Arthur Thiele. Leipzig: Alfred Hahn’s Verlag 1933.
- Susel will nicht in die Schule gehen. Leipzig: Arwed Strauch 1933.
- Die kleinen, tapferen Eierzwerge (picture book), illustrated by Richard Heinrich. Leipzig: H.Schaufuß KG 1935.
- Im Schmetterlingsreich (picture book), illustrated by Sibylle von Olfers. München: J.F.Schreiber Verlag Esslingen 1935.
- Die Waldschule (picture book), illustrated by Fritz Baumgarten. Leipzig: A.Anton & Co. 1935.
- Die Fahrt ins Wunderland (picture book), illustrated by Fritz Baumgarten. Leipzig: A. Anton 1935.
- Mitgemacht! Spielt und lacht!. Leipzig: Arwed Strauch 1936.
- Der Frühling ist da (picture book), illustrated by Fritz Baumgarten. Leipzig: A. Anton & Co., 1936.
- Hopdiquax (picture book), illustrated by Vici Vago. Leipzig: A.Anton 1936.
- Familie Igels Wochenende (picture book), illustrated by Fritz Baumgarten. Leipzig: A. Anton 1936.
- Sportfest im Walde (picture book), illustrated by Fritz Baumgarten. Leipzig: A. Anton 1936.
- Auerbachs Deutscher Kinderkalender Leipzig: Verlag von Auerbachs Deutschem Kinderkalender. 1936.
- Das Geheimnis des Riesenhügels, illustrated by Richard Heinrich. Berlin: Globus Verlag GmbH 1941.
- Mein schöner kleiner Garten (picture book), illustrated by Elfriede Prasse. Berlin-München: Franz Schneider 1943.
- Die Höhlenmännlein (picture book), illustrated by Hanna Helwig-Goerke. Nürnberg: Sebaldus Verlag 1944.
- Die Zwergen-Feuerwehr (picture book), illustrated by Richard Heinrich. Dresden: Zwinger-Verlag Rudolf Glöß o. J. 1944.
- Kasperle-Kalender, illustrated by Richard Heinrich. Leipzig: Verlag Volk und Buch 1947.
- Hick und Hack (picture book), illustrated by Richard Heinrich. Dresden: Ehlermann 1947. Dresden: Walter Flechsig 1947.
- Das (zerstörte) Zwergenstädtchen (picture book), illustrated by Hanna Helwig-Goerke. Nürnberg: Sebaldus Verlag 1949.
- Die Gespenstermühle in der Silberschlucht, illustrated by Walter Rieck. Stuttgart: Kreuz 1951.
- Vorwiegend heiter. München: Herbert Post Presse 1966.
- Wir närrischen Menschen. Obercunnersdorf: Albert Sixtus Archive 2004.
