= Else Wenz-Viëtor =

German children's book illustrator and artist (1882–1973)

Else Wenz-Viëtor (30 April 1882 – 29 May 1973) was a German children's book illustrator and artist. She illustrated around 150 books in her lifetime, and was considered the most famous picture book illustrator in 1920s and 1930s Germany. Later on in her life, her work was viewed as controversial due to her participation in the Nazi Party in Germany.

She illustrated both picture books and fairy tales. In addition to her work in children's literature, she was a painter, artisan, and interior designer. She published under both of her married names: Else Rehm-Viëtor and Else Wens-Viëtor.

== Early life and education ==
Else Viëtor was born on 30 April 1882 in Sorau, Niederlausit, now in modern-day Poland. An orphan, she was raised by her grandparents in Freiburg im Breisgau. She received private lessons for painting, then studied at the School of Applied Arts in Munich in 1901, before continuing her studies at the Münchner Frauenakademie (Munich Women's Academy). She also studied privately under artists Angelo Jank and Heinrich Knirr.

She became a professional freelance artist after her participation in competitions held by Faber-Castell. She also spent time making art at Café Stefanie, a popular bohemian meeting place in Munich.

== Career and later life ==
Wenz-Vietor began working on children's books in 1903, when she was commissioned to create illustrations for the publisher Teubner in Leipzig. That year, she married the painter Karl Rehm and had a son, Harald. Starting in 1908, she designed home goods for the company Deutsche Werkstätten. There, she designed rooms, furniture, glass and porcelain plateware, lamps, jewelry, textiles, and wallpaper. She continued to work in the field of furniture design and interior design in the 1910s. During this time, she published her work under the name Else Rehm-Viëtor.

Wenz-Vietor continued working on children's books, and began to illustrate for the publishing company Alfred Hahn in 1909. In 1913, Else and Karl Rehm divorced. She remarried that year to the architect Paul Wenz, which is when she started publishing under the name Else Wenz-Vietor.

Through the 1920s and 1930s, she illustrated books for the Gerhard Stalling publishing house. She worked on fairy tale books, including Das Schlaraffenland (1923, translated as The Land of Milk and Honey), Märchen-Ostern (1927, translated as An Easter Fairy Tale), and Das grosse Märchenbuch (1957, translated as The Great Fairy Tale Book). She also wrote for picture books. She created multiple editions of a slot book in the 1920s, titled Nürnberger Puppenstubenspielbuch (translation: "Nuremberg dollhouse game book"). The books allowed for illustrated characters to be slotted into various areas of the picture book. Her work gradually began to be seen more in North America by the mid-1930s.

During Nazi Germany, she headed the Icking Nazi women's group beginning in 1933 and she was loyal to the Nazi regime. After World War II, she and her husband went through denazification, and her husband's family home in Icking was confiscated by the United States Army. She lived very privately after that with her husband until her death.

Wenz-Vietor was active in her career until the 1960s. She died in Icking on 29 May 1973. Her work in modern times has become controversial due to her participation in the Nazi regime.

== Artwork ==
Wenz-Vietor's work was originally inspired by the Jugendstil art movement in Germany. She later moved on from this style to making more realistic work. She used bright colors for her artwork, and worked with a variety of materials. According to the decorative art museum Kunstgewerbemuseum Berlin, her work is characterized by its use of symmetry and dynamic lines.

Arthur Rackham was one of her artistic inspirations, and her style of illustration has been compared to that of Rackham's.
