= The Christmas Season Massacre =

2001 film by Jeremy Wallace

- DVD released by Sub Rosa Extreme
- Directed by: Jeremy Wallace
- Written by: Eric Stanze; Jeremy Wallace
- Produced by: Mark W. Kettler; Jeremy Wallace
- Starring: Chris Belt; Joy Payne; Kyokai Lee; Julie Farrar; Eric Stanze; D.J. Vivona; Michael Hill; David Dunn; Jason Christ; William Clifton; Michael Wallace; Melissa Wallace
- Cinematography: Todd Tevlin
- Edited by: Eric Stanze
- Music by: Ven Rivoli
- Production companies: Fuzzy Devil Video; Sub Rosa Extreme
- Distributed by: Sub Rosa Studios
- Release date: December 2001 (United States)
- Running time: 70 minutes
- Country: United States
- Language: English

The Christmas Season Massacre is a 2001 horror comedy film written and directed by Jeremy Wallace, and co-written by Eric Stanze.

== Plot ==
On Christmas Eve, sometime after a woman is disemboweled in the woods of Christmastown, California by a man dressed as a pirate, a couple drive to a field, which the man, Boom Boom, claims is where Tommy "Oneshoe" McGroo buries his victims, the people who used to bully him. Boom Boom tells his girlfriend, Kitty, that Tommy acquired his nickname when one of his shoes was stolen, and he could not afford another due to his family's poverty. Tommy asked for replacement footwear for Christmas, but instead got an eyepatch with a Christmas tree on it, since he idolized pirates. Driven insane by this, Tommy began murdering his tormentors, though most consider him an urban legend. After telling Tommy's story, Boom Boom goes to urinate, and has his testicles ripped off by Tommy, who then wounds Kitty. Later, Tommy snaps the neck of man having kinky sex with his blindfolded wife, who Tommy then rapes.

At Lame Dog Hollow Camp, Tommy's remaining former classmates are assembled by Ernie Cunningham, who wants them to team-up to kill Tommy when he inevitably comes looking for them. Until then, the group members spend their time trying to amuse themselves, with amateur guitarist Isaac Hiltzik (who only talk sings) and his girlfriend, Lana Hooper, heading to the nearby lake, where Tommy knifes them. The next to die is awkward nerd Dorcas Cunningham, who Tommy sneaks up on with a running chainsaw, only being noticed when he steps on a twig.

After the sultry Abby Honeydew is stabbed while looking for their missing friends, Ernie and Danny make plans to try and summon Tommy's previous victims with a Ouija board, but Ernie is killed with a screwdriver while traversing a cemetery. Danny fights Tommy, and stabs him in the head with a rail spike, though Tommy recovers from this, blasts Danny with a shotgun, and takes one of his shoes. Five years later, Tommy (who still has the spike protruding from his head) is shown to have married the woman he had sex with, and the two have a son, who Tommy gives his eyepatch to as a Christmas present.

== Cast ==
- D.J. Vivona as Ernie Campbell
- Jason Christ as Dorcas Cunningham
- Chris Belt as Danny Carpenter
- Michael Hill as Tommy "Oneshoe" McGroo
- Joy Payne as Abby Honeydew
- Michael Wallace as Isaac Hiltzik
- Melissa Wallace as Lana Hooper
- Eric Stanze as Boom Boom/Clarence Melvin Schnortstein
- Kyokai Lee as Kinky Wife
- William Clifton as Kinky Husband
- David Dunn as Frightened Driver
- Julie Farrar as Kitty Olen
- Jamie Sandler as Gutted Victim
- Jake Wallace as Little Oneshoe McGroo
- Lisa Anne Harness as Radio Voice
- Billy Kryptonite as Hank

== Reception ==
The film was labeled "Mostly silly in a bad way, but worth a couple of chuckles if you're bored" by The Worldwide Celluloid Massacre. Digital Retribution found the film boring and mostly unfunny, concluding "As a holiday movie it's virtually worthless, and as a comedy/slasher it's not much better".
