= Die Häschenschule =

1924 children's book by Albert Sixtus

Die Häschenschule or A Day At Bunny School is a 1924 German children's book written by Albert Sixtus and illustrated by Fritz Koch-Gotha.

== Plot ==
Written in rhyme, the novel tells the tale of young rabbits going to school to learn good manners, how to paint Easter Eggs, how to identify plants, and how to elude foxes and other dangers.

== Toys ==
Children's toys of Rabbit Schools have been made in hollowcast metal, tin, wood and plastic.

== Film ==
A 2017 animated film inspired by the book Die Häschenschule: Jagd nach dem goldenen Ei (English: Rabbit School - Guardians of the Golden Egg) was directed by Ute von Münchow-Pohl.
