= Rabbit School – Guardians of the Golden Egg =

2017 German animated film

Rabbit School - Guardians of the Golden Egg
- Poster
- German: Die Häschenschule – Jagd nach dem Goldenen Ei
- Directed by: Ute von Münchow-Pohl
- Screenplay by: Katja Grübel; Dagmar Rehbinder
- Based on: Die Häschenschule by Albert Sixtus
- Produced by: Dirk Beinhold
- Edited by: Erik Stappenbeck
- Music by: Alex Komlew
- Production company: Akkord Film Produktion GmbH
- Distributed by: Universum Film; Sola Media
- Release date: 16 March 2017
- Running time: 76 minutes
- Country: Germany
- Language: German
- Box office: $3,416,299

Rabbit School – Guardians of the Golden Egg (German: Die Häschenschule – Jagd nach dem Goldenen Ei) is a 2017 German animated adventure comedy film directed by Ute von Münchow-Pohl from a screenplay by Katja Grübel and Dagmar Rehbinder, based on the 1924 German children's novel Die Häschenschule (A Day At Bunny School), written by Albert Sixtus and illustrated by Fritz Koch-Gotha. The film had its world premiere at the 67th Berlin International Film Festival in February 2017, and was released theatrically in Germany on 16 March 2017. It grossed $3,416,299 worldwide.

== Plot ==
Max, a young urban rabbit struggling with his identity, gets stuck in an old-fashioned Easter Rabbit school after it is surrounded by a clan of malicious foxes who want to take over the holiday. With the help of his crush Emmy and the instruction of the mysterious Madame Hermione, Max must learn the secret of the magic of the Easter bunnies and save the school from the evil foxes.

== Cast ==
=== German version ===
- Noah Levi as Max
- Friedrich von Thun as Mr Fritz
- Senta Berger as Madame Hermione
- Jenny Melina Witez as Emmy
- Max Boguth as Ernie
- Ben Boxberg as Anton
- Jule Böwe as Ruth
- Dirk Petrick as Ferdinand
- Constantin von Jascheroff as Bruno
- Tim Sander as Lawrence
- Sebastian Fitzner as A.C.
- Leon Seidel as Ron
- Peter Nottmeier as Willibald
- Valentina Bonalana as Luise
- Gustav Häcke: Ruddy
- Max Rinke as Otto
- Tom Raczko as Leader of Shockwave Rabbits
- David Trayser as Techno Rabbit
- Lina Andres as Little Rabbit Girl
- Anna Neuenhofen as Sales Woman / Mother on TV / News Anchoress
- Erik Stappenbeck as News Anchor

=== English version ===
- Gustav Bergold as Max
- Darren Smith as Mr Fritz
- Dulcie Smart as Madame Hermine
- Jenny Melina Witez as Emmi
- Lawrence Smith as Ernie
- Sammy Holroyd as Anton
- Corey Ott: Ruth
- Harvey Friedman as Ferdinand
- Steve Jacob as Bruno
- Jeff Burrell as Lawrence / News Anchor
- Liam Mockridge as A.C.
- Flynn Ott as Ron
- Marc Espiner as Willibald
- Imogen Burrell as Luise
- Laszlo Jansen as Ruddy / Otto
- Neally Quinn as Leader
- Lonja Siebenmann as Techno Rabbit
- Riley Ott as Little Rabbit Girl
- Vinh Pham as Mother on TV
- Susanne Ritter as Sales Woman / News Anchoress

== Release ==
Rabbit School had its world premiere at the 67th Berlin International Film Festival in February 2017, and was released theatrically in Germany on 16 March 2017, distributed by Universum Film. During its opening week in Germany, the film received 103,518 admissions, and grossed a total of $1,603,605 during its entire German theatrical run, contributing to the worldwide gross of $3,416,299. International sales were handled by Sola Media.

== Sequel ==
A sequel, titled Rabbit Academy: Mission Eggpossible, was released on digital platforms on March 17, 2022.
