= Sabrina Dickens =

British actress and model

- Born: Sabrina Dickens; Bristol, England, UK
- Occupation: Actress

Sabrina Dickens is a former British actress best known for her dual role as Reiga and Celine in My Lonely Me and leading role in Is This Now. She now pursues another career working in childcare. In 2011, she launched her career with supporting roles in a number of independent films.

== Theatre ==
- Grand Guignol, by Richard Hand as Helen Abertoir.
- A Life Time On Tip Toes, by Dominique Fester as Ensemble Chapter Arts Centre.

== Filmography ==
=== Films ===
Year	Title	Role	Notes
2012	Night of the Living Dead: Resurrection	Bonnie	
2013	Forgotten Lands	Avelina	
2013	The Better Man	Kayleigh	
2013	Silent Night, Bloody Night: The Homecoming	Marianne Butler	
2013	How I live Now	Guerilla Soldier Girlfriend	
2014	MENU	Clare	Short Film
2014	Two Cousins One House & Edmond	Tara	Television Movie
2015	Skin Traffik	Trafficked Girl	
2014	B33F	Zoe	
2015	My Lonely Me	Reiga / Celine	
2015	Deadman Apocalypse	Young Alba	
2015	Granny of the Dead	Ceri	
2015	Cruel Summer	Lisa	
2016	Is This Now	Ingrid	
2018	Communists	Connie	
2018	Tick & The Bomb	Julie	
2019	2032	Kate	

== Awards and nominations ==
Year	Association	Category	Nominated work	Result	
2017	World Music & Independent Film Festival	Best Actress in a Feature Film	Is This Now		
Nominated	2015	Accolade Global Film Festival	Award of Recognition: Best Leading Actress	My Lonely Me	Won
2015	International Independent Film Awards	Best Leading Actress	My Lonely Me	Won	
2015	World Music & Independent Film Festival	Best Actress in a Feature Film	My Lonely Me	Nominated	
