= Silent Night, Bloody Night: The Homecoming =

- Cover artwork
- Directed by: James Plumb
- Produced by: Andrew Jones
- Starring: Adrienne King; Alan Humphreys; Mel Stevens; Sabrina Dickens; Philip Harvey
- Music by: James Morrissey
- Production company: North Bank Entertainment
- Release date: 10 June 2013
- Running time: 85 minutes
- Country: United Kingdom
- Language: English

Silent Night, Bloody Night: The Homecoming is a 2013 British slasher film and remake of the 1972 American film Silent Night, Bloody Night.

== Plot ==
Jeffrey inherits his grandfather's abandoned home and arrives in town to negotiate its sale. No one knows an ax-wielding maniac lives in the house and does not like strangers.

== Cast ==
- Adrienne King as the mysterious voice
- Alan Humphreys as Jeffrey Butler
- Mel Stevens as Diane Adams
- Sabrina Dickens as Marianne Butler
- Philip Harvey as Wilfred Butler

== See also ==
- Silent Night, Bloody Night 2: Revival, sequel to the original film
