= Mercy Christmas =

- Directed by: Ryan Nelson
- Screenplay by: Ryan Nelson; Beth Levy Nelson
- Produced by: Beth Levy Nelson; Ryan Nelson; Tarquin Alexander; Everardo Goyanes
- Cinematography: Kenneth Neil Moore; Ryan Nelson
- Edited by: Matt Evans
- Music by: Mark Leonard; Chris Bills; Daniel Lepervanche
- Production companies: No Mercy Pictures; Other Paw Films
- Distributed by: Gravitas Ventures
- Release date: November 28, 2017
- Running time: 83 minutes
- Country: United States
- Language: English

Mercy Christmas is a 2017 American christmas comedy horror film, written by Ryan Nelson and Beth Levy Nelson and directed by Ryan Nelson. The film was acquired by Gravitas Ventures in 2017 and was released on November 28, 2017.

== Plot ==
Michael Briskett thinks that he meets the perfect woman, his Christmas dream comes true when she invites him to her family's holiday celebration. However, Michael struggles to survive once he realises that he will be the Christmas dinner.

== Cast ==
- Steven Hubbell as Michael Briskett
- Cole Gleason as Andy Robillard
- Whitney Nielsen as Katherine
- Casey O'Keefe as Cindy Robillard
- D.J. Hale as Eddie
- Ryan Boyd as Bart Robillard
- David Ruprecht as Abe Robillard
- Gwen Van Dam as Granny
- Dakota Shephard as Denise
- Joey Keane as Phillip

== Production and release ==
Mercy Christmas was produced by No Mercy Pictures in collaboration with Other Paw Films. The film is Nelson's debut directorial feature. Filming was completed in Los Angeles during 2016, and traditional special-effects makeup was used to create the gory scenes. The film was acquired by Gravitas Ventures in August 2017 and premiered at the Shriekfest Film Festival in Los Angeles in October 2017.

It was released on VOD on November 28, 2017.

== Reception ==
The film received positive critical reviews from multiple media outlets following its premiere. Dread Central described it as “without a doubt, among the best the sub-genre [comedy-horror] has to offer.” Horror Freak News called it a “new holiday horror classic." Ink and Code stated: "It might have been the most I've laughed during a horror movie. Or maybe the most revolted I’ve been during a comedy. From the start, it establishes its own bizarre tone and fully commits to it for the rest of the film. It is thoroughly surreal as it oscillates from gut-busting laughs to wince-inducing violence." Film Stage acknowledged its efficacy in the sub-genre of comedy-horror, saying, "Nelson effectively mixes genre tropes with the mundane life of an office worker. He combines a psychological horror scenario (office work futility) that's ripe with humor and a graphic horror aesthetic (prisoners of a cannibalistic clan) to embrace the absurdity inherent to both."

== Awards and nominations ==
In 2017, Mercy Christmas won the Best Kill Award at the Sin City Horror Festival in Las Vegas, Nevada and was nominated for the Best Comedy Award at the Buffalo Dreams Fantastic Film Festival in Buffalo, New York.
