= Deadly Little Christmas =

- DVD cover.
- Directed by: Novin Shakiba
- Screenplay by: Jeremiah Campbell
- Story by: David S. Serling
- Produced by: David S. Serling
- Starring: Felissa Rose
- Cinematography: Orestes Gonzales
- Edited by: Jason Peri
- Music by: Jason Peri
- Production company: Sterling Home Entertainment
- Distributed by: Razor Digital Entertainment
- Release date: 2009
- Running time: 80 minutes
- Country: United States
- Language: English

Deadly Little Christmas is a 2009 direct-to-video horror film directed by Novin Shakiba, and written by Jeremiah Campbell.

== Plot ==
On Christmas Day, a young boy named Devin Merriman is institutionalized after being found covered in blood and clutching a knife, having apparently murdered his father and the housekeeper after walking in on the two of them having sex. Fifteen years later, Devin escapes, just as a figure in a red mask begins committing a series of seemingly random murders, the victims including two teenagers, an elderly person, and a pair of police officers.

After a Christmas Eve play headed by Devin's sisters, Taylor and Noel, is finished at the community centre, Noel's boyfriend Steve is killed. The next morning, the Merriman sisters receive a call from their mother, who demands they come to the community centre. Concerned with their mother's odd behavior as of late, the girls call the police before heading out. Arriving at the centre first is Detective Hughes, who is confronted and stabbed by the hysterical Mrs. Merriman. When Taylor and Noel arrive, they find the bodies of all the recent victims seated at a table in a mockery of The Last Supper, and their mother and Devin, the latter claiming that Mrs. Merriman is the killer of their father and everyone else, and that she framed him due to being a misandrist; the girls at first refuse to believe Devin, until they notice the blood coating their mother's arms. When Mrs. Merriman pulls out a knife, Devin disarms her, but she manages to grab Detective Hughes's dropped gun. Before Mrs. Merriman can fire it, Taylor wrestles the gun away from her, and shoots her in the head when she charges forward.

== Cast ==
- Barbara Jean Barrielle as Margaret
- Charlotte Barrielle as Young Taylor Merriman
- Anthony Campanello as Steve
- Eric Fischer as Detective Hughes
- Manuel A. Ruiz Garcia as Orderly
- Noa Geller as Inga
- Leah Grimsson as Noel Merriman
- Patrick Heng as Dead Orderly
- Samuel Nathan Hoffmire as Devin Merriman
- Kaypri as Nurse
- Grant Keledjian as Zack
- Monique La Barr as Taylor Merriman
- Alan Morataya as Joel
- Jay Moreno as Security Officer Tom
- Douglas Myers as Mr. Merriman
- Lynne Newton as Mrs. Quinn
- Felissa Rose as Mary Merriman
- Jed Rowen as Security Officer Harold
- Scarlett Shae as Young Noel Merriman
- Shane Carther Thomas as Young Devin Merriman
- Emery Wheeler as Play Actor

== Reception ==
Deadly Little Christmas has been met with widespread disdain by critics, who complained about the poor performances, plodding storyline, weak cinematography and derivative plot.
