= List of films set around Father's Day =

This is a list of films set on or around Father's Day.

== Crime ==
- Underworld (1996) - an American mob film in which a mobster attempts to solve his father's murder and settle scores on Father's Day

== Drama ==
- Jam (2006), an American film about how various characters spend Father's Day

== Horror ==
- "Father's Day" (1982), a segment of the horror anthology film Creepshow in which a father is killed by his daughter on Father's Day
- Stepfather III (1992), an American slasher film that begins on Easter Sunday and ends on Father's Day
- Father's Day (2011), an American-Canadian action-horror comedy film featuring a character known as the Father's Day Killer
- Knock Knock (2015), an American horror film in which a man stays home alone on Father's Day weekend
- "Father's Day" (2016), a segment of the American horror anthology film Holidays

== See also ==
- List of films set around Mother's Day
