= List of films set around May Day =

This is a list of films set on or around May Day.

== Adventure ==
- First Knight (1995) - American Arthurian adventure film in which Guinevere rides out on May Day

== Animated ==
- Lilo & Stitch 2: Stitch Has a Glitch (2005) - Disney film about a hula competition in a May Day festival
- Howl's Moving Castle (film) (2004) - Studio Ghibli film which begins during a May Day celebration

== Comedy ==
- On the Green Carpet (2001) - North Korean romantic comedy about the May Day mass games

== Drama ==
- The Assassination of Trotsky (1972) - British film that begins with a May Day celebration in Mexico City
- The First of May (1998) - Joe DiMaggio's last film
- Maytime (1923) - American silent romantic drama, based on the Broadway musical
- Maytime (1937) - musical remake of the 1923 film
- The Unbearable Lightness of Being (1988) - American adaptation of the 1984 novel of the same name, featuring a May Day ceremony
- Zero Day (2003) - American film inspired by the Columbine High School massacre

== Historical ==
- Salvatore Giuliano (1962) - Italian film depicting the 1947 May Day massacre of Sicilian communists by gangsters

== Horror ==
- The Wicker Man (1973) - British horror film about a pagan May Day celebration
- The Wicker Man (2006) - American remake of the 1973 film
- The Wicker Tree (2011) - sequel to the 1973 British film
- Midsommar (2019) - A24 drama where American tourists visit a Swedish solstice celebration.

== Thriller ==
- Tinker Tailor Soldier Spy (2011) - British Cold War espionage film adaptation of the 1974 John le Carré novel, featuring a May Day celebration in Berlin in 1969
