= Slamdunk Film Festival =

The Slamdunk Film Festival was a "counter-festival" in Park City, Utah, held during and, as an alternative to, the Sundance Film Festival from 1998 to 2003. It was forced out of existence in 2003 by Park City officials along with several other alternative festivals (Slumdance Film Festival and Nodance Film Festival). Prior to this, it had hosted screenings at Cannes and Toronto during the film festivals there.
