= List of films set around Mother's Day =

This is a list of films set on or around Mother's Day.

== Comedy ==
- Mother's Day (1993), an Austrian comedy film about a Viennese family preparing for Mother's Day
- Mother's Day (2016), an American romantic comedy film in which various people's lives intersect on Mother's Day
- Parking (2008), a Taiwanese black comedy set on Mother's Day in Taipei

== Drama ==
- Going Shopping (2005), a romantic drama film about a clothing designer selling her shop's inventory in a sale over Mother's Day weekend

== Horror ==
- Mother's Day (1980), a slasher film
- Mother's Day (2010), a loose remake of the 1980 film
- Mother's Day, a segment of the 2016 horror anthology film Holidays
- Shaun of the Dead (2004), a British zombie comedy film directed by Edgar Wright

== See also ==
- List of films set around Father's Day
