= List of Thanksgiving television specials =

The following is a list of Thanksgiving television specials in the United States and Canada. Unless otherwise stated, these are episodes of established television series or one-off specials that are rerun annually.

Events not specifically made for television (e.g. parades, theatrical films, unscripted sporting events) are not included in this list; professional wrestling pay-per-view specials, because they are scripted and made primarily for television, are included in this list.

== Children's/family ==
- Adventures from the Book of Virtues: Generosity (1997)
- Allegra's Window: Mitten Weather (1995)
- Alvin and the Chipmunks: A Chipmunk Celebration (1994)
- Amphibia: The Big Bugball Game (2019)
- Angela Anaconda: No Thanksgiving (2000)
- Animaniacs: Turkey Jerky (1993)
- Annoying Orange:
  - "Gobble Gobble!" (2016)
  - "PilGRIM Reaper" (2017)
  - "Thanksgiving Can Stuff It!" (2018)
  - "Turkey Jerky!" (2019)
  - "Storytime: The 1st Thanksgiving!" (2022)
  - "STANKGIVING" (2025)
- As Told By Ginger: Ten Chairs (2004)
- B.C.: The First Thanksgiving (1973)
- Barbie: It Takes Two: Turkey Trouble (2022)
- Bear in the Big Blue House: The Best Thanksgiving Ever (1999)
- The Berenstain Bears: The Prize Pumpkin (2003)
- The Berenstain Bears Meet Bigpaw (1980)
- Big Nate: "NATESgiving (2024)
- Blue's Clues: Thankful (1999)
- Blue's Clues & You!: Thankful With Blue (2020)
- Bobby's World: Generics and Indians (1997)
- Bozo, Gar and Ray: WGN TV Classics (2005)
- Bubble Guppies: Gobble Gobble Guppies! (2014)
- Butterbean's Cafe: Fairy Happy Thanksgiving / Cricket's The Boss! (2018)
- Caillou: Caillou's Thanksgiving (2000)
- The Care Bears: Grams Bear's Thanksgiving Surprise (1986)
- Casper the Friendly Ghost: Do or Diet (1953)
- CatDog: Talking Turkey (1999)
- Clarence: Chadsgiving (2017)
- Craig of the Creek: Craig and the Kid's Table (2019)
- Cyberchase: Giving Thanks Day (2019)
- Daniel Tiger's Neighborhood: Thank You, Grandpere Tiger!/Neighborhood Thank You Day (2012)
- Davey and Goliath: The Pilgrim Boy (1962)
- Doctor Dolittle: The great turkey race (1970)
- Dora the Explorer: Dora's Thanksgiving Day Parade (2012)
- Doug: Doug's Thanksgiving (1997)
- The Emperor's New School: "Cornivale" (2008)
- The Fairly OddParents: Timmy Turnip (2009)
- Fluppy Dogs (1986)
- Garfield's Thanksgiving (1989)
- Get Rolling with Otis: The Thankful Parade / Hay Day Hay Maze (2021)
- Harriet the Spy: The Walrus and the Carpenter (2023)
- Harvey Beaks: Yampions (2015)
- Henry Hugglemonster: Huggsgiving Day (2013)
- Hey Arnold: Arnold's Thanksgiving (1998)
- The High Fructose Adventures of Annoying Orange: Thanksfornothing Day (2013)
- The Huckleberry Hound Show: Grim Pilgrim (1959)
- House of Mouse: House of Turkey (2003)
- Intergalactic Thanksgiving (1979)
- Jay Jay The Jet Plane: Snuffy's Thanksgiving (2001)
- Jerky Turkey (1945)
- JoJo's Circus: The Thanksgiving Hip-Hooray Parade (2005)
- Life with Louie (Season 1, Episode 9): The Fourth Thursday in November (1995)
- Loopy De Loop: Drum-Sticked (1963)
- MAD: Bourne Leg-a-Turkey/Pilgrimm (2012)
- Martha Speaks: Martha's Thanksgiving (2012)
- Maya & Miguel: The Best Thanksgiving Ever (2005)
- Megas XLR: Thanksgiving Throwdown (2004)
- Mickey Mouse Clubhouse: Mickey's Thanks a Bunch Day (2008)
- Mickey Mouse: Mixed-Up Adventures: Mickey's Thanksgiving Family Fun Race / Happy Thanksgiving Helpers! (2019)
- Minnie's Bow-Toons: Turkey Time (2014)
- The Mighty B: Thanksgiving Beeninactment (2008)
- Molly of Denali: Thanks-for-giving (2024)
- Moose and Zee: We're Thankful (2005)
- Mouse on the Mayflower (1968)
- The Muppet Show (Arlo Guthrie, 1979)
- My Gym Partner's a Monkey: A Thanksgiving Carol (2008)
- My Little Pony: Friends Are Never Far Away (2005)
- My Little Pony: Tell Your Tale: "Panic on Harvest and Hugs Day"
- Nick's Thanksgiving Fest (1989)
- Nina's World:
  - "Nina's Thanksgiving" (2016)
  - "The Thanksgiving Sharing Box" (2017)
- Pac-Man: The Animated Series: Happy Pacs-Giving (1983)
- PAW Patrol: Pups Save Thanksgiving (2018)
- PB&J Otter: "Thanks for the Giggle Melon" (2000)
- Peppa Pig: Thanksgiving (2024)
- Peppa Pig Tales: Happy Thanksgiving (2022)
- Pepper Ann: Thanksgiving Dad (1997)
- Pinkalicious & Peterrific: A Fairy Thanksgiving (2020)
- The Pink Panther: Pilgrim Panther (1993)
- Planet Sheen: Thanksgetting (2010)
- Pocoyo: You Are Welcome for Thanksgiving (2018)
- Popeye the Sailor: Pilgrim Popeye (1951)
- Pupstruction: Petsgiving At PawPaw’s (2024)
- Raw Toonage: Gobble Gobble Bonkers (1993)
- The Real Ghostbusters: The Revenge of Murray the Mantis (1987)
- Recess (Season 1, Episode 22): The Great Can Drive (1997)
- Regular Show: The Thanksgiving Special (2013)
- RoboGobo: Gimme Friendsgiving (2026)
- Rocko's Modern Life: Turkey Time/Floundering Fathers (1996)
- Sago Mini Friends: Happy Thankful Day (2022)
- Saturday Supercade: Q*bert: Thanksgiving For the Memories (1983)
- Shining Time Station: Billy's Party (1993)
- The Shnookums & Meat Funny Cartoon Show: What a Turkey! (1995)
- Skylanders Academy: Thankstaking For the Memories (2017)
- So Weird: "Earth 101" (2000)
- The Spectacular Spider-Man: Nature vs. Nurture (2008)
- Stanley: A Turkey of a Thanksgiving (2004)
- Steven Universe: Gem Harvest (2016)
- Sunny Bunnies: "Sunny Thanksgiving" (2019)
- Super Duper Bunny League: "The Gobbler!" (2025)
- SuperKitties: "Friendsgiving Feast" (2026)
- Tennessee Tuxedo and His Tales: The Romance of Plymouth Rock (1965)
- Teacher's Pet: The Turkey That Came to Dinner (2002)
- Teletubbies: Handshapes-Turkey (1999)
- Teletubbies Let's Go: A Very Special Meal/Noo-Noo Eats All The Tubby Custard (2023)
- Thanksgiving in the Land of Oz (1980)
- A Thanksgiving Tale (1983)
- The Thanksgiving That Almost Wasn't (1972)
- Thomas & Friends: "Thomas and Percy's Mountain Adventure" (1993)
- Toon Heads: Turkey Toons (1999)
- T.O.T.S.: Totsgiving (2020)
- Trolls: The Beat Goes On!: "Funsgiving" (2019)
- The Turkey Caper (1985)
- Turkey Hollow (2015)
- Underdog: Simon Says No Thanksgiving (1965)
- Wild Kratts: Happy Turkey Day (2012)
- The Wild Thornberrys: A Family Tradition (2000)
- Wordgirl: Guess Who's Coming to Thanksgiving Dinner (2014)
- WordWorld: Pig's Big Moonlight Feast (2007)

=== Arthur ===
- Francine's Pilfered Paper (2007)
- An Arthur Thanksgiving (2020)

=== Big City Greens ===
- Big Deal / Forbidden Feline (2018)
- Harvest Dinner (2019)
- Turkey Trouble (2024)

=== Clifford's Puppy Days ===
- Fall Feast (2005)
- But I Really, Really Saw It (2006)
- The Perfect Pancake (2006)

=== Looney Tunes ===
- Tom Turk and Daffy (1944)
- Holiday for Drumsticks (1949)
- Bugs Bunny's Thanksgiving Diet (1979/CBS)
- Daffy Duck's Thanks-for-Giving Special (1980/NBC)
- The Sylvester & Tweety Mysteries: Happy Pranksgiving (1997)
- New Looney Tunes: No Thanks Giving (2019)
- Looney Tunes Cartoons: Pilgwim's Pwogress (2022)

=== The Loud House/The Casagrandes ===
- The Loudest Thanksgiving (2018)
- The Loud House Thanksgiving Special (2022)
- The Casagrandes:
  - Cursed (2020)

=== Max & Ruby ===
- Max's Thanksgiving (2004)
- Max and Ruby Give Thanks (2012)

=== The Patrick Star Show ===
- Blorpsgiving (2023)
- Thanks But No Thanksgiving (2024)

=== Paw Patrol/Rubble & Crew ===
- Pups Save Thanksgiving / Pups Save a Windy Bay (2018)
- The Crew Celebrates BuilderCovegiving Day / The Crew Builds a Rocket Ship Ride (2024)

=== Peanuts (Charlie Brown) ===
- A Charlie Brown Thanksgiving (1973/CBS)
- This Is America, Charlie Brown: The Mayflower Voyagers (1988)
- Peanuts (TV series): Good Dog/Woodstock (2016)

=== Puppy Dog Pals ===
- Turkey on the Town / Friendship Feast (2019)
- Pups on Parade / Pop's Promise (2020)
- A Very Berry Friendship Feast / Nature Pillow Pups (2022)

=== Rugrats/All Grown Up ===
- The Turkey Who Came to Dinner (1997)
- R.V. Having Fun Yet? (2005)

=== Sesame Street ===
- Episode 4324: Trashgiving Day (2013)
- Episode 4801: A Sesame Street Thanksgiving (2017)
- Elmo's World: Thanksgiving (2017)

=== Strawberry Shortcake: Berry in the Big City ===
- Berry Bounty Banquet: Part One / Berry Bounty Banquet: Part Two (2021)
- Berry Bounty Bust (2023)

=== Teen Titans Go! ===
- Thanksgiving (2014)
- Black Friday (2015)
- Thanksgetting (2017)
- A Doom Patrol Thanksgiving (2021)
- Wishbone (2023)

=== The Tiny Chef Show ===
- Fwendsgiving (2023)
- Fwendsgiving Feast (2024)

=== Tom and Jerry ===
- The Little Orphan (1949)
- The Tom and Jerry Show: Turkey Tom (2021)

=== Winnie the Pooh ===
- Welcome to Pooh Corner: Pooh Corner Thanksgiving (1983)
- A Winnie the Pooh Thanksgiving (1998)
- Seasons of Giving (1999)
- My Friends Tigger & Pooh: Many Thanks for Christopher Robin (2007)

== Action/adventure series ==
- The A-Team: "Family Reunion" (1986)
- Alias: "Color Blind" (2001)
- Daniel Boone: "The Thanksgiving Story" (1965)
- The Incredible Hulk: "Homecoming" (1979)
- MacGyver: "The Outsiders" (1988)
- Mighty Morphin Power Rangers: Storybook Rangers (Parts 1 and 2) (1995) (Season 2, Episodes 48 & 49)
- The Young Indiana Jones Chronicles: "Peking, March 1910" (1993)

=== Chuck ===
- "Chuck Versus the Nemesis" (2007) (Season 1, Episode 10)
- "Chuck Versus the Gravitron" (2008) (Season 2, Episode 8)
- "Chuck Versus the Leftovers" (2010) (Season 4, Episode 10)

== American drama series ==
- 413 Hope St.: "Thanksgiving" (1997)
- The Agency: "Thanksgiving" (2002)
- Almost Family: "Thankful AF" (2019)
- American Playhouse: "The Star-Crossed Romance of Josephine Cosnowski" (1985)
- Apple's Way: "The Real Thanksgiving" (1974)
- Beauty & the Beast: "Guess Who's Coming to Dinner?" (2013)
- Blue Bloods: "Thanksgiving" (2011)
- Bones: "High Treason in the Holiday Season" (2015)
- Boston Legal: "Thanksgiving" (2008)
- Boston Public: "Chapter Five" (2000)
- Brothers & Sisters: "Just a Sliver" (2008)
- Castle: "The Good, The Bad And The Baby" (2013)
- The Chi: "Thanksgiving" (2024)
- Chicago Fire: "Two Families" (2012)
- Chicago Hope: "Tantric Turkey" (1998)
- Commander in Chief: "The Mom Who Came to Dinner" (2005)
- Dexter (Season 4, Episode 9): "Hungry Man" (2009)
- Dynasty: "Shoot from the Hip" (2019)
- Feud: Capote vs. The Swans: "Ice Water in Their Veins" (2024)
- Flipper: "Thanksgiving" (1998)
- Friday Night Lights: "Thanksgiving" (2010)
- Good Trouble: "Turkey for Me, Turkey for You" (2023)
- The Good Wife: "A Defense of Marriage" (2012)
- Hill Street Blues: "Low Blow" (1984)
- Homicide: Life on the Street: "Hate Crimes" (1995)
- House (Season 6, Episode 9): "Ignorance Is Bliss" (2009)
- I'll Fly Away: "Coming Home" (1991)
- Jericho: "Red Flag" (2006)
- Judging Amy: "The Persistence of Tectonics" (1999)
- The L Word: Generation Q: "Quality Family Time" (2023)
- Law & Order: Criminal Intent: "The War at Home" (2006)
- LAX: "Thanksgiving" (2004)
- Life Goes On: "A Thatcher Thanksgiving" (1990)
- Lipstick Jungle: "Chapter 16: Thanksgiving" (2008)
- Little House on the Prairie: "The Little House Years" (1979)
- My Own Worst Enemy: "High Crimes and Turducken" (2008)
- Now and Again: "Pulp Turkey" (1999)
- Ordinary Joe: "Thankful" (2021)
- Picket Fences: "Thanksgiving" (1992)
- Police Story: "Thanksgiving" (1976)
- The Resident: "Peking Duck Day" (2019)
- Reunion: "1992" (2005)
- Revenge: "Lineage" (2012)
- St. Elsewhere: "A Wing and a Prayer" (1983)
- Sisters: "Georgie Through the Looking Glass" (1991)
- The Sopranos: "He Is Risen" (2001)
- Spenser: For Hire: "Thanksgiving" (1987)
- Stumptown: "November Surprise" (2019)
- Third Watch: "History of the World" (1999)
- Thirtysomething: "We Gather Together" (1987)
- Trapper John, M.D.: "Thanks for Giving" (1982)
- Trauma: "Thank You" (2009)
- The Trials of Rosie O'Neill: "Rosie Gets the Blues" (1990)

=== 7th Heaven ===
- "Last Call for Aunt Julie" (1996)
- "Thanksgiving" (2004)
- "Turkey" (2005)
- "Thanks and Giving" (2006)

=== American Dreams ===
- "The End of the Innocence" (2002)
- "What Dreams May Come" (2004)

=== Dirty Sexy Money ===
- "The Country House" (2007)
- "The Facts" (2009)

=== Dr. Quinn, Medicine Woman ===
- Dr. Quinn, Medicine Woman: "Giving Thanks" (1993)
- Dr. Quinn, Medicine Woman: "Thanksgiving" (1994)
- Dr. Quinn, Medicine Woman: "One Touch of Nature" (1995)
- Dr. Quinn, Medicine Woman: "The Tempest" (1996)

=== ER ===
- "ER Confidential" (1994)
- "Great Expectations" (1999)
- "Rescue Me" (2000)
- "Freefall" (2003)
- "Scoop and Run" (2006)

=== Everwood ===
- "A Thanksgiving Tale" (2002)
- "Unhappy Holidays" (2003)

=== Family ===
- "A Tale Out of Season" (1977)
- "Generations" (1978)
- "Thanksgiving" (1979)

=== Felicity ===
- "Thanksgiving" (1998)
- "Family Affairs" (1999)
- "The Last Thanksgiving" (2001)

=== Grey's Anatomy ===
- "Thanks for the Memories" (2005)
- "Holidaze" (2009)
- "Somebody That I Used to Know" (2013) (Season 10, Episode 10)
- "Every Day Is a Holiday (With You)" (2021) (Season 18, Episode 6)

=== Hawaii Five-0 ===
- Hawaii Five-0: "Hauʻoli La Hoʻomaikaʻi" (2013)
- Hawaii Five-0: "Lele pū nā manu like" (2018)
- Hawaii Five-0: "Ka la′au kumu ′ole o Kahilikolo" (2019)

=== House M.D. ===
- "Ignorance Is Bliss" (2009)

=== Mad Men ===
- "The Wheel" (2007)
- "Public Relations" (2010)
- "Dark Shadows" (2012)
- "In Care Of" (2013)

=== Melrose Place ===
- "Cold Turkey" (1993)
- "The Days of Wine and Vodka" (1994)

=== NCIS franchise ===
- NCIS: "Child's Play" (2009)
- NCIS: "Sins of the Father" (2011)
- NCIS: "Shell Shock (Part II)" (2012)
- NCIS: "Grounded" (2014)
- NCIS: New Orleans: "Chasing Ghosts" (2014)
- NCIS: "Blood Brothers" (2015)
- NCIS: New Orleans: "Billy and the Kid" (2015)
- NCIS: "Enemy Combatant" (2016)
- NCIS: "Ready or Not" (2017)

=== Once and Again ===
- "Thanksgiving" (1999)
- "Feast or Famine" (2000)
- "Chaos Theory" (2001)

=== Private Practice ===
- "The Breaking Point" (2011)
- "Georgia on My Mind" (2012)

=== Promised Land ===
- Promised Land: "The Homecoming" (1996)
- Promised Land: "To Everything a Season" (1997)

=== Providence ===
- Providence: "Thank You, Providence" (1999)
- Providence: "The Thanksgiving Story" (2000)
- Providence: "Gobble, Gobble" (2001)
- Providence: "Left-Overs" (2002)

=== This Is Us ===
- "Pilgrim Rick" (2016)
- "Six Thanksgivings" (2018)
- "So Long, Marianne" (2019)
- "Taboo" (2022)

=== Touched by an Angel ===
- "An Unexpected Snow" (1994)
- "Homecoming" (1996)
- "Heaven's Portal" (2001)

=== The Waltons ===
- "The Thanksgiving Story" (1973)
- "The Waiting" (1979)
- A Day for Thanks on Walton's Mountain (1982) – TV movie
- A Walton Thanksgiving Reunion (1993) – TV movie
- A Waltons Thanksgiving (2022) – TV movie

=== The West Wing ===
- "Shibboleth" (Season 2, Episode 8) (November 22, 2000)
- "The Indians in the Lobby" (Season 3, Episode 8) (November 21, 2001)
- "Arctic Radar" (Season 4, Episode 10) (November 27, 2002)

== Teen dramas ==
- 90210: "Smoked Turkey" (2011)
- The Carrie Diaries: "Endgame" (2015)
- Dawson's Creek: "Guess Who's Coming to Dinner" (1999)
- Degrassi: "Spiderwebs" (2013)
- High School Musical: The Musical: The Series: Thanksgiving (2019)
- Greek: "The Wish-Pretzel" (2009)
- Jack & Bobby: "Lost Boys" (2004)
- Life Unexpected: "Thanks Ungiven" (2010)
- My Life with the Walter Boys: "Thanksgiving" (2023)
- One Tree Hill: "Between Raising Hell and Amazing Grace" (2010)
- Riverdale: "Chapter Sixty-Four: The Ice Storm" (2019)
- The Society: "Poison" (2019)
- Trinkets: "Same Time Last Year" (2020)

=== Beverly Hills, 90210 ===
- "The Kindness of Strangers" (1992)
- "Radar Love" (1993)
- "Breast Side Up" (1995)
- "If I Had a Hammer" (1996)
- "You Say GoodBye, I Say Hello" (1998)
- "What's in a Name" (1999)

=== Gossip Girl ===
- "Blair Waldorf Must Pie" (2007)
- "The Magnificent Archibalds" (2008)
- "The Treasure of Serena Madre" (2009)
- "It’s Really Complicated" (2012)

=== The O.C. ===
- "The Homecoming" (2003)
- "The Secret" (2003)
- "The Cold Turkey" (2006)

=== Party of Five ===
- "Thanksgiving" (1994)
- "Tender Age" (1998)
- "We Gather Together" (1999)
- Time of Your Life: "The Time They All Came Over for Thanksgiving" (1999)

=== Pretty Little Liars ===
- "Taking This One to the Grave" (2014)
- Pretty Little Liars: Original Sin: "Chapter Eight: Bad Blood" (2022)

== Comedy ==
- Adam Ruins Everything:
  - "The First Factsgiving" (2018)
  - "Adam Ruins Guns" (November 27, 2018)
- At Home with Amy Sedaris: "Thanksgiving" (2019)
- The Carol Burnett Show: "Dyan Cannon and Paul Lynde" (Season 4, Episode 11) (November 23, 1970)
- Cedric the Entertainer Presents:
  - "Episode 6" (Season 1, Episode 6) (November 27, 2002)
- Comedy Bang! Bang!:
  - "Amber Tamblyn Wears a Leather Jacket & Black Booties" (Season 3, Episode 16) (November 21, 2014)
  - "Mike Colter Wears a Pink Button Up and Black Boots" (Season 5, Episode 18) (November 16, 2016)
- In Living Color:
  - "Anton's Thanksgiving" (1990)
  - "Men On Cooking" (1992)
- Rowan & Martin's Laugh-In: "James Caan" (November 27, 1972) (Season 6, Episode 10)
- Saturday Night Live (1975–)
- Scream Queens: "Thanksgiving" (2015)
- With Love: "Thanksgiving" (2023)

== Comedy-drama ==
- AfterMASH: "Thanksgiving of '53" (1983)
- Baskets: "Thanksgiving" (2018)
- The Big C: "The Last Thanksgiving" (2011)
- Crazy Ex-Girlfriend: "My First Thanksgiving with Josh!" (2015)
- The Days and Nights of Molly Dodd: "Here's a Quick and Easy Recipe for Leftovers" (1990)
- Eight Is Enough: "All the Vice-President's Men" (1978)
- Glee: "Thanksgiving" (2012)
- Greek: "The Wish-Pretzel" (2009)
- Hart of Dixie: "The Pirate and the Practice" (2011)
- Hindsight: "The Cranberries" (2015)
- Insecure: "Lowkey Thankful" (2020)
- Jane the Virgin: "Chapter Twenty-Eight" (2015)
- Kidding: "Kintsugi" (2018)
- M*A*S*H: "The Yalu Brick Road" (1979)
- Married: "Thanksgiving" (2015)
- The Marvelous Mrs. Maisel: "Go Forward" (2023)
- Men in Trees: "New York Fiction" (2006)
- Miss Match: "Jive Turkey" (2003)
- Miss Farah (Arabic: الآنسة فرح): "Chapter Twenty-Eight" (Arabic: الفصل الثامن والعشرون) (2020)
- Northern Exposure: "Thanksgiving" (1992)
- Orange Is The New Black: "F***sgiving" (2013)
- Parenthood (1990 series): "Thanksgiving with a T that Rhymes with B that Stands for Basketball" (1990)
- Parenthood (2010 series): "Happy Thanksgiving" (2010)
- Related: "Francesca" (2005)
- Shameless: "Just Like the Pilgrims Intended" (2012)
- Shrinking: "The Last Thanksgiving" (2024)
- Somebody Somewhere: "Num Nums" (2024)
- Sports Night: "Thespis" (1998)
- Ugly Betty: "Four Thanksgivings and a Funeral" (2006)
- The Wonder Years (Season 4, Episode 7): "The Ties That Bind" (1990)

=== Ally McBeal ===
- "You Never Can Tell" (1998)
- "Troubled Water" (1999)

=== And Just Like That ===
- "Forget About the Boy" (2025)
- "Party of One" (2025)

=== Desperate Housewives ===
- "Don't Walk on the Grass" (2009)
- "Sorry Grateful" (2010)

=== Doogie Howser, M.D. ===
- "Don't Let the Turkeys Get You Down" (1990)
- "The Big Sleep...Not!" (1992)

=== Ed ===
- "Something Old, Something New" (2000)
- "The New World" (2001)
- "The Proposal" (2003)

=== The Four Seasons ===
- "Big Thanksgiving" (2026)
- "Little Thanksgiving" (2026)

=== Gilmore Girls ===
- "A Deep-Fried Korean Thanksgiving" (Season 3, Episode 9) (2002)
- "He's Slippin 'em Bread...Dig?" (Season 6, Episode 10) (2005)

=== Love Life ===
- "Luke Ducharme" (2020)
- "Augie Again" (2020)

== Supernatural/sci-fi series ==
- Amazing Stories: "Thanksgiving" (1986)
- Arrow: "Thanksgiving" (2017)
- Bone Chillers: "Frankenturkey" (1996)
- Buffy the Vampire Slayer: "Pangs" (1999)
- The Flash: "O Come, All Ye Thankful" (2018)
- A Gifted Man: "In Case of Missed Communication" (2011)
- Heroes: "Thanksgiving" (2009)
- Legends of Tomorrow: "Tagumo Attacks!!!" (2018)
- The Originals: "Out of the Easy" (2015)
- Quantum Leap: "The Leap Home" (Parts 1 and 2) (1990)
- Roswell: "Max in the City" (2000)
- Tales from the Darkside: "The Last Car" (1986)

=== Into the Dark ===
- "Flesh & Blood" (2018)
- "Pilgrim" (2019)

=== Smallville ===
- "Rage" (2006)
- "Ambush" (2010)

=== Star Wars ===
- Star Wars Holiday Special

=== Supergirl ===
- "Livewire" (2015)
- "Medusa" (2016)
- "Call to Action" (2018)

=== The Vampire Diaries ===
- Fade Into You (2014)
- Mommie Dearest (2015)

== Reality shows ==
- 7 Little Johnstons: "A Thanksgiving Ultimatum" (2021)
- 19 Kids and Counting: "Duggars Reunited" (2014)
- Alaskan Bush People: "Clear & Pheasant Danger" (2019)
- The Ashlee Simpson Show: "Ashlee Backs Up Her Vocals" (2005)
- Ax Men: "A Logger's Thanksgiving" (2008)
- Cake Boss: "Family Feast" (2011)
- Chrisley Knows Best:
  - "Baking Bad" (2017)
  - "Thanksgiving Special" (2019)
  - "Hot Meals and Dirty Deals" (2020)
- Glutton for Punishment: "Pumpkin Regatta" (2008)
- Jersey Shore: Family Vacation: "A Very Jersey Friendsgiving" (2018)
- King of Cars: "Talkin' Turkey" (2006)
- Ladies of London: "London Calling" (2015)
- Little People, Big World: "A Little Thanksgiving" (Parts 1 and 2) (2006)
- Long Island Medium: "Before the Baby" (2016)
- Meet the Barkers: "Thanksgiving" (2005)
- Newlyweds: Nick and Jessica: "The French Language" (2004)
- The Osbournes: "Get Stuffed" (2002)
- OutDaughtered:
  - "A Thanksgiving Miracle" (2017)
  - "A Very Busby Thanksgiving" (2018)
- Shahs of Sunset:
  - "A Tale of Two Turkeys" (2017)
  - "Zero Thanks Given'" (2021)
- Sister Wives: "Thanksgiving: The Good, the Bad, and the Ugly" (2016)
- T.I. & Tiny: The Family Hustle: "Harris Thanksgiving" (2014)

== Sitcoms ==
- 2 Broke Girls: "And the Very Christmas Thanksgiving" (2011)
- 3rd Rock from the Sun: "Gobble, Gobble, Dick, Dick" (1996) (Season 2, Episodes 10)
- 9JKL: "Make Thanksgiving Great Again" (2017)
- Accidental Family: "What Is This – Thanksgiving or a Nightmare?" (1967)
- The Adventures of Ozzie and Harriet: "The Day After Thanksgiving" (1952)
- Alexa & Katie: "Thanksgiving" (2018)
- ALF: "Turkey in the Straw" (Parts 1 & 2) (1988) (Season 3, Episodes 6 & 7)
- All in the Family: "The Little Atheist" (1975)
- Almost Perfect: "The Lost Weekend" (1995)
- The Ann Sothern Show: "The Thanksgiving Story" (1958)
- Archie Bunker's Place: "Thanksgiving Reunion" (1979)
- Are We There Yet?: "The Thanksgiving Episode" (2012)
- Babes: "The Thanksgiving Show" (1990)
- Baby Talk: "Cold Turkey" (1991)
- Bachelor Father: "Bentley's Double Play" (1959)
- Barney Miller: "Thanksgiving Story" (1977)
- Becker: "Sister Spoils the Turkey" (2003) (Season 6, Episode 7)
- Ben and Kate: "Reunion" (2012)
- Better with You: "Better with Thanksgiving" (2010)
- Bewitched: "Samantha's Thanksgiving to Remember" (1967)
- Black-ish: "Auntsgiving" (2016) (Season 3, Episode 7)
- Bob: "Mad Dog on 34th Street" (1992)
- The Bob Cummings Show: "Thanksgiving at Grandpa's" (1957)
- Boston Common: "Gobble, Gobble, Aggch!" (1996)
- The Boys Are Back: "Thanksgiving" (1994)
- The Brady Bunch: "The Un-Underground Movie" (1970)
- Built to Last: "A Thanksgiving to Remember" (1997, unaired)
- Café Americain: "... And Giblets for All" (1993)
- Call Me Kat: "Call Me Fancy Puffenstuff" (2022)
- Caroline in the City: "Caroline and the Balloon" (1995) (Season 1, Episodes 8)
- Carter Country: "Chicks and Turkeys" (1977)
- Charles in Charge: "The Loan Arranger" (1987)
- The Class: "The Class Gives Thanks" (2006)
- Clueless: "Never P.E.T.A. Squirrel" (1998) (Season 3, Episodes 8)
- Coach: "It Came from New York" (1993) (Season 6, Episodes 9)
- Common Law: "In the Matter of: Thanksgiving" (1996) - unaired
- Community: "Cooperative Escapism in Familial Relations" (2013) (Season 4, Episodes 5)
- Complete Savages: "Thanksgiving with the Savages" (2004)
- The Cool Kids: "Thanksgiving at Murray's" (2018)
- Cosby: "Turkey Day" (1998) (Season 3, Episodes 10)
- Cuts: "The Turkey Triangle" (2005)
- Cybill: "They Shoot Turkeys, Don't They?" (1995)
- Daddy Dearest: "Thanks, But No Thanks" (1993)
- Dave's World: "Death and Mom Take a Holiday" (1993)
- Designing Women: "Perky's Visit" (1986)
- Diff'rent Strokes/Hello, Larry crossover: "Thanksgiving Crossover" (1979)
- The Donna Reed Show: "Guest in the House" (1958)
- Don't Trust the B— in Apartment 23: "It's a Miracle..." (2012) (Season 2, Episodes 4)
- The Drew Carey Show: "Mimi's Day Parade" (1996) (Season 2, Episodes 9)
- Drexell's Class: "The Best Thanksgiving Ever" (1991)
- Ellen: "Kiss My Bum" (1996) (Season 4, Episodes 10)
- Empty Nest: "Thanksgiving at the Westons'" (1992)
- Eternally Yours: "Guess Who's Coven to Dinner" (2026)
- Evening Shade: "The Thanksgiving Show" (1991)
- Everybody Hates Chris: "Everybody Hates Thanksgiving" (2006) (Season 2, Episodes 8)
- The Fall and Rise of Reggie Dinkins: "Turkey Can Be This" (2026)
- Family Ties: "No Nukes Is Good Nukes" (1982)
- Father Knows Best: "Thanksgiving Day" (1954)
- Fired Up: "Honey, I Shrunk the Turkey" (1997)
- Flo: "A Castleberry Thanksgiving" (1980)
- George & Leo: "The Thanksgiving Show" (1997)
- The Burns and Allen Show: "Thanksgiving" (1951)
- Ghosts: "Planes, Shanes and Automobiles" (2025)
- Go On: "Dinner Takes All" (2012)
- Going Places: "The Thanksgiving Show" (1990)
- Good Morning Miami: "A Kiss Before Lying" (2003)
- Good Times: "Grandpa's Visit" (1976)
- Good Luck Charlie: It's a Charlie Duncan Thanksgiving (2011)
- Grandfathered: "Gerald's Two Dads" (2015)
- The Grinder: "Giving Thanks, Getting Justice" (2015)
- Grown Ups: "Why Can't We Not Be Friends?" (1999)
- Guys Like Us: "A Turkey Too Far" (1998)
- Guys with Kids: "Thanksgiving" (2012)
- Hank: "Hanksgiving" (2009)
- Happy Days: "The First Thanksgiving" (Season 6, Episode 12) (1978)
- Happy Endings: "More Like Stanksgiving" (Season 3, Episode 4) (2012)
- Happy Family: "Not Thanksgiving" (2003)
- Happy Hour: "Thanksgiving" (2006)
- Head of the Class: "Cold Turkey" (1986)
- Hello, Larry/Diff'rent Strokes crossover: "Thanksgiving Crossover" (1979)
- Home Economics: "Two Thousand Pounds of Sand, $240" (2021) (Season 2, Episodes 8)
- Ein Herz und eine Seele: "Erntedankfest" (1973)
- How to Be a Gentleman: "How to Upstage Thanksgiving" (unaired)
- I'm with Her: "Meet the Parent" (2003)
- In the House: "The Max Who Came to Dinner" (1996)
- It's All Relative: "Thanks, But No Thanks" (2003)
- It's Always Sunny in Philadelphia: "The Gang Squashes Their Beefs" (2013)
- The Jamie Foxx Show: "A Thanksgiving to Remember" (1996)
- The Jeff Foxworthy Show: "The Thanksgiving Episode" (1996)
- Jesse: "The Cheese Ship" (1998)
- The Jersey: "Thanksgiving Day" (2000)
- Joe's Life: "Parental Guidance Not Suggested?" (1993)
- Just Shoot Me!: "The First Thanksgiving" (2000) (Season 5, Episode 7)
- Kate & Allie: "Thanksgiving" (1985)
- Kenan and Kel: "Turkey Day" (1997) (Season 2, Episode 11)
- Kevin Can Wait: "Cooking Up a Storm" (2017) (Season 2, Episode 9)
- Ladies Man: "Thanks for Nothing" (1999) (Season 1, Episodes 10)
- The League: "Thanksgiving" (2011) (Season 3, Episodes 8)
- Less than Perfect: "Claude's Alternative Thanksgiving" (2003)
- Life's Work: "Gobbledegook" (1996)
- Listen Up: "Thanksgiving" (2004)
- Love & War: "I Love a Parade" (1993)
- Love That Girl!: "Thanks for Not Giving" (2013)
- Maggie Winters: "Angstgiving Day" (1998)
- Make Room for Daddy: "Thanksgiving Story" (1953)
- Malcolm & Eddie: "A Fowl and Stormy Night" (1999)
- Malcolm in the Middle: "Thanksgiving" (2003) (Season 5, Episode 4)
- Mama's Family: "An Ill Wind" (1986)
- Man with a Plan: "Thanksgiving" (2016) (Season 1, Episodes 5)
- Married People: "The Baby Cometh" (1990)
- Married to the Kellys: "The Apartment" (2003)
- Married... with Children: "A Bundy Thanksgiving" (1996) (Season 11, Episode 6)
- Marry Me: "Thank Me" (2014)
- Master of None: "Thanksgiving" (2017) (Season 2, Episodes 8)
- The McCarthys: "Love, McCarthys Style" (2014)
- Me, Myself & I: "Thanksgiving" (2017)
- The Michael J. Fox Show: "Thanksgiving" (2013)
- The Millers: "Papa Was a Rolling Bone" (2014) (Season 2, Episodes 8)
- The Mindy Project: "Thanksgiving" (2012) (Season 1, Episodes 6)
- A Minute with Stan Hooper: "An Old Fashioned Thanksgiving" (2003)
- Mister Ed: "Ed the Pilgrim" (1962)
- Mister Peepers: "Thanksgiving Show" (1953)
- The Mommies: "Thanks, But No Thanksgiving" (1993)
- Mr. Belvedere: "The Letter" (1985)
- Mr. Rhodes: "The Thanksgiving Show" (1996)
- The Munsters: "Low-Cal Munster" (1964)
- My Two Dads: "Thanks for the Memories" (1989)
- The Nanny: "Oh, Say, Can You Ski?" (1998)
- Ned & Stacey: "Thanksgiving Day Massacre" (1995)
- The Neighborhood: "Welcome to Thanksgiving" (2018) (Season 1, Episode 8)
- The New Adventures of Old Christine: "Guess Who's Not Coming to Dinner?" (2008) (Season 4, Episodes 10)
- The New Leave It to Beaver: "Thanksgiving Day" (1984)
- The New Normal: "Pardon Me" (2012)
- Newlyweds: "Thanksgiving" (2026)
- Normal, Ohio: "A Thanksgiving Episode" (2000)
- The Office: "WUPHF.com" (2010)
- Oh Baby: "Family History" (1999)
- One World: "The Thanksgiving Show" (1998)
- Our Miss Brooks: "Thanksgiving Show" (1953)
- Out of Practice: "Thanks" (2005)
- Outsourced: "Temporary Monsanity" (2010)
- The Parent 'Hood: "The Parade-Y Bunch" (1996)
- Partners: "How Long Does It Take to Cook a 22-Pound Turkey?" (1995)
- Perfect Harmony: "Thanks-Talking" (2019)
- Perfect Strangers: "Wild Turkey" (1991)
- The Pride of the Family: "Thanksgiving Story" (1953)
- Quintuplets: "Thanksgiving Day Charade" (2004)
- The Ranch: "Like It's the Last Time" (2020)
- The Real O'Neals: "The Real Tradition" (2016) (Season 2, Episode 5)
- The Really Loud House: "A Really Loud Thanksgiving: The Gobble Squabble Debacle" (2024) (Season 2, Episode 20)
- Rodney: "Thanksgiving" (2004)
- Sabrina the Teenage Witch: "Love Means Having to Say You're Sorry" (1999) (Season 4, Episode 9)
- Saved by the Bell: The College Years: "A Thanksgiving Story" (1993)
- Saved by the Bell: The New Class: "Thanks For Giving" (1997)
- Scrubs: "My Day Off" (2001) (Season 1, Episode 9)
- Seinfeld: "The Mom and Pop Store" (November 17, 1994) (Season 6, Episode 8)
- Silver Spoons: "Voyage of the Darned" (Parts 1 and 2) (1984)
- Single Parents: "Every Thursday Should Be Like This" (2019) (Season 2, Episode 8)
- Sister, Sister: "Thanksgiving in Hawaii" (Parts 1 and 2) (1995)
- Small Wonder: "Thanksgiving Story" (1986)
- Something So Right: "Something About Thanksgiving" (1996)
- Still Standing: "Still Thankful" (2002) (Season 1, Episodes 9)
- Strangers with Candy: "Trail of Tears" (2000) (Season 3, Episode 3)
- Suddenly Susan: "Cold Turkey" (1996)
- Sunnyside: "Too Many Lumpies" (2019)
- Superior Donuts: "Thanks for Nothing" (2017) (Season 2, Episodes 4)
- Thanks: "Thanksgiving" (1999)
- That Girl: "Thanksgiving Comes But Once a Year, Hopefully" (1967)
- Thea: "Mama, I'm Full" (1993)
- 'Til Death: "The Courtship of Eddie's Parents" (2009)
- Titus: "The Perfect Thanksgiving" (2000)
- The Tony Danza Show: "Thanks...But No Thanksgiving" (1998)
- The Torkelsons: "Thanksgivingmesomething" (1991)
- Townies: "Thanksgiving" (1996)
- Twins: "Sister's Keeper" (2005)
- Unbreakable Kimmy Schmidt: "Kimmy Finds Her Mom" (2016)
- The Unicorn: "Turkeys and Traditions" (2019) (Season 1, Episode 8)
- Union Square: "Jack Gets a Hot Tip" (1997)
- Up All Night: "Thanksgiving" (2012) (Season 2, Episodes 7)
- Veep: "Thanksgiving" (Season 5, Episode 5) (2016)
- Welcome to the Family: "Thanksgiving" (2013) (Season 1, Episode 8)
- What's Happening!!: "Mama The School Girl" (1977)
- Who's the Boss?: "Thanksgiving at Mrs. Rossini's" (1985) (Season 2, Episode 9)
- WKRP in Cincinnati: "Turkeys Away" (1978) (Season 1, Episode 7)
- Woops!: "The Thanksgiving Show" (1992)
- Workaholics: "6 Hours Till Hedonism II" (2011) (Season 2, Episode 10)
- Yes, Dear: "Guess Who's Not Coming to Dinner" (2001) (Season 2, Episode 9)

=== 8 Simple Rules ===
- "Paul Meets His Match" (Season 1, Episode 11) (November 26, 2002)
- "The First Thanksgiving" (Season 2, Episode 8) (November 25, 2003)
- "Thanksgiving Guest" (Season 3, Episode 9) (aka "Thanksgiving") (November 26, 2004)

=== A Different World ===
- "If You Like Pilgrim Coladas" (Season 2, Episode 6) (November 17, 1988)
- "Faith, Hope and Charity" (Season 6, Episode 9-10) (two-part episode) (November 12, 1992)

=== According to Jim ===
- "The Turkey Bowl" (Season 1, Episode 8) (November 21, 2001)
- "Thanksgiving Confidential" (Season 2, Episode 9) (November 26, 2002)
- "The Empty Gesture" (Season 3, Episode 11) (November 25, 2003)
- "The Hunters" (Season 4, Episode 8) (November 23, 2004)

=== Alice ===
- "Who Ordered the Hot Turkey?" (Season 3, Episode 9) (1978)
- "Alice's Turkey of a Thanksgiving" (Season 7, Episode 6) (1982)

=== All of Us ===
- "Parents Just Don't Understand" (Season 2, Episode 8) (November 23, 2004)
- "My Two Dads" (Season 4, Episode 8) (November 20, 2006)

=== American Housewife ===
- "The Blow-Up" (November 22, 2016) (Season 1, Episode 6)
- "Family Secrets" (November 17, 2017) (Season 2, Episode 7)

=== The Bernie Mac Show ===
- "Tryptophan-tasy" (November 27, 2002) (Season 2, Episode 7)
- "Thanksgiving" (2004) (Season 3, Episode 22)

=== The Beverly Hillbillies ===
- "Elly's First Date" (Season 1, Episode 9) (November 21, 1962)
- "Turkey Day" (Season 2, Episode 10) (November 27, 1963)
- "The Thanksgiving Spirit" (Season 7, Episode 10) (November 27, 1968)

=== The Big Bang Theory/Young Sheldon/Georgie & Mandy's First Marriage ===
- "The Thanksgiving Decoupling" (Season 7, Episode 9) (November 21, 2013)
- "The Platonic Permutation" (Season 9, Episode 9) (November 19, 2015)
- Young Sheldon:
  - "Family Dynamics and a Red Fiero" (November 15, 2018) (Season 2, Episode 9)
- Georgie & Mandy's First Marriage:
  - "Thanksgiving" (Season 1, Episode 5) (November 14, 2024)

=== The Bob Newhart Show ===
- "An American Family" (Season 3, Episode 11) (November 23, 1974)
- "Over the River and Through the Woods" (Season 4, Episode 11) (November 22, 1975)

=== Boy Meets World ===
- "Turkey Day" (Season 4, Episode 10) (November 22, 1996)
- "Chasing Angela-Part II" (Season 5, Episode 8) (November 14, 1997)

=== Brooklyn Nine-Nine ===
- "Thanksgiving" (November 26, 2013) (Season 1, Episode 10)
- "Lockdown" (November 16, 2014) Season 2, Episode 7)
- "Ava" (November 22, 2015) (Season 3, Episode 8)
- "Mr. Santiago" (November 22, 2016) (Season 4, Episode 7)
- "Two Turkeys" (November 21, 2017) (Season 5, Episode 7)

=== Brothers ===
- "Gobba, Gobba" (Season 2, Episode 23) (1985)
- "Thanksgiving" (Season 4, Episode 21) (1987)

=== Cheers ===
- "Thanksgiving Orphans" (Season 5, Episode 9) (November 27, 1986)
- "Ill-Gotten Gaines" (Season 11, Episode 8) (November 19, 1992)

=== The Cosby Show ===
- "Bon Jour, Sondra" (Season 1, Episode 10) (November 22, 1984)
- "Cliff's Wet Adventure" (Season 6, Episode 9) (November 16, 1989)

=== Cougar Town ===
- "Here Comes My Girl" (November 25, 2009) (Season 1, Episode 9)
- "When the Time Comes" (November 27, 2010) (Season 2, Episode 9)
- "It'll All Work Out" (2012) (Season 3, Episode 13)

=== Dharma & Greg ===
- "The First Thanksgiving" (Season 1, Episode 10) (November 26, 1997)
- "Thanksgiving Until It Hurts" (Season 3, Episode 10) (November 23, 1999)
- "Wish We Weren't Here" (Season 5, Episode 9) (November 20, 2001)

=== A Different World ===
- "If You Like Pilgrim Coladas" (Season 2, Episode 6) (November 24, 1988)
- "Faith, Hope and Charity" (Season 6, Episode 9-10) (2-part episode) (November 12, 1992)

=== Dr. Ken ===
- "Thanksgiving Culture Clash" (Season 1, Episode 8) (November 20, 2015)
- "Allison's Thanksgiving Meltdown" (Season 2, Episode 8) (November 18, 2016)

=== Everybody Loves Raymond ===
- "Turkey or Fish" (Season 1, Episode 10) (November 22, 1996)
- "No Fat" (Season 3, Episode 10) (November 23, 1998)
- "No Thanks" (Season 4, Episode 9) (November 22, 1999)
- "Fighting In-Laws" (Season 5, Episode 9) (November 20, 2000)
- "Older Women" (Season 6, Episode 9) (November 19, 2001)
- "Marie's Vision" (Season 7, Episode 10) (November 25, 2002)
- "The Bird" (Season 8, Episode 9) (November 24, 2003)
- "Debra's Parents" (Season 9, Episode 7) (November 22, 2004)

=== Frasier ===
- "A Lilith Thanksgiving" (Season 4, Episode 7) (November 26, 1996)
- "The Apparent Trap" (Season 7, Episode 9) (November 18, 1999)

=== Fresh Off the Boat ===
- "Huangsgiving" (November 17, 2015) (Season 2, Episode 8)
- "No Thanks-giving" (November 15, 2016) (Season 3, Episode 5)
- "The Day After Thanksgiving" (November 14, 2017) (Season 4, Episode 7)

=== The Fresh Prince of Bel-Air ===
- "Talking Turkey" (Season 1, Episode 12) (November 19, 1990)
- "There's the Rub (Part 1)"/"There's the Rub (Part 2)" (Season 6, Episodes 9 & 10) (November 20, 1995)

=== Friends / Joey ===
- "The One Where Underdog Gets Away" (Season 1, Episode 9) (November 17, 1994)
- "The One With the List" (Season 2, Episode 8) (November 16, 1995)
- "The One with the Football" (Season 3, Episode 9) (November 21, 1996)
- "The One with Chandler in a Box" (Season 4, Episode 8) (November 20, 1997)
- "The One with All the Thanksgivings" (Season 5, Episode 8) (November 19, 1998)
- "The One Where Ross Got High" (Season 6, Episode 9) (November 25, 1999)
- "The One Where Chandler Doesn't Like Dogs" (Season 7, Episode 8) (November 23, 2000)
- "The One with the Rumor" (Season 8, Episode 9) (November 22, 2001)
- "The One with Rachel's Other Sister" (Season 9, Episode 8) (November 21, 2002)
- "The One with the Late Thanksgiving" (Season 10, Episode 8) (November 20, 2003)
- Joey:
  - "Joey and the Bachelor Thanksgiving" (Season 2, Episode 10) (November 24, 2005)

=== Full House / Fuller House ===
- "The Miracle of Thanksgiving" (Season 1, Episode 9) (November 20, 1987)
- Fuller House:
  - "Fuller Thanksgiving" (Season 2, Episode 10) (2016)
  - "Cold Turkey" (Season 5, Episode 12) (2020)

=== Gary Unmarried ===
- "Gary Gives Thanks" (Season 1, Episode 9) (November 26, 2008)
- "Gary Apologizes" (Season 2, Episode 8) (November 18, 2009)

=== George Lopez ===
- "Guess Who's Coming to Dinner, Honey" (Season 2, Episode 9) (November 27, 2002)
- "Would You Like a Drumstick or a Kidney?" (Season 3, Episode 10) (November 21, 2003)
- "Trouble in Paradise" (Season 4, Episode 8) (November 23, 2004)

=== Girlfriends ===
- "Fried Turkey" (Season 1, Episode 9) (November 20, 2000)
- "Porn to Write" (Season 5, Episode 10) (November 29, 2004)

=== The Goldbergs / Schooled ===
- "Stop Arguing and Start Thanking" (November 19, 2013) (Season 1, Episode 9)
- "A Goldberg Thanksgiving" (November 19, 2014) (Season 2, Episode 7)
- "In Conclusion, Thanksgiving" (November 18, 2015) (Season 3, Episode 8)
- "Ho-ly K.I.T.T." (November 16, 2016) (Season 4, Episode 7)
- "A Wall Street Thanksgiving" (November 15, 2017) (Season 5, Episode 8)
- "Angst-Giving" (November 20, 2019) (Season 7, Episode 8)
- "A Light Thanksgiving Nosh" (November 17, 2021) (Season 9, Episode 8)
- "Another Turkey in the Trot" (November 16, 2022) (Season 10, Episode 8)
- Schooled:
  - "Friendsgiving" (November 20, 2019) (Season 2, Episode 8)

=== Grace Under Fire ===
- "Cold Turkey" (Season 2, Episode 9) (November 22, 1994)
- "Thanks for Nothing" (Season 3, Episode 9) (November 22, 1995)

=== Half & Half ===
- "The Big Thanks for Forgiving Episode" (Season 1, Episode 10) (November 25, 2002)
- "The Big Thanks for Nothing Episode" (Season 3, Episode 9) (November 22, 2004)

=== Hazel ===
- "Everybody's Thankful But Us Turkeys" (Season 1, Episode 9) (1961)
- "Genie with the Light Brown Lamp" (Season 2, Episode 10) (1962)
- "Hazel and the Vanishing Hero" (Season 3, Episode 11) (1963)
- "A Lesson in Diplomacy" (Season 4, Episode 11) (1964)

=== Home Improvement ===
- "A Frozen Moment" (Season 3, Episode 10) (November 24, 1993)
- "My Dinner with Wilson" (Season 4, Episode 9) (November 22, 1994)
- "The Wood, the Bad and the Hungry" (Season 6, Episode 10) (November 26, 1996)
- "Thanksgiving" (Season 7, Episode 9) (November 25, 1997)
- "Thanks, but No Thanks" (Season 8, Episode 10) (November 24, 1998)

=== Hope & Faith ===
- "Phone Home for the Holidays" (Season 1, Episode 11) (November 21, 2003)
- "9021-Uh-Oh" (Season 2, Episode 10) (November 26, 2004)
- "Blood Is Thicker Than Daughter" (Season 3, Episode 9) (November 18, 2005)

=== How I Met Your Mother ===
- "Belly Full of Turkey" (Season 1, Episode 9) (November 22, 2005)
- "Slapsgiving" (Season 3, Episode 9) (November 19, 2007)
- "Slapsgiving 2: Revenge of the Slap" (Season 5, Episode 9) (November 23, 2009)
- "Blitzgiving" (Season 6, Episode 10) (November 22, 2010)
- "The Rebound Girl" (Season 7, Episode 11) (November 21, 2011)

=== The Hughleys ===
- "Thanksgiving Episode" (Season 1, Episode 10) (November 24, 1998)
- "Roots" (Parts 1 and 2) (Season 2, Episode 7 & 8) (November 5, 1999) (November 12, 1999)
- "Oh Thank Heaven for Seven-Eleven" (Season 3, Episode 9) (November 20, 2000)
- "One Foot in the Gravy" (Season 4, Episode 11) (November 19, 2001)

=== The King of Queens ===
- "Supermarket Story" (Season 1, Episode 10) (November 23, 1998)
- "Roamin' Holiday" (Season 2, Episode 10) (November 22, 1999)
- "Dark Meet" (Season 3, Episode 8) (November 20, 2000)
- "Loaner Car" (Season 5, Episode 10) (November 25, 2002)
- "Thanks Man" (Season 6, Episode 9) (November 26, 2003)

=== Last Man Standing ===
- "Thanksgiving" (Season 3, Episode 9) (November 22, 2013)
- "The Gratitude List" (Season 5, Episode 9) (November 20, 2015)
- "My Father the Car" (Season 6, Episode 8) (November 18, 2016)

=== Life in Pieces ===
- "Godparent Turkey Corn Farts" (November 19, 2015) (Season 1, Episode 8)
- "Testosterone Martyr Baked Knife" (November 23, 2017) (Season 3, Episode 4)

=== Living Single ===
- "Love Takes a Holiday" (Season 1, Episode 13) (November 21, 1993)
- "Thanks for Giving" (Season 2, Episode 12) (November 24, 1994)

=== The Love Boat ===
- "Man of the Cloth/Her Own Two Feet/Tony's Family" (Season 2, Episode 10) (November 18, 1978)
- "The Best of Friends/Too Many Dads/Love Will Find a Way" (Season 6, Episode 9) (November 20, 1982)

=== Mad About You ===
- "Riding Backwards" (Season 1, Episode 9) (November 18, 1992)
- "Giblets for Murray" (Season 3, Episode 8) (November 17, 1994)
- "Outbreak" (Season 5, Episode 7) (November 19, 1996)
- "The Thanksgiving Show" (Season 7, Episode 7) (November 24, 1998)

=== Martin ===
- "Thanks for Nothing" (Season 2, Episode 13) (November 21, 1993)
- "Feast or Famine" (Season 3, Episode 11) (November 24, 1994)

=== The Middle ===
- "Thanksgiving" (November 25, 2009) (Season 1, Episode 8)
- "Thanksgiving II" (November 24, 2010) (Season 2, Episode 9)
- "Thanksgiving III" (November 23, 2011) (Season 3, Episode 10)
- "Thanksgiving IV" (November 14, 2012) (Season 4, Episode 8)
- "Thanksgiving V" (November 20, 2013) (Season 5, Episode 7)
- "Thanksgiving VI" (November 19, 2014) (Season 6, Episode 7)
- "Thanksgiving VII" (November 18, 2015) (Season 7, Episode 8)
- "Thanksgiving VIII" (November 22, 2016) (Season 8, Episode 6)
- "Thanksgiving IX" (November 14, 2017) (Season 9, Episode 7)

=== Mike & Molly ===
- "Molly Gets a Hat" (Season 1, Episode 10) (November 22, 2010)
- "Mike Cheats" (Season 2, Episode 9) (November 21, 2011)
- "Thanksgiving Is Cancelled" (Season 3, Episode 7) (November 19, 2012)

=== Modern Family ===
- "Punkin Chunkin" (November 23, 2011) (Season 3, Episode 9)
- "Three Turkeys" (November 19, 2014) (Season 6, Episode 8)
- "Thanksgiving Jamboree" (November 16, 2016) (Season 8, Episode 7)
- "Winner Winner Turkey Dinner" (November 15, 2017) (Season 9, Episode 7)
- "The Last Thanksgiving" (November 6, 2019) (Season 11, Episode 7)

=== Moesha ===
- "Road Trip" (Season 2, Episode 13) (November 26, 1996)
- "Thanksgiving" (Season 5, Episode 10) (November 22, 1999)
- "All This and Turkey, Too" (Season 6, Episode 10) (November 20, 2000)

=== Murphy Brown ===
- "Mission Control" (Season 4, Episode 11) (November 25, 1991)
- "Thanksgiving and Taking" (Season 11, Episode 9) (November 22, 2018)

=== My Three Sons ===
- "Chip's Harvest" (Season 1, Episode 8) (November 17, 1960)
- TV Movie: "A Thanksgiving Reunion with The Partridge Family and My Three Sons" (November 25, 1977)

=== The Neighbors ===
- "Thanksgiving Is for the Bird-Kersees" (November 14, 2012) (Season 1, Episode 8)
- "Thanksgiving Is No Schmuck Bait" (November 22, 2013) (Season 2, Episode 9)

=== New Girl ===
- "Thanksgiving" (November 15, 2011) (Season 1, Episode 6)
- "Parents" (November 20, 2012) (Season 2, Episode 8)
- "Thanksgiving III" (November 26, 2013) (Season 3, Episode 10)
- "Thanksgiving IV" (November 25, 2014) (Season 4, Episode 9)
- "Last Thanksgiving" (November 22, 2016) (Season 6, Episode 7)

=== Newhart ===
- "Don't Rain on My Parade" (Season 2, Episode 6) (November 21, 1983)
- "Thanksgiving for the Memories" (Season 5, Episode 8) (November 24, 1986)

=== Night Court ===
- "Harry and the Madam" (Season 2, Episode 8) (November 22, 1984)
- "The Last Temptation of Mac" (Season 6, Episode 6) (November 23, 1988)

=== One on One ===
- "Thanksgiving It to Me, Baby" (Season 1, Episode 11) (November 19, 2001)
- "Who Brought the Jive Turkey?" (Season 4, Episode 9) (November 22, 2004)

=== The Parkers ===
- "It's a Family Affair" (Season 1, Episode 11) (November 22, 1999)
- "Turkey Day Blues" (Season 2, Episode 10) (November 20, 2000)

=== Raising Hope ===
- "Meet the Grandparents" (November 23, 2010) (Season 1, Episode 9)
- "Burt's Parents" (November 15, 2011) (Season 2, Episode 7)
- "Candy Wars" (November 20, 2012) (Season 3, Episode 7)

=== Reba ===
- "Thanksgiving" (Season 4, Episode 9) (November 19, 2004)
- "Invasion" (Season 5, Episode 9) (November 18, 2005)

=== Roseanne / The Conners ===
Roseanne

- "We Gather Together" (Season 2, Episode 9)(November 21, 1989)
- "Thanksgiving '91" (Season 4, Episode 10) (November 26, 1991)
- "Thanksgiving '93" (Season 6, Episode 10) (November 23, 1993)
- "Thanksgiving '94" (Season 7, Episode 10) (November 23, 1994)
- "The Last Thursday in November" (Season 8, Episode 8) (November 21, 1995)
- "Home Is Where the Afghan Is" (Season 9, Episode 10) (November 26, 1996)

The Conners

- "Slappy Holidays" (Season 2, Episode 7) (November 19, 2019)
- "Of Missing Minds and Missing Fries" (Season 5, Episode 8) (November 16, 2022)

=== The Single Guy ===
- "Sister" (Season 1, Episode 8) (November 16, 1995)
- "Davy Jones" (Season 2, Episode 9) (November 21, 1996)

=== Speechless ===
- "T-h-a-Thanksgiving" (November 16, 2016) (Season 1, Episode 7)
- "B-r-i-British I-n-v-Invasion" (November 15, 2017) (Season 2, Episode 7)
- "C-e-Celebrity S-u-Suite" (November 16, 2018) (Season 3, Episode 6)

=== Spin City ===
- "The Competition" (Season 1, Episode 8) (November 26, 1996)
- "Gobble the Wonder Turkey Saves the Day" (Season 3, Episode 10) (November 24, 1998)
- "The Thanksgiving Show" (Season 4, Episode 9) (November 24, 1999)
- "Balloons Over Broadway" (Season 5, Episode 6) (November 22, 2000)

=== Suburgatory ===
- "Thanksgiving" (November 23, 2011) (Season 1, Episode 8)
- "The Wishbone" (November 14, 2012) (Season 2, Episode 5)

=== That '70s Show ===
- "Thanksgiving" (Season 1, Episode 9) (November 22, 1998)
- "Thank You" (Season 5, Episode 8) (December 3, 2002)
- "You Can't Always Get What You Want" (Season 7, Episode 9) (November 24, 2004)

=== Too Close for Comfort ===
- "Rafkin's Bum" (Season 2, Episode 6) (November 24, 1981)
- "A Thanksgiving Tale" (Season 3, Episode 9) (November 25, 1982)

=== Two and a Half Men ===
- "Merry Thanksgiving" (Season 1, Episode 10) (November 24, 2003)
- "Ow, Ow, Don't Stop" (Season 8, Episode 10) (November 22, 2010)

=== Two Guys and a Girl ===
- "Two Guys, a Girl and a Thanksgiving" (Season 2, Episode 10) (November 25, 1998)
- "Talking Turkey" (Season 3, Episode 9) (November 17, 1999)

=== Veronica's Closet ===
- "Veronica's First Thanksgiving" (Season 1, Episode 8) (November 20, 1997)
- "Veronica's Thanksgiving That Keeps On Giving" (Season 2, Episode 8) (November 19, 1998)
- "Veronica's Got All the Right Stuffing" (Season 3, Episode 7) (November 22, 1999)

=== Webster ===
- "Thanksgiving Show" (Season 2, Episode 8) (November 16, 1984)
- "Thanksgiving with the Four Tops" (Season 6, Episode 16) (January 6, 1989)

=== What I Like About You ===
- "Thanksgiving" (Season 1, Episode 9) (November 22, 2002)
- "Ground-Turkey-Hog-Day" (Season 4, Episode 9) (November 18, 2005)

=== Will & Grace ===
- "Homo for the Holidays" (Season 2, Episode 7) (November 25, 1999)
- "Lows in the Mid-Eighties" (Season 3, Episode 8-9) (November 23, 2000)
- "Moveable Feast" (Season 4, Episode 9-10) (November 22, 2001)
- "Queens for a Day" (Season 7, Episode 10-11) (November 25, 2004)

== Animated sitcoms ==
- Calvin and the Colonel: "Thanksgiving Dinner" (Season 1, Episode 3) (1961)
- Beavis and Butt-Head: "Beavis and Butt-Head Do Thanksgiving" (November 27, 1997) (Season 7, Episode Non-Canon)
- Dr. Katz, Professional Therapist: "Thanksgiving" (November 23, 1998) (Season 5, Episode 18)
- Aqua Teen Hunger Force: "The Dressing" (2003) (Season 2, Episode 21)
- Father of the Pride: "The Thanksgiving Episode" (2004) (Season 1, Episode 9)
- Dan Vs.: "The Family Thanksgiving" (November 19, 2011) (Season 2, Episode 1)
- Son of Zorn: "The Battle of Thanksgiving" (November 13, 2016) (Season 1, Episode 7)
- Squidbillies: "Thank-Taking" (November 20, 2016) (Season 10, Episode 9)
- SuperMansion: "A Prayer for Mister T: A SuperMansion Thanksgiving Special" (November 15, 2018)
- Big Mouth: "Thanksgiving" (November 5, 2021) (Season 5, Episode 5)
- F Is for Family: "Thank You So Much" (November 25, 2021) (Season 5, Episode 4)
- Solar Opposites: "The Hunt for Brown October" (2024)

=== American Dad! ===
- "There Will Be Bad Blood" (November 28, 2010) (Season 6, Episode 6)
- "Kung Pao Turkey" (November 24, 2013) (Season 9, Episode 5)

=== Bless the Harts ===
- ”Mega-Lo-Memories” (November 24, 2019) (Season 1, Episode 8)
- "Mega Lo Memories: Part Deux" (November 22, 2020) (Season 2, Episode 7)

=== Bob's Burgers ===
- "An Indecent Thanksgiving Proposal" (November 18, 2012) (Season 3, Episode 5)
- "Turkey in a Can" (November 24, 2013) (Season 4, Episode 5)
- "Dawn of the Peck" (November 23, 2014) (Season 5, Episode 4)
- "Gayle Makin' Bob Sled" (November 8, 2015) (Season 6, Episode 4)
- "The Quirkducers" (November 20, 2016) (Season 7, Episode 6)
- "Thanks-Hoarding" (November 19, 2017) (Season 8, Episode 5)
- "I Bob Your Pardon" (November 18, 2018) (Season 9, Episode 7)
- "Now We're Not Cooking with Gas" (November 24, 2019) (Season 10, Episode 8)
- "Diarrhea of a Poopy Kid" (November 22, 2020) (Season 11, Episode 7)
- "Stuck in the Kitchen With You" (November 21, 2021) (Season 12, Episode 8)
- "Putts-giving" (November 20, 2022) (Season 13, Episode 8)

=== The Cleveland Show ===
- "A Brown Thanksgiving" (November 22, 2009) (Season 1, Episode 7)
- "Another Bad Thanksgiving" (November 28, 2010) (Season 2, Episode 7)
- "A General Thanksgiving Episode" (November 18, 2012) (Season 4, Episode 3)
- "Turkey Pot Die" (November 25, 2012) (Season 4, Episode 4)

=== Family Guy ===
- "Thanksgiving" (November 20, 2011) (Season 10, Episode 6)
- "Into Harmony's Way" (2013) (Season 12, Episode 7)
- "Turkey Guys" (November 16, 2014) (Season 13, Episode 5)
- "Peter's Sister" (November 15, 2015) (Season 14, Episode 6)
- "Shanksgiving" (November 24, 2019) (Season 18, Episode 8)

=== King of the Hill ===
- "Nine Pretty Darn Angry Men" (November 17, 1998) (Season 3, Episode 7)
- "Happy Hank's Giving" (November 21, 1999) (Season 4, Episode 7)
- "Spin the Choice" (November 19, 2000) (Season 5, Episode 4)
- "Goodbye Normal Jeans" (November 24, 2002) (Season 7, Episode 4)

=== Rick and Morty ===
- "Rick and Morty's Thanksploitation Spectacular" (July 25, 2021) (Season 5, Episode 6)
- "Bethic Twinstinct" (September 18, 2022) (Season 6, Episode 3)

=== The Simpsons ===
- "Bart vs. Thanksgiving" (November 22, 1990) (Season 2, Episode 7)
- "Homer vs. Dignity" (November 26, 2000) (Season 12, Episode 5)
- "Homer the Moe" (November 18, 2001) (Season 13, Episode 3)
- "The Wettest Stories Ever Told" (April 23, 2006) (Season 17, Episode 18)
- "Thanksgiving of Horror" (November 24, 2019) (Season 31, Episode 8)
- "It's a Blunderful Life" (November 19, 2023) (Season 35, Episode 7)

=== South Park ===
- "Starvin' Marvin" (November 19, 1997) (Season 1, Episode 8)
- "Helen Keller! The Musical" (November 22, 2000) (Season 4, Episode 13)
- "A History Channel Thanksgiving" (November 9, 2011) (Season 15, Episode 13)
- "Black Friday" (November 13, 2013) (Season 17, Episode 7)
- "Turkey Trot" (November 26, 2025) (Season 28, Episode 4)

== Professional wrestling ==
- National Wrestling Alliance: Starrcade (1983–87, 2017–present as a WWE brand)
- World Wrestling Federation/Entertainment: Survivor Series (1987–present)
- Impact Wrestling/Total Nonstop Action/Global Force: TNA Genesis (2005–07), TNA Turning Point (2008–13)

== Canadian series ==
- The Big Comfy Couch: Feast of Fools (1993)
- Darcy's Wild Life: "Thanksgiving" (2005)
- The Best Years: "Destiny" (2009)
- How To Be Indie: "How to Be Thankful" (2010)
- Son of a Critch: "Thanksgiving" (2024)

== Others ==
- American Playhouse: "The Star-Crossed Romance of Josephine Cosnowski" (1985)
- CBS Reports: "Harvest of Shame" (1960)
- Conan: "The Turducken Kerfuffle" (2010)
- Dolly: "A Tennessee Mountain Thanksgiving" (1987)
- Edgar Bergen and Charlie McCarthy (1950)
- The Lawrence Welk Show: "Thanksgiving Special" (1955–81)
- NBC News: Matt Lauer specials: "People of the Year" (2009–10), "Macy's Thanksgiving Day Parade 85th Anniversary Special" (2011)
- The Oprah Winfrey Show: "Oprah's Favorite Things" (1990s–2008, 2010)
- The Perry Como Thanksgiving Show (1961, 1965)
- Remembering Bo (2006)
- Rosie Live (2008)
- The Smothers Brothers Thanksgiving Special (1988)
- Soul Train Music Awards (1987–)
- A Very Gaga Thanksgiving (2011)

== See also ==
- List of films set around Thanksgiving
- List of Christmas television specials
- List of United States Christmas television specials
- List of Christmas television episodes
- List of Easter television specials
- List of Halloween television specials
- List of St. Patrick's Day television specials
- List of Valentine's Day television specials
- List of Independence Day television specials
