= Thanksgiving =

Holiday in various countries

Thanksgiving Day
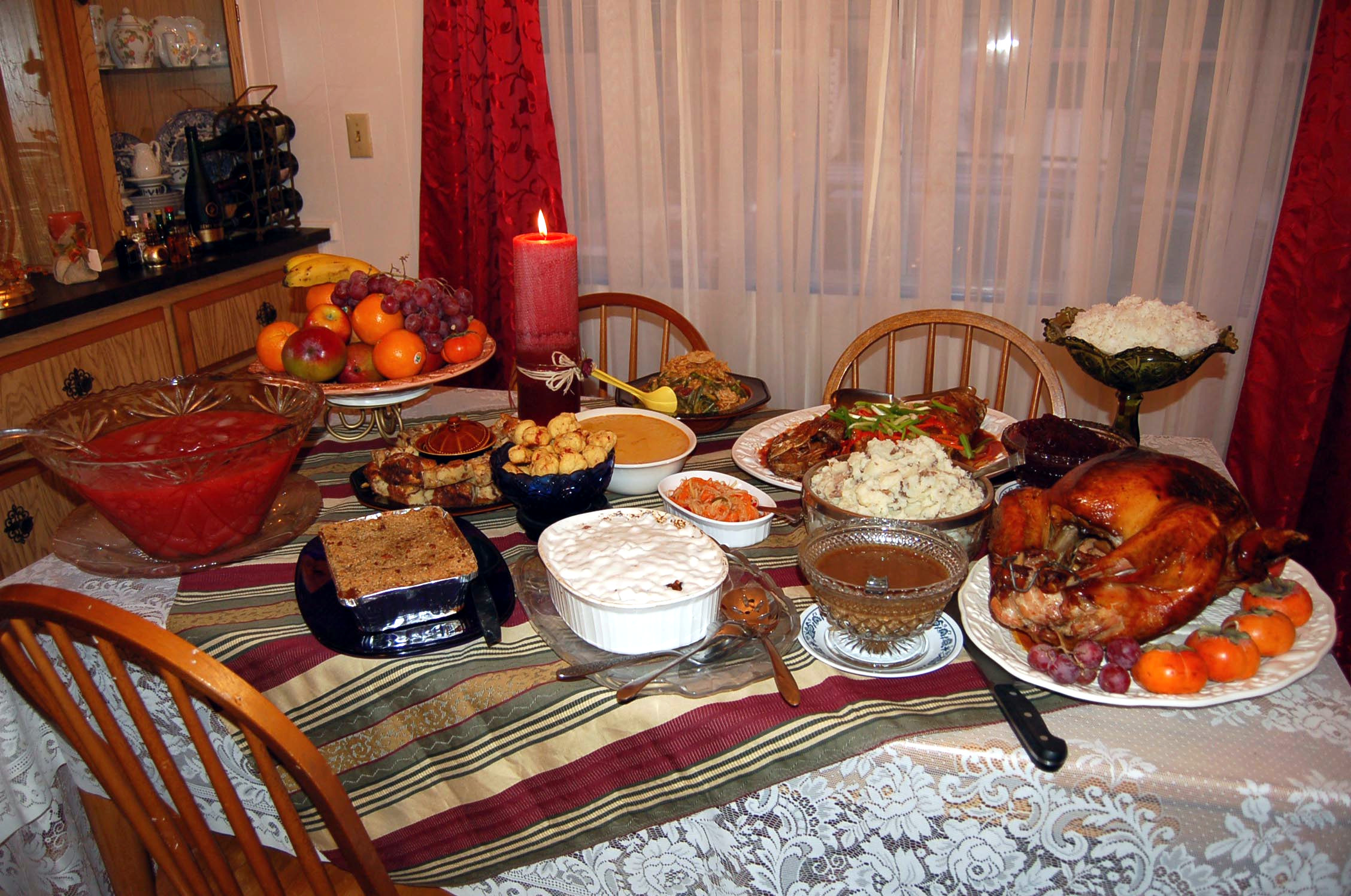
- A typical Thanksgiving dinner in the United States
- Observed by: Canada, Liberia, Saint Lucia, United States, Norfolk Island
- Type: National, cultural
- Date: Various List of dates: Saint Lucia; 1st Monday in October; October 5, 2026; October 4, 2027; Canada; 2nd Monday in October; October 12, 2026; October 11, 2027; Liberia; 1st Thursday in November; November 5, 2026; November 4, 2027; Norfolk Island; Last Wednesday in November; November 25, 2026; November 24, 2027; United States; 4th Thursday in November; November 26, 2026; November 25, 2027

Thanksgiving or Thanksgiving Day is a national holiday celebrated on various dates in October and November in the United States, Canada, Saint Lucia, and Liberia. It is also observed in the Australian territory of Norfolk Island. It began as a day of giving thanks for the blessings of the harvest and of the preceding year. Various similarly named harvest festival holidays occur throughout the world during autumn. Although Thanksgiving has historical roots in religious and cultural traditions, it has long been celebrated as a secular holiday as well.

== History ==
Prayers of thanks and special thanksgiving ceremonies are common among most religions after harvests and at other times of the year. The Thanksgiving holiday's history in North America is rooted in English traditions dating from the Protestant Reformation. It also has aspects of a harvest festival, even though the harvest in New England occurs well before the late-November date on which the modern Thanksgiving holiday is celebrated in the United States.

In the English tradition, days of thanksgiving and special thanksgiving religious services became important during the English Reformation in the reign of Henry VIII. Before 1536 there were 95 Church holidays, plus every Sunday, when people were required to attend church and forego work. Though the 1536 reforms in the Church of England reduced the number of holidays in the liturgical calendar to 27, the Puritan party in the Anglican Church wished to eliminate all Church holidays apart from the weekly Lord's Day, including the evangelical feasts of Christmas and Easter (cf. Puritan Sabbatarianism). The holidays were to be replaced by specially called Days of Fasting and Days of Thanksgiving, in response to events that the Puritans viewed as acts of special providence. Unexpected disasters or threats of judgement from on high called for Days of Fasting.

Special blessings, viewed as coming from God, called for Days of Thanksgiving, which were observed through Christian church services and other gatherings. For example, Days of Thanksgiving were called following the victory over the Spanish Armada in 1588 and following the deliverance of Queen Anne in 1605. An unusual annual Day of Thanksgiving began in 1606 following the failure of the Gunpowder Plot in 1605 and developed into Guy Fawkes Day on November 5. Days of Fasting were called on account of plagues in 1604 and 1622, drought in 1611, and floods in 1613. Annual Thanksgiving prayers were dictated by the charter of English settlers upon their safe landing in America in 1619 at Berkeley Hundred in Virginia.

=== In Canada ===
According to some historians, the first celebration of Thanksgiving in North America occurred during the 1578 voyage of Martin Frobisher from England in search of the Northwest Passage. Other researchers, however, state that "there is no compelling narrative of the origins of the Canadian Thanksgiving day."

Antecedents for Thanksgiving in Canada are also sometimes traced to the French settlers who came to New France in the 17th century, who celebrated their successful harvests. The French settlers in the area typically had feasts at the end of the harvest season. They continued throughout the winter season, even sharing food with the indigenous peoples of the area.

As settlers arrived in Nova Scotia from New England after 1700, late autumn Thanksgiving celebrations became commonplace. New immigrants into the country—such as the Irish, Scottish, and Germans—also added their own traditions to the harvest celebrations. Most of the U.S. aspects of Thanksgiving (such as the turkey) were incorporated when United Empire Loyalists began to flee from the United States during and after the American Revolution and settled in Canada.

In 1859, the government of the provinces of Canada declared a Thanksgiving Day in which "all Canadians [were asked] to spend the holiday in 'public and solemn' recognition of God's mercies." On 9 October 1879, Canada's Governor General, the Marquis of Lorne, declared November 6 as "a day of General Thanksgiving to Almighty God for the bountiful harvest with which Canada has been blessed." The Canadian Parliament on 31 January 1957 applied the same language in its proclamation for the modern holiday: "A Day of General Thanksgiving to Almighty God for the bountiful harvest with which Canada has been blessed", to be observed on the second Monday in October.

=== In the United States ===
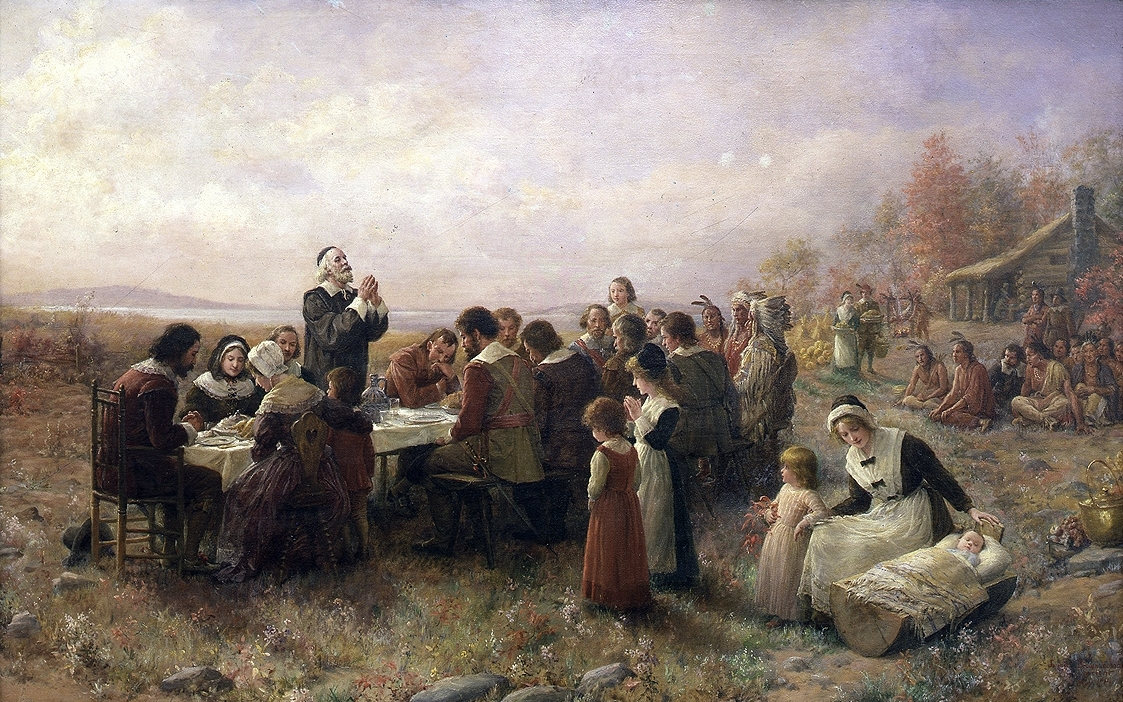
Jennie Augusta Brownscombe's 1914 portrait, The First Thanksgiving at Plymouth, now on display at Pilgrim Hall Museum in Plymouth, Massachusetts

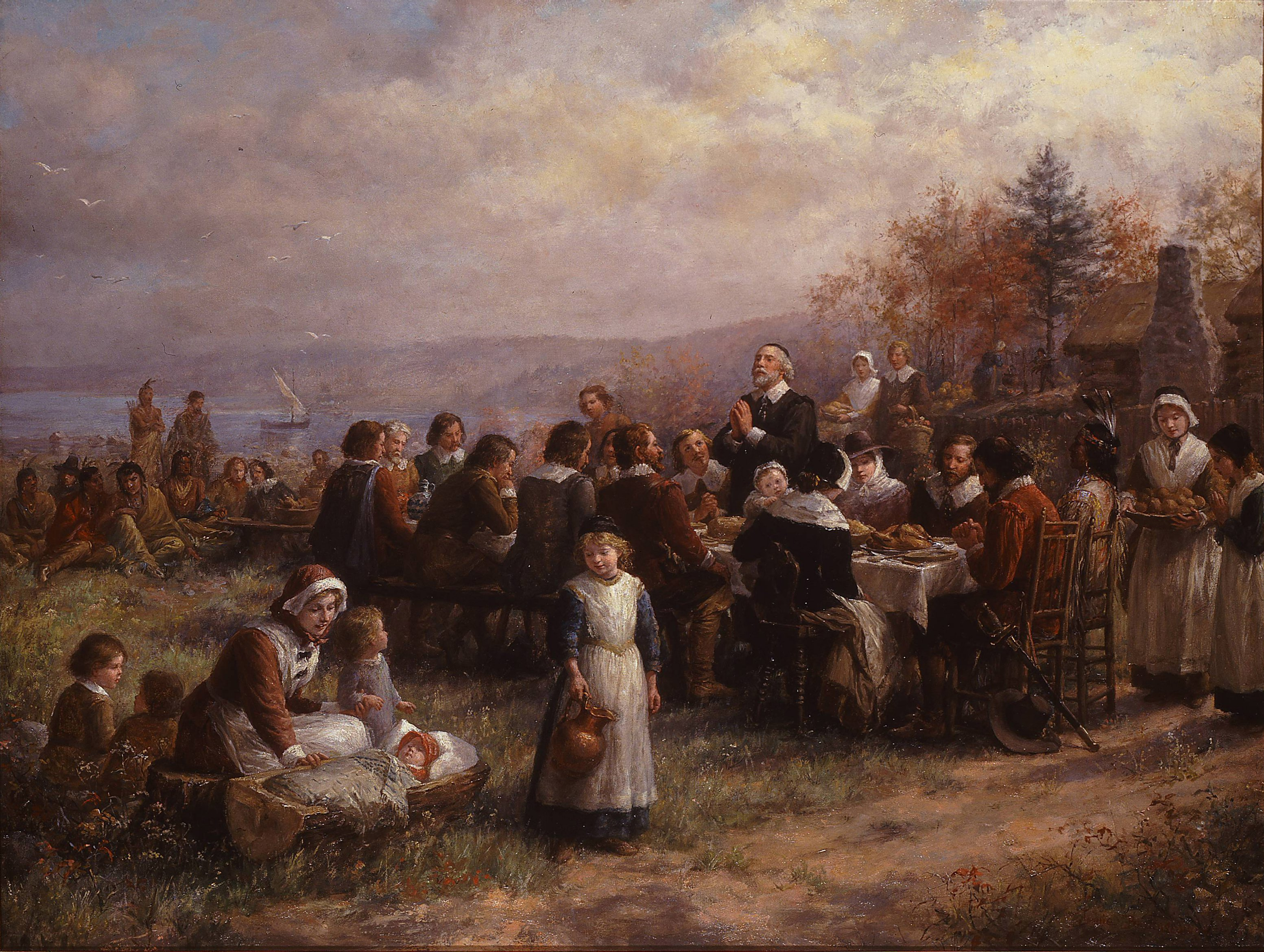
Jennie Augusta Brownscombe's 1925 portrait, Thanksgiving at Plymouth, now on display at the National Museum of Women in the Arts in Washington, D.C.

A family saying grace before Thanksgiving dinner in Neffsville, Pennsylvania in 1942

An annual thanksgiving holiday tradition in North American colonies is documented for the first time in 1619, in what is now called the Commonwealth of Virginia. Thirty-eight English settlers aboard the ship Margaret arrived by way of the James River at Berkeley Hundred in Charles City County, Virginia on December 4, 1619. The landing was immediately followed by a religious celebration, specifically dictated by the group's charter from the London Company. The charter declared, "that the day of our ships arrival at the place assigned for plantation in the land of Virginia shall be yearly and perpetually kept holy as a day of thanksgiving to Almighty God." Since the mid 20th century, the original celebration has been commemorated there annually at present-day Berkeley Plantation, ancestral home of the Harrison family of Virginia.

The more familiar, though historically inaccurate explanation of the origins of the Thanksgiving holiday involves the Pilgrims and Puritans who emigrated from England in the 1620s and 1630s. They brought their previous tradition of days of humiliation and thanksgiving (both of which involved fasting) with them to New England. A multi-day festival in 1621 in Plymouth Colony was prompted by a good harvest, though it was not at the time described as a thanksgiving. The Wampanoag, who had a mutual defense treaty with the colonists, responded in alarm to sounds of ceremonial gunfire, and were welcomed to join the feast. Along with the last surviving Patuxet, the Wampanoag had helped them get through the previous winter by giving them food in that time of scarcity, in exchange for an alliance and protection against the rival Narragansett tribe.

Several celebrations were held in early New England history that have been identified as the "First Thanksgiving", including Pilgrim festivals in Plymouth in 1621 and 1623, and a Puritan holiday in Boston in 1631. Now called 3 Oktoberfeest, Leiden's autumn thanksgiving celebration in 1617 was the occasion for sectarian disturbance that appears to have accelerated the Pilgrims' plans to emigrate to America. The 1621 Plymouth celebration was largely forgotten for hundreds of years and did not contribute to the development of the American holiday. It was retroactively termed "the first Thanksgiving" in a footnote added to an 1841 book by Alexander Young, and the Pilgrim story was then later incorporated into celebrations of the holiday.

Later in New England, religious thanksgiving services were declared by civil leaders such as Governor Bradford, who planned the Plymouth colony's thanksgiving celebration and feast in 1623. The practice of holding an annual harvest festival did not become a regular affair in New England until the late 1660s.

Thanksgiving proclamations were made mostly by church leaders in New England up until 1682, and then by both state and church leaders until after the American Revolution. During the revolutionary period, political influences affected the issuance of Thanksgiving proclamations. Various proclamations were made by royal governors, and conversely by patriot leaders, such as John Hancock, General George Washington, and the Continental Congress, each giving thanks to God for events favorable to their causes. As the first President of the United States, George Washington proclaimed the first nationwide thanksgiving celebration in America marking November 26, 1789 as, "a day of public thanksgiving and prayer, to be observed by acknowledging with grateful hearts the many and signal favours of Almighty God", and calling on Americans to "unite in most humbly offering our prayers and supplications to the great Lord and Ruler of Nations and beseech him to pardon our national and other transgressions."

==== Debate over first celebrations ====
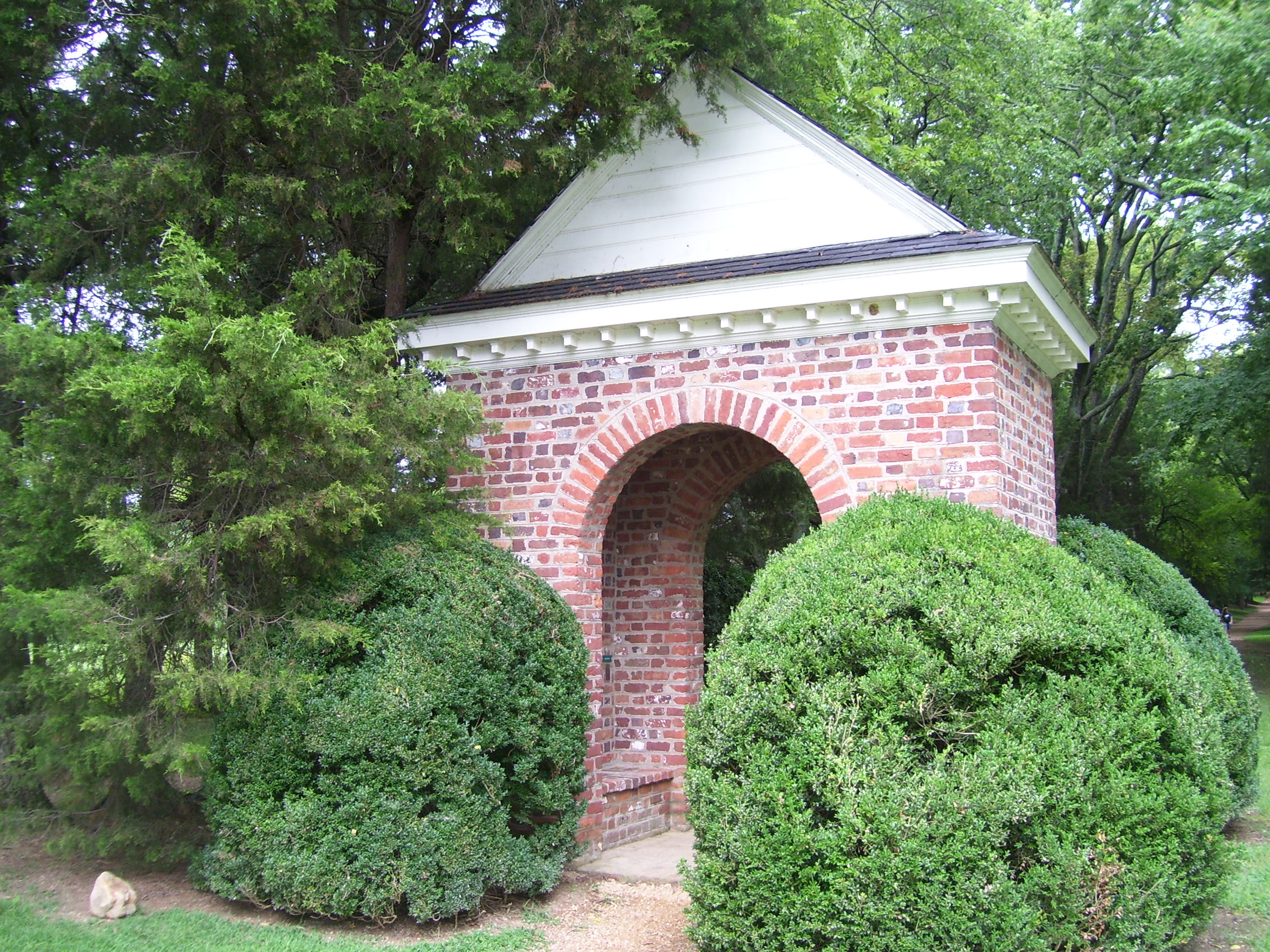
Shrine of the first U.S. Thanksgiving held at Berkeley Hundred in Charles City County, Virginia in 1619

Devotees in Florida, New England, Texas and Virginia have maintained contradictory claims to having held the first Thanksgiving celebration in what became the United States. The question is complicated by the concept of Thanksgiving as either a holiday celebration or a religious service. James Baker maintains, "The American holiday's true origin was the New England Calvinist Thanksgiving. Never coupled with a Sabbath meeting, the Puritan observances were special days set aside during the week for thanksgiving and praise in response to God's providence." Baker calls the debate a "tempest in a beanpot" and "marvelous nonsense" based on regional claims. Momentum for inclusion of Plymouth in the founding myths of the United States was due to the influence of the Old Colony Club, who feared that Plymouth was being overshadowed by events in other colonies, including the American Revolution.

In 1963, President John F. Kennedy acknowledged both the Virginia and Massachusetts claims. Kennedy issued Proclamation 3560 on November 5, 1963, stating, "Over three centuries ago, our forefathers in Virginia and in Massachusetts, far from home in a lonely wilderness, set aside a time of thanksgiving. On the appointed day, they gave reverent thanks for their safety, for the health of their children, for the fertility of their fields, for the love which bound them together, and for the faith which united them with their God."

Other claims include an earlier religious service by Spanish explorers at San Elizario in Texas in 1598. Historians Robyn Gioia and Michael Gannon of the University of Florida argue that the earliest Thanksgiving service in what is now the United States was celebrated by the Spanish community on September 8, 1565, in current Saint Augustine, Florida. The thanksgiving at St. Augustine was celebrated 56 years before the Puritan Pilgrim thanksgiving at Plymouth Plantation (Massachusetts), but it did not become the origin of a national annual tradition.

=== Fixing a date ===
==== Canada ====
The earlier Thanksgiving celebrations in Canada has been attributed to the earlier onset of winter in the North, thus ending the harvest season earlier. Thanksgiving in Canada did not have a fixed date until the late 19th century. Prior to Canadian Confederation, many of the individual colonial governors of the Canadian provinces had declared their own days of Thanksgiving. The first official Canadian Thanksgiving occurred on April 15, 1872, when the nation was celebrating the Prince of Wales' recovery from a serious illness.

By the end of the 19th century, Thanksgiving Day was normally celebrated on November 6 (see also Guy Fawkes Night discussed above). In the late 19th century, the militia staged "sham battles" for public entertainment on Thanksgiving Day. The militia agitated for an earlier date for the holiday, so they could use the warmer weather to draw bigger crowds. However, when the First World War ended, the Armistice Day holiday was usually held during the same week. To prevent the two holidays from clashing with one another, in 1957 the Canadian Parliament proclaimed Thanksgiving to be observed on its present date on the second Monday of October.

==== United States ====
Thanksgiving in the United States has been observed on differing dates. From the time of the Founding Fathers until Abraham Lincoln made it a national holiday in 1863, the date of observance varied from state to state. The final Thursday in November had become the customary date in most U.S. states by the beginning of the 19th century, coinciding with, and eventually superseding the holiday of Evacuation Day (commemorating the day the British exited the United States after the Revolutionary War). Influenced by New Englander Sarah Josepha Hale, who wrote letters to politicians for approximately 40 years advocating an official holiday, Lincoln set national Thanksgiving by proclamation for the final Thursday in November in celebration of the bounties that had continued to fall on the Union and for the military successes in the war, also calling on the American people, "with humble penitence for our national perverseness and disobedience ... fervently implore the interposition of the Almighty hand to heal the wounds of the nation...." Because of the ongoing Civil War, a nationwide Thanksgiving celebration was not realized until Reconstruction in the 1870s.

On October 31, 1939, President Franklin D. Roosevelt signed a presidential proclamation changing the holiday to the next to last Thursday in November in an effort to boost the economy. The earlier date created an extra seven days for Christmas shopping since at that time retailers never began promoting the Christmas season until after Thanksgiving. But making the proclamation so close to the change wreaked havoc on the holiday schedules of many people, schools, and businesses, and most Americans were not in favor of the change. Some of those who opposed the change dubbed the holiday "Franksgiving" that year. Some state governors went along with the change while others stuck with the original November 30 date for the holiday, and three states – Colorado, Mississippi, and Texas – observed both dates. The double Thanksgiving continued for two more years, and then on December 26, 1941, Roosevelt signed a joint resolution of Congress changing the official national Thanksgiving Day to the fourth Thursday in November starting in 1942 (there are usually four but sometimes five Thursdays in November, depending on the year).

Since 1971, when the American Uniform Monday Holiday Act took effect, the American observance of Columbus Day has coincided with the Canadian observance of Thanksgiving.

== Observance ==
=== Australia ===
In the Australian external territory of Norfolk Island, Thanksgiving is celebrated on the last Wednesday of November, similar to the pre–World War II American observance on the last Thursday of the month. Due to the time difference of between 14 and 17 hours, this means the Norfolk Island observance is two days before or five days after the United States' observance. The holiday was brought to the island by visiting American whaling ships.

=== Brazil ===
In Brazil, National Thanksgiving Day (Portuguese: Dia de Ação de Graças) was instituted by President Gaspar Dutra, through Law 781 of August 17, 1949, at the suggestion of Ambassador Joaquim Nabuco, who was enthusiastic about the commemorations he saw in 1909 in St. Patrick's Cathedral as an ambassador in Washington. In 1966, Law 5110 established that the Thanksgiving celebration would take place on the fourth Thursday of November. This date is celebrated by many families of American origin, by some Protestant Christian denominations, such as the Evangelical Lutheran Church of Brazil (which is of American origin), the Presbyterian Church, the Baptist Church, the Methodist Church, and the Church of the Nazarene, and Methodist denominational universities. The day is also celebrated by Evangelical Churches such as the Foursquare Gospel Church in Brazil.

=== Canada ===
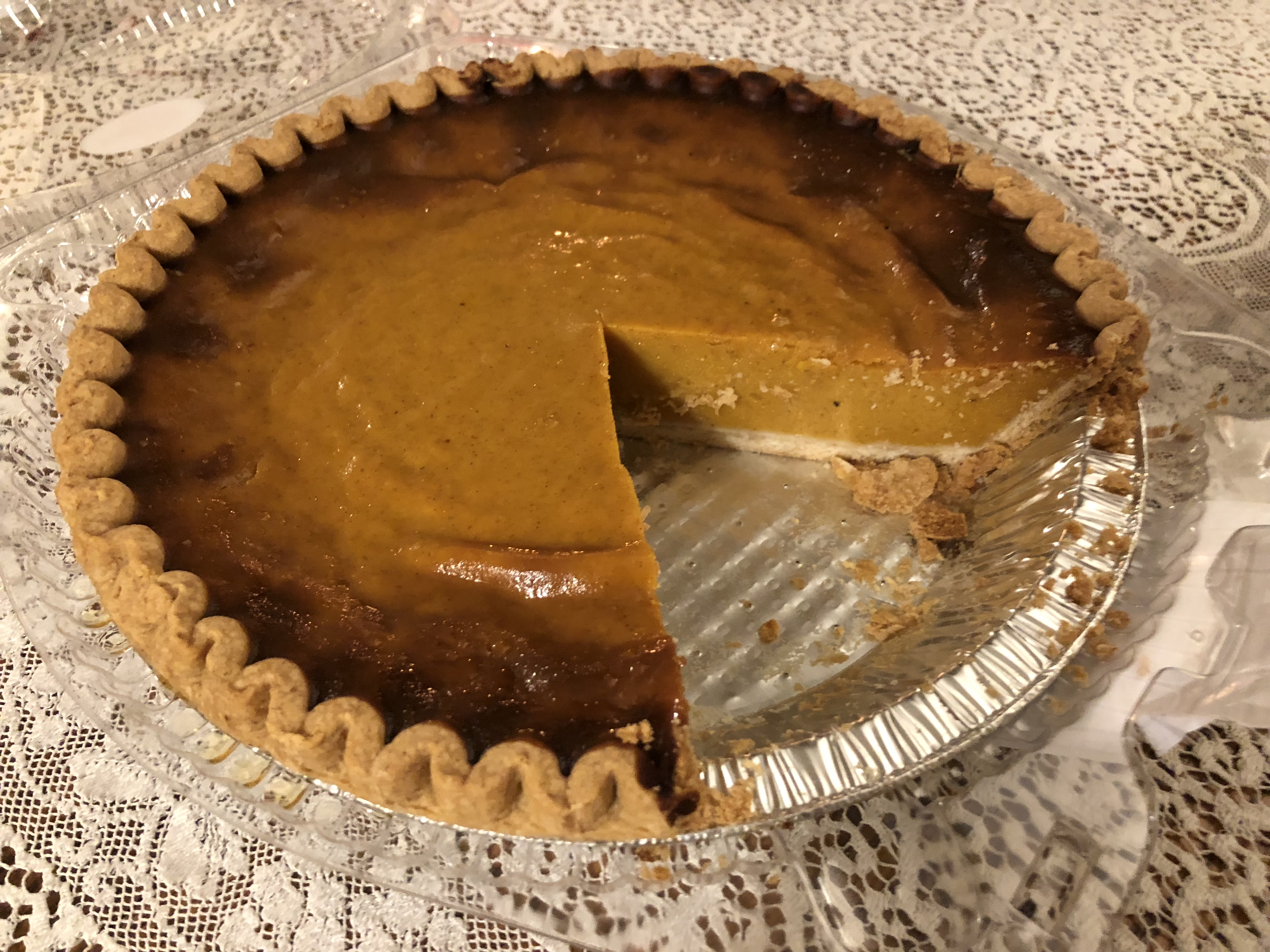
Pumpkin pie, commonly served at Thanksgiving in North America

Thanksgiving (French: l'Action de grâce), occurring on the second Monday in October, is an annual Canadian holiday to give thanks at the close of the harvest season. Although the original act of Parliament references God and the holiday is celebrated in churches, the holiday is mostly celebrated in a secular manner. Thanksgiving is a statutory holiday in all provinces in Canada, except for New Brunswick and Nova Scotia. While businesses may remain open in these provinces, the holiday is nonetheless recognized and celebrated regardless of its status.

=== Germany ===
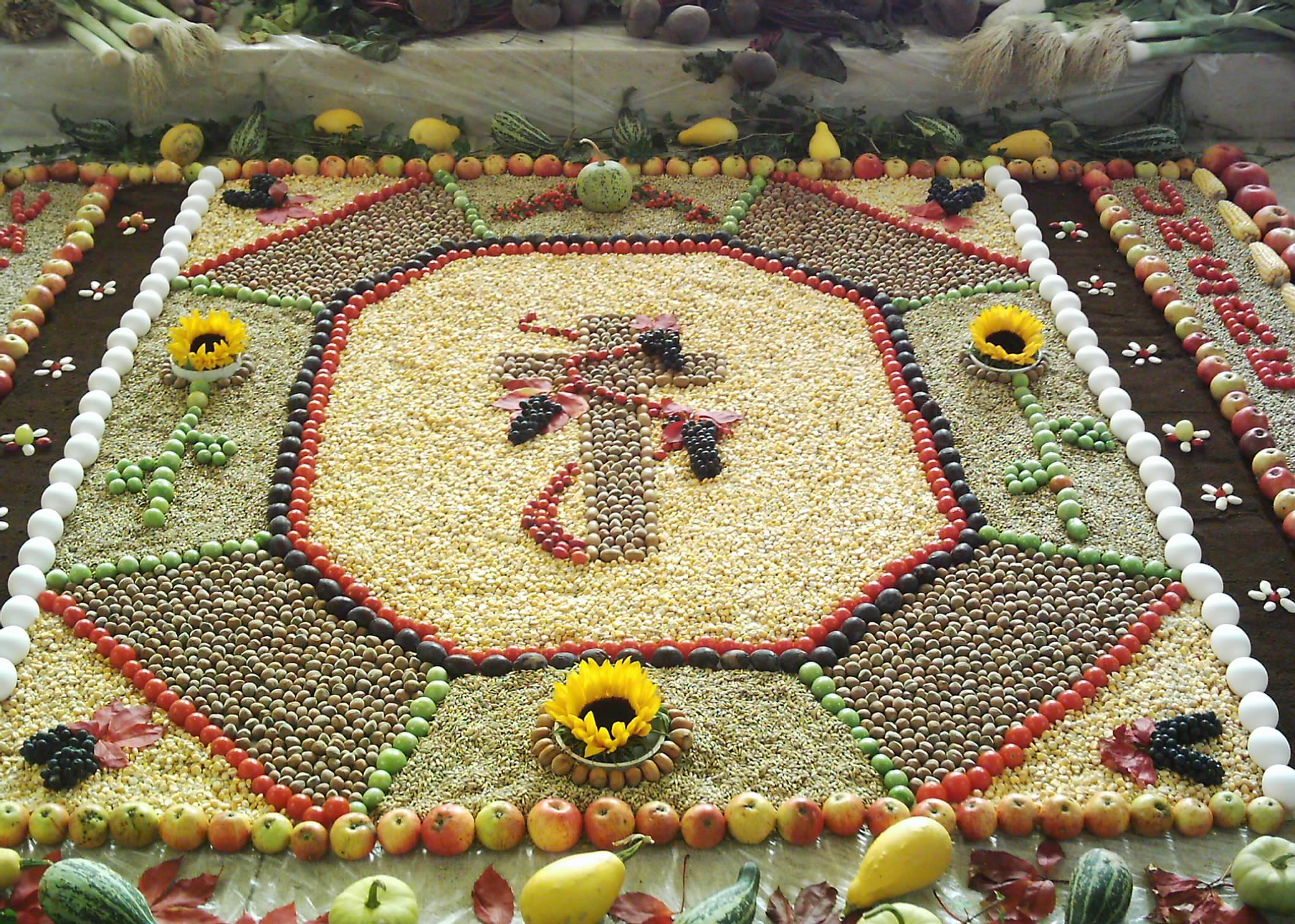
A food decoration for Erntedankfest, a Christian Thanksgiving harvest festival celebrated in Germany

The Harvest Thanksgiving Festival, Erntedankfest, is a popular Christian festival in some German municipalities on the first Sunday of October. The festival has a significant religious Christian component, and many churches are decorated with autumn crops. Erntedankfest is celebrated through the attendance of Christian church services, as well as religious processions or parades.

=== Grenada ===
In the West Indian island of Grenada, in the Caribbean, there is a national holiday known as Thanksgiving Day which is celebrated on October 25. Even though it bears the same name, and is celebrated at roughly the same time as the American and Canadian versions of Thanksgiving, this holiday is unrelated to either of those celebrations. Instead, the holiday marks the anniversary of the U.S.-led invasion of the island in 1983, in response to the deposition and execution of the socialist Grenadian Prime Minister Maurice Bishop by a military government from within his own party.

=== Japan ===
Labor Thanksgiving Day (勤労感謝の日, Kinrō Kansha no Hi) is a national holiday in Japan. It takes place annually on November 23. The law establishing the holiday, which was adopted during the American occupation after World War II, cites it as an occasion for commemorating labor and production and giving each other thanks. It has roots in the ancient Shinto harvest ceremony (Niiname-sai (新嘗祭)).

=== Liberia ===
In the West African country of Liberia, Thanksgiving is celebrated on the first Thursday of November. In 1883, the Legislature of Liberia enacted a statute declaring this day as a national holiday. Thanksgiving is celebrated in the country in large part due to the nation's founding as a colony of the American Colonization Society in 1821 by former slaves and free people of color from the United States. However, the Liberian celebration of the holiday is notably different from the American celebration. While some Liberian families choose to celebrate with a feast or cook out, it is not considered a staple of the holiday and there is no specific food heavily associated with Thanksgiving. Some choose to celebrate the holiday by attending religious ceremonies, while others take it as a day for relaxation. Others view the holiday as an imposition from the American settlers of the country. In the years following the second civil war, some Liberians have taken the holiday as a time to be thankful for this new period peace and relative stability.

=== Netherlands ===
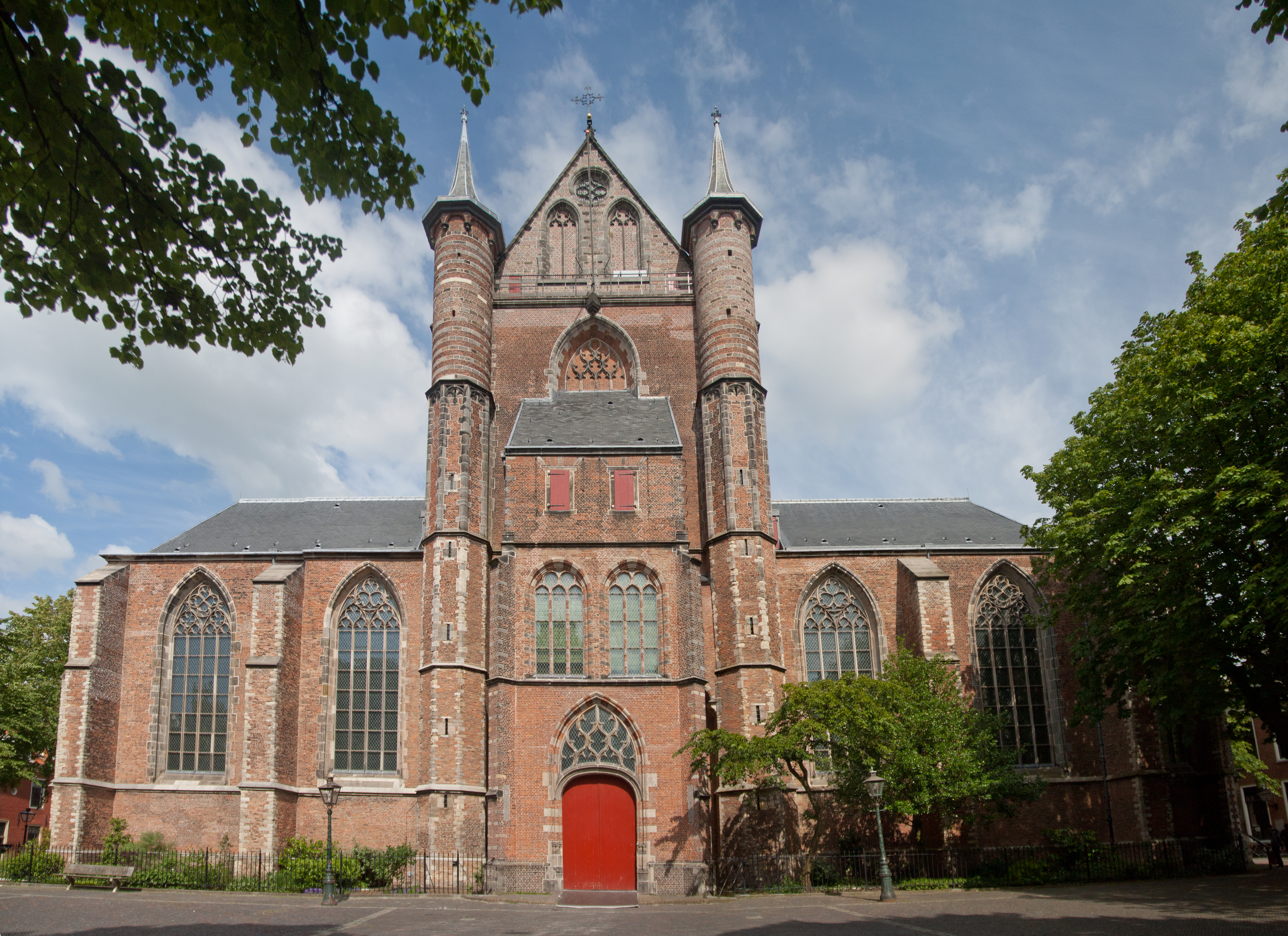
Pieterskerk

Many of the Pilgrims who migrated to the Plymouth Plantation resided in Leiden from 1609 to 1620, and had recorded their births, marriages, and deaths at the Pieterskerk. In commemoration, a non-denominational Thanksgiving Day service is held each year on the morning of the American Thanksgiving Day in the Pieterskerk, a Gothic church in Leiden, noting the hospitality the Pilgrims received in Leiden on their way to the New World.

Thanksgiving is observed by orthodox Protestant churches in the Netherlands on the first Wednesday in November (Dankdag). It is not a public holiday. Those who observe the day either go to church in the evening or take the day off and go to church in the morning (and occasionally afternoon) too.

=== Philippines ===
As an American colony from 1901 to 1946, the Philippines observed Thanksgiving as a special public holiday on the same day as the United States. During the Japanese occupation in World War II, both Americans and Filipinos celebrated Thanksgiving in secret. After the Japanese defeat in 1945, the tradition continued until 1969. In 1973, President Ferdinand Marcos issued Proclamation 1180, changing the date to September 21, altering the holiday as a celebration of his imposition of martial law a year prior. This continued until Marcos' ouster in 1986. Since the Fifth Republic, with no proclamations declaring the observance of Thanksgiving, it is no longer a public holiday in the country.

=== Saint Lucia ===
The nation of Saint Lucia celebrates Thanksgiving on the first Monday in October.

=== Sweden ===
An Evangelical-Lutheran Thanksgiving Mass at Hedvig Eleonora Church (top); the chancel of the Hedvig Eleonora Church is decorated for the holy day (bottom).

Thanksigiving is observed liturgically in the Evangelical-Lutheran Church of Sweden; it is known as Tacksägelsedagen and celebrated annually on the second Sunday in October.

=== United Kingdom ===
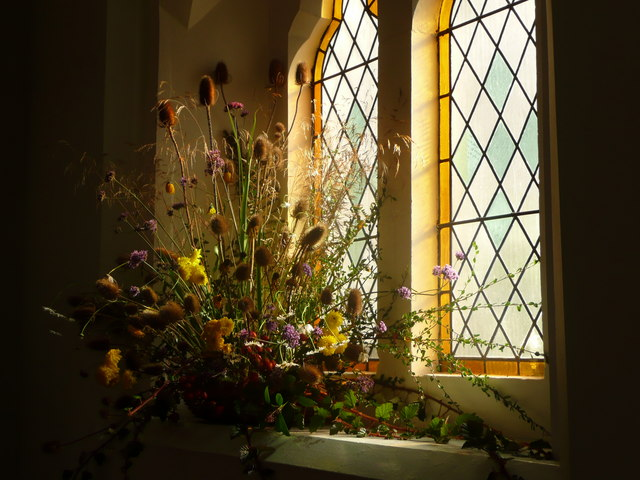
Harvest Festival flowers at a church in Shrewsbury, England

The Harvest Festival of Thanksgiving does not have an official date in the United Kingdom; however, it is traditionally held on or near the Sunday of the harvest moon that occurs closest to the autumnal equinox. Harvest Thanksgiving in Britain also has pre-Christian roots when the Saxons would offer the first sheaf of barley, oats, or wheat to fertility gods. When the harvest was finally collected, communities would come together for a harvest supper. When Christianity arrived in Britain many traditions remained, and today the Harvest Festival is marked by churches and schools in late September/early October (same as Canada) with singing, praying and decorating with baskets of food and fruit to celebrate a successful harvest and to give thanks. Collections of food are usually held which are then given to local charities which help the homeless and those in need.

Historically, the Eastern Counties celebration of hockey (more recently spelled "horkey" to distinguish it from the sport of the same name) bore a close resemblance to Thanksgiving feasts. It was already a nostalgic celebration of bygone traditions by the 19th century, and died out in the 1920s.

American Thanksgiving has grown in popularity in the United Kingdom in the 2020s, driven by the presence of American expatriates in the country, the appeal of the holiday's cuisine, its depiction in media, and Britons' embrace of the holiday's purpose of gratitude and generosity.

=== United States ===
Autumnal colors are commonly associated with Thanksgiving.

In the United States, Thanksgiving is an annual tradition that was federally formalized through an 1863 presidential proclamation by Abraham Lincoln, but was implemented as state legislation since the nation's founding.

In 1941, federal legislation by the United States Congress formalized Thanksgiving on the fourth Thursday in November.

The holiday traditionally has been a celebration of the blessings of the year, including the harvest. On Thanksgiving Day, it is common for Americans to share a family meal, attend church services, and view special sporting events.

Thanksgiving is celebrated in public places with parades such as Macy's Thanksgiving Parade in New York City, ABC Dunkin' Donuts Thanksgiving Day Parade in Philadelphia, America's Hometown Thanksgiving Parade in Plymouth, Massachusetts, McDonald's Thanksgiving Parade in Chicago, and Bayou Classic Thanksgiving Parade in New Orleans.

What Americans call the "Holiday Season" generally begins with Thanksgiving. The first day after Thanksgiving Day—Black Friday—marks the start of the Christmas shopping season.

Thanksgiving is usually celebrated with a family meal. Beginning in the 2010s, a new tradition has emerged to also celebrate Thanksgiving with a meal with friends, as a separate event on a different day or an alternate event on Thanksgiving Day. This is referred to as Friendsgiving.

== See also ==
- Cyber Monday – Monday after the Thanksgiving holiday
- List of films set around Thanksgiving
- List of harvest festivals
- Thanksgiving Parade

== Sources ==
- Baker, James W. (2009). Thanksgiving: The Biography of an American Holiday. UPNE. ISBN 978-1-58465-801-6.
- Bangs, Jeremy D. "Thanksgiving on the Net: Roast Bull with Cranberry Sauce". Sail 1620. Society of Mayflower Descendants in the Commonwealth of Pennsylvania. Archived from the original on November 2, 2012.
- Colman, Penny (2008). Thanksgiving: The True Story. Macmillan. p. 149. ISBN 978-0805082296.
- Dow, Judy; Slapin, Beverly (June 12, 2006). "Deconstructing the Myths of "The First Thanksgiving"". Oyate.org. Archived from the original on November 29, 2010.
- Hillstrom, Laurie Collier (2007). The Thanksgiving book: a companion to the holiday covering its history, lore, ... Omnigraphics. p. 328. ISBN 978-0780804036.
- Hodgson, Godfrey (2006). A Great and Godly Adventure; The Pilgrims and the Myth of the First Thanksgiving. New York: Public Affairs. p. 212. ISBN 978-1586483739.
