= Days of humiliation and thanksgiving =

Public observances in Protestant Christianity

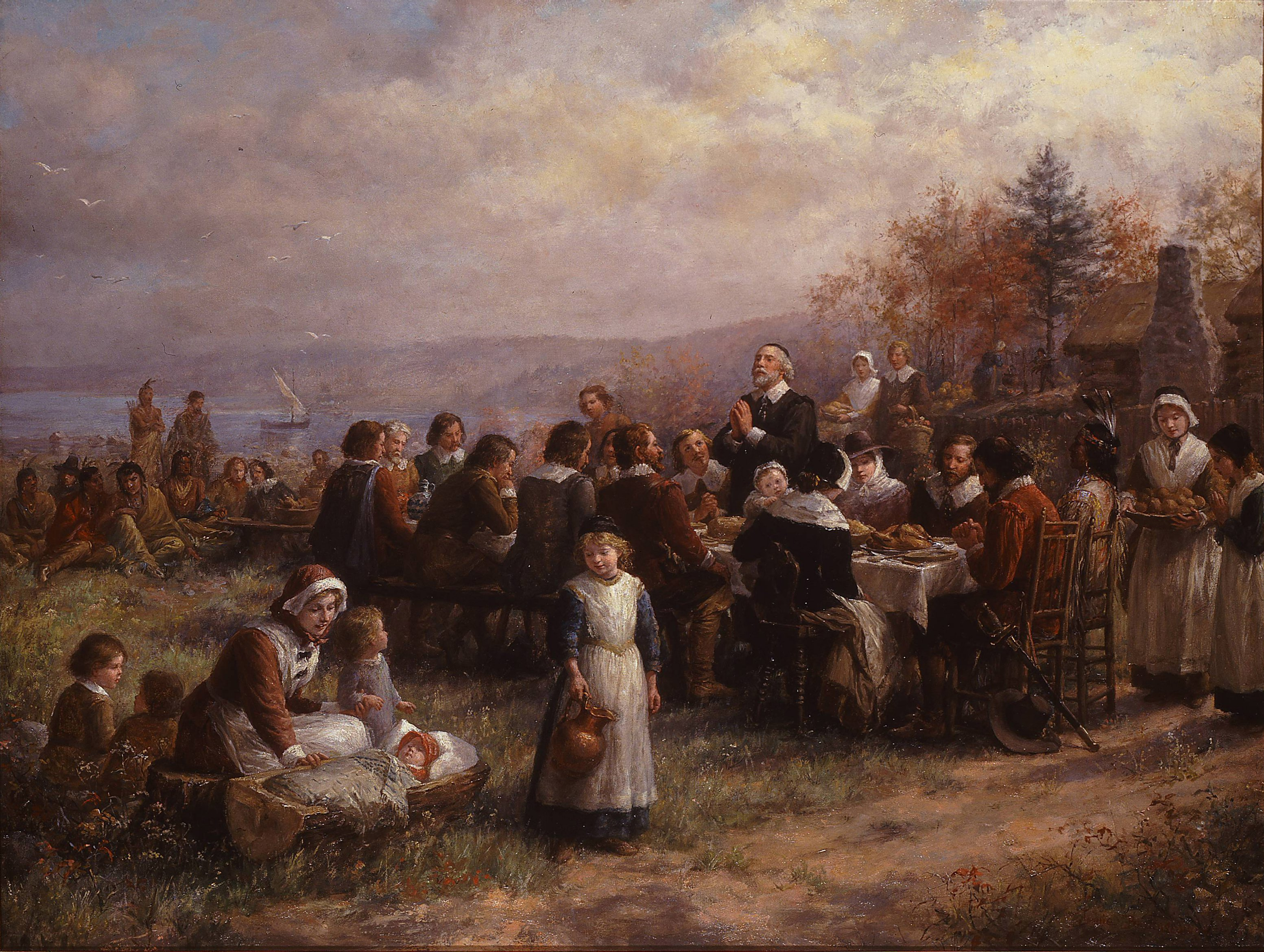
Thanksgiving at Plymouth, oil on canvas by Jennie Augusta Brownscombe, 1925, National Museum of Women in the Arts

Puritans rejected the traditional Christian liturgical calendar of holy days, including Easter and Christmas, as well as saints' days, but set aside special days to thank God, as well as days of prayer and fasting. (Note: The Christian liturgical calendar is observed by denominations such as the Catholic Church, Lutheran Churches, and Anglican Communion, among others.) Days of thanksgiving and days of humiliation were public observances in Protestant Christianity, particularly among Puritan communities in early modern England and colonial America. A day of humiliation or fasting was a publicly proclaimed day of fasting and prayer in response to an event thought to signal God's judgement. A day of thanksgiving was a day set aside for public worship in thanksgiving for events believed to signal God's mercy and favor. Such a day might be proclaimed by the civil authority or the church.

== Days of humiliation and fasting ==
A day of humiliation and fasting might be proclaimed for a variety of reasons, for example, in response to a drought, flood, fire, military defeat, or plague. They might also be held before the undertaking of a difficult endeavor. These days of humiliation and fasting consisted of different norms. As a part of fasting, people abstained from food and other pleasures as a sign of repentance. Individuals and congregations gathered for special prayers to ask for Gods forgiveness and ask for further guidance. Everyone between the age of sixteen and sixty were expected to attend the church services and all other activities associated with the day. As the sermons were mostly focused on acknowledging sins, people were expected to search themselves for sin and to repent in order to appease God's wrath. The Puritans believed that one individual had the ability to corrupt everyone else and bring God's wrath onto the entire town. For this reason it was important that the entire community participated in days of humiliation and fasting. Due to this belief, towns were especially careful when deciding who was able to move into their town. People with bad reputations or anyone who raised a red flag was prohibited from moving in and potentially bringing bad fortune upon the entire community.

== Days of thanksgiving ==
A day of thanksgiving might be held in response to signs of God's mercy, such as rain allowing a good harvest, arrival of needed supplies, or recovery from sickness. They might also be held after a long period of general success and lack of disaster. On days of thanksgiving, the faithful would also spend the day in church attendance, but would pray thankfully, sing psalms of praise, and feast. Puritan feast days were more solemn and demanding than traditional Christian feasts. These days of observance were seen not only as expressions of gratitude for recent blessings, but also as hopeful anticipations of the coming of the Kingdom of God. Thanksgiving observances also served to strengthen community bonds through charitable acts toward those in need, reflecting the Puritan commitment to moral responsibility and collective well-being.

== History ==
=== Early history ===
The observance of days of humiliation and thanksgiving are seen in the Bible. In the Old Testament, numerous Thanksgiving accounts are mentioned, including those of Prophet Noah, King David, King Hezekiah, Prophet Nehemiah, and Prophet Daniel; similarly, the early Christians also thanked God for their blessings.

National days of prayer for specific occasions had been ordered in England as early as 1009 by King Æthelred the Unready. Occasional days of fasting were held in England in the middle of the sixteenth century under Elizabeth I in response to plague outbreaks and the Armada Crisis of 1588. Puritans especially embraced occasional days of fasting. When English Puritans and other settlers came to North America, they brought their religious customs with them. This translated directly in to the New England colonies, where settlers observed days of humiliation and fasting as well as days of thanksgiving, depending on circumstances. By the middle of the seventeenth century, days of thanksgiving were celebrated in New England annually in November.

=== From colonial observances to national holiday ===
Saying grace before carving a turkey at Thanksgiving dinner, Pennsylvania, U.S., 1942

The Christian tradition of celebrating days of thanksgiving would later influence modern America and assist in creating a national Thanksgiving holiday. Early colonial proclamations like the ones that took place in Plymouth and Massachusetts Bay, acted as a foundation for what would later become a national observance. As the American colonies continued to develop, thanksgiving observances became more widespread. By the late 18th and early 19th centuries many states had adopted annual thanksgiving celebrations. These celebrations usually took place in late autumn to properly align with the harvest season. The tradition gained national significance in the newly formed United States. Both George Washington and Abraham Lincoln issued proclamations for a national day of thanksgiving within November. These proclamations provided the basis for the custom to etch its place in American culture and begin a standardized national holiday of Thanksgiving for the purpose of "giving thanks to God for blessings received during the year". Thanksgiving is celebrated through "feasting and prayer".

Likewise, in 1859, the government of the provinces of Canada declared a Thanksgiving Day in which "all Canadians [were asked] to spend the holiday in 'public and solemn' recognition of God's mercies." On 9 October 1879, Canada's Governor General, the Marquis of Lorne, declared November 6 as "a day of General Thanksgiving to Almighty God for the bountiful harvest with which Canada has been blessed." The Canadian Parliament on 31 January 1957 applied the same language in its proclamation for the modern holiday: "A Day of General Thanksgiving to Almighty God for the bountiful harvest with which Canada has been blessed", to be observed on the second Monday in October.

== See also ==
- Day of Prayer
- National Day of Prayer

== Bibliography ==
- Baker, James W. (2010). Thanksgiving: The Biography of an American Holiday. Durham: University of New Hampshire Press. ISBN 9781584658740 – via Project MUSE.
- Bates, Lucy-Ann (2012). Nationwide Fast and Thanksgiving Days in England, 1640-1660 (Ph.D. thesis). Durham University.
- Durston, Christopher (1992). "'For the Better Humiliation of the People': Public Days of Fasting and Thanksgiving During the English Revolution". The Seventeenth Century. 7 (2): 129–149. doi:10.1080/0268117X.1992.10555340.
- Hambrick-Stowe, Charles E. (1982). The Practice of Piety: Puritan Devotional Disciplines in Seventeenth-Century New England. Chapel Hill, NC: University of North Carolina Press.
