= Remembering Bo =

2006 television special by WXYZ-TV

Remembering Bo is a sixty-minute television special aired annually on WXYZ-TV, Channel 7 in Detroit, Michigan since 2006. The special was first televised on November 17, 2006, the date of Bo Schembechler's death. It is hosted by former WXYZ-TV sports director Don Shane.

This documentary is televised annually, airing immediately after WXYZ's broadcast of the City of Detroit's Christmas tree lighting, as well as, until 2024, sometimes on Christmas Day prior to ABC's National Basketball Association coverage.

It focuses on the life and career of Schembechler, including his football coaching career, which included 21 seasons as head coach of the University of Michigan Wolverines football team, as well as stints as president of the Detroit Tigers and his co-hosting of Big Ten Ticket, Channel 7's football pregame show. Because Big Ten Ticket is rarely broadcast in reruns, WXYZ had to throw together clips from past episodes of the series in order to create the special. Also included are highlights of Michigan Wolverines games coached by Schembechler.

The special is currently unavailable on DVD. Shane retired as sports director in 2012, and was replaced as sports director and cohost of Big Ten Ticket by Tom Leyden.
