= Thanksgiving Parade =

Thanksgiving Parade may refer to the following annual parades that take place on Thanksgiving Day currently, previously, or originally presented by department stores:

- 6abc Dunkin' Donuts Thanksgiving Day Parade, a parade held in Philadelphia, started in 1920, originally presented by Gimbels
- Macy's Thanksgiving Day Parade, a parade held in New York City, started in 1924, presented by Macy's
- America's Thanksgiving Parade, a parade held in Detroit, Michigan; started in 1924, originally presented by The J.L. Hudson Company
- Chicago Thanksgiving Parade, a parade in Chicago, Illinois; started in 1933, previously presented by Marshall Field's
- Novant Health Thanksgiving Day Parade, a parade held in Charlotte, North Carolina; started in 1947, presented by Belk
- H-E-B Thanksgiving Day Parade, a parade held in Houston; started in 1949, originally presented by Foley's

Ubs Thanksgiving Day Parade, a parade held in Stamford, Connecticut.

- America's Hometown Thanksgiving Parade, a parade held in Plymouth, Massachusetts; started in 1996
- Kitchener–Waterloo Oktoberfest Thanksgiving Parade, a parade held in Kitchener-Waterloo, Ontario; held on Canadian Thanksgiving

== See also ==
- List of Christmas and holiday season parades
