= Franksgiving =

Derisive term for FDR's changing Thanksgiving date

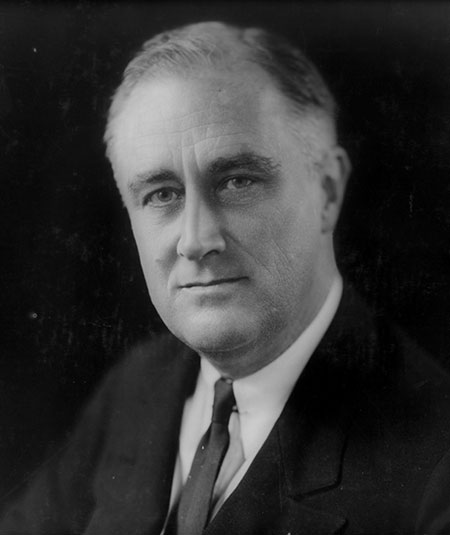
Franklin Delano Roosevelt in 1933

In 1939, American President Franklin D. Roosevelt moved the Thanksgiving holiday earlier by one week, to the second-to-last Thursday in November. This change was intended to help boost the economy by providing an extra seven days for Christmas shopping. However, this decision led to significant public backlash, with many people deriding the holiday as Franksgiving. The term Franksgiving, a portmanteau of Franklin and Thanksgiving, was coined by Charles D. White, the mayor of Atlantic City, in the same year. In late 1941, Congress approved and Roosevelt signed a proclamation officially designating Thanksgiving as the fourth Thursday in November.

== History ==
George Washington was the first president to proclaim a Thanksgiving holiday in 1789. Then, in 1863, during the Civil War, Abraham Lincoln established the last Thursday of November as the official date for Thanksgiving to be celebrated each year. Following this tradition, every president thereafter declared a general day of Thanksgiving to be observed on the last Thursday in November. However, in 1939, during the Great Depression, November had five Thursdays, and the last one fell on November 30, which left little time for the Christmas shopping season. To address this concern, in August 1939, President Franklin D. Roosevelt decided to break from tradition and issued an executive order declaring that Thanksgiving would be celebrated on November 23 instead of November 30. Fred Lazarus Jr., the head of Federated Department Stores (which would later become Macy's, Inc.), urged Roosevelt to move Thanksgiving to a week earlier, to the second-to-last Thursday in November instead of the last Thursday in November. The goal was to extend the Christmas shopping season and help boost retail sales. At that time, it was generally frowned upon for retailers to display Christmas decorations or hold Christmas sales prior to Thanksgiving—a trend later referred to as "Christmas creep." Statistics indicated that most people did not begin their Christmas shopping until after Thanksgiving, which concerned business leaders. They feared that, particularly during the Depression, they would lose sales because there were only 24 shopping days between Thanksgiving and Christmas.

The plan encountered immediate opposition. Alf Landon, Roosevelt's Republican challenger in the preceding election, called the declaration "another illustration of the confusion which [Roosevelt's] impulsiveness has caused so frequently during his administration. If the change has any merit at all, more time should have been taken working it out... instead of springing it upon an unprepared country with the omnipotence of a Hitler." While not all critics were political opponents of the president, most parts of New England (then a Republican stronghold relative to the rest of the nation) were among the most vocal areas. James Frasier, the chairman of the selectmen of Plymouth, Massachusetts "heartily disapproved".

The short-notice change in dates affected the holiday plans of millions of Americans. For example, many college football teams routinely ended their seasons with rivalry games on Thanksgiving, and had scheduled them that year for the last day in November; some athletic conferences had rules permitting games only through the Saturday following Thanksgiving. If the date were changed, many of these teams would play their games in empty stadiums or not at all. The change also caused problems for college registrars, schedulers, and calendar makers. Some retailers were pleased because they hoped the extra week of Christmas shopping would increase profits, but smaller businesses complained they would lose business to larger stores.

A late 1939 Gallup poll indicated that Democrats favored the switch 52% to 48%, while Republicans opposed it 79% to 21%, and that Americans overall opposed the change 62% to 38%.

After announcing August 31, 1939, that he would similarly designate November 21, 1940 (the next year), Roosevelt issued on October 31 his official proclamation calling for "a day of general thanksgiving" on November 23. Such declarations amount to using the "moral authority" of the Presidency, and each state government can independently determine when to cancel work for state (and in some cases, municipal) employees. Twenty-three states' governments and the District of Columbia recognized the non-traditional date, twenty-two states preserved the traditional date on November 30, and the remaining three – Colorado, Mississippi, and Texas – gave holidays in both weeks.

In 1940, 32 states' governments and the District of Columbia observed the earlier date on November 21, while 16 states chose what some were calling the "Republican" Thanksgiving on the 28th.

A 1941 Commerce Department survey found no significant expansion of retail sales due to the change. November of that year once again saw 32 states and the District of Columbia observing the holiday on the 20th, while the remaining 16 states did so on the 27th.

Roughly two in seven last Thursdays of November are the fifth Thursday of that month; in 1939, the fourth (but second to last) Thursday had been named in the presidential proclamation, in place of that year's fifth (and last) Thursday. The second and third of the then non-traditional Thanksgivings remain outliers. Specifically, the presidential proclamation of November 9, 1940 and November 8, 1941, called for observances on November 21, 1940, and November 20, 1941, respectively, the third (and second to last) Thursdays. Every such holiday in the 20th century until 1939 had fit into the former tradition and each year from 1942 on employed the traditional fourth-Thursday celebration.

In December 1941, following the United States' entry into World War II, Congress approved a proclamation that President Roosevelt signed. This proclamation designated the federal Thanksgiving Day holiday as the fourth Thursday in November, starting in 1942. As a result, Thanksgiving would now be celebrated between November 22 and 28. (Before this declaration, the term "Thanksgiving Day" had only appeared in presidential proclamations during Calvin Coolidge's first term, among his six proclamations.) In November 1942, Roosevelt’s proclamation acknowledged the joint resolution and confirmed the established date for Thanksgiving Day, calling for a moment of observance "in prayer" for both Thanksgiving and the forthcoming New Year's Day.

The majority of states immediately changed their laws to coincide with the nationally observed date. The first year following the joint resolution with five Thursdays in November was 1944, and Thanksgiving was observed on the 23rd of the month except in the states of Arkansas, Florida, Georgia, Idaho, Nebraska, Tennessee, Texas, and Virginia. (The nation was in the midst of World War II, and most nationwide celebrations as well as many regional ones were on hiatus at the time. It would not be until after the end of the war, 1945, that the new date of Thanksgiving would fully take root.) Also in 1945, 1950, 1951, and 1956, November had five Thursdays. Texas was the last state to change its law, observing the last Thursday of Thanksgiving for the final time in 1956.

== In media ==
In a number of popular radio shows of the time, such as those featuring Burns and Allen and Jack Benny, the confusion over when to observe Thanksgiving Day was the source for jokes.

In the 1940 Warner Bros. Merrie Melodies cartoon Holiday Highlights, directed by Tex Avery, the introduction to a segment about Thanksgiving shows the holiday falling on two different dates, one "for Democrats" and one a week later "for Republicans".

The competing dates for Thanksgiving are parodied in the 1942 film Holiday Inn. In the film, a November calendar appears on which an animated turkey jumps back and forth between the two weeks, until he gives up and shrugs his shoulders at the audience. This animated turkey has also been used as a graphic interchange format (GIF) on some Reddit accounts in the 2020s.

In the 1940 Three Stooges short film No Census, No Feeling, Curly makes mention of the Fourth of July being in October. When Moe questions him, Curly replies, "You never can tell. Look what they did to Thanksgiving!"
