= List of films set around Thanksgiving =

This is a list of films set on or around the American Thanksgiving holiday. It does not include Thanksgiving television specials.

== Action ==
- Below Utopia (aka Body Count), a 1997 film starring Justin Theroux, Alyssa Milano, and Ice-T
- Spider-Man, a 2002 film directed by Sam Raimi

== Animated ==
- Feedin' the Kiddie, a 1957 short film directed by William Hanna and Joseph Barbera
- Free Birds, a 2013 film directed by Jimmy Hayward
- Holiday for Drumsticks, a 1949 short film directed by Arthur Davis
- Jerky Turkey, a 1945 short film directed by Tex Avery
- The Little Orphan, a 1949 short film directed by William Hanna and Joseph Barbera
- Pilgrim Popeye, a 1951 short film directed by Isadore Sparber
- Pilgrim Porky, a 1940 short film directed by Robert Clampett
- Tom Turk and Daffy, a 1944 short film directed by Chuck Jones

== Comedy ==
- Addams Family Values, a 1993 film directed by Barry Sonnenfeld
- Alice's Restaurant, a 1969 film directed by Arthur Penn
- An Ache in Every Stake, a 1941 Three Stooges short film
- Beethoven, a 1992 film directed by Brian Levant
- Broadway Danny Rose, a 1984 film written and directed by Woody Allen
- Cold Turkey, a 2013 film written and directed by Will Slocombe
- Diary of a Mad Housewife, a 1970 film directed by Frank Perry
- Down and Out in Beverly Hills, a 1986 film written and directed by Paul Mazursky
- Dutch, a 1991 film written by John Hughes and directed by Peter Faiman
- For Keeps, a 1988 film directed by John G. Avildsen
- For Your Consideration, a 2006 film written and directed by Christopher Guest
- Friendsgiving, a 2020 film written and directed by Nicol Paone
- Funny People, a 2009 film cowritten and directed by Judd Apatow
- The Gold Rush, a 1925 film written by, directed by, and starring Charlie Chaplin
- Gone Fishin', a 1997 film directed by Christopher Cain and written by J. J. Abrams and Jill Mazursky.
- Grumpy Old Men, a 1993 film directed by Donald Petrie
- Hanging Up, a 2000 film directed by and starring Diane Keaton
- Hannah and Her Sisters, a 1986 film written and directed by Woody Allen
- Home for the Holidays, a 1995 film directed by Jodie Foster
- Honey, I Shrunk the Kids, a 1989 film directed by Joe Johnston
- The House of Yes, a 1997 film directed by Mark Waters
- Instant Family, a 2018 film directed by Sean Anders
- Jack and Jill, a 2011 film directed by Dennis Dugan
- Mistress America, a 2015 film directed by Noah Baumbach
- Most Guys Are Losers, a 2020 film directed by Eric Ustian
- My Blue Heaven, a 1990 film directed by Herbert Ross
- National Lampoon's Thanksgiving Family Reunion, a 2003 television film directed by Neal Israel
- Nobody's Fool, a 1994 film directed by Robert Benton
- Not Cool, a 2014 film directed by Shane Dawson
- The Oath, a 2018 film directed by Ike Barinholtz
- The Object of My Affection, a 1998 film directed by Nicholas Hytner
- The Other Sister, a 1999 film directed by Garry Marshall
- Palo Alto, a 2007 film directed by Brad Leong
- Paul Blart Mall Cop, a 2009 film directed by Steve Carr
- Pieces of April, a 2003 film written and directed by Peter Hedges
- Planes, Trains and Automobiles, a 1987 film written, produced, and directed by John Hughes
- Primary Colors, a 1998 film directed by Mike Nichols
- The Prince & Me, a 2004 film directed by Martha Coolidge
- She's Gotta Have It, a 1986 film written and directed by Spike Lee
- Smart People, a 2008 film written by Mark Poirier and directed by Noam Murro
- Somebody Killed Her Husband, a 1978 film directed by Lamont Johnson
- Son in Law, a 1993 film directed by Steve Rash
- The Star-Crossed Romance of Josephine Cosnowski, a 1985 television film written by Jean Shepherd and directed by Fred Barzyk
- Starting Over, a 1979 film directed by Alan J. Pakula
- Sweet Hearts Dance, a 1988 film directed by Robert Greenwald
- Sweethearts, a 2024 film directed by Jordan Weiss.
- Tadpole, a 2002 American film directed by Gary Winick
- Tower Heist, a 2011 film directed by Brett Ratner
- The Turkey Bowl, a 2019 film directed by Greg Coolidge
- Turkey Drop, a 2019 TV film directed by Jerry Ciccoritti
- What's Cooking?, a 2000 film directed by Gurinder Chadha
- Youth in Revolt, a 2009 film directed by Miguel Arteta
- You've Got Mail, a 1998 film written and directed by Nora Ephron

== Documentary ==
- The Last Waltz, a 1978 documentary film directed by Martin Scorsese about The Band's farewell concert, which took place on Thanksgiving Day in 1976
- American Movie, a 1999 documentary film directed by Chris Smith.

== Drama ==
- American Gangster, a 2007 film directed by Ridley Scott
- American Son, a 2008 film directed by Neil Abramson
- Antwone Fisher, a 2002 film directed by and starring Denzel Washington
- Avalon, a 1990 film directed by Barry Levinson
- The Blind Side, a 2009 film directed by John Lee Hancock
- Brokeback Mountain, a 2005 film directed by Ang Lee
- Cast Away, a 2000 film directed by Robert Zemeckis
- A Child Is Waiting, a 1963 film directed by Abby Mann
- The Daytrippers, a 1996 film directed by Greg Mottola
- Deadfall, a 2012 film directed by Stefan Ruzowitzky
- The Doors, a 1991 biopic about Jim Morrison starring Val Kilmer
- Four Brothers, a 2005 film directed by John Singleton
- Giant, a 1956 film directed by George Stevens
- Home of the Brave, a 2006 film directed by Irwin Winkler
- The Humans, a 2021 film written and directed by Stephen Karam
- The Ice Storm, a 1997 film directed by Ang Lee
- Krisha, a 2015 film written and directed by Trey Edward Shults
- Maestro, a 2023 film directed by and starring Bradley Cooper
- The Morning After, a 1986 film directed by Sidney Lumet
- The Myth of Fingerprints, a 1997 film directed by Bart Freundlich
- One Special Night, a 1999 television film directed by Roger Young
- One True Thing, a 1998 film directed by Carl Franklin
- Palo Alto, a 2007 film written and directed by Brad Leong
- Plymouth Adventure, a 1952 film directed by Clarence Brown
- Prisoners, a 2013 film directed by Denis Villeneuve
- Repeat Performance, a 1947 film directed by Alfred L. Werker
- Rescue Dawn, a 2006 film directed by Werner Herzog
- Rocky, a 1976 film directed by John G. Avildsen, written by and starring Sylvester Stallone
- Rocky II, a 1979 film written and directed by and starring Sylvester Stallone
- Scent of a Woman, a 1992 film directed by Martin Brest
- Stepmom, a 1998 film directed by Chris Columbus
- Still Alice, a 2014 film directed by Richard Glatzer and Wash Westmoreland
- Stuck in Love, a 2012 film written and directed by Josh Boone
- Sweet November, a 2001 film directed by Pat O'Connor
- Thanksgiving, a 2004 short film directed by Tom Donahue
- A Time to Remember, a 2003 television film directed by William Sims Myers
- Unfaithful, a 2002 film directed by Adrian Lyne
- Unhook the Stars, a 1996 film directed by Nick Cassavetes
- The Vicious Kind, a 2009 film directed by Lee Toland Krieger
- The War at Home, a 1996 film directed by and starring Emilio Estevez

== Family ==
- A Family Thanksgiving, a 2010 Hallmark Channel Original Movie directed by Neill Fearnley
- Holiday Engagement, a 2011 Hallmark Channel Original Movie starring Bonnie Somerville and Shelley Long
- The Hoboken Chicken Emergency, a 1984 Television Movie based on the 1977 book
- Miracle on 34th Street, a 1947 comedy-fantasy spanning from Thanksgiving to Christmas; remade for television in 1973 and theatrically in 1994
- Molly's Pilgrim, a 1985 Oscar-winning short film
- The National Tree, a 2009 Hallmark Channel Original Movie starring Andrew McCarthy
- An Old Fashioned Thanksgiving, a 2008 Hallmark Channel Original Movie based on a short story by Louisa May Alcott
- The Santa Clause, a 1994 fantasy-comedy from Disney film spanning a year, with a scene in the latter half of the film set during Thanksgiving which helps kick off the film's final act
- Squanto: A Warrior's Tale, a 1994 Disney film based on the life of Squanto, featuring the first Thanksgiving in the final scene
- The Thanksgiving Promise, a 1986 TV film starring Beau Bridges
- The Thanksgiving Visitor, a 1967 TV adaptation of the story by Truman Capote
- Turkey Hollow, a 2015 film from Jim Henson Productions

== Horror ==
- Alien Abduction: Incident in Lake County (1998), a family is terrorized by extraterrestrial creatures while celebrating Thanksgiving
- Blood Rage (1987), a psychopath goes on a homicidal rampage after the twin brother he framed for murder years earlier escapes on Thanksgiving
- Boogeyman (2005), around Thanksgiving, a man is stalked by the entity that haunted his childhood
- Christmas Evil (1980), a mentally unbalanced man believes himself to be Santa Claus, giving presents to children and punishing the "naughty" through violence; part of the film takes place at Thanksgiving
- Escape Room (2019), a withdrawn student is challenged by a professor to do something that scares her over Thanksgiving break
- Home Movie (2008), home video footage documents a family's descent into violence and madness; includes scenes of various holidays including Thanksgiving
- Home Sweet Home (1981), an escaped mental patient embarks on a killing spree over Thanksgiving weekend
- Intensity (1997), a young woman encounters a serial killer while visiting a friend's family for Thanksgiving, then follows him to try and rescue a teenager he's abducted
- Kristy (2014), a college girl who is alone on campus over the Thanksgiving break is targeted by a group of outcasts
- The Last Thanksgiving (2020), a family of cannibals kill people who don't celebrate Thanksgiving
- Séance (2006), a group of college students left alone in their dorm over Thanksgiving weekend decide to hold a séance
- Thanksgiving (2006; short film), two couples are taken captive and tortured by a sadist during Thanksgiving dinner
- Thanksgiving (2007; short film), an insane, turkey-obsessed pilgrim commits a series of random murders on Thanksgiving; directed by Eli Roth
- Thanksgiving (2023), a full-length feature film version of the above short film, also directed by Roth
- ThanksKilling (2009), a group of students are hunted by a demonic turkey during Thanksgiving break
- ThanksKilling 3, a 2012 film sequel to ThanksKilling

== Musical ==
- By the Light of the Silvery Moon, a 1953 film directed by David Butler
- Holiday Inn, a 1942 film directed by Mark Sandrich
- The Wiz, a 1978 film directed by Sidney Lumet and starring Diana Ross

== Thriller ==
- The Morning After, a 1986 film directed by Sidney Lumet
- Fatal Attraction, a 1987 film directed by Adrian Lyne
- Don't Say a Word, a 2001 film directed by Gary Fleder
- Prisoners, a 2013 film directed by Denis Villeneuve
- Traitor, a 2008 film directed by Jeffrey Nachmanoff
- Unknown, a 2011 film directed by Jaume Collet-Serra

== See also ==
- List of Thanksgiving television specials
