= WMAL =

WMAL may refer to:

== Broadcasting ==
- WMAL-FM, a radio station (105.9 FM) licensed to Woodbridge, Virginia, United States
- WSBN, a radio station (630 AM) licensed to Washington, District of Columbia, United States, which held the call sign WMAL from 1925 to 2019
- WLVW, a radio station (107.3 FM) licensed to Washington, D.C., United States, which held the call sign WMAL-FM from 1949 to 1977
- WJLA-TV, a television station (channel 7) licensed to Washington, D.C., United States, which held the call sign WMAL-TV from 1947 to 1977

== Technology ==
- Windows Media Audio Lossless an encoding standard for lossless audio compression.
