= Harold Bell =

American marketer and executive

- Born: October 5, 1919; Union City, New Jersey
- Died: December 4, 2009 (aged 90); Los Angeles, California
- Occupation: Cartoonist
- Employer: Walt Disney Productions (1943-1957)
- Known for: Creating Woodsy Owl for the US Forest Service
- Notable work: Woodsy Owl
- Spouse: Edith Blonder
- Parents: David Belsky (father); Hilda Rosenthal Belsky (mother)

Harold Bell (October 5, 1919 – December 4, 2009) was an American marketer and merchandising executive who co-created Woodsy Owl, the mascot of the United States Forest Service. Bell created Woodsy Owl with two U.S. park rangers, Chuck Williams and Glenn Kovar, and another colleague, Betty Hite, for the first Earth Day in 1970. Woodsy Owl is best known for the motto, "Give a hoot, don’t pollute!".

== Biography ==
=== Early life ===
Harold Bell was born on October 5, 1919, in Union City, New Jersey. He was one of three sons born to his parents, David and Hilda Rosenthal Belsky. His father worked as an embroiderer.

Bell served in the United States Navy during World War II. He moved to Los Angeles, California, following the end of the war.

=== Career ===
Once in Los Angeles, Bell began working as a marketer and licensing agent for the Walt Disney Company. He founded his own marketing firm in 1957, which specialized in marketing cartoon, television and film characters to the public. Through his company, Bell helped to brand and license such iconic characters as Lassie, the Lone Ranger, Dick Tracy and Mr. Magoo.

Bell, a licensing agent, also produced and created a series of public service announcements for the National Forest Service featuring Smokey Bear.

Bell was hired as a technical advisor for the long-running, popular television show, Lassie. The concept for Woodsy Owl was developed on the set of Lassie. Bell teamed with three other Lassie technical advisors - United States Forest Service rangers, Chuck Williams and Glenn Kovar, and colleague Betty Hite - to create Woodsy Owl as the new mascot for the United States Forest Service for the first Earth Day in 1970.

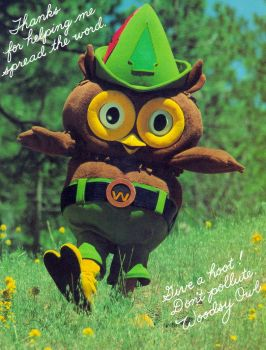
Woodsy Owl, anti-pollution mascot, for the US Forest Service

The United States Forest Service had requested that Bell and the others develop a new message and symbol for the agency. A number of other animals were considered as the mascot, including a ladybug, rainbow trout, elk and raccoon. An owl was ultimately chosen because of the belief that owls are wise, can see polluters from treetop perches, and can live near cities and towns. Bell and the others envisioned Woodsy Owl with a broad mission, unlike Smokey Bear, who focused almost exclusively on forest fire prevention. The owl would be used to advocate environmental programs and urge American children to fight pollution and help the environment. Woodsy Owl became most famous for his motto, Give a hoot, Don’t pollute. As of 2009, the character now uses the slogan, Help Woodsy Spread the Word, mixed with the song, The Syncopated Clock, by Leroy Anderson.
