= Harry Rossoll =

American artist and illustrator

Harry Rossoll (fl. 1937 – 1999) was an American artist and illustrator best known as one of the creators of Smokey Bear. Rossoll also created much of the art on display at the Forest Heritage Center at Beavers Bend State Park in Broken Bow, Oklahoma.

== Early life and education ==
Rossoll was born in Norwich, Connecticut as the son of German immigrant factory workers. He did not finish high school but studied commercial art and later studied at Grand Central School of Art in 1929.

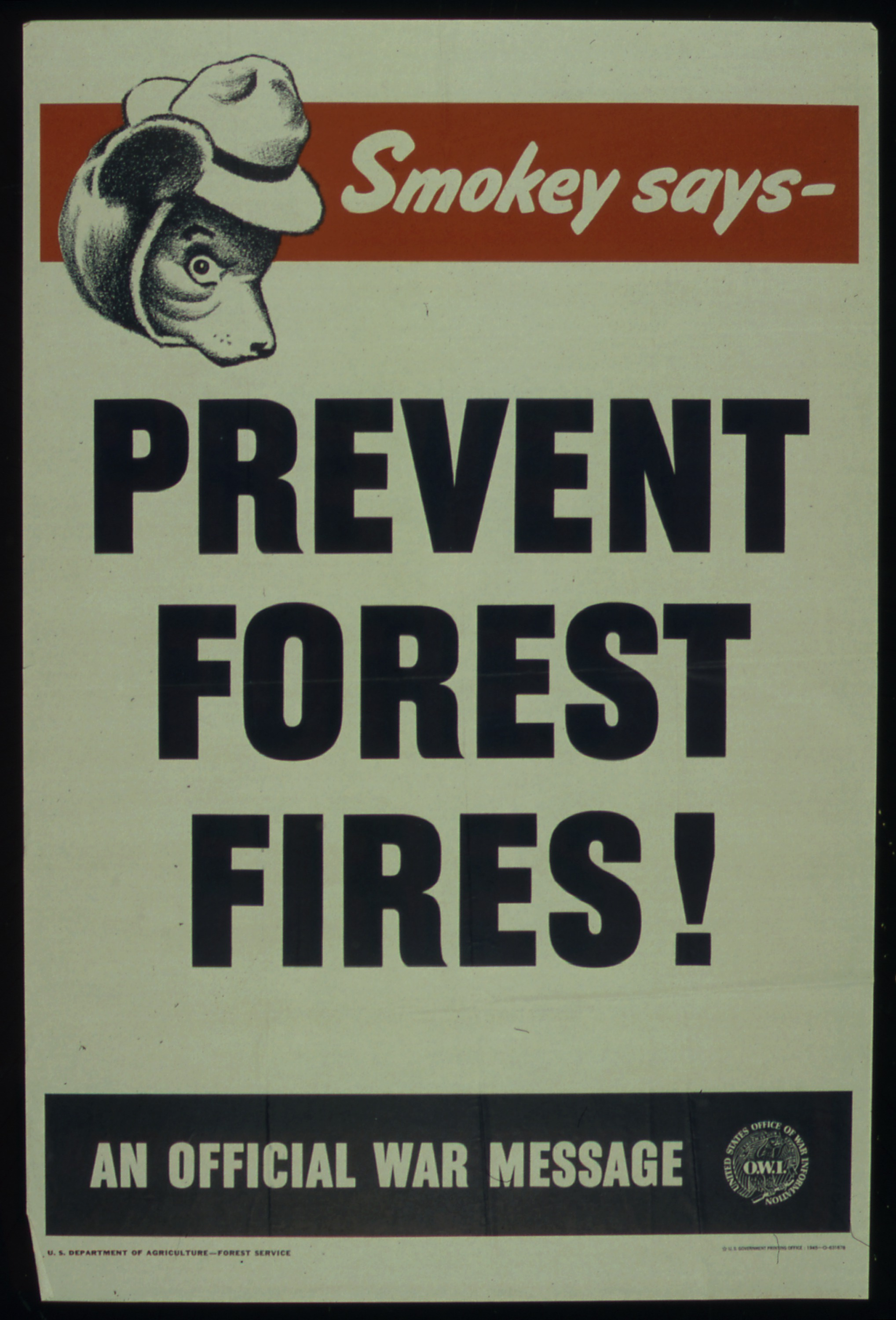
A "Smokey Says" poster similar to the ones Rossoll created

== Career ==
Rossoll worked for the United States Forestry Service from 1937 until he retired in 1971. He was tasked with creating a mascot to promote fire safety in American forests and created a rough sketch of Smokey Bear after a few unsuccessful attempts at other animals and park ranger caricatures. His colleague Rudy Wendelin improved the sketch and popularized Smokey in 1944. Rossoll continued to work on the awareness campaign, creating over 1,000 "Smokey Says" cartoons. Agriculture Secretary Dan Glickman called Rossoll "the father of Smokey Bear, a beloved national treasure".

He later developed a similar character, called Tree Bear, to raise awareness about how useful trees are as resources to the world.

In his retirement, Rossoll created what he considered his best work, a set of 14 dioramas and murals for the Forest Heritage Center in McCurtain County, Oklahoma, which depict forests throughout history.
