= Frank Harden =

American radio announcer

- Born: October 28, 1922; Macon, Georgia, U.S.
- Died: June 15, 2018 (aged 95); Chevy Chase, Maryland, U.S.
- Presenting career
- Show: The Harden and Weaver Show
- Station: WMAL

Francis Guinn Harden (October 28, 1922 – June 15, 2018) was an American radio announcer whose career spanned more than 50 years. Harden was best known as the genial co-host of The Harden and Weaver Show, which aired on WMAL, in Washington, D.C., from 1960 to 1998.

== Distinctions ==
Harden served as union president at the Washington chapter of AFTRA, and later, as a member of the AFTRA National board.

His book, On the Radio With Harden and Weaver, co-authored with Jackson Weaver and Ed Meyer, was published by Morrow in 1983.

== Early life ==
Harden was born in Macon and raised in Savannah, Georgia, the son of Maude Scott and John Harden, a railroad worker. Unable to play school sports due to poor eyesight, he learned trombone. As a college student playing with local dance bands for extra money, he had his first exposure to the world of entertainment and radio. In 1944, he was drafted into the US Army and served for 9 months before receiving a medical discharge due to a detached retina.

Still wearing an Army uniform, the 22-year-old Harden walked into the offices of Savannah NBC radio affiliate WSAV seeking employment. An on-the-spot interview and audition led to his first job as an announcer. Over the next three years, he worked at WSAV in Savannah, WRLD and WGST in Atlanta, and KLZ in Denver. Learning of an opening at ABC affiliate WMAL in Washington, DC, Harden auditioned and was hired, starting Christmas Eve, 1947.

At WMAL, Harden reported news and sports, covered presidential speeches, congressional and other public events. He was the announcer for Edward P. Morgan and The News Show for 8 years.

== Mid-career ==
In the 1950s, when radio seemed headed for extinction and replacement by TV, Harden teamed up with fellow WMAL announcer Jackson Weaver to create a 15-minute evening slot, titled "The Frank and Jackson Show", loosely modeled after Boston's popular Bob and Ray Show. In the late 1950s, they had their own WMAL-TV show, performing comic sketches written by Harden.

In 1960, WMAL manager Andy Ockershausen offered Harden and his partner an opportunity to create a show for the coveted 6 to 10 am morning drive time. The resulting Harden and Weaver Show began without fanfare, but gradually gained status as Washington's highest rated morning show. According to Marc Fisher, senior editor of the Washington Post, "By the mid-'60s, Harden and Weaver owned the mornings."

== The Harden and Weaver Show ==
The Harden and Weaver Show aired 6 days a week, from 6 am to 10 am, and dominated the Washington, D.C., morning ratings for over 32 years. By all reports, the co-hosts enjoyed a rare rapport with each other, and with their listeners. They mixed goofball comedy with music, guest interviews, news, and useful information. They delivered commercial scripts with off the cuff banter and ad-libs, an innovation in radio advertising.

Each program included a musical march and hymn, broadcast at the same precise time so that listeners could depend upon them during the morning routine. The co-hosts read letters from listeners, took on-air phone calls, and hosted occasional unscheduled guests.

Although Harden and Weaver discussed news events, they remained non-controversial, and neither revealed his personal political leanings in public. Harden wrote, in 1983, "(We) can be serious when the situation calls for it, and I can be a bit caustic at times. But it's usually on behalf of Everyman railing against the system. We don't pose as heavyweights... We'll acknowledge an issue - satirically - but won't climb on a soapbox... We're not in the business of alienating people."

In classic comedy mode, Harden was the easy-going straight man whose comments prompted Weaver's comic antics, based on a recurring repertoire of characters, each with a distinct accent and vocal tone. "Their characters became part of the daily conversation in offices, schools and shops," reported Fisher in the Washington Post. "Harden and Weaver's Rocky Rockmont, a fictional car salesman from a Chevy dealer, won so much currency that the actual salesmen at the dealership donned buttons saying, "Hi, I'm Rocky." When the WMAL duo made fun of the kitchen help at Sam Wong's Moon Palace restaurant on Wisconsin Avenue NW, business there soared, and the owner became a regional celebrity. After Harden and Weaver started putting the Eastern High School choir on the air to sing each Christmas season, it gained a following and reputation that persist three decades later."

Congressman Frank R. Wolf recorded in the US Congressional Record that when a Virginia park was threatened by budget cuts, "Harden and Weaver helped spur the community on with their daily reports on the importance of the park to school children. And that park was saved. When Harden and Weaver spoke, folks listened."

"Theirs was a quiet humor, restricted by a reticence that the culture soon would discard as old-fashioned. But before they vanished, (the show) did what many media efforts dream of, but never quite accomplish: They created community," wrote Fisher in the Washington Post.

Harden and his co-host made literally thousands of appearances at various community social and civic events, including serving as MCs at The Navy League and Whitehouse Correspondents dinner. In January 1975 the editors of Washingtonian named Harden and Weaver, "Washingtonians of the Year." "It's not easy to make hundreds of thousands of Washingtonians wake up a little less grumpy every morning, but that's what Frank Harden and Jackson Weaver do," wrote the editors. "...Anyone who has ever heard them knows that Harden and Weaver like people. They have reached out and encouraged us to smile more often, and to help those most in need of aid. Their concern has made Washington a better place to live.

Harden and Weaver used their celebrity to raise funds for community organizations, most notably the Children's National Medical Center, widely called Children's Hospital. Their listeners have donated multiple millions of dollars to the hospital's research and treatment center, by means of an ongoing golf outing. In appreciation, the hospital named a wing in their honor.

Guests, regular callers, and self-identified listeners to the Harden and Weaver Show included President Gerald Ford, dozens of Congressmen, Supreme Court Justice William O. Douglas, Air Force General Curtis LeMay, radio legend Paul Harvey, talk show host David Frost, singer Jimmy Dean, boxer Mohammed Ali, Washington Redskins' quarterback Sonny Jurgensen and coach George Allen.

Media personality Willard Scott wrote of Harden and Weaver, "They are successful because they are themselves. They love what they do and have a good time doing it, and the audience shares in this fun. They are dedicated to public service and have been active in the community. The show is not the result of a consulting firm or out of central casting... They are real and honest with themselves and their audience. The audience senses that and responds."

== Later career ==
After Weaver's death in 1992, Harden continued the show, with co-hosts Tim Brant and Andy Parks. The Harden, Brant, and Parks Show ranked at or near the top of the ratings for five more years.

Harden received the March of Dimes A.I.R. (Achievement in Radio) Lifetime Award and other honors. The Children's National Medical Center Golf Classic that he co-founded in 1971 remains an important fund-raiser: The 40th outing occurred in 2011.

== Personal ==
Harden married twice and was the father of five grown children. He lived in Washington, D.C., and Sweden with his wife, Berit. Harden died on June 15, 2018, in Chevy Chase, Maryland.

== Bibliography ==
- Frank Harden and Jackson Weaver, with Ed Meyer. On The Radio with Harden and Weaver: Life On and Off the Air with Two of the Country's Most Popular Radio Personalities, Morrow Publishing, 1983. ISBN 978-0-688-02032-3
