= Larry O'Connor (radio host) =

American political media personality (born 1967)

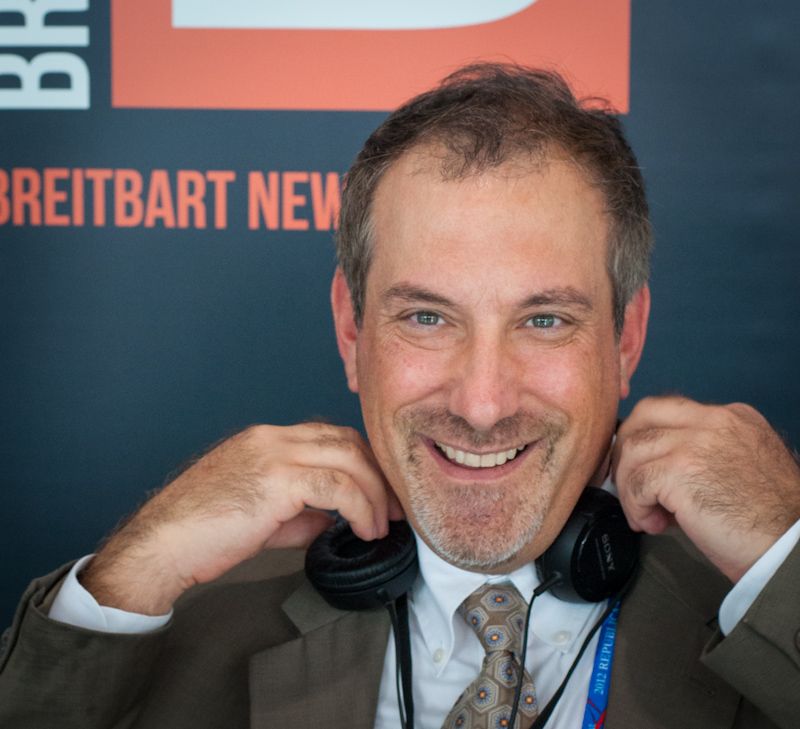
- O'Connor at the Republican National Convention, August 2012
- Born: June 23, 1967 (age 59); Detroit, Michigan, U.S.
- Education: Corona del Mar High School
- Occupations: Editor, TV/Podcast/Radio host, columnist
- Employer(s): Townhall, Salem Media Group, WMAL-FM
- Spouse: Meredith O'Connor (m. 2015)

Lawrence O'Connor (born June 23, 1967) is an American media host on the Cumulus-owned heritage radio station WMAL-FM in Washington, D.C., and frequent television guest on the Fox News early morning show Fox & Friends as well as Fox News Channel's Red Eye w/ Greg Gutfeld. He is the author of Shameless Liars: How Trump Defeated the Legacy Media and Made Them Irrelevant. In 2015 he married Meredith Dake.

Salem Media Group’s Townhall Media announced in January 2026 that they have named O’Connor as editor of Townhall.com.

== Early life ==
Born in Detroit, Michigan, O'Connor grew up in the suburban township of Plymouth located between Detroit and Ann Arbor. In 1980 he moved to Newport Beach, California, and attended Corona del Mar High School.

== Career ==
=== Theatre ===
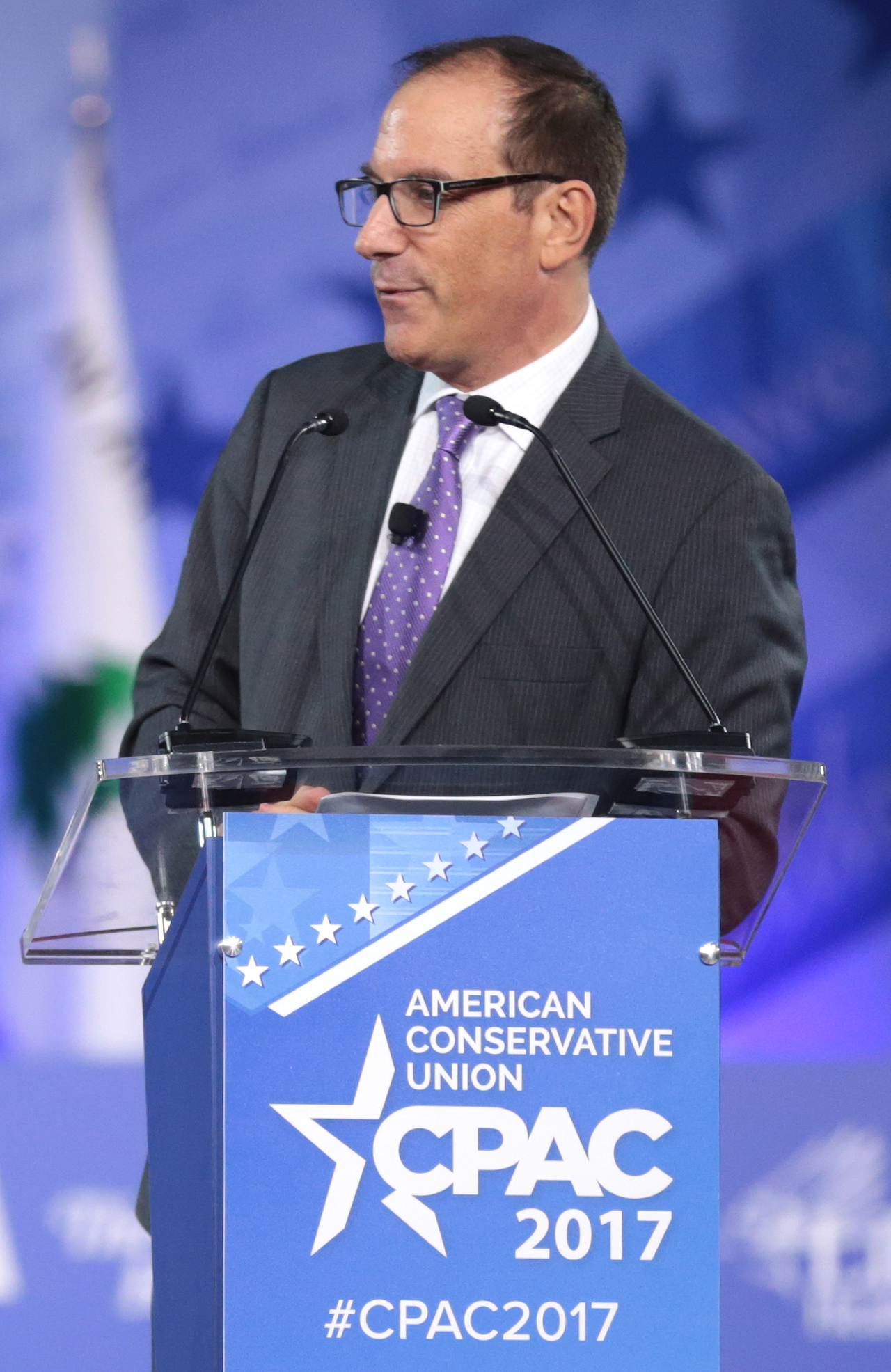
O'Connor in 2017

From 1986 to 1999, O'Connor worked for The Shubert Organization. During his tenure as general manager of the Shubert Theatre, Los Angeles (1991–1999), O'Connor oversaw the renovation of the 2,100-seat theatre specifically to accommodate the American premiere of Andrew Lloyd Webber's SUNSET BLVD. starring Glenn Close. He helped create the Ovation Awards, the competitive theatre awards in Los Angeles modeled after Broadway's Tony Awards. He served as executive producer of the awards show in 1994 and 1995, and he served as president of the governing body for the awards, Theatre LA, the league of Los Angeles Theatres.

After leaving Shubert in 1999, O'Connor served as general manager/producer for several major productions including Sweeney Todd, starring Kelsey Grammer; A Knight Out, starring Sir Ian McKellen; and 10 Commandments the Musical, Starring Val Kilmer and then-unknown Adam Lambert.

=== Writing ===
In January 2009 O'Connor began writing for Andrew Breitbart's Big Hollywood site under the pseudonym Stage Right. O'Connor focused on the theatre industry and wrote from the perspective of a conservative in the closet surrounded by political liberals on Broadway. He wrote many posts about the NEA Conference call scandal. His byline frequently appeared at Big Journalism, Breitbart's site focusing on the mainstream media.

In June 2011 O'Connor was promoted to the editor-in-chief of another Andrew Breitbart brainchild, Breitbart.tv, a political video Web site catering to the right-of-center internet audience. Since his installment at Breitbart.tv, the site broke several videos, including the video that eventually led to Rep. Bob Ethridge's ouster from Congress. In July 2011, Shirley Sherrod filed suit against O'Connor, Andrew Breitbart, and an unnamed third person for defamation. In October 2015, the parties settled out of court for an undisclosed amount.

In December 2013, O'Connor left Breitbart after the death of his friend, the site's founder, Andrew Breitbart. In June 2014 he joined Independent Journal Review as Editor-at-Large. He served in that capacity through April 2016. He then joined Hot Air as Editor-at-Large through December 2016.

=== Book ===
- O'Connor, Larry (January 28, 2025). Shameless Liars: How Trump Defeated the Legacy Media and Made Them Irrelevant. Chevy Chase, Maryland: independent. ISBN 979-8304045254.

=== Radio ===
While O'Connor started his radio career on Internet radio in January 2010 on BlogTalkRadio. The show consisted of O'Connor's monologues on current events in news, politics, and the entertainment industry; interviews with newsmakers and journalists; calls from listeners; and interaction with the live chat room. Guests on the nightly show, as well as special live remote shows have included Gov. Mitt Romney, Newt Gingrich, Rick Santorum, Herman Cain, Richard Dreyfuss, Greg Gutfeld, Fred Thompson, Ed Morrissey, Adam Baldwin, and Michelle Malkin. In 2011 the show added webcams and a Ustream feed to the nightly show and late in that year the show's name was changed to "The Larry O'Connor Show."

Also in 2011, O'Connor began filling in for many terrestrial radio shows and stations including nationally syndicated shows like The Dennis Miller Show, The Hugh Hewitt Show and The Rusty Humphries Show. As well as local shows on major market stations like WOR and WABC in New York, WMAL in Washington, D.C., WLS in Chicago, WPHT in Philadelphia and WIBC in Indianapolis.

In November 2012, O'Connor was hired as a permanent co-host of WMAL's "Mornings on the Mall" alongside Brian Wilson. In November 2016 WMAL announced it would replace The Savage Nation by giving Larry O'Connor his own show in the 3 p.m. – 6 p.m. timeslot. In November 2017 President Trump said on The Larry O'Connor Show he was very unhappy the Justice Department was not going after Hillary Clinton.

Starting May 4, 2026, O’Connor hosts the live Monday-Friday 6-9 AM Eastern (3-6 AM Pacific) time slot across Salem Radio Network's 140 stations nationwide. Following his three hours of radio daily during the week, he continues to livestream his Townhall show, LARRY.

=== Other media ===
In May 2026, O'Connor was named as a co-host of The Morning Meeting, a daily podcast airing on the interactive media platform 2WAY. He is co-host alongside Mark Halperin and Kevin Walling.

== Personal life ==
He married journalist Meredith Dake in August 2015. They have four children together.

As of 2021, O'Connor was a practicing Catholic who does not receive Communion due to being divorced and remarried outside of the Church.
