= Chris Core =

- Occupations: Radio personality; journalist

Chris Core (born December 8, 1948) is an American radio and television personality. Formerly on Washington, D.C.'s 630 WMAL and host of The Chris Core Show that aired from 9 a.m. to 11:45 a.m. Eastern Time. Marc Fisher of The Washington Post described Core as "a rare talker who gets the complexities of this region." The program was one of the highest rated shows in the competitive midday slot prior to being briefly moved, mostly unchanged, to a morning slot. The show covered a wide variety of topics ranging from politics, the Global War on Terrorism, local and current affairs, show business, and others, until its cancellation on February 29, 2008. It was a "call in" type program where listeners were encouraged to offered their opinions. Core has maintained that he is neither a Democrat nor a Republican. The show often featured prominent local and national politicians who frequently called the show unsolicited. Core treated callers with respect regardless of their political stance. His show allowed people on both sides of an issue to express their opinions and allowed listeners to form their own opinions. Core also from time to time kept a caller on the line to discuss the topic at hand with other callers.

== Early life and education ==
Core grew up in the small town of Clinton, Iowa. In 1971 Core graduated from the University of Wisconsin–Madison with a degree in political science and theater and minor in Spanish. Three years later, he began his career at WMAL doing news and sports on the weekends. In 1976, Core replaced Ed Meyer as veteran news talker Bill Trumbull's cohost on the afternoon program "Two for the Road". Within a few years the name of the show was changed to The Trumbull and Core Show. Eventually this became The Chris Core Show. Brooke Stevens filled in as co-host following Bill Trumbull's retirement in 1996, prior to leaving the station in 2000. He was a resident of Chevy Chase, Maryland.

== Career ==
On February 29, 2008, Core was dismissed from WMAL after working for the station for over 33 years, as part of a broad shakeup at the station's parent company, Citadel Broadcasting. Core was dismissed following that day's show, leaving him without the opportunity to say goodbye to his audience. Core expressed hope to one day return to the air on a different station. WMAL host Chris Plante replaced Core in WMAL's morning lineup.

In 2008, Core was hired as a feature commentator on Washington DC's news radio station WTOP. His commentary, "Core Values," was heard at 3:40, 6:10, and 8:40 pm. He starred in a commentary-style TV show, Chris Core Talks, on D.C.'s local CW station. He also served as a guest host on XM Radio (Channel 130) "POTUS".

== Awards and recognition ==
Core received the RTNDA Edward R. Murrow Award in 2009, and was named one of three top radio personalities by readers of The Washington Times in their 2002 Readers' Choice awards; he was recently named one of the Top 100 Talk Show Hosts in the country by Talkers Magazine for the second year in a row.
