= Junior Forest Rangers =

USDA Forest Service youth program

The USDA Forest Service has created two national junior ranger programs: Junior Forest Ranger Adventure Guide and Junior Snow Ranger. The Junior Forest Rangers is a program allows children to, after completing a booklet of activities related to outdoor skills, conservation, and forest fire prevention, receive a Junior Forest Rangers or Snow Ranger patch and certificate. The Junior Forest Ranger program is also available in Spanish. The forest service also maintains a webpage with kid friendly activities.

The Junior Forest Rangers program began in 1953, when a Smokey Bear plush toy produced by Ideal Toys and sold by Macy's department store came with a card that allowed children to contact Smokey and become a Junior Forest Ranger. In 1955 there were 500,000 Junior Forest Rangers, and Smokey Bear was receiving so much mail that in 1965 he was given his own zip code. The Forest Service re-launched the Junior Forest Rangers program in 2006 with a redesigned booklet, now called an "Adventure Guide."
