= Johnny Horizon =

Anti-litter campaign mascot

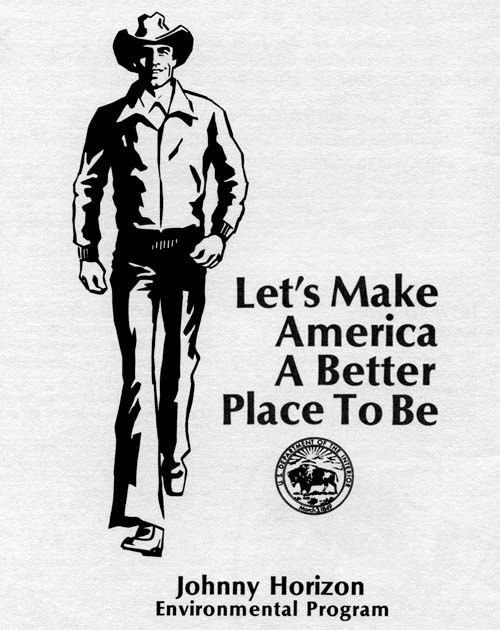

Johnny Horizon Environmental Test Kit, 1971, at the Science History Institute

Johnny Horizon was a mascot used by the Bureau of Land Management in the United States in the 1970s primarily for its anti-litter campaign.

First used in 1968, and resembling a cigaretteless Marlboro Man, Johnny Horizon reached his greatest use in the years leading up to the United States Bicentennial celebration, with the Johnny Horizon '76 Program. September 15, 1974 to October 15, 1974 was proclaimed Johnny Horizon '76 Clean Up America Month, 1974 by President Gerald R. Ford.

Like the better known Smokey Bear and Woodsy Owl characters of the United States Forest Service, use of the Johnny Horizon mascot was protected under Federal law (18 U.S.C. 714) beginning in 1970 until his protection was repealed in 1982. The character is no longer used by the Bureau.

In 1971, a Johnny Horizon Environmental Test Kit was licensed by the U. S. Department of the Interior and produced by Parker Brothers. It included four air pollution tests and six water pollution tests for young environmental scientists. The Johnny Horizon Environmental Test Kit was marketed to both boys and girls.
