= The Smokey Bear Show =

1969-1970 Rankin/Bass American animated television show

- Written by: Romeo Muller; William J. Keenan; Shamus Culhane; Frank Freda; Hal Hackady; Fred Halliday
- Directed by: Arthur Rankin Jr. Jules Bass
- Voices of: Jackson Weaver; Carl Banas; Billie Mae Richards; Paul Soles
- Composers: Maury Laws; Jules Bass
- Countries of origin: United States; Japan
- Original language: English
- No. of seasons: 1
- No. of episodes: 17 (51 segments)

Production
- Producers: Arthur Rankin Jr. Jules Bass
- Editor: Irwin Goldress
- Running time: 30 minutes
- Production companies: Animation: Toei Doga; Rankin/Bass Productions

Original release
- Network: ABC
- Release: September 6, 1969 – September 5, 1970

The Smokey Bear Show is an American-Japanese animated television series that aired on ABC's Saturday morning schedule, produced by Rankin/Bass Productions. The show features Smokey Bear, the icon of the United States Forest Service, who was well known for his 1947 slogan, "Remember... only YOU can prevent forest fires". It aired for one season of 17 episodes starting on September 6, 1969, then aired in reruns on Sunday mornings for the 1970–71 season, due to the show's inability to compete with CBS' The Bugs Bunny/Road Runner Hour and NBC's The Heckle and Jeckle Show. Copies of all 17 episodes were deposited at the Library of Congress, but only 4 episodes from other sources have been made publicly available as of 2023.

The Smokey Bear Show was based on stories created for the Dell Comics Smokey the Bear comic books, which were published as part of Dell's Four Color anthology series from 1955 to 1961. The comic featured anthropomorphic animals acting out fables of carelessness and greed, including a story about two bears who are Communist spies, and another about two cynical weasels who want to feed a baby bird to a bobcat in order to sell pictures of the "tragedy" to a magazine. The series adapted the comic's tales for the show, but toned down some of the morbid content. It did not garner high ratings.

American broadcaster and voice-over artist Jackson Weaver performed the voice for the adult Smokey; the cub Smokey was voiced by Canadian actress Billie Mae Richards. Other voices were provided by Carl Banas and Paul Soles. The series' animation was outsourced to Japanese studio Toei Doga (now known as Toei Animation), who were also responsible for their overseas animation work on The King Kong Show (its international co-production with Rankin/Bass) in 1966, The Wacky World of Mother Goose in 1967, and the Thanksgiving special The Mouse on the Mayflower in 1968.

Previously, Rankin/Bass produced a General Electric Fantasy Hour television special for NBC in 1966, The Ballad of Smokey the Bear, which featured their trademark stop-motion animation called "Animagic".

While the character is often referred to in popular culture as "Smokey the Bear" (including in the Dell Comics series), the correct name is "Smokey Bear", which is reflected in the cartoon's title and the spinoff Gold Key Comics series.

== Opening ==
The theme song, written by Jules Bass and Maury Laws, tells a brief summary of the bear's history: he was saved as a cub from a forest fire in New Mexico by a ranger, who named him Smokey and brought him to Washington, D.C. There, he became a ranger, and we see him wear a ranger hat and grab his trusty shovel as he grows to a full size, adult bear. Traveling through the city in a parade, he heads for the woods with an important job to do.

This reflects the true story of a real bear cub who was rescued from the May 1950 Capitan Gap Fire in New Mexico. That cub was named Smokey after the already existing ad campaign, which began in 1944. New Mexico Department of Game and Fish Ranger Ray Bell and his family adopted the cub, and nursed him back to health, with the help of a veterinarian. The story was picked up by the national news service, and upon regaining his health, the bear was taken to the National Zoo in Washington and designated the "living symbol" of Smokey Bear.

== Description ==
Smokey Bear, as the character appears in the television series.

Each episode contains three cartoons: two featuring Smokey as an adult bear, with the middle cartoon showing Smokey in his cub days titled "Smokey Bear's Album."

Smokey lives in the forest with his neighbors: Floyd the fox, Benny the hare, Bessie Boar, Hiram the snake, Mayor Owl, Freddy Fume, the skunk, Smokey's cousin Griz, and Gabby the cougar. He often has to remind his friends about the principles of fire safety, and the show also stresses other conservation themes. Smokey's original catchphrase was "care will prevent 9 out of 10 Forest fires".

== Smokey's impact ==
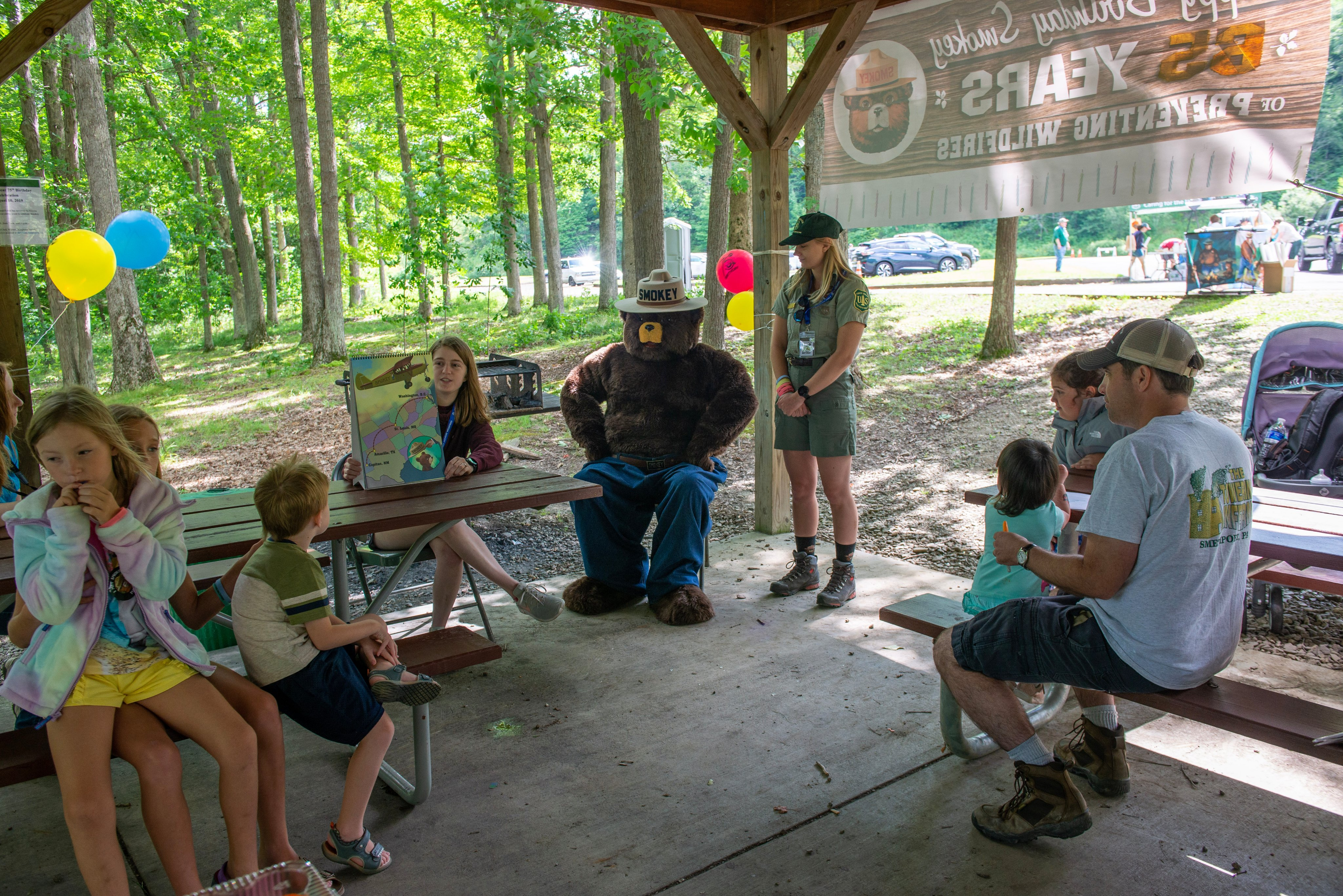
Smokey Bear interacting with youth on the 75th anniversary of Smokey Bear at Allegheny National Forest. Teaching Important Fire safety details!

A large part of Smokey Bear's image has come mainly from his campaigns with the U.S Forest Service originating in the 1940s. The Smokey Bear Show was a large part in connecting with influential youth. The show, though short in its lifetime, can be looked at as the start of a cultural bridge for Smokey Bear to become a symbol to kids and adults across the United States. An article states that "Smokey Bear has made appearances at events, schools, and community gatherings to spread awareness about the importance of preventing wildfires". In the 1960s traction for wildlife problems were becoming widespread and the smokey the bear show was pivotal for educating the youth on such problems. While the show contributed to long-term wildfire suppression efforts, this suppression eventually resulted in forest fires that are now more prone to being highly flammable. The absence of regular, low-intensity fires allowed for the accumulation of fuel, which, when ignited, can lead to more intense and destructive forest fires.

== Comic books ==
As a tie-in for the cartoon, Gold Key Comics published another Smokey Bear comic book series, this time a quarterly beginning with an issue dated February 1970. 13 issues were published, ending in March 1973. In these stories, Smokey was aided by a coyote deputy named Clem. His TV show friends Bessie Pig, Benny Bunny and Mayor Owl appeared in the comic, along with Mr. and Mrs. Grizzly, Luke and Seth Coyote, Floyd Fox, Mayor Owl's niece Olivia, Lionel Lion and Sammy Skunk.

== Cast ==
The voice cast included:

- Jackson Weaver as Smokey the Bear (adult)
- Billie Mae Richards as Smokey the Bear (cub), Bessie Boar, Additional voices
- Carl Banas as Mayor Owl, Gabby the Cougar, Floyd the Fox, Freddy Fume, Beaky Buzzard, Clyde, Robber #1, Additional voices
- Paul Soles as Benny the Hare, Cousin Grizzly, Hiram the Snake, Bernie, Robber #2, Butch Buzzard, Additional voices

== Crew ==
- Producers/Directors: Arthur Rankin Jr., Jules Bass
- Script Editor: William J. Keenan
- Writers: Shamus Culhane, Frank Freda, Hal Hackady, Fred Halliday, Romeo Muller, William J. Keenan
- Music and Lyrics: Maury Laws, Jules Bass
- Recording Supervisor: Bernard Cowan
- Character Designer: Rod Willis
- Animation Supervisor: Steve Nakagawa
- Editorial Supervision: Irwin Goldress
- Sound Engineers: Stephen Frohock, Gene Coleman, Robert Brown

== Episodes ==
No.	Title	Original release date
1	"Founder's Day Folly" "Old Club House" "One Born Every Second"	September 6, 1969
2	"The Outlaws" "Silliest Show on Earth" "Mission Improbable"	September 13, 1969
3	"Running Wild" "Spooksville" "Saga of Gas Bag"	September 20, 1969
4	"Kid Hare Vs. Killer Cougar" "High Divin'" "Spit 'N Polish"	September 27, 1969
5	"Mighty Minerva" "Casanova Hare" "Great Kite Contest"	October 4, 1969
6	"Bessie Paints the Town" "Thar She Blows" "Hobo Jackal"	October 11, 1969
7	"Sneaky Beaky" "Heroes Are Born" "Winter and Still Champ"	October 18, 1969
8	"Freddy's Big Date" "Gone Fishin'" "An Apple a Day Keeps"	October 25, 1969
9	"The Not So Merry Mailman" "An Ill Wind" "The Baby Sitters"	November 1, 1969
10	"The Fire Fighter's Convention" "The End of the World (Almost)" "Hizzoner the Admiral"	November 8, 1969
11	"Invention Is the Mother of Necessity" "Ancient Caleb Coyote" "Haunted Castle"	November 15, 1969
12	"The Honorable Freddy Fume" "Gold Medal Grizzly" "Treasure Hunt"	November 22, 1969
13	"Leave It to Grizzly" "Citizen Fume" "Invisible Benny"	November 29, 1969
14	"The Battle of Penny Echo River" "Grizzly Rides Again" "Build a Better Bridge"	December 6, 1969
15	"Feudin, Fightin' and Fussin'" "Stick 'Em Up" "Goal Line Grizzly"	December 13, 1969
16	"The Crabtrees Forever" "Hare of a Thousand Faces" "Whar Fer Art Thou"	December 20, 1969
17	"The Celebrity" "Ice Frolics" "The Hambone Heist"	December 27, 1969
