= Kevin Walling =

American political commentator

- Born: Kevin P. Walling; August 2, 1985 or 1986 (age 40–41); New Jersey, U.S.
- Education: Catholic University
- Occupations: Political commentator; campaign consultant
- Political party: Democratic
- Spouse: Alex Stroman (m. 2024)

Kevin P. Walling (born August 2, 1985, or 1986) is an American political commentator, Democratic Party strategist, campaign consultant, and former nonprofit executive. He is the lead political contributor and political analyst for WTTG and is a co-host of The Morning Meeting on the interactive media platform 2WAY. He previously worked as director of Equality Maryland from 2008 to 2010, and served as a campaign surrogate for Joe Biden's 2020 and 2024 campaigns.

== Early life and education ==
Walling was born on August 2, in New Jersey. He graduated with a bachelor's degree from the Catholic University of America.

== Career ==
Walling worked as director of Equality Maryland from 2008 to 2010. He went on to work as the national field director for No Labels. He later criticized the organization as a "shadow operation on behalf of Republicans."

=== 2014 Maryland House of Delegates election ===
In July 2013, Walling declared his candidacy for the 16th district of the Maryland House of Delegates, attempting to succeed Susan Lee. Endorsed by former Governor Parris Glendening, he faced several candidates for the Democratic nomination. In February 2014, Walling withdrew from the race citing a lack of campaign funds.

In July 2014, Walling was elected as chairman of the Montgomery County Democratic Central Committee; he was the youngest and first openly gay chairman in the county's history.

Walling worked for the Joe Biden and Kamala Harris campaign as a media surrogate during the 2020 and 2024 elections.

=== Media career ===
Walling is a left wing political commentator who has been featured on CNN, Fox News, MS NOW, and Bloomberg News. He is the lead political contributor and political analyst for WTTG in Washington, D.C. He's also an opinion contributor for The Hill.

In May 2026, Walling was named as a permanent co-host of The Morning Meeting, a daily podcast airing on the interactive media platform 2WAY. He is co-host alongside Mark Halperin and Larry O'Connor.

== Personal life ==
Walling is openly gay. In February 2024, he married former RNC spokesman Alex Stroman at Grace Church Cathedral in Charleston, South Carolina. The couple split their time between Charleston and Washington, D.C.

Walling was an attendee of the 2026 White House Correspondents' Dinner shooting, commentating from inside the hotel ballroom during the events.
