= WSBN =

ESPN Radio affiliate in Washington, D.C.

- Washington, D.C.; United States
- Broadcast area: Washington metropolitan area
- Frequency: 630 kHz
- Branding: ESPN 630 D.C.

Programming
- Language: English
- Format: Sports radio
- Network: ESPN Radio
- Affiliations: Baltimore Orioles; Baltimore Ravens; Virginia Cavaliers

Ownership
- Owner: Cumulus Media; (Radio License Holdings LLC)
- Sister stations: WMAL-FM

History
- First air date: October 12, 1925
- Former call signs: WMAL (1925–2019)

Technical information
- Licensing authority: FCC
- Facility ID: 73250
- Class: B
- Power: 15,000 watts day; 2,700 watts night
- Transmitter coordinates: 39°8′2.4″N 77°18′12.9″W
- Repeater: 105.9 WMAL-FM HD2 (Woodbridge, Virginia)

Links
- Public license information: Public file; LMS
- Webcast: Listen live
- Website: www.sportscapitoldc.com

WSBN (630 kHz) is a commercial AM sports radio station licensed to Washington, D.C., and serving the Washington metropolitan area. It operates with 15,000 watts in the daytime and 2,700 watts at night using a directional antenna around the clock. WSBN's studios are on Jenifer Street in Northwest Washington. The transmitter is located off Black Rock Road in Germantown, Maryland.

WSBN is owned and operated by Cumulus Media and is affiliated with ESPN Radio. It is one of the oldest radio stations in the Washington media market, continuously on the air from 1925. For most of its history, the station operated as WMAL; on July 1, 2019, its talk programming was moved exclusively to co-owned WMAL-FM at 105.9 MHz, which had simulcast with 630 AM since 2011.

== Programming ==
WSBN has two local hosts on weekdays, Andy Pollin in late mornings and Bram Weinstein in afternoon drive time. The rest of the schedule is largely made up of programs from ESPN Radio.

As of 2022, WSBN broadcasts the games of the Baltimore Ravens and Virginia Cavaliers football and men's basketball. It announced on March 24, 2021, that it joined the Baltimore Orioles Radio Network as an affiliate station beginning with the upcoming season.

== History ==
=== Early years ===
The station first went on the air, as WMAL, on October 12, 1925, using call letters incorporating the initials of Martin A. Leese, a local optician who began selling radio sets at 720 11th Street NW in Washington, D.C. He started WMAL as a low-power station. The shutdown of station WCAP left Washington with WRC (now WTEM) as its only high-power station, so local business leaders affiliated with the City Club of Washington banded together to create a second high-powered station. Their original plan was to buy WCAP and convert it to a municipal station, but instead they worked with Leese to boost WMAL's signal and make it the city's second large station. The new high-power WMAL went on the air from studios at 710-712 11th Street NW on October 2, 1926, with former WCAP announcer William T. Pierson as director and with a policy of encouraging young broadcasting talent in hopes of creating "a people's forum".

In 1927, Leese left his optical business to focus full-time on running the station, and the following year the Federal Radio Commission's national frequency allocation plan assigned WMAL the AM 630 frequency. WMAL was an affiliate of the CBS Radio Network from 1928 until October 19, 1932, and then was briefly unaffiliated until joining the NBC Blue Network in January 1933. The Blue Network later became ABC, with which WMAL was affiliated for many years, and which owned WMAL for several decades.

By mid-1932, M. R. Baker had been appointed manager of the station, and Kenneth H. Berkeley was appointed station director of WMAL in 1933. While still owned by the Leese family, WMAL was eventually leased to the National Broadcasting Company in 1934, joining it with owned-and-operated station WRC.

NBC's Washington vice president Frank M. Russell supervised the operation of both WMAL and WRC by 1935 when studios were moved from the National Press Building to the Trans-Lux Theatre Building, 724 14th Street NW. Transmitting facilities continued to be located at 712 Eleventh Street NW.

In the late months of 1937, the lease to NBC was terminated, with station operation reverting to the Leese family interests. NBC, however, continued to operate it under a managerial agreement executed in fall 1937. Norman Leese was president of WMAL's licensee at that time. On May 1, 1938, the M.A. Leese Radio Corporation was acquired by publishers of the now-defunct Washington Evening Star newspaper, a family-owned concern headed by board chairman and president Samuel H. Kauffman. Norman Leese remained president and K. H. Berkeley continued as general manager of WMAL.

The operating arrangement between NBC and the M.A. Leese Radio Corporation ended in February 1942. The station then reverted to the direct control of the Evening Star Broadcasting Company, of which K. H. Berkeley was executive vice president. Berkeley was also WMAL's general manager. In October 1947, WMAL-TV signed on as the first high-band VHF television station in the United States. It became an ABC Television Network affiliate a year later.

By 1946, S. H. Kauffman, president and part owner of the Evening Star, was given additional duties as president of its broadcasting subsidiary, the Evening Star Broadcasting Company, until his resignation in August 1954. His replacement as general manager was Frederick S. Houwink.

Also in 1954, John W. Thompson Jr. replaced S. H. Kauffman as president of Evening Star Broadcasting Co.

Andrew Martin Ockershausen was appointed station manager of WMAL in 1960. One of Ockershausen's first moves was to team Frank Harden with Jackson Weaver for WMAL's morning drive show after the duo had a successful tryout hosting an evening comedy show patterned after Bob and Ray; Harden and Weaver took off in popularity and quickly became the top-rated morning show in the Washington market, featuring a blend of news, interviews, light music and comedy.

In 1962, Fred Houwink became a company vice president while continuing as WMAL's general manager. In 1965 Houwink was named vice president of Evening Star Broadcasting and Ockershausen was elevated to general manager of WMAL.

In 1970 Houwink retired and Ockershausen was named vice president, operations. Also in 1970 Richard S. Stakes was named general manager and Harold L. Green was named station manager. In 1974 Charles A. Macatee became WMAL's general manager.

=== ABC years ===
In early January 1976, the Evening Star Broadcasting Company's WMAL, WMAL-FM and WMAL-TV and majority control of the ailing newspaper were acquired from the Kauffman, Noyes and Adams families by publisher Joseph L. Albritton’s Perpetual Corporation and Albritton became board chairman and chief owner of WMAL's license. On January 21, 1976, WMAL's licensee name was changed to Washington Star Communications of Delaware, Inc. Richard S. Stakes became station president, but resigned in December 1976. Mr. Albritton then assumed the presidency, with Robert Nelson becoming president of the broadcasting division. General Manager Charles Macatee resigned in January 1977.

A requirement of the purchase of the Evening Star properties included the sale of the radio or television properties. In March 1977, WMAL and WMAL-FM were spun off to ABC Radio, while the TV station was retained and became WJLA-TV, named after Albritton's initials. ABC paid $16 million for WMAL and WMAL-FM, a record price for radio properties at that time. Andrew Ockershausen was appointed executive vice president.

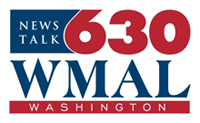
WMAL logo used until 2009.

On January 3, 1986, Capital Cities and ABC, Inc. merged in a $3.52 billion deal. Thomas S. Murphy was chairman and CEO of the new firm. Frederick Weinhaus became president and general manager following the resignation of Andrew Ockershausen in March 1986. Weinhaus was transferred to ABC Radio New York in January 1988. His replacement in May 1988 was Thomas Bresnahan, who continued in that role until his retirement in 2002.

WMAL morning co-host Jackson Weaver died on October 20, 1992, with Harden and Weaver still at or near the top of the local ratings; Weaver also garnered fame nationally as the first voice of Smokey Bear. Frank Harden continued the morning show with co-hosts Tim Brant and Andy Parks until his retirement in 1998. Brant and Parks continued until Brant's departure in May 2002, his replacement would be former congressman Fred Grandy.

In 1996, WMAL won a Alfred I. duPont–Columbia University Award for its reporting on Disney's America. By the late 1990s, WMAL transitioned its talk lineup into one similar to sister station WABC in New York City, with an emphasis on conservative talk.

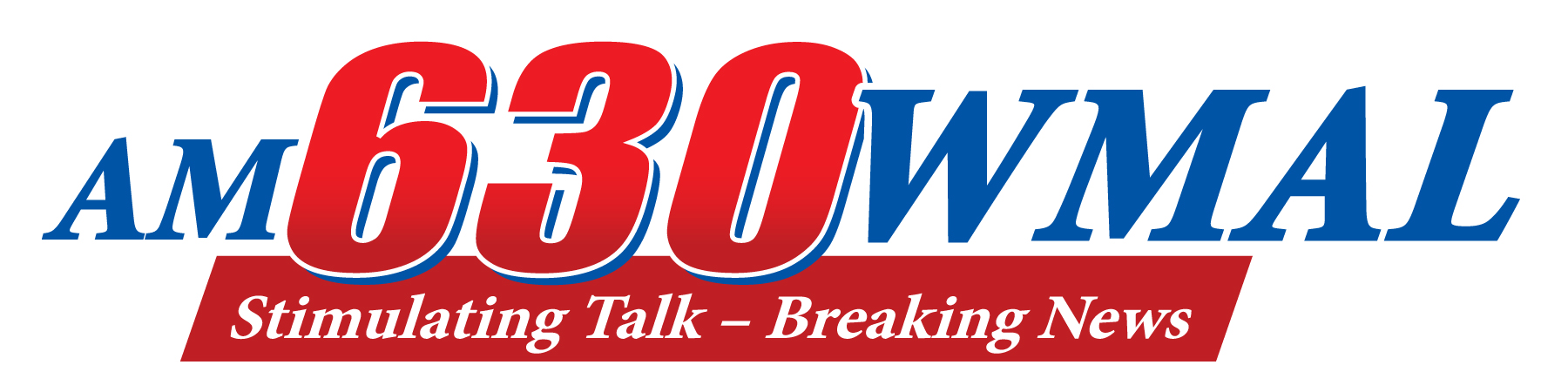
WMAL logo, 2009-2011

Chris Berry was named president and general manager November 19, 2002. Prior to joining WMAL, Berry was vice president, radio for ABC News, based in New York. In August 2005, host Michael Graham was fired after refusing to apologize for calling the Council on American-Islamic Relations (CAIR) a "terrorist organization."

=== Citadel and Cumulus years ===
ABC sold its non-Radio Disney and ESPN Radio stations, including WMAL, to Citadel Broadcasting in 2007; Citadel merged with Cumulus Media on September 16, 2011.

Longtime Washington broadcaster Chris Core was dismissed from WMAL in 2008 as part of a broad cost-cutting move; his replacement, Austin Hill was dropped in February 2009 due to Levin's show expanding and Sliwa's show moving up an hour. Plante, a popular talk host who hosted evenings and later middays, was yanked in favor of Joe Scarborough's Morning Joe in April 2009, only to return to middays six months later after Scarborough's show was cancelled.

By late 2009, WMAL's morning-drive through midnight weekday format was uninterrupted conservative talk, with a lineup of Fred Grandy and Andy Parks, Chris Plante, Rush Limbaugh, Sean Hannity, Mark Levin, Joe Scarborough, and Curtis Sliwa. Weekends included gardening host Jos Roozen, investing adviser Ric Edelman and lawyer Michael Collins. John Batchelor replaced Sliwa in November 2009. In April 2010, Parks was laid off from the station, resulting in Plante's and Grandy's shows being merged. At the same time, Scarborough's show was put on extended hiatus. Austin Hill began filling in the middays for the time being, while Mark Simone handled Scarborough's shift. Grandy left WMAL in March 2011.

On September 19, 2011, WMAL began simulcasting its programming on 105.9 FM, now WMAL-FM. The former WMAL-FM, renamed WRQX in 1977, has since become WLVW; it remained co-owned with WMAL until 2019.

In 2017, WMAL started broadcasting games from the Washington Commanders, then named the Washington Redskins, as an affiliate station for the first time since the team's Super Bowl XXVI win in 1992. WMAL previously carried the team's games from 1942 to 1956, and again from 1963 to 1991. WTEM (570 AM), a new sports station at the time, acquired the radio broadcast rights from WMAL for the 1992 NFL season.

As of January 3, 2017, WMAL's weekday lineup consisted of local talent Brian Wilson and Mary Walter in the morning, then Chris Plante, followed by the syndicated Rush Limbaugh, then Larry O'Connor hosts a local afternoon drive show, followed by the syndicated shows of Mark Levin, John Batchelor, and overnight the syndicated show Red Eye Radio, hosted by Eric Harley and Gary McNamara. Brian Wilson was released in May 2017.

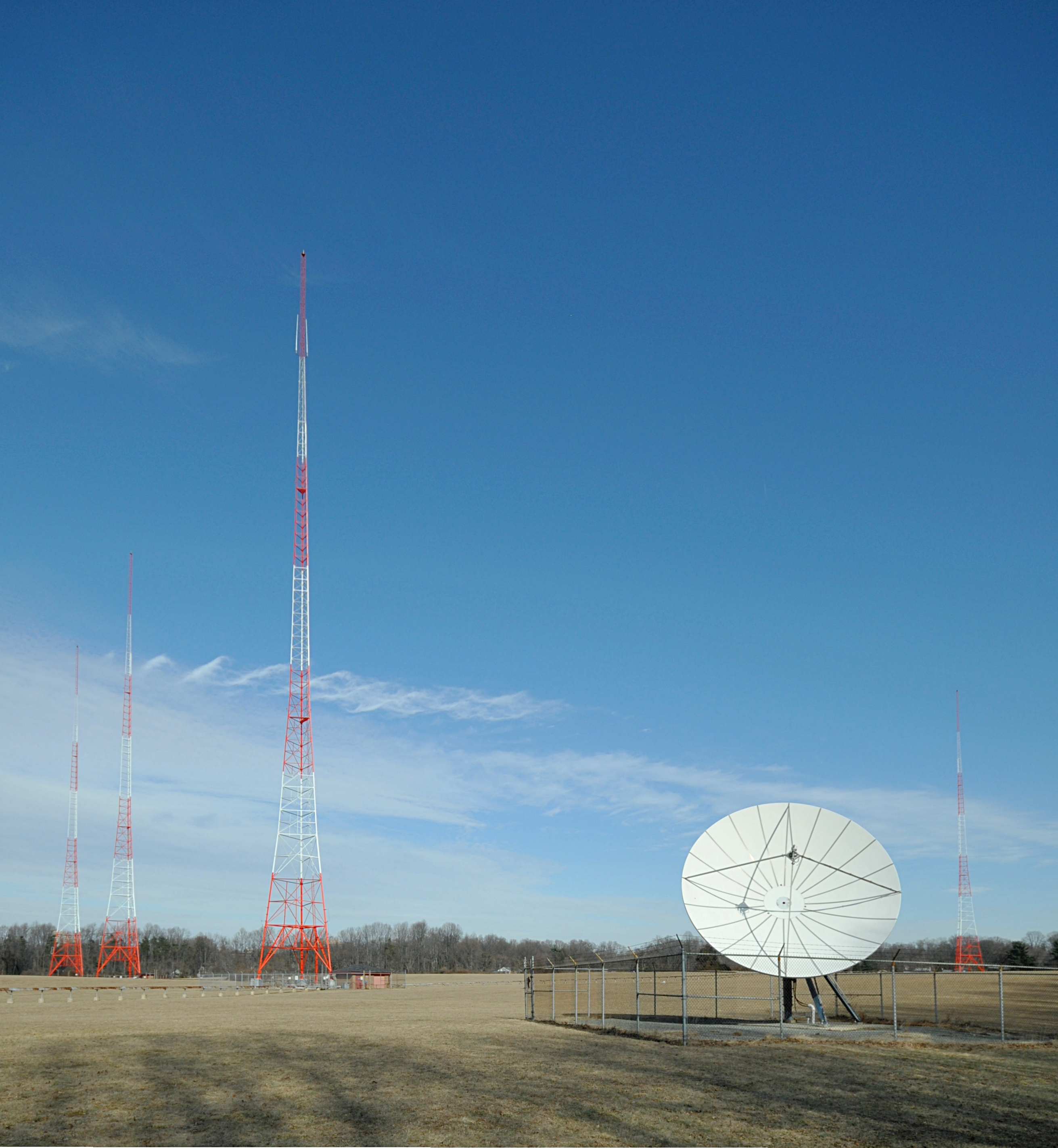
The former WMAL radio tower site in Bethesda, Maryland

In 2015, Cumulus announced that it was planning to sell the station's 75-acre (30-hectare) transmitter site in Bethesda, Maryland, in use since 1941, so it could be redeveloped for high-end housing. On May 12, 2016, WMAL was granted a construction permit by the Federal Communications Commission for a transmitter site relocation. Transmissions from Bethesda ceased on the afternoon of May 1, 2018, with operations switched to the replacement facility at Germantown, Maryland, northwest of the original site and now diplexed with an existing station, WSPZ (later WWRC). Although daytime power remained at 10,000 watts, this relocation resulted in a nighttime power reduction from 5,000 to 2,700 watts. In 2020, the decommissioned Bethesda site was sold to Toll Brothers for $74.1 million, and the Bethesda towers were demolished on November 4, 2020.

=== Flip to sports talk ===
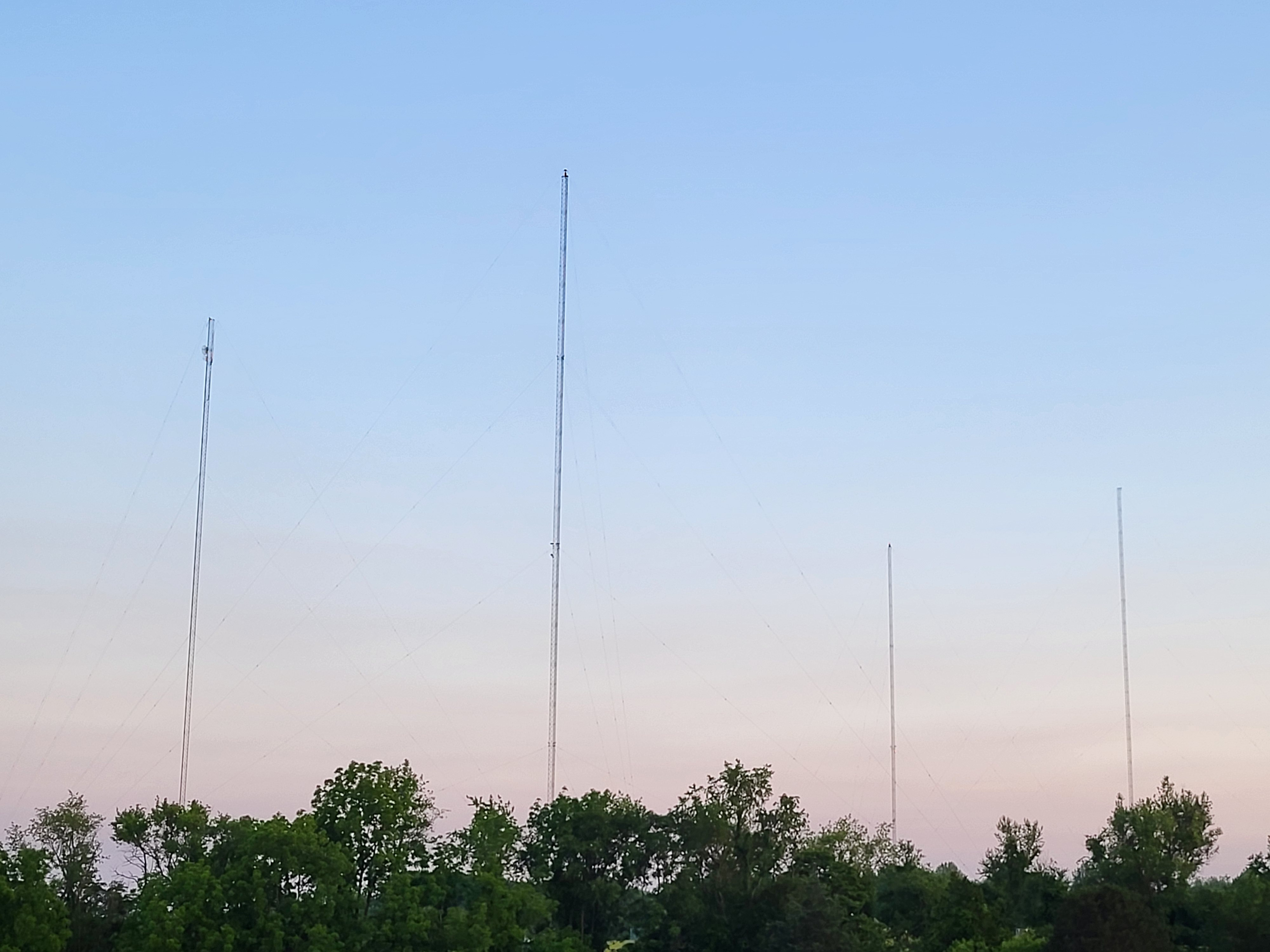
WSBN's radio transmitter tower in unincorporated Montgomery County, Maryland, June 2025.

On June 13, 2019, it was announced that WMAL would break away from the simulcast with WMAL-FM and flip to ESPN Radio on July 1, 2019, as ESPN 630. WMAL replaced WTEM as ESPN Radio's Washington, D.C., affiliate, though both stations continue to share Redskins games, with WTEM as flagship. Concurrent with the format change, WMAL changed its call letters to WSBN; prior to the change, it had been Washington's oldest station to be operating under its original call letters. WSBN signed a four-year radio broadcast rights agreement on June 15, 2022, to serve as the Washington affiliate for the Baltimore Ravens Radio Network.

== Studios ==
WMAL broadcast from various facilities in Washington, D.C., and suburban Maryland until July 25, 1973, when it settled in at its current studio facility at 4400 Jenifer Street NW in Washington, two blocks from the city's border with Maryland.

WMAL's former transmitting facility, located in the Bradley Hills section of suburban Bethesda, Maryland, once housed studios for WMAL and WMAL-FM.

=== Personalities ===
Among the WMAL broadcasters over the years have been Frank Harden and Jackson Weaver, who co-hosted WMAL's morning show for more than four decades until Weaver's death in the early 1990s; Tom Gauger, who also spent several decades at WMAL on the mid-day shift from 10am-3pm; Bill Trumbull was the afternoon drivetime host and paired with several others through two decades, Felix Grant's evening show featured traditional jazz. Grant is credited with introducing Brazil's "bossa nova" music to the US. Arthur Godfrey, a national radio and early-TV personality who briefly broadcast on WMAL in 1933 as "Red" Godfrey; Bill Mayhugh, a mellow-voiced overnight broadcaster; and Ken Beatrice, a sports talk radio pioneer who hosted a call-in show from 1977 to 1995.

The station also kept a local following for a time by broadcasting sports games featuring the Washington Redskins and University of Maryland, College Park Terrapins. Legendary jazz authority Felix Grant broadcast on WMAL for decades.

Support of the local community has been a tradition for WMAL, which founded such innovative fund-raisers as the Leukemia Radiothon and the Gross National Parade, which supported the D.C. Police Boys & Girls Club.

=== News ===
In addition to providing talk programming, WMAL provided local news coverage. With morning anchor Bill Thompson, afternoon anchor Mark Weaver and the team covers news stories affecting the Washington, D.C., area.

=== Jerry Klein's 2006 radio experiment ===
The station aired a radio talk show on November 26, 2006, to gauge his audience's reaction to saying that "force should be applied to ensure that all Muslims in America wear identifying markers...." The hoax was revealed at the end of the program.
