= Woodsy Owl =

Owl character of the U.S. Forest Service used in public awareness campaigns

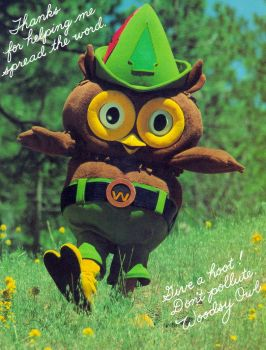
- Text reads: "Thanks for helping me spread the word. Give a hoot! Don't pollute. Woodsy Owl"
- First appearance: September 15, 1971
- Created by: Harold Bell; Glenn Kovar; Chuck Williams; United States Forest Service

In-universe information
- Gender: Male

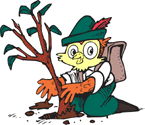
Drawing of "New" Woodsy. "Lend a hand—care for the land!"

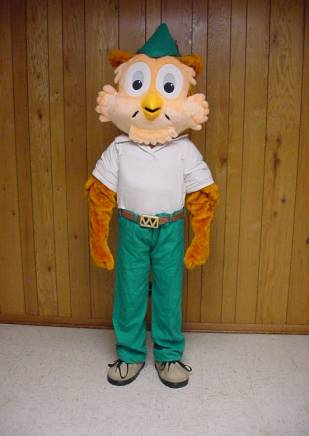
Costume of "New" Woodsy

Woodsy Owl is a national symbol and advertising character for the United States Forest Service to motivate children to form healthy, lasting relationships with nature. Harold Bell of Western Publishing (and the producer of the Smokey Bear public service announcements), along with Glenn Kovar and Chuck Williams, originally created the mascot in 1970 as part of a United States Forest Service campaign to raise awareness of environmental protection. Woodsy Owl has been an integral part of the educational program of the US Forest Service for decades and is particularly active against littering and environmental pollution. Woodsy's original motto was "Give a hoot! Don't pollute" and has since been updated to "Lend a hand—care for the land!" Together with Smokey Bear, Woodsy Owl has become an American environmental icon that has found its way into pop culture in numerous songs, comics, and television appearances.

Woodsy Owl's name, character, and mottos are protected symbols under Public Law 93-318 as property of the United States to be managed by the Secretary of Agriculture.

== Origin ==
Woodsy Owl was created in 1970 as part of the second US environmental movement, in time for the first Earth Day, April 22, 1970. During this phase of growing environmental awareness, Smokey Bear, which has existed since 1944, was increasingly relied on for environmental education. The US Forest Service was concerned that the bear, with the motto of forest fire prevention, could be misused through excessive use. Forest Service officials, therefore, commissioned the development of a new protagonist and message.

Harold Bell, who had worked as a marketing agent for the television show Lassie, created Woodsy Owl together with Chuck Williams and Glenn Kovar, two employees of the Forest Service and technical consultants for the popular television series Lassie, and its collaborator Betty Hite. The Robin Hood-inspired hat Woodsy wears to this day was motivated by a movie item Williams found on the set. Before choosing the owl, a raccoon, bull elk, rainbow trout, and ladybug had been discussed. The decisive factor was that owls are supposed to be wise, live in the forest and near cities, and can see pollution from treetops. This is also alluded to by "The Ballad of Woodsy Owl," in which it says, "Woodsy Owl has got a home on the big branch of a tree / When he looks from left to right, town and forest he can see." After successful test marketing in schools, summer camps, and church groups, Woodsy Owl was registered as a trademark on August 20, 1970 at the US Patent Office. USFS employee Rudy Wendelin, who had already played a key role in the design of Smokey Bear, refined the graphic designs of the figure and breathed "personality" into it.

Woodsy's slogan was officially introduced on September 15, 1971, by Secretary of Agriculture Clifford Hardin. The first Woodsy Owl public service spot was created by US Forest Ranger Chuck Williams, who was the Forest Service's technical consultant for the Lassie TV show which featured a Forest Service Ranger and his family. Williams, along with Bell and Glenn Kovar, also of the US Forest Service, brainstormed the idea for the Woodsy motif name together in Los Angeles, California, in 1970. In 1974, Congress passed the Woodsy Owl Act (Public Law 93-318) to protect the character, making it a federal crime to reproduce his image or original slogan. This was reversed by Division O of the Consolidated Appropriations Act, 2021.

The similarity of Woodsy's role to Johnny Horizon, a mascot character established by the Department of the Interior two years prior to Woodsy's creation, led to delays in the passing of the Woodsy Owl Act. Opposition to the act came from both the Department of the Interior and from companies who had already adopted Johnny Horizon as a mascot. Despite this, the Forest Service argued that Woodsy was more suited as an accompaniment to Smokey, and was designed to have more appeal to children and adolescents, leading to the eventual passing of the act.

Despite the documented history of Woodsy Owl's creation, various rival claims to his parentage have emerged over the years. Several individuals have stated that they invented Woodsy Owl as children as part of a nationwide poster contest. The Forest History Society has said that no evidence of such has been provided.

Several songs have been used in conjunction with the Woodsy Owl environmental campaign, including "The Ballad of Woodsy Owl" and "Help Woodsy Spread the Word". Jon "Bermuda" Schwartz, the drummer for "Weird Al" Yankovic, recorded "The Woodsy Owl Song."

For his appearances in commercials that aired in the 1970s and 1980s, Woodsy was voiced by several actors, including Sterling Holloway, Barry Gordon, Dave Kimber, and Frank Welker.

Several other environmentalism-, conservation- or outdoor-themed comics and characters have appeared over the years, including Mark Trail and Smokey Bear. Woodsy Owl appeared as a comic by Gold Key Comics from 1973 to 1976.

=== Costume disposal ===
In 2009, the Forest Service published instructions on the destruction of old and outdated Woodsy Owl costumes, which were no longer permitted after a redesign.

1. Incinerate the complete costume with the oversight of an official USDA Forest Service law enforcement officer.

2. The entire Woodsy Owl costume including each of the separate pieces is to be destroyed beyond recognition.

If you do not have access to an official USDA Forest Service law enforcement representative, arrangements will be made for dealing with your costume by contacting the USDA-FS Washington Office

=== Skip the Bin! Turn Your Batteries In! ===
In January 2026, the National Waste & Recycling Association partnered with the United States Forest Service to launch a national PSA campaign featuring Woodsy Owl at CES in Las Vegas. Titled "Skip the Bin! Turn Your Batteries In!", the campaign utilizes Woodsy Owl to educate the public on the fire hazards of throwing lithium-ion batteries into standard household trash or recycling bins. The initiative directs consumers to its official website, batterysafetynow.org, which provides educational resources, an interactive battery drop-off locator, and listings for local community take-back events.

== See also ==
- Johnny Horizon
- Mark Trail
- Smokey Bear
