= Chris Berry (broadcaster) =

American broadcaster

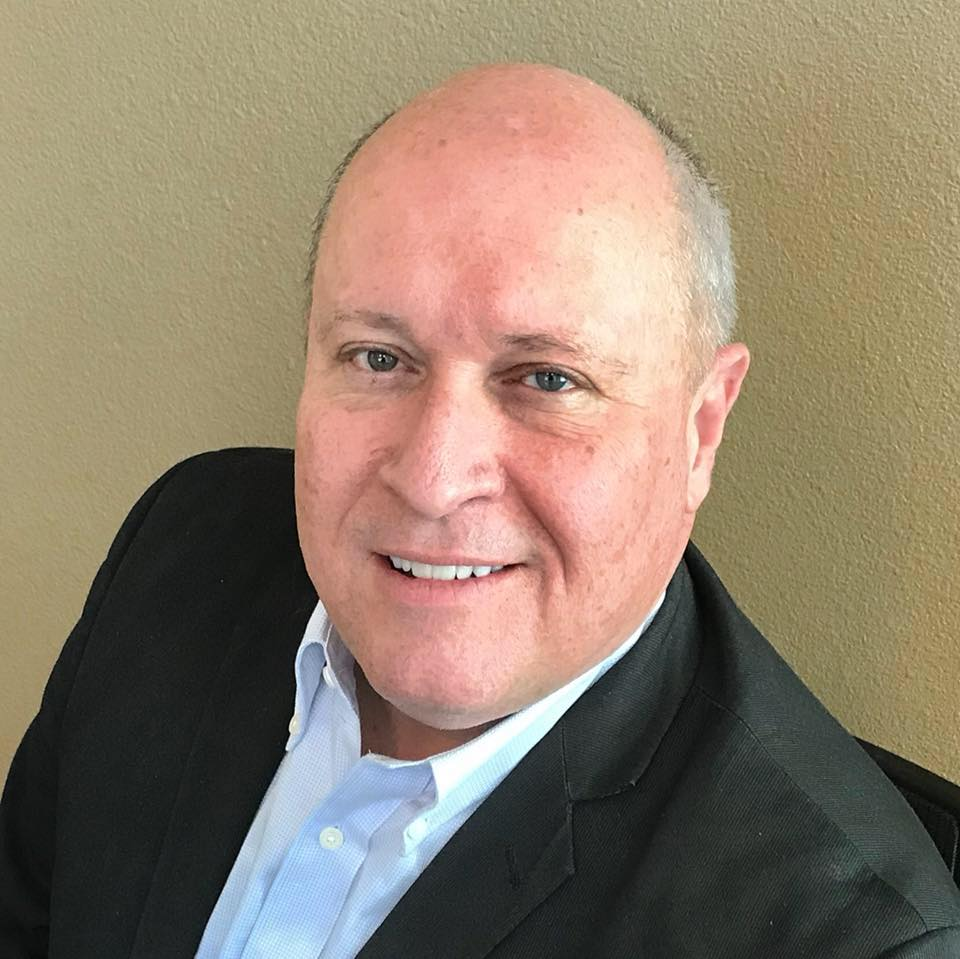
- Born: Decatur, Illinois, United States
- Education: University of Mississippi
- Occupations: Broadcaster, journalist
- Years active: 1980s–present
- Employers: BBC Radio Leeds; The Yorkshire Post
- Notable work: The Countryman (columns)

Chris Berry is an American broadcaster whose career has included newsroom and management roles for some of the largest communications firms in the United States. As executive vice president of news, talk and sports programming for iHeartMedia he is responsible for overseeing the company's news, talk and sports brands.

== Biography ==
Berry was born in Decatur, Illinois, to Richard L. Berry and Phyllis (née Phipps) Berry. He grew up in Bradenton, Florida, where he attended Manatee High School. He is a 1981 graduate of the University of Mississippi, where he received degrees in journalism and business.

Berry's broadcast career began at WHBQ-TV in Memphis, Tennessee, where he served as producer of Eyewitness News at Six. In 1982 he relocated to CBS Radio in Los Angeles. During his 14 years at CBS he served in various management roles at KNX-AM Los Angeles, CBS Radio News, Washington, D.C. and WBBM (AM) Chicago, where he was director of news and programming from 1990 to 1996. Berry joined The Walt Disney Company and its ABC News Radio division in New York City in 1996.

After serving as general manager of operations for the network, he was promoted to vice president and general manager of News for the ABC Radio Network in 2000. In that role Berry was responsible for all national and international news coverage for the network, along with the Paul Harvey News and Comment broadcasts which were heard over 1,200 radio stations in the United States and 400 Armed Forces Radio Stations. From 2002 until 2009 he served as president and general manager of Disney-owned WMAL (AM) Washington, DC. In 2009, he was assigned to KSPN (AM) in Los Angeles, where as president and general manager he was responsible for the launch of ESPNLA.com, a website which focused on sporting events in Southern California.

Berry joined Metro Networks (now TTWN Media Networks) as senior vice president, general manager of 24/7 News Network in March 2011, at the time of the network's purchase by Clear Channel, now known as iHeartMedia. In July 2016 iHeartMedia began syndicating NBC News Radio as part of its news portfolio with Berry responsible for editorial content produced by the network. 24/7 News Network is a national news and sports broadcast network which provides text and audio to approximately 1,000 radio stations and associated websites across the United States. In June 2020 Berry was involved in programming iHeartMedia's Black Information Network.

== Supreme Court broadcast ==
While serving as vice president and general manager for ABC News Radio, Berry was also a member of the board of directors of the Radio-Television News Directors Association. During the time that he served on the board of the organization he was at the forefront of a petition before the United States Supreme Court to broadcast the arguments in the landmark case of Bush v. Gore, which determined the outcome of the 2000 U.S. presidential election. The taped courtroom remarks on December 12, 2000 was the first time that U.S. Supreme Court procedures had been broadcast.

== Awards and accomplishments ==
Berry is the recipient of a number of national broadcast awards, sharing a George Foster Peabody Award for his work leading the ABC News Radio team in its coverage of the September 11 attacks in New York, Washington and Shanksville, Pennsylvania. In 2002 he was also honored by Radio And Records - R&R magazine as its News/Talk Executive of the Year. In 2000 the Radio-Television News Directors Association presented him with the Rob Downey Award for exceptional service to the Broadcast News Industry. In 2008 Berry and his staff at WMAL-AM were awarded the Marconi Award "Major Market Station of the Year" by the National Association of Broadcasters.

== Community involvement ==
Berry has been involved in a variety of industry and community organizations throughout his career. In addition to his position on the board of directors of the Radio Television News Directors Association from 1997 to 2002, he is a former board member of The Chicago Press Club, and was Chairman of the International Radio Festival in 2004 and 2005. From 2003 to 2009, he was a member of the Greater Washington Board of Trade, where he served as Chairman of the organization's Emergency Preparedness Task Force. During his time in Washington he served on the board of directors of the Fairfax County, Virginia, Chamber of Commerce. Also while in Washington he was a board member of Junior Achievement of Greater Washington, from 2006 to 2009. After relocating to Los Angeles he continued his involvement with Junior Achievement, as a board member of Junior Achievement of Southern California from 2009 to 2011.
