= Jackson Weaver =

American broadcaster and voice actor

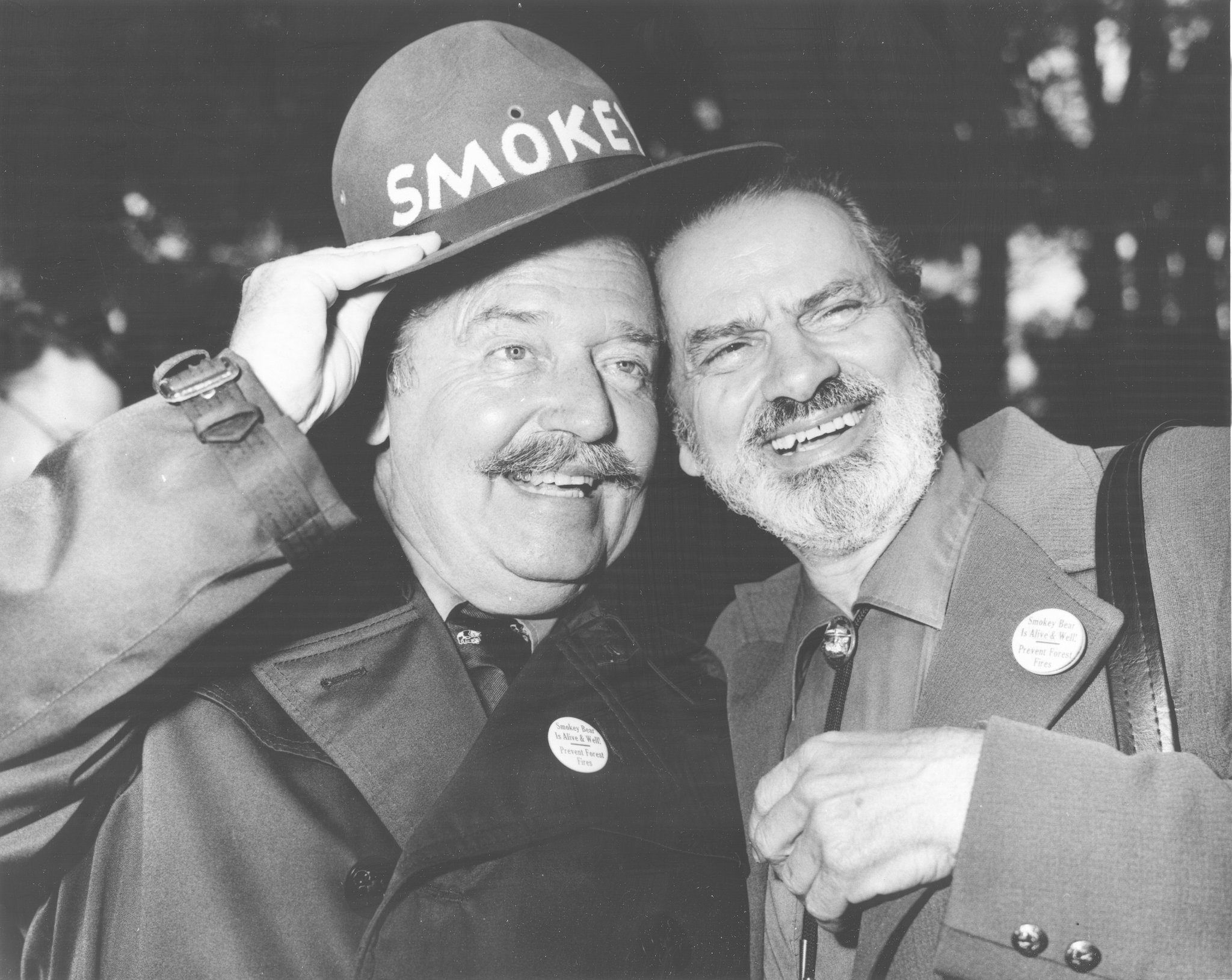
- Weaver (left)
- Born: Jackson J. Weaver; September 3, 1920; Buffalo, New York
- Died: October 20, 1992 (aged 72); Silver Spring, Maryland
- Presenting career
- Station: WMAL
- Time slot: Monday-Friday 6AM

Jackson J. Weaver (September 3, 1920 – October 20, 1992) was an American broadcaster and voice actor.

== Career ==
In addition to being the original voice for Smokey Bear as seen on the 1969 cartoon The Smokey Bear Show, he was the co-host of WMAL's Washington, D.C. morning drive program for 32 years, along with his broadcast partner Frank Harden.

== Death ==
Weaver's final broadcast was on October 14, 1992, only six days before his death.

== Filmography ==
Year	Title	Role(s)	Notes
1956	In the Bag	Smokey Bear (voice)	Short film
1957	Red Riding Hoodlum	Smokey Bear (voice)	Short film
1969–1971	The Smokey Bear Show	Smokey Bear (voice)	17 episodes
1966	The Big Valley	Doctor	Episode: "The Martyr"
