= Townhall =

American politically conservative mass media company

- Website type: Conservative news, analysis, opinion website, videos, podcasts and radio news service
- Available in: English
- Owners: The Heritage Foundation (1995–2005); Independent (2005–2006); Salem Media Group (2006–present)
- Editors: Larry O'Connor
- President: Jonathan Garthwaite, publisher
- Website: townhall.com
- Commercial: Yes
- Registration: Optional, required to comment
- Launched: March 2, 1995; 31 years ago
- Current status: Online

Townhall is an American conservative website, print magazine and radio news service. The website features more than 80 columns (both syndicated and exclusive) by a variety of writers and commentators.

Townhall provides five minute radio newscasts around the clock, detailing national and world news items. These newscasts air hourly on Salem-owned radio stations, Salem Radio Network affiliates, and on SiriusXM Patriot Channel 125.

== History ==
Townhall was founded on March 2, 1995, as one of the first conservative internet communities. It was available on CompuServe. In 2005, Townhall.com split off from The Heritage Foundation.

In May 2006, Salem Communications acquired Townhall.com and relaunched the site with the addition of podcasts of Salem's network and local talk shows, blogs run by Salem talk show hosts and the ability for any user to set up a blog on the Townhall.com network. The website provides an extensive selection of opinion columns and news items presented from a conservative viewpoint.

In January 2008, Townhall.com launched Townhall Magazine, a monthly conservative news magazine. In addition to exclusive content for the magazine, Townhall Magazine carries contributions from Townhall.com readers. In January 2026, Townhall Media, a subsidiary of Salem Media Group, appointed radio personality Larry O'Connor as editor of Townhall.com.

== Reception ==
In November 2021, a study by the Center for Countering Digital Hate described Townhall as being among "ten fringe publishers" that together were responsible for nearly 70 percent of Facebook user interactions with content that denied climate change. Facebook disputed the study's methodology.
