= Andy Ockershausen =

American radio executive (1929–2021)

- Born: March 14, 1929; Washington, D.C., U.S.
- Died: March 17, 2021 (aged 92); Annapolis, MD
- Education: American University; University of Maryland
- Occupation: Media Executive

Andrew M. Ockershausen (March 14, 1929 – March 17, 2021) was a Washington area radio executive at WMAL-FM where he served as the manager for 27 years. He also hosted the radio show "Our Town" where he spoke about life in Washington D.C. during the 20th century. He ascended to that title after 10 years working, starting in 1949. He died from medical complications from a fall he suffered in 2021.

== Early life and education ==
Ockershausen was born in Washington, D.C.. He grew up in Northeast DC where he graduated from Eastern High School in 1947. He attended the University of Maryland and American University.

== Career ==
Ockershausen began his career as a page in 1949 at WMAL, the powerhouse radio station that dominated Washington airwaves, and rose to general manager in 1965 during a 36-year career there. He joined sports cable network Home Team Sports in 1986 and was an executive with what became NBC Sports Washington. Ockershausen created the Andy O. Award which was annually presented to an employee who epitomized dedication, hard work and longevity.

== Personal life and death ==
Ockershausen married 3 times. His first two marriages ended in divorce and in 1993 he married Janice Iacona. The couple remained married until his death

Andy Ockershausen died three days after his 92nd birthday on March 17, 2021. He is survived by his wife Janice, two sons from his second marriage and two grandchildren.
