= Rudy Wendelin =

United States Forest Service artist (1910–2000)

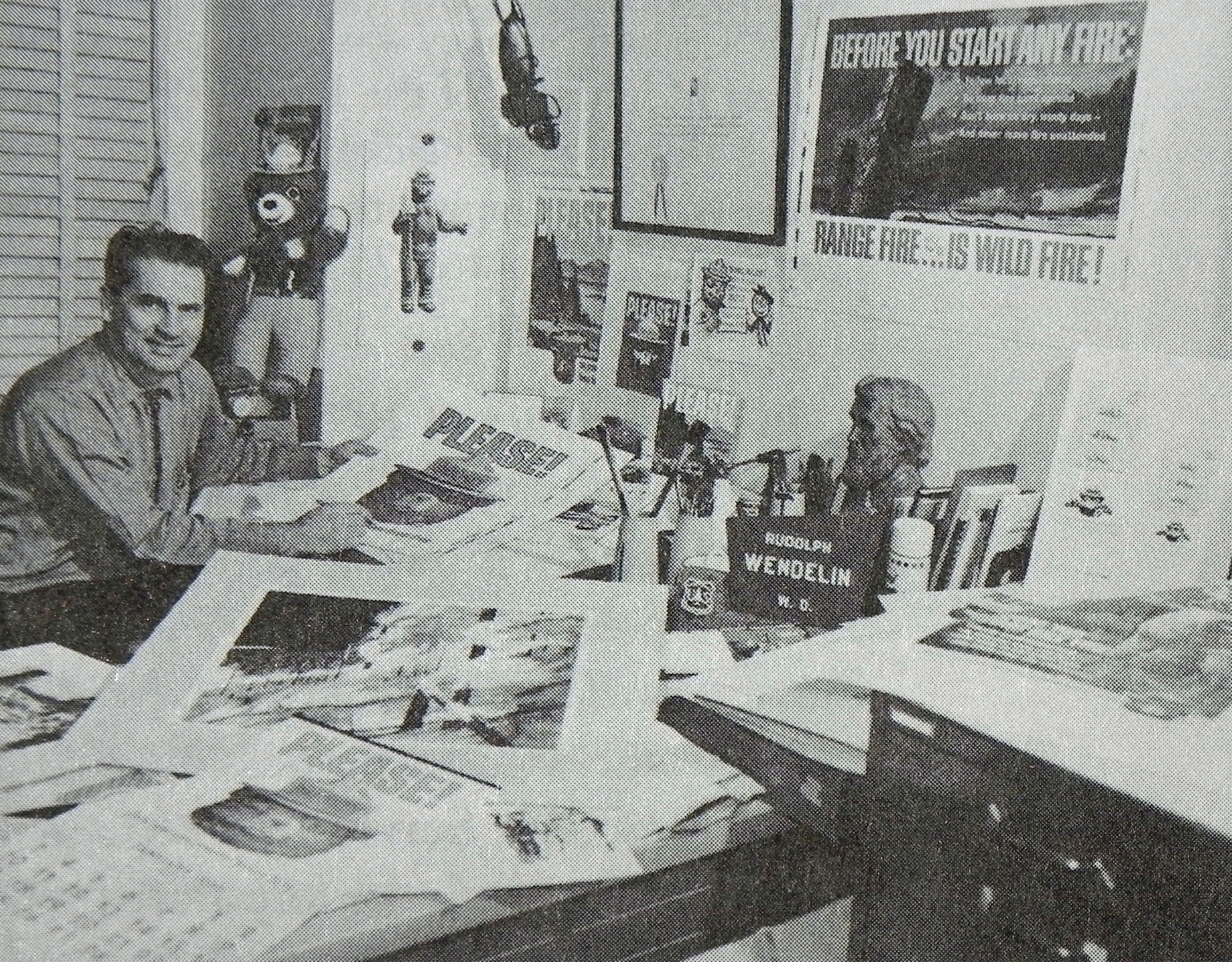
Rudy Wendelin c. 1960

Rudolph Andreas Michael Wendelin (1910–2000) was a United States Forest Service employee and the best-known artist behind Smokey Bear. Beginning in 1944, Wendelin became the full-time artist for the Smokey Bear campaign. He was considered Smokey Bear's "caretaker" until his retirement in 1973.

Wendelin was born in Herndon, Kansas on February 27, 1910. He studied architecture at the University of Kansas, and studied art at several art schools. He went to work for the U.S. Forest Service in 1933 as an illustrator and draftsman. He served in the United States Navy during World War II and returned to the Forest Service after the war. He completed hundreds of paintings of Smokey Bear.

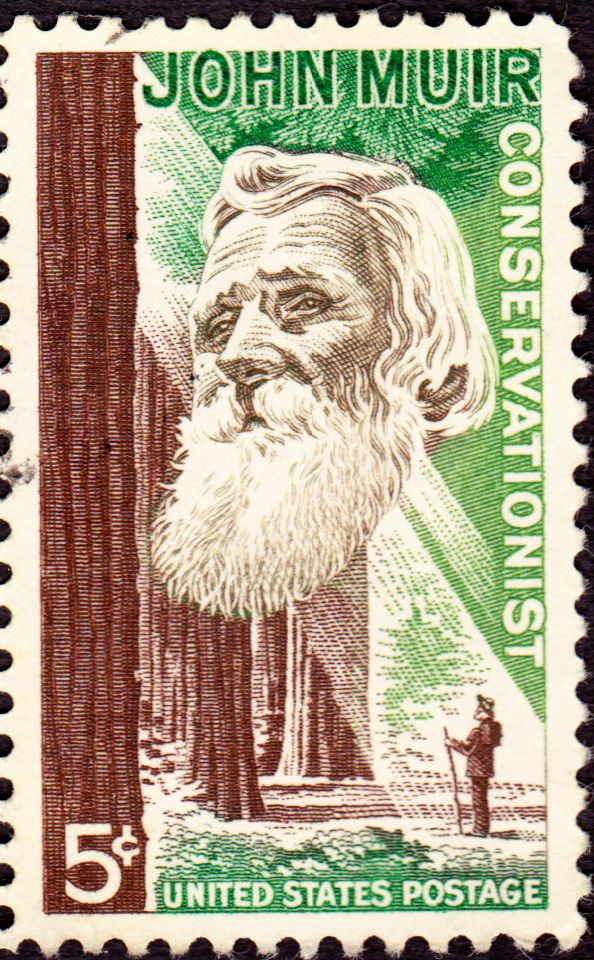
Rudy Wendelin designed this 1964 U.S. commemorative stamp honoring John Muir

Wendelin designed several commemorative U.S. postage stamps. Among these were a Forest Conservation stamp in 1958, a Range Conservation stamp in 1961, a stamp honoring John Muir in 1964, a stamp honoring John Wesley Powell in 1969, and a Smokey Bear stamp in 1984.

Wendelin received the Medal of Honor from the Daughters of the American Revolution in 1998 for his work on the Smokey Bear campaign.

Wendelin was seriously injured in a car accident on August 18, 2000, when a car driven by his daughter lost control and collided with a truck and a highway divider. He died as a result of those injuries in a nursing home in Falls Church, Virginia on August 31, 2000.
