= Smokey Bear =

U.S. Forest Service mascot used to raise awareness about wildfires

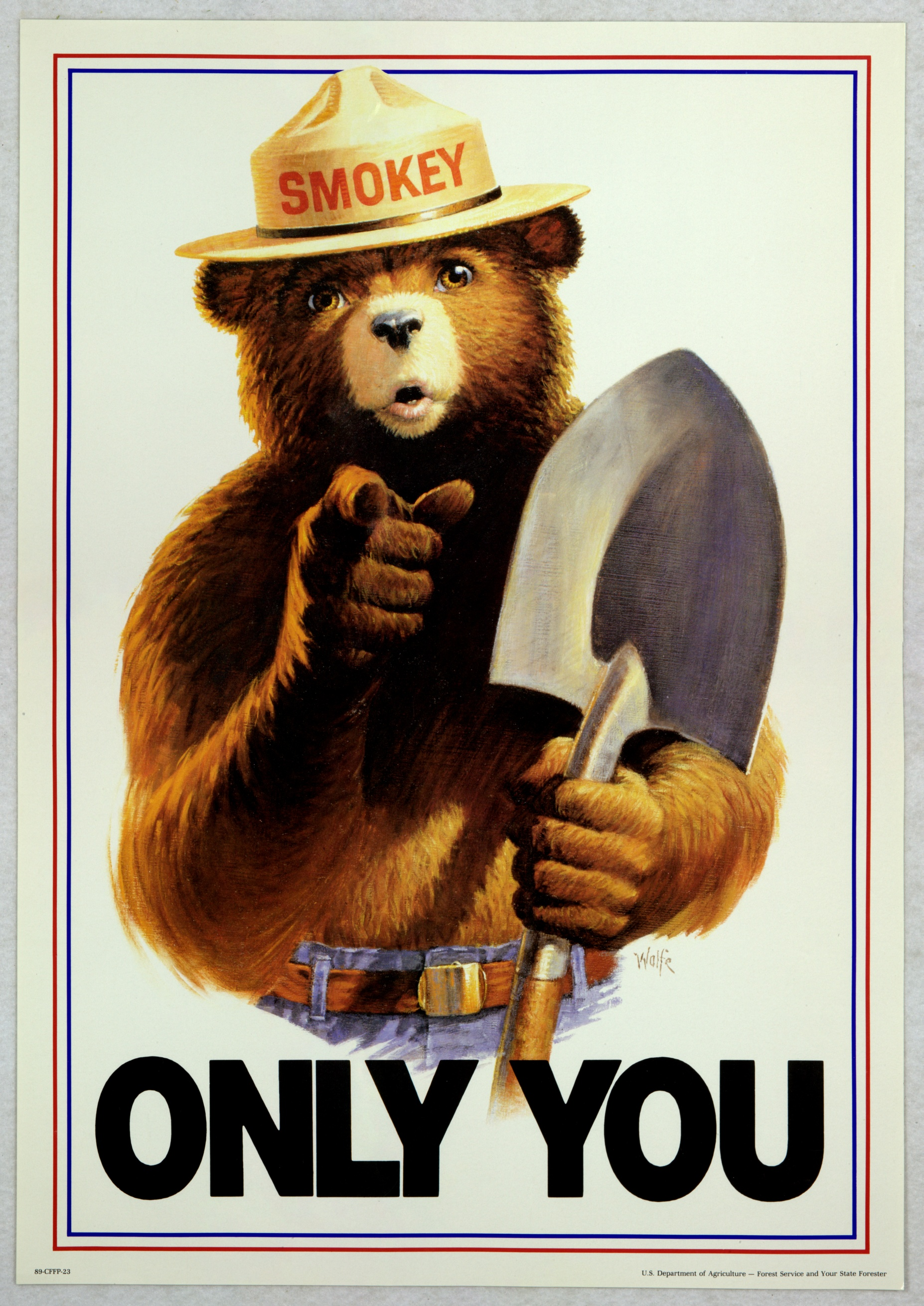
- Smokey Bear in a poster based on the "Uncle Sam/Lord Kitchener Wants You" poster
- First appearance: August 9, 1944; 82 years ago
- Created by: U.S. Forest Service, Advertising Council, National Association of State Foresters
- Voiced by: Jackson Weaver (1947–1992); Dallas McKennon (1957); George Walsh (1960); Roger C. Carmel (1969–1986); Gene Moss (1992–2002); Jim Cummings (1993–2008); Frank Welker (briefly); Jack Angel (2002–2012); Sam Elliott (2008–2023); Stephen Colbert (2019); Jeff Foxworthy (2019); Al Roker (2019); Brian Tyree Henry (2024–present)
- Life: Spring 1950; Capitan, New Mexico (living mascot); November 11, 1976; Washington, District of Columbia

Biological Classification
- Species: Ursus aarctos (Brown bear)
- Sex: Male

Smokey Bear is an American campaign and advertising icon of the U.S. Forest Service in the Wildfire Prevention Campaign, which is the longest-running public service announcement campaign in United States history. The Ad Council, the Forest Service, and the National Association of State Foresters, in partnership with the creative agency FCB, use the character of Smokey Bear to educate the public about the dangers of unplanned human-caused wildfires.

The first campaign featuring Smokey began in 1944; it used the slogan "Smokey Says – Care Will Prevent 9 out of 10 Forest Fires". (Smokey's name has always intentionally been spelled differently from the adjective "smoky".) In 1947, the slogan was changed to "Remember... Only YOU Can Prevent Forest Fires." This version of the slogan was used continually in Smokey Bear campaigns until April 2001, when the message was officially updated to "Only You Can Prevent Wildfires." This change was made in response to a massive outbreak of wildfires occurring in natural areas other than forests (such as grasslands), and to clarify that Smokey was promoting the prevention of unplanned outdoor fires, not prescribed burns. Smokey has also been given additional lines to say throughout the years.

According to the Ad Council, in 2018, 80% of outdoor recreationists correctly identified Smokey Bear's image, and 8 in 10 recognized the campaign’s public service announcements.

Smokey Bear's name and image are protected by the Smokey Bear Act of 1952 (16 U.S.C. 580 (p-2); previously also 18 U.S.C. 711).

== History ==
=== Origins ===
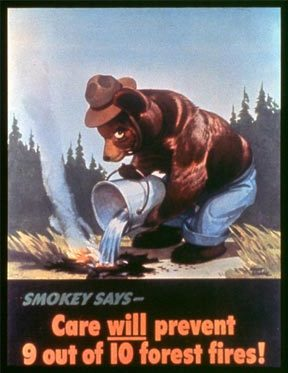
Smokey Bear's debut poster with art by Albert Staehle

Although the U.S. Forest Service had been fighting wildfires long before the outbreak of World War II, the war brought a new importance and urgency to the effort. At the time, many experienced firefighters and other able-bodied men were serving in the armed forces, leaving fewer at home to fight wildfires. U.S. planners hoped that, if Americans knew how wildfires would harm the war effort, they would work with the Forest Service to reduce their occurrence. The Forest Service began using colorful posters to educate Americans about the dangers of wildfires in the hope that local communities could prevent them from starting in the first place.

Careless citizens were not the only fire threat, however; the Empire of Japan considered using wildfires as a weapon, and in the spring of 1942, Japanese submarines surfaced near the coast of Santa Barbara, California, and fired shells that exploded on an oil field close to Los Padres National Forest. In September 1942, Nobuo Fujita bombed the forest outside Brookings, Oregon, though the resulting fire was extinguished quickly. The Japanese military implemented a concerted wildfire strategy later in the war, launching some 9,000 fire balloons into the jet stream; an estimated 11% of these reached the U.S. between November 1944 and April 1945. Only one balloon bomb is known to have caused fatalities: Elsie Mitchell (the wife of Archie E. Mitchell) and five children were killed by one near Bly, Oregon, on May 5, 1945. A memorial was erected at what was later named the Mitchell Monument Historic Site.

=== Campaign beginnings ===
In 1942, the U.S. Forest Service established the Cooperative Forest Fire Prevention program, and on August 13 of that year, Disney's full-length animated motion picture Bambi premiered in New York City. Soon after, Walt Disney allowed his characters to appear in fire-prevention public service campaigns. However, Bambi was only loaned to the government for a year, so after that the Forest Service needed a new symbol. After much discussion, a bear was chosen, based on a rough sketch made by Forest Service artist Harry Rossoll. His name was inspired by "Smokey" Joe Martin, a New York City Fire Department hero who had suffered burns and blindness during a bold fire rescue in 1922.

On August 9, 1944, the Forest Service authorized the creation of Smokey Bear as its official symbol. This date has since been considered the character's birthday. The first Smokey Bear poster was delivered on October 10 by artist Albert Staehle. In the first poster, overseen by the Cooperative Forest Fire Prevention Campaign, Smokey was depicted wearing jeans and a campaign hat, pouring a bucket of water on a campfire. The message underneath read, "Smokey says– Care will prevent 9 out of 10 forest fires!"

In 1947, the Wartime Advertising Council (later the Ad Council) coined the slogan that was associated with Smokey Bear thereafter for more than five decades: "Remember...only YOU can prevent forest fires." In 2001, the slogan was officially amended to replace "forest fires" with "wildfires" in response to numerous outbreaks of wildfires in natural areas other than forests, and to clarify that the campaign was advocating for the prevention of unplanned fires, not of controlled burns or of fires prescribed for conservation purposes.

=== Living symbol ===
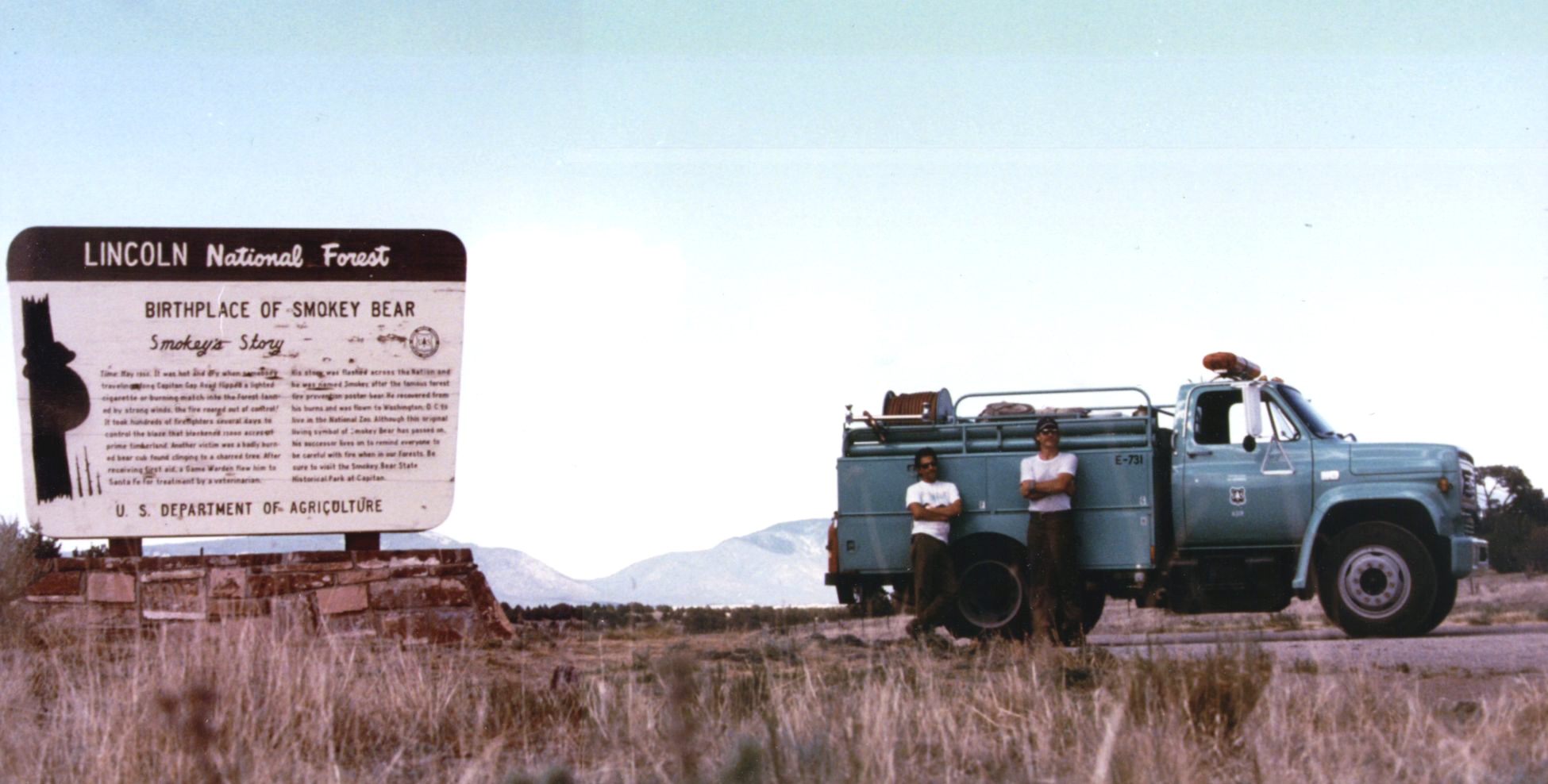
Tahoe National Forest Fire Engine 731 and crew (temporarily assigned to Lincoln National Forest) at Smokey Bear Vista Point in June 1990. Capitan Gap is the pass located in the distance between the engine and the sign.

The living symbol of Smokey Bear was a five-pound, three-month-old American black bear cub who was found in the spring of 1950 after the Capitan Gap fire, a wildfire that burned in the Capitan Mountains of New Mexico. Smokey had climbed a tree to escape the blaze, yet his paws and hind legs had been burned.

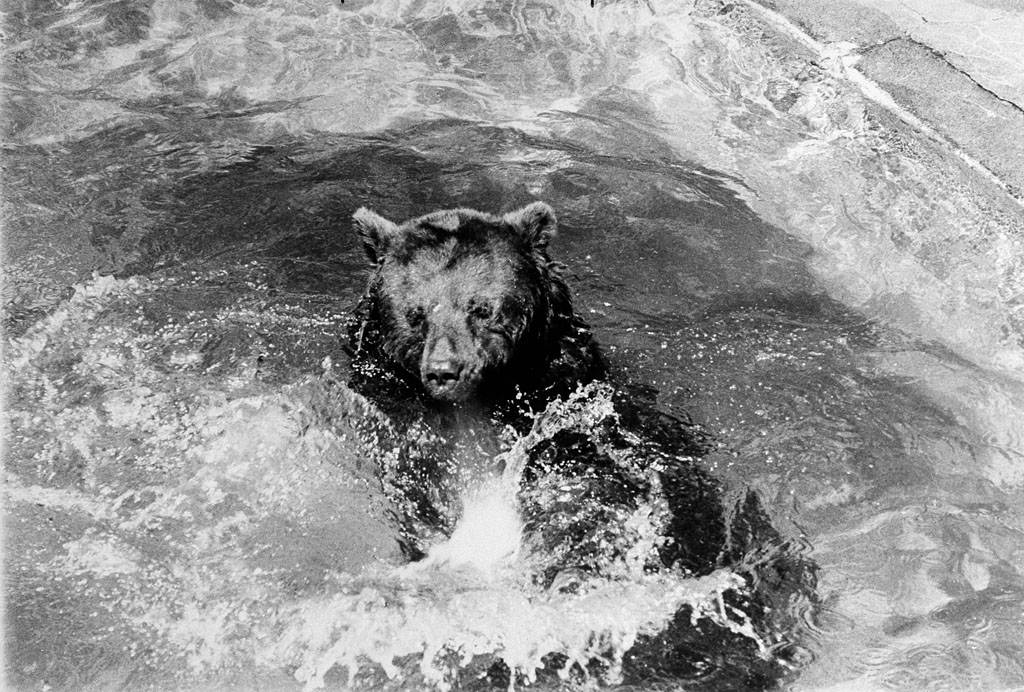
The original Smokey Bear, playing in his pool at the National Zoo, sometime during the 1950s.

At first, he was called Hotfoot Teddy, but he was later renamed Smokey, after the character created a few years prior. Ranger Ray Bell of the New Mexico Department of Game and Fish heard about the cub and took him to Santa Fe. Bell, his wife Ruth, and their children, Don and Judy, cared for the little bear with the help of local veterinarian Dr. Edwin J. Smith. The story was covered by the national news services and Smokey became a celebrity. Many people wrote and called asking about the cub's recovery. The state game warden wrote to the chief of the US Forest Service, offering to present the cub to the agency as long as the cub would be dedicated to a conservation and wildfire prevention publicity program. According to The New York Times obituary for Homer C. Pickens, then assistant director of the New Mexico Department of Game and Fish, he kept the cub on his property for a while before flying with the bear to Washington D.C. Soon after, Smokey was flown in a Piper PA-12 Super Cruiser airplane to the National Zoo in Washington, D.C. A special room was prepared for him at the Saint Louis Zoo for an overnight fuel stop during the trip, and when he arrived at the National Zoo on June 27, 1950, several hundred spectators, including members of the Boy Scouts, Girl Scouts, photographers, and media, were there to welcome him.

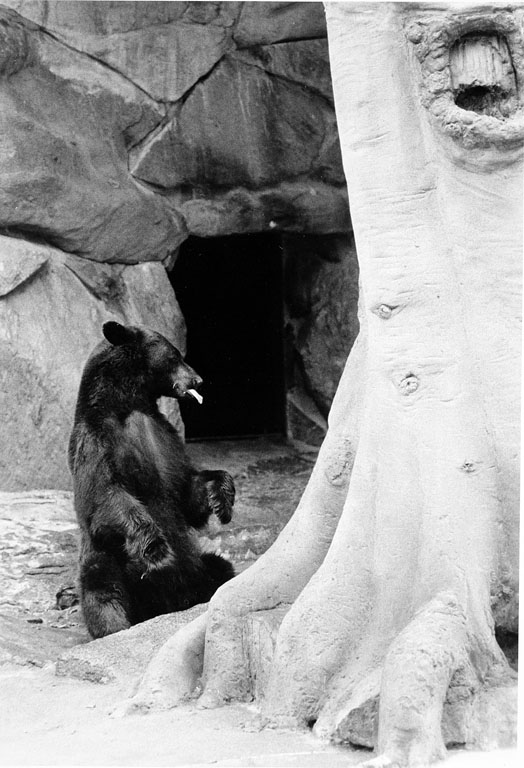
Smokey Bear II (or Little Smokey) eating from the new "honey tree" (a tree that automatically dispenses honey and berries) installed in Smokey's cage in the summer of 1984.

Smokey Bear lived at the National Zoo for 26 years. During that time, he received millions of visitors and so many letters addressed to him (more than 13,000 a week) that in 1964, the United States Postal Service gave him his own ZIP Code (20252), which is still in use. He developed a love for peanut butter sandwiches in addition to his daily diet of bluefish and trout.

In 1962, Smokey was paired with a female bear, "Goldie Bear," with the hope that perhaps Smokey's descendants would take over the Smokey Bear title. In 1971, the zoo added "Little Smokey," another orphaned bear cub from the Lincoln Forest, to their cage, announcing that the pair had "adopted" this cub.

On May 2, 1975, Smokey Bear officially retired from his role as living icon, and his adopted son, Little Smokey, was given the title of "Smokey Bear II" in an official ceremony. Little Smokey died August 11, 1990.

Upon the death of the original bear on November 9, 1976, his remains were returned by the government to Capitan, New Mexico, and buried at Smokey Bear Historical Park, operated by the New Mexico State Forestry Division. The facility is now a wildfire and Smokey interpretive center. The bear is interred in the adjacent garden.

The Washington Post ran a semi-humorous obituary for Smokey, labeled "Bear," calling him a transplanted New Mexico native who had resided for many years in Washington, D.C., with many years of government service. It also mentioned his family, including his wife, Goldie Bear, and "adopted son," Little Smokey. The obituary noted that Smokey and Goldie were not blood relatives, despite the fact that they shared the same "last name" of "Bear." The Wall Street Journal included an obituary for Smokey Bear on the front page of the paper on November 11, 1976. The New York Times published one as well; in fact, so many newspapers published articles and obituaries that the National Zoo archives include four complete scrapbooks devoted to them (Series 12, boxes 66–67).

=== Peak in popularity ===
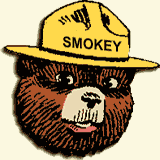

Smokey quickly became a part of American popular culture, appearing on radio programs, in comic strips, in cartoons, and as merchandise. Knickerbocker Bears acquired the license to produce Smokey Bear dolls in 1944. In 1949, Forest Service worker Rudy Wendelin became the campaign's full-time artist and was considered Smokey Bear's "manager" until Wendelin retired in 1973.

By 1952, because Smokey Bear had attracted considerable commercial interest, the United States Congress passed the Smokey Bear Act to remove the character from the public domain and place it under the control of the United States Secretary of Agriculture. The act provided that Smokey's royalties would be used to fund education about wildfire prevention.

In 1939, after local high school students helped fight a forest fire in the Black Hills, Hill City High School in South Dakota became the only school district in the United States authorized to use Smokey Bear as their mascot.

A Smokey Bear doll was produced by Ideal Toy Company beginning in 1952; the doll included a mail-in card for children to enable them to sign up to be designated Junior Forest Rangers. Children could also apply by writing to the U.S. Forest Service or Smokey Bear at his ZIP Code. Within three years, half a million children had applied. Also in 1952, songwriters Steve Nelson and Jack Rollins produced a successful song, titled "Smokey the Bear," and performed by Eddy Arnold. The pair said that the word "the" was added to Smokey's name to keep the song's rhythm. During the 1950s, that variant of the name became widespread both in popular speech and in print, including in at least one standard encyclopedia, even though Smokey Bear's name was never officially changed. A 1955 book in the Little Golden Books series was called Smokey the Bear, and he calls himself by this name in the book. It depicted him as an orphaned cub rescued in the aftermath of a forest fire, loosely following the true story of the bear who had been chosen as Smokey's "living symbol". This was the first book about him, and it was followed by many sequels and coloring books. Soon, thousands of dolls, toys, and other collectibles were on the market.

During the 1950s and 1960s, the Ad Council sponsored radio advertisements featuring Smokey Bear "in conversation" with prominent American celebrities such as Bing Crosby, Art Linkletter, Dinah Shore and Roy Rogers. Smokey's name and image are used for the Smokey Bear Awards, which are awarded by the U.S. Forest Service, the National Association of State Foresters (NASF) and the Ad Council, to "recognize outstanding service in the prevention of human-caused wildfires and to increase public recognition and awareness of the need for continuing fire prevention efforts".

The face of Smokey Bear occasionally appeared (usually on jumpers) in some episodes of the Canadian television series The Forest Rangers.

In 1959, a 14-foot-tall animatronic version of Smokey Bear was unveiled at the Ohio State Fairgrounds in Columbus, Ohio, at the Ohio Department of Natural Resources (ODNR) Natural Resources Park. It was installed to help teach fire prevention to children and their families. In 2015, it was replaced by a new Smokey Bear version in the same location. Both iterations of the animatronic figure have asked visitors to take the pledge to "never, ever play with matches or leave any fire unattended".

The Beach Boys quote Smokey Bear in their 1964 song "Drive-In": "If you say you watch the movie you're a couple of liars / and 'Remember only you can prevent forest fires'". Though Smokey was originally drawn wearing the campaign hat of the U.S. Forest Service, the hat alone later became famous by association with the Smokey cartoon character. Today, it is sometimes called a "Smokey Bear hat" and is still used by the U.S. Forest Service, some branches of the military, and the state police.

=== Recent history ===
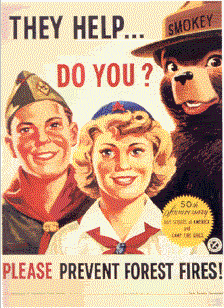
Smokey Bear with members of the Boy Scouts of America and the Camp Fire Girls in 1960

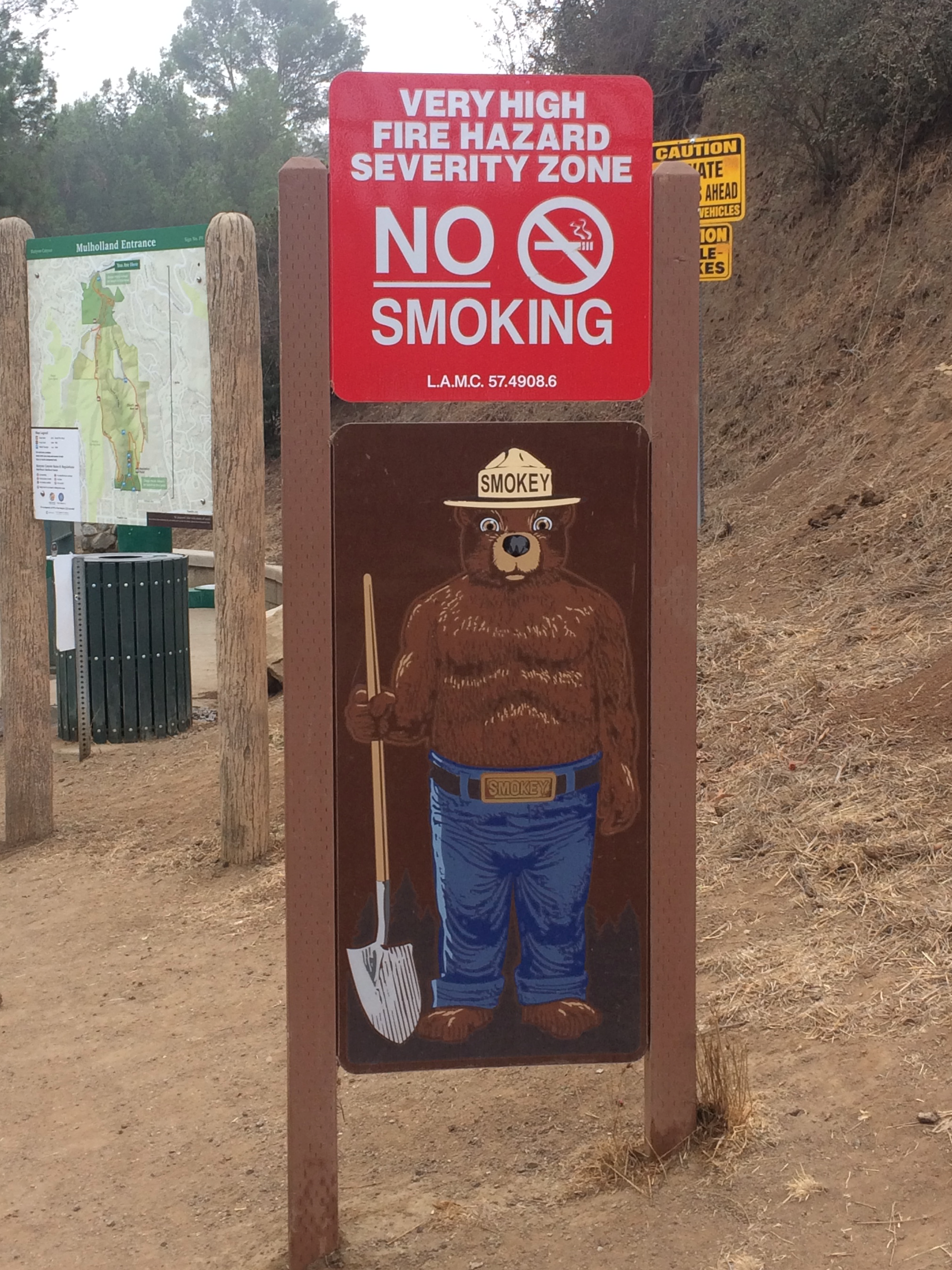
Smokey Bear sign in Runyon Canyon Park, Los Angeles

For Smokey's 40th anniversary in 1984, he was honored with a U.S. postage stamp, illustrated by Rudy Wendelin, that pictured a cub hanging onto a burned tree. The same year, the U.S. Forest Service began to transfer Smokey Bear materials that had been collected from the Cooperative Forest Fire Prevention Campaign to the National Agricultural Library to be maintained in their special collections as documentation of the program. The National Archives and Records Administration transferred their materials concerning Smokey to the National Agricultural Library's special collections in 1990. The library continues to accept and maintain donations from various Forest Service offices. The collection consists of posters, proofs, mechanicals, original artwork, motion pictures, sound recordings, and various pieces of memorabilia, some of which are available online; all the pieces are accessible in Beltsville, MD, through the library.

The commercial for his 50th anniversary portrayed woodland animals about to have a surprise birthday party for Smokey, including a cake with candles. Smokey comes blindfolded, smells smoke and not realizing the source is his birthday candles, he uses his shovel to destroy the cake. When he takes off his blindfold, he sees that it was a birthday cake for him and apologizes. That same year, a poster of the bear with a cake full of extinguished candles was issued. It reads "Make Smokey's Birthday Wish Come True".

In 2004, Smokey's 60th anniversary was celebrated in several ways, including a Senate resolution designating August 9, 2004, as "Smokey Bear's 60th Anniversary", requesting that the President issue a proclamation "calling upon the people of the United States to observe the day with appropriate ceremonies and activities". According to Richard Earle, author of The Art of Cause Marketing, the Smokey Bear campaign is among the most powerful and enduring of all public service advertising:

"Smokey is simple, strong, straightforward. He's a denizen of those woods you're visiting, and he cares about preserving them. Anyone who grew up watching Bambi realizes how terrifying a forest fire can be. But Smokey wouldn't run away. Smokey's strong. He'll stay and fight the fire if necessary, but he'd rather have you douse it and cover it up so he doesn't have to."

In 2011, the campaign launched its first mobile application, or app, to provide critical information about wildfire prevention, including a step-by-step guide to safely building and extinguishing campfires, as well as a map of current wildfires across America.

In 2012, NASA, the U.S. Forest Service, the Texas Forest Service and Smokey Bear teamed up to celebrate Smokey's 68th birthday at NASA's Johnson Space Center in Houston. The popular mascot toured the center and recorded a promotional announcement for NASA Television. NASA astronaut Joe Acaba and the Expedition 31 crew chose a plush Smokey doll to be the team's launch mascot, celebrating their trip to the International Space Station. During his tour about 250 miles above Earth, Smokey turned 68 years old.

In 2014, the campaign celebrated Smokey's 70th birthday, with new birthday-themed television, radio, print, outdoor, and digital PSAs that continued the 2013 campaign "Smokey Bear Hug". The campaign depicted Smokey rewarding his followers with a hug, in acknowledgement of using the proper actions to prevent wildfires. In return, outdoor–loving individuals across the nation were shown reciprocating with a birthday bear hug in honor of his 70 years of service. Audiences were encouraged to join in by posting their own #SmokeyBearHug online. The campaign also did a partnership with Disney's Planes that same year. In 2016, the campaign launched a new series of PSAs that aimed to increase awareness about less commonly known ways that wildfires can start. The new "Rise from the Ashes" campaign featured art by Bill Fink, who used wildfire ashes as an artistic medium to illustrate the devastation caused by wildfires and highlight less obvious wildfire causes. In 2017, the campaign launched new videos and artwork inspired by Smokey Bear posters to continue to raise awareness of lesser-known wildfire starts. The new artwork was created by Brian Edward Miller, Evan Hecox, Janna Mattia, and Victoria Ying, portraying Smokey Bear in each of their unique styles.

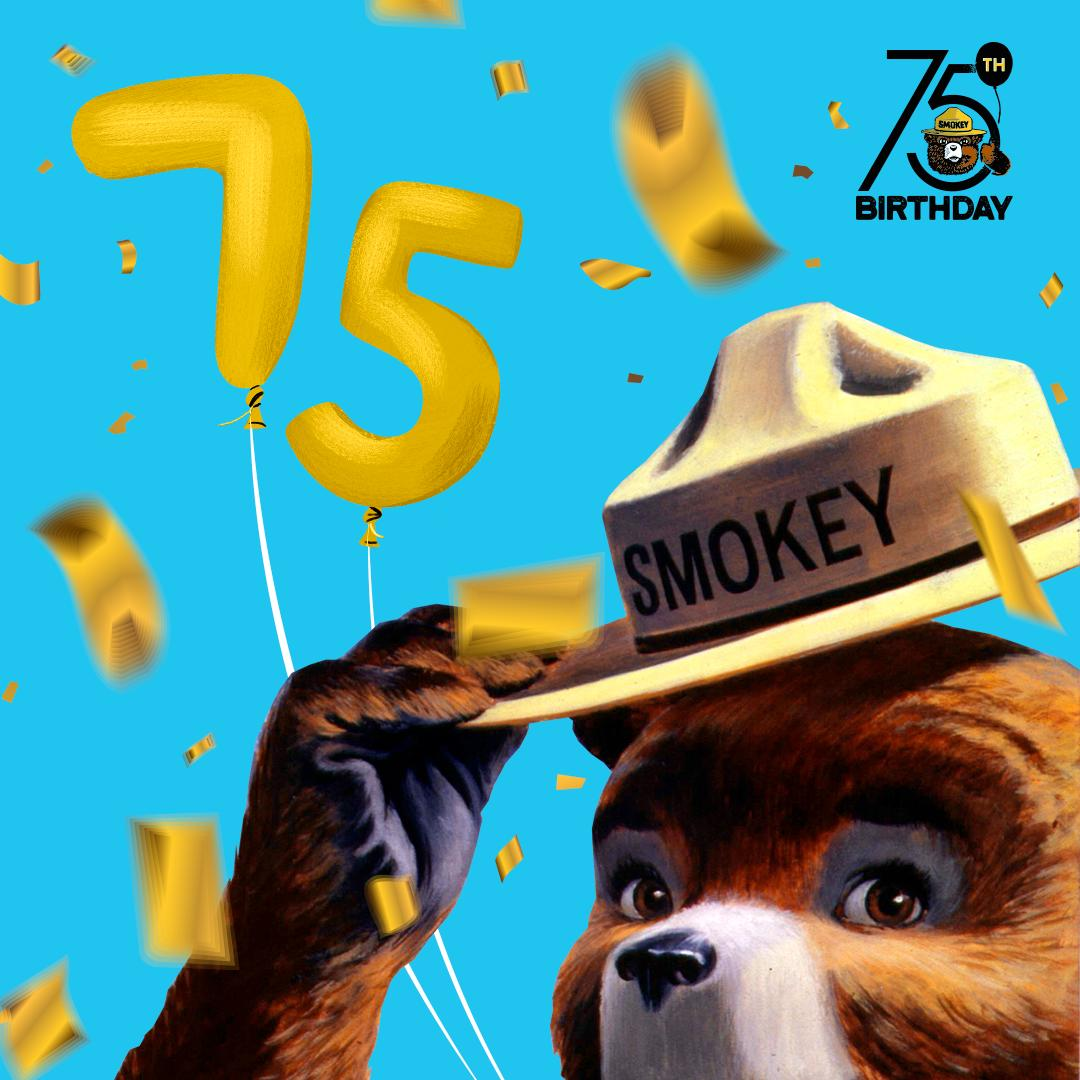
75th anniversary commemorative artwork from the Forest Service

For his 75th birthday in 2019, the Smithsonian's National Zoo in Washington D.C. opened an outdoor exhibit on May 23, 2019. Fourteen posters and multiple archival photographs of the original bear line the pathway in front of Smokey Bear's original habitat. At the entrance stands a 6-foot-tall statue of his cartoon persona. Along with the exhibit, new commercials and promotional materials were released, and events were held throughout the U.S. The NAL showcased movies, commercials, and paintings at their Beltsville location, materials were loaned to government agencies, and materials were provided to travel to various National Forests across the country throughout 2019.

On August 1, 2019, Oregon Department of Motor Vehicles released a Smokey Bear License Plate, just a few days before Smokey Bear's 75th birthday. The plate was sponsored by Keep Oregon Green, and costs an extra $40 per registration period, $35 of which goes to Keep Oregon Green.

Smokey Bear celebrated 80 years in 2024 with special events across several Western U.S. states and one U.S. territory, including California, Guam, Kansas, Montana, New Mexico, Washington and Wyoming. At the 98th Macy's Thanksgiving Day Parade, two Forest Service employees traveled to New York City to represent the agency as rope handlers for the Smokey Bear balloon.

The Smokey Bear public service announcement campaign, which the Ad Council has stewarded since 1944, marked its 80th anniversary in 2024 and remains the longest continuously running public service advertising campaign in U.S. history.

== Commercialization and cultural impact ==
Use of the Smokey Bear symbol in popular culture is often unauthorized. Clothing, accessories, and memorabilia depicting Smokey Bear are common in American fashion and culture. The chief of the Forest Service can authorize use of the Smokey Bear symbol for noncommercial educational purposes, and for "the commercial manufacture, importation, reproduction, or use of Smokey Bear upon the following findings: (1) That the use to which the article or published material involving Smokey Bear is to be put shall contribute to public information concerning the prevention of forest fires. (2) That the proposed use is consistent with the status of Smokey Bear as the symbol of forest fire prevention and does not in any way detract from such status. (3) That a use or royalty charge which is reasonably related to the commercial enterprise has been established. (c) Such other conditions shall be included as the Chief deems necessary in particular cases."

Some state police forces are nicknamed "Smokeys" and "bears" (particularly by truck drivers) because their patrolmen wear the same type of campaign hat that Smokey Bear does.

== Voice portrayal ==
Washington, D.C., radio station WMAL personality Jackson Weaver served as the primary voice representing Smokey until Weaver's death in October 1992. Dallas McKennon voiced Smokey in the 1957 Woody Woodpecker short film, Red Riding Hoodlum. George Walsh voiced Smokey in the 1960 animated short film, Smokey the Bear and the Little Boy. After Weaver's death, Gene Moss took over the role and voiced him until his death in 2002. In later years, Smokey has also been voiced by Roger C. Carmel (1969–1986), Jim Cummings (1993–2008), and Jack Angel (2002–2012). Frank Welker also briefly voiced Smokey in a few commercials. In June 2008, the Forest Service launched a new series of public service announcements voiced by actor Sam Elliott, simultaneously giving Smokey a new visual design intended to appeal to young adults. (coincidentally, Elliott was born on the very same day that Smokey was created). In celebration of Smokey's 75th birthday in 2019, public service announcements featuring emoji-based versions of the character were introduced, with the voices of Stephen Colbert, Jeff Foxworthy, and Al Roker. In 2024, in celebration of Smokey's 80th birthday, actor Brian Tyree Henry took over as the new voice.

== Adaptations ==
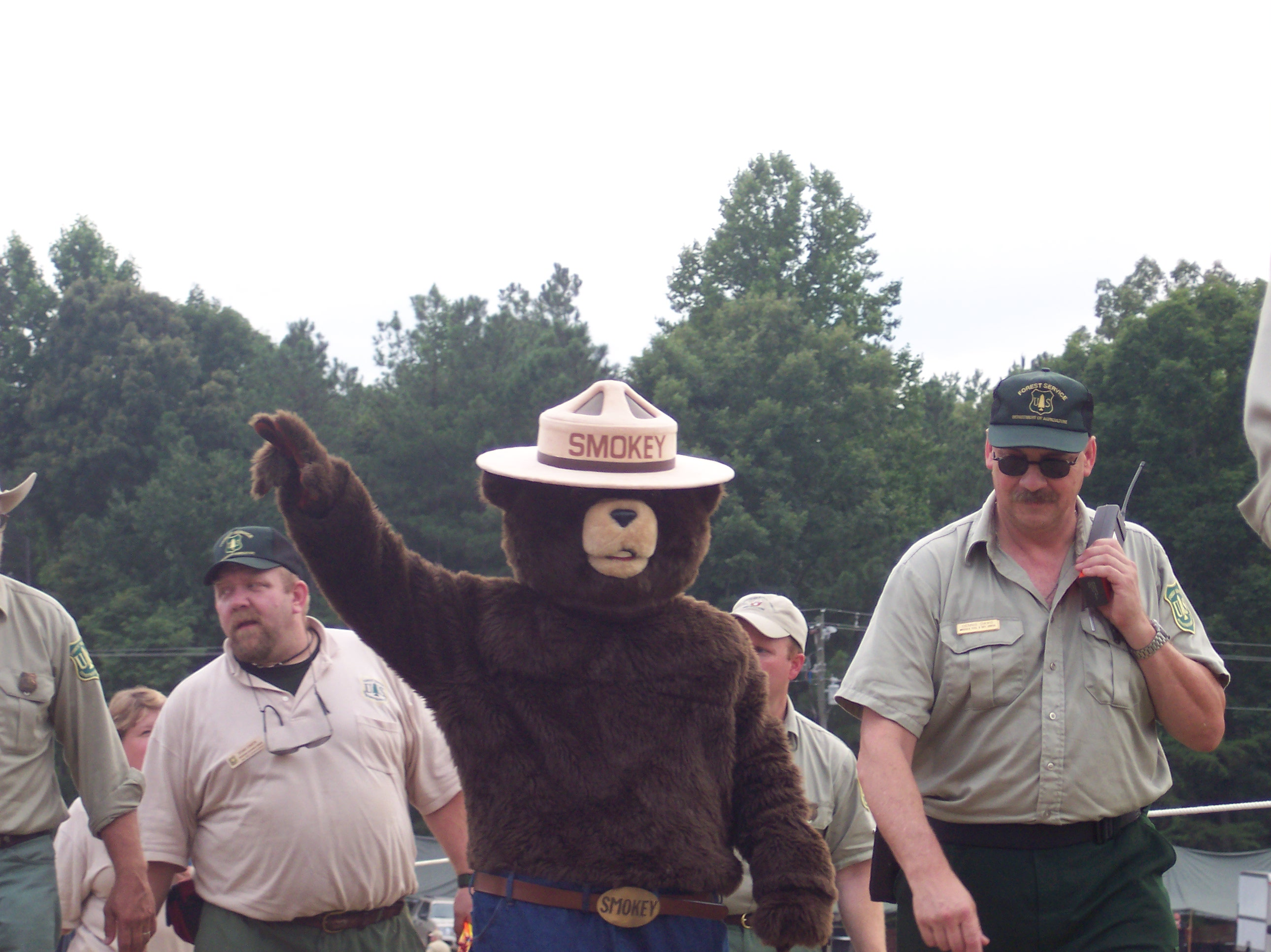
Smokey Bear at the 2005 National Scout Jamboree

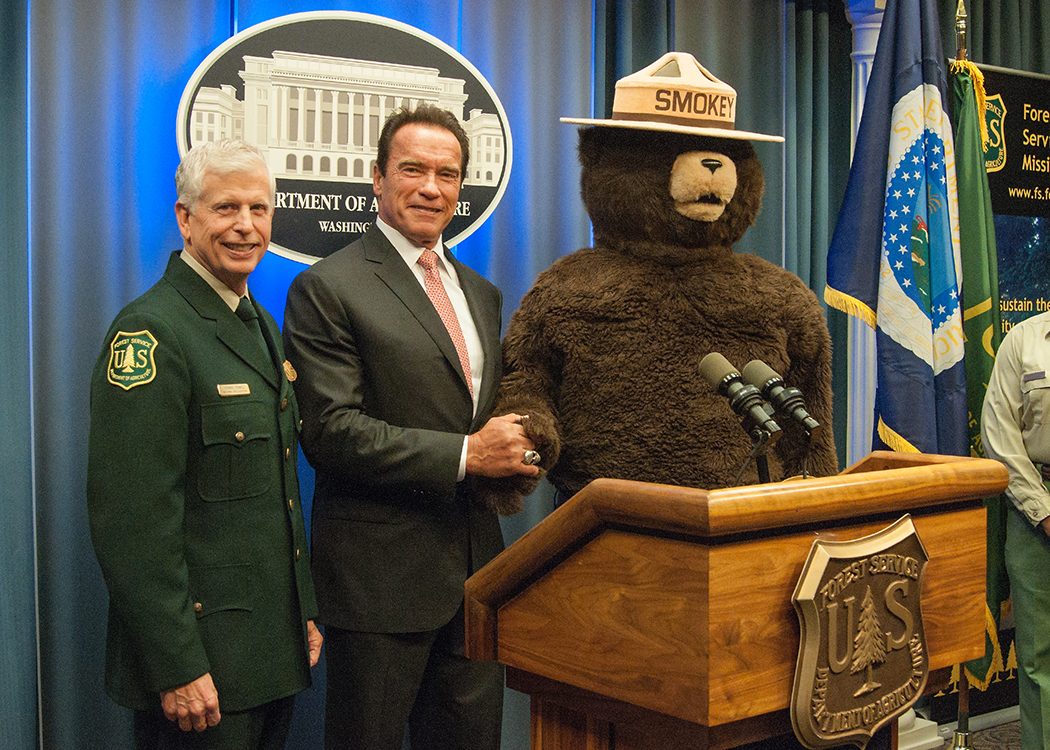
Smokey with Thomas Tidwell, Chief of the United States Forest Service, and Arnold Schwarzenegger

Smokey Bear—and parodies of the character—have been appearing in animation for more than fifty years. In 1956, Smokey made a cameo appearance in the Walt Disney short film In the Bag with a voice provided by Jackson Weaver. Rankin/Bass Productions, in cooperation with Tadahito Mochinaga's MOM Production in Japan, produced an "Animagic" stop-motion animated television special, Ballad of Smokey the Bear, narrated by James Cagney. It was broadcast on Thanksgiving Day, November 24, 1966, as part of the General Electric Fantasy Hour on NBC. The same day, a Smokey Bear balloon was featured in the Macy's Thanksgiving Day Parade, and it was advertised as "Thanksgiving is Smokey Bear Day on NBC TV".

During the 1969–1970 television season, Rankin/Bass also produced a weekly Saturday Morning cartoon series for ABC, called The Smokey Bear Show. This series was animated by Toei Animation in Japan.

Despite his real name being Smokey Bear, the name "Smokey the Bear" has been perpetuated in popular culture. Steve Nelson and Jack Rollins' song "Smokey the Bear" has been covered by the group Canned Heat, among others. The track is on their CD The Boogie House Tapes 1969–1999.

The online battle royale game Fortnite: Battle Royale parodies Smokey and his motto in a loading screen featuring Cuddle Team Leader, a woman dressed in a teddy bear costume replacing Smokey and doing his signature finger-pointing pose. Below her is the message "Only YOU can prevent V-Buck scams", warning players not to risk security compromises by attempting to obtain free virtual currency offered by hackers as bait.

== Slogan ==
Although the goal of reducing human-caused wildfires has never changed, the tagline of the Smokey Bear campaign was adjusted in the 2000s, from "Only you can prevent forest fires" to "Only you can prevent wildfires". The main reason was to accurately expand the category beyond just forests to include wildlands, which include grasslands. Another reason was to distinguish wildfires from fire ecology, in response to criticism from wildfire experts.

Decades of fire suppression and lack of indigenous fire ecology can contribute to dense forests with a lot of understory "fuel" and many dead standing trees. When a forest fire eventually does occur, the increased fuel creates a crown fire, which destroys all vegetation and affects surface soil chemistry. Although such fires have been occurring sporadically for 100 million years, and are part of the natural ecological rhythm of forests, frequent and small "natural" ground fires do prevent the accumulation of fuel and allow large, slow-growing vegetation, e.g., trees, to survive.

Periodic low-intensity wildfires are also an integral component of certain ecosystems that evolved to take advantage of natural fires, such as Douglas fir, chaparral and closed-cone conifer forest habitats, which need fire for cones to open and seeds to sprout, and germinate and grow better in open burn sites. Wildfires also play a role in the preservation of pine barrens, which are well adapted to small ground fires and rely on periodic fires to remove competing species.

SmokeyBear.com's current site has a section on "Benefits of Fire" that includes this information: "Fire managers can reintroduce fire into fire-dependent ecosystems with prescribed fire. Under specific, controlled conditions, the beneficial effects of natural fire can be recreated, fuel buildup can be reduced, and we can prevent the catastrophic losses of uncontrolled, unwanted wildfire." Prescribed or controlled fire is an important resource management tool. It is a way to efficiently and safely provide for fire's natural role in the ecosystem. However, the goal of Smokey Bear will always be to reduce the number of human-caused wildfires and reduce the loss of resources, homes and lives.

== See also ==
- Johnny Horizon
- Mark Trail
- Smokey the Bear Sutra
- Woodsy Owl
