= WMAL-FM =

Talk radio station in Woodbridge, Virginia, United States, serving Washington, D.C.

- Woodbridge, Virginia; United States
- Broadcast area: Washington metropolitan area
- Frequency: 105.9 MHz (HD Radio)
- RDS: 105.9WMAL
- Branding: 105.9 FM WMAL

Programming
- Language: English
- Format: Conservative talk radio
- Subchannels: HD2: Simulcast of WSBN
- Affiliations: CBS News Radio; Fox News Radio; Westwood One; WJLA-TV

Ownership
- Owner: Cumulus Media; (Radio License Holdings LLC)
- Sister stations: WSBN

History
- First air date: December 25, 1958
- Former call signs: WBVA (1959–1960); WWCN (1960); WBVA (1960–1961); WXRA (1961–1980); WVKX (1980–1981); WPKX-FM (1981–1986); WCXR-FM (1986–1994); WJZW (1994–2009); WVRX (2009–2011)
- Call sign meaning: Martin A. Leese, founder of WMAL (630 AM), now WSBN

Technical information
- Facility ID: 70037
- Class: B
- ERP: Horizontal: 28,000 watts; Vertical: 25,000 watts
- HAAT: 198 meters (650 ft)
- Transmitter coordinates: 38°52′28.4″N 77°13′22.9″W

Links
- Webcast: Listen live (via TuneIn); Listen live (via Audacy); Listen live (via iHeartRadio)
- Website: www.wmal.com

WMAL-FM (105.9 MHz) – branded 105.9 FM WMAL – is a radio station licensed to Woodbridge, Virginia, serving the Washington, D.C. Metro area. WMAL-FM airs a conservative talk radio format and is owned and operated by Cumulus Media. The station's studios are located at 4400 Jenifer Street NW in Washington, two blocks from the city's border with Maryland, and the transmitter site is in Falls Church, Virginia, off Lee Highway. WMAL-FM is co-owned with sports radio station WSBN at 630 kHz; the WMAL call sign and talk format originated on that station, and the two stations simulcast from 2011 to 2019.

== Programming ==
Weekday mornings on WMAL-FM start with O'Connor & Company with Larry O'Connor. In late mornings, Chris Plante hosts a nationally syndicated show, based at WMAL-FM. The Vince Show hosted by Vince Coglianese is the station's midday proram. Twenty-year veteran of talk radio, Derek Hunter, hosts in afternoon drive time. The rest of the schedule features nationally-syndicated programs:The Mark Levin Show, John Batchelor, and Red Eye Radio with Gary McNamara and Eric Harley.

Weekends feature shows on money, health, real estate and gardening, many of which are paid brokered programming, along with repeats of weekday shows. Most weekday hours feature local news at the beginning of each hour. Fox News Radio is carried at the beginning of most hours during nights and weekends.

== History ==
=== Early years ===
Before the existing station was founded, an earlier station, called WHIP, broadcast on 105.9 FM in the Washington area. The station was on the air between 1948 and 1950, and licensed to Silver Spring, Maryland; therefore it is unrelated to the existing station, which is licensed to Woodbridge. The call sign WMAL-FM was also used in the Washington market on the 107.3 MHz facility, known as WLVW, from 1948 through 1977.

On December 25, 1958, the station that would become WMAL-FM first signed on as WBVA. After several callsign changes, this station became known as WXRA, and during most of its early history it ran a mix of country music and Southern gospel music daily from 6 a.m. until midnight. Beginning in September 1967, it simulcast with WPIK, a co-owned station on 730 AM. Although WXRA was run from the same Alexandria studios as WPIK, WXRA's city of license has always been Woodbridge.

=== Country music and classic rock (1967–1993) ===
On December 31, 1967, WXRA debuted a full-time country format in response to listener requests. The station was assigned the call sign WVKX on September 9, 1980, followed by WPKX-FM on December 9, 1981. It kept the country format but began calling itself "Kix 106". On January 27, 1986, the station changed its call sign to WCXR-FM and instituted its first classic rock format, known as "Classic Rock 105.9". The classic rock format, which was just beginning to take hold in 1986, was considered experimental and debuted to high interest and ratings before eventually falling to more normal levels. The simulcast with 730 AM, now known as WTNT, was broken off around this time.

In 1989, WCXR's owners, the Metropolitan Broadcasting Corporation, sold ten stations including WCXR to Group W. Just four years later, in mid-1993, Group W sold WCXR to Viacom. This fueled rumors of a format change. Viacom elected to keep the format but fired the station's entire air staff, with company officially taking control on November 1, 1993.

=== Smooth Jazz 105.9 (1994–2008) ===
A new smooth jazz format, called "Smooth Jazz 105.9", debuted on September 30, 1994. This was spurred on, at least in part, by the format changes of WLTT (now WIAD) to classic rock and of WJZE (now WBIG-FM) to oldies. The call letters became WJZW on October 17.

In February 1997, Viacom sold 10 stations, including WJZW, to Chancellor Broadcasting. To comply with FCC limits on the number of radio stations that can be owned by one company, Chancellor sold WJZW on April 14, 1997, to ABC Radio, which was part of the Walt Disney Company. Citadel Broadcasting bought ABC Radio from Disney in 2007.

=== True Oldies 105.9 (2008–2009) ===
At 3:00 p.m. on February 29, 2008, after a brief statement was read thanking the staff and listeners of "Smooth Jazz 105.9", Citadel Broadcasting changed the format of WJZW to oldies. All on-air employees were fired as a part of the format shift. The first song on the new format was "Respect" by Aretha Franklin. Initially, no local live on-air talent was utilized, with the station instead relying on a satellite delivered service, Scott Shannon's The True Oldies Channel. Imus in the Morning was added as the new morning show after his move to Citadel's WABC.

=== 105.9 The Edge (2009–2011) ===
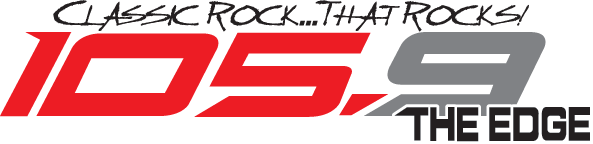
105.9 The Edge logo used from 2009–2011

On August 26, 2009, at 10 a.m., WJZW reverted its format back to classic rock, this time as "105.9 The Edge". The last song played on "True Oldies" was "Windy" by The Association, while the first song on "The Edge" was "Livin' on the Edge" by Aerosmith. The format shift made 105.9 as the DC market's only classic rock station, though WBIG-FM broadcast a lighter "classic hits" format. On September 17, 2009, the station changed its call letters to WVRX. On July 7, 2010, WVRX added a local morning drive program with Washington/Baltimore radio veterans Kirk McEwen and Mike O'Meara called Kirk and Mike.

=== WMAL-FM (since 2011) ===
Citadel merged with Cumulus Media on September 16, 2011. Three days later, on September 19, 2011, at noon, the station flipped to a simulcast of co-owned talk station WMAL. With a media market as concerned with news and politics as Washington, management believed the AM station's news/talk format would be strengthened by simulcasting on the powerful FM signal of 105.9. Additionally, simulcasting on FM filled in a significant gap in the AM station's nighttime coverage; WMAL must power down to 2,700 watts at sundown. The last songs on "105.9 The Edge" were "The Song Is Over" by the Who and "Hello, Goodbye" by the Beatles. The station filed a request to change its call sign to WMAL-FM, which became official on September 26, 2011.

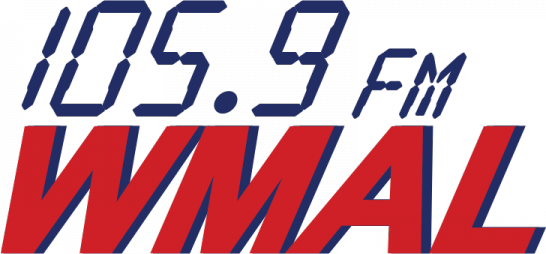
Former logo

On June 13, 2019, it was announced that WMAL would switch to ESPN Radio on July 1, 2019, leaving the news/talk format exclusive to WMAL-FM.

In April 2020, WMAL took the #1 spot in the ratings for the first time since the fall of 1986, beating competitors WAMU and WTOP-FM, while achieving a 10% audience share. The figure counts WMAL's history on 630 AM, then its transfer to FM, not the ratings on 105.9 FM at the time.
