= Willy McBean and His Magic Machine =

1965 film by Arthur Rankin, Jr.

- Official release poster
- Directed by: Arthur Rankin, Jr. Kizo Nagashima
- Written by: Arthur Rankin, Jr. Anthony Peters (continuity design)
- Produced by: Arthur Rankin, Jr.
- Starring: Larry D. Mann; Billie Mae Richards; Alfie Scopp; Paul Kligman; Claude Rae; Corinne Conley; James Doohan; Peggi Loder; Paul Soles
- Cinematography: Tadahito Mochinaga
- Music by: Edward Thomas
- Production companies: Videocraft International; Dentsu Motion Pictures; Animation: MOM Productions
- Distributed by: Magna Pictures Distribution Corporation
- Release date: June 23, 1965 (U.S.)
- Running time: 94 minutes
- Countries: United States; Canada; Japan
- Language: English

Willy McBean and His Magic Machine is a 1965 stop motion animated time travel musical film produced by Arthur Rankin, Jr. and Jules Bass' Videocraft International (now Rankin/Bass Productions) in the United States and Dentsu Motion Pictures in Japan. It was presented by Marshall Naify and released by Magna Pictures Distribution Corporation on June 23, 1965.

The film tells the story of Willy McBean, a young schoolboy who teams up with an anthropomorphic monkey named Pablo to prevent the villainous professor Rasputin Von Rotten from changing the history of the world, using the newly created and duplicated "magic" time machine.

Written, produced and directed by Arthur Rankin, Jr., with Jules Bass and Larry Roemer as associate producers, the film uses a team of voice actors under the soundtrack recording supervision of Bernard Cowan in Canada, including Larry D. Mann as Von Rotten, Billie Mae Richards as Willy And Alfie Scopp as Pablo the Monkey. Tadahito Mochinaga supervises the "Animagic" stop motion process at MOM Productions in Japan, the same team behind the animation for The New Adventures of Pinocchio (1960–61) and Rudolph the Red-Nosed Reindeer (1964).

== Plot ==
Willy McBean is sick of trying to learn history for school. Meanwhile, an evil scientist called Rasputin Von Rotten is building a magical time machine so he can go back in time and be the most famous person in history. A Spanish-English talking monkey named Pablo climbs through Willy's window. He explains that he escaped from Von Rotten and he tells Willy what he is planning to do. Pablo stole the plans to the time machine.

Willy builds his own machine to go back in time to stop Von Rotten. The machine isn't working properly. They end up with General George Armstrong Custer, and escape moments before Custer is killed in the Battle of the Little Bighorn (1876).

They then arrive in the Wild West, where they meet Buffalo Bill Cody and his Indian pal, Sitting Bull. Von Rotten plans to become the fastest gun in the west. Von Rotten asks Bill for a showdown, but both guns are sabotaged before anyone can be shot.

Von Rotten moves onto his next target, Christopher Columbus. Once there, disguised as a Chinese trader, he convinces Columbus's crew that they should mutiny. Once more McBean and Pablo stop the evil professor by showing the crew that land is not far off.

After that, Von Rotten goes back to England in the days of King Arthur in the kingdom of Camelot, but Pablo and Willy get Arthur to pull Excalibur the magic sword that can talk. A talking green dragon then crashes into Camelot in an effort to eat everyone, but King Arthur and Excalibur are able to drive him away.

After a quick diversion to the Roman Colosseum, Willy and Pablo later go to Ancient Egypt to stop Von Rotten from building the Great Pyramid. Then they go back to prehistoric times to encourage cavemen to discover fire and invent the wheel before Von Rotten.

After Von Rotten is saved from falling off a cliff by Willy (and having his time machine swallowed by a Tyrannosaurus rex), he turns over a new leaf and they help the cavemen build their first fire. As they return to the present, the reformed Von Rotten shows the students history through his magic machine (in the form of a movie projector) during history class.

== Voice cast ==
- Larry Mann as Professor Rasputin Von Rotten, Queen Isabella, Lion
- Billie Mae Richards as Willy McBean
- Alfie Scopp as Pablo the Monkey, The Dragon
- Paul Kligman as Christopher Columbus, Sitting Bull, Mr. Columbo
- Bunny Cowan as King Tut, Zuglug, Tiger
- Claude Rae as Buffalo Bill Cody, King Arthur, Sailor 2, Palace Guard, Mr. West
- Corinne Conley as Queen Ankhesenamun, Cavewoman
- James Doohan as General Custer, Merlin, Excalibur, Royal Emcee, Leopard
- Peggi Loder as Morgan le Fay, Willy's Mother
- Paul Soles as King Ferdinand, Suglug, Sailor 1, History Teacher, Officer Stone

^{Source:}

== Production credits ==
- Written, Produced, Directed by Arthur Rankin, Jr.
- Associate Producers: Jules Bass, Larry Roemer
- Associate Director: Kizo Nagashima
- Soundtrack Supervision: Bernard Cowan
- Music Supervision by Forrell, Thomas and Polack, Associates, Inc.
- Music by Edward Thomas
- Songs by Jim Polack, Edward Thomas, Gene Forrell
- Animation Supervision: Tadahito Mochinaga (credited as Tad Mochinaga)
- Puppet Makers: Ichiro Komuro, Kyoko Kita, Reiko Yamagata, Sumiko Hosaka (all uncredited)
- Animation: Tadahito Mochinaga, Hiroshi Tabata, Takeo Nakamura, Fumiko Magari, Tadanari Okamoto, Koichi Oikawa (all uncredited)
- Choreography: Edward Brinkmann
- Continuity Design: Anthony Peters (credited as Antony Peters)
- Additional Dialogue: Len Korobkin
- a Videocraft/Dentsu picture
- a Marshall Naify/Magna Pictures Distribution Corporation presentation

© 1965 Videocraft International, Limited and Dentsu Motion Picture Corporation.

== Songs ==
No.	Title	Performer(s)	Length
1.	"The Magical Magic Machine"	Chorus
2.	"Professor Rasputin Von Rotten"	Larry D. Mann
3.	"We Got Showbiz"	Alfie Scopp & Paul Kligman
4.	"Gotta Go West to Get East"	Paul Kligman
5.	"I Am for Hire"	Larry D. Mann
6.	"We're Knights of the Round Table (Not of the Square)"	Chorus
7.	"I'm the Most Exciting, Horrible Dragon (In All of Camelot)"	Alfie Scopp
8.	"Poorest Queen"	Bunny Cowan & Corinne Conley
9.	"A Caveman's Lot"	Bunny Cowan & Paul Soles
10.	"The Magical Magic Machine"	Chorus

== See also ==
- List of American films of 1965
