= Alfie Scopp =

Canadian actor (1919–2021)

- Born: Alfred Scopp; 15 September 1919; London, England
- Died: 24 July 2021 (aged 101); Toronto, Ontario, Canada
- Education: Lorne Greene Academy of Radio Arts
- Occupation: Actor

Alfred Scopp (15 September 1919 – 24 July 2021) was a Canadian actor who worked mostly in television series, including as a voice actor. He also worked in theatre, radio, and films. He was part of the voice cast for the 1964 Christmas special Rudolph the Red-Nosed Reindeer. Scopp was one of the longest-lived cast members of the special.

== Life and career ==
Scopp was born on 15 September 1919 in London, England, to a Russian-Jewish father and an English mother. As a child, he and his family emigrated to Montreal, Canada. During World War II, he was part of the Royal Canadian Air Force in Newfoundland. It was during this time that he began a career in radio, working for the local station CBG (AM). In theatre, he worked in different Toronto productions, as well as working for National Film Board of Canada. He attended Lorne Greene Academy of Radio Arts after the war, along with Leslie Nielsen, Gordie Tapp and Fred Davis.

He provided the voice of Socrates the Strawman in the 1960s animated television series Tales of the Wizard of Oz (1961) as well as the TV film Return to Oz (1964). He played the character role of bookseller Avram in the 1971 film Fiddler on the Roof, which won three Academy Awards and was nominated in seven more categories in 1972.

Scopp died in Toronto on 24 July 2021, at the age of 101.

== Filmography ==
=== Film ===
Year	Title	Role	Notes
1961	One Plus One		(segment "Homecoming")
1961	The Mask		
1965	Willy McBean and His Magic Machine	Pablo the Monkey / Dragon	Voice
1971	Fiddler on the Roof	Avram	
1972	The Sloane Affair	Berdan	
1983	Doctor Yes: The Hyannis Affair	Detective Carlson	
1986	Hot Money	David Townsend	
1986	Overnight	Gerald Ecker	

=== Television ===
Year	Title	Role	Notes
1952–1961	General Motors Theatre	Various	10 episodes
1954	Playbill		Episode: "The Bespoke Overcoat"
1955	Scope		Episode: "Oh, Canada!"
1956	Howdy Doody	Clarabell	Episode: "Untitled"
1957–1958	On Camera	Jakle / Gerald	3 episodes
1958	Cannonball	Storey	Episode: "The Attack"
1959–1960	RCMP	Steve Burnett / Sten Turner / Icky Williams	3 episodes
1960	Just Mary	Tony	Episode: "The Nicest Place in the World"
1960	First Person	Jimmy / Orrie Watts	2 episodes
1961	Tales of the Wizard of Oz	Socrates the Scarecrow	Voice, 68 episodes
1963	Scarlett Hill	Sam	Episode: "Twice Wedded, Twice Blessed"
1963–1964	Playdate	George / Wolfie	2 episodes
1964	Return to Oz	Socrates the Scarecrow	Voice, TV movie
1964	Time of Your Life		Episode: "The Boy King"
1964	Rudolph the Red-Nosed Reindeer	Charlie-In-The-Box / Fireball / Other Reindeer	Voice, TV movie
1964–1966	The Wayne and Shuster Hour		2 episodes
1966–1969	The King Kong Show		8 episodes
1967–1968	Spider-Man	Various	4 episodes
1969	Festival	Gregory	Episode: "The Journey of the Fifth Horse"
1969–1972	The Wayne and Shuster Comedy Special		5 episodes
1972–1973	Festival of Family Classics		Voice, 3 episodes
1977	Maria		TV movie
1980–1984	The Littlest Hobo	Oakie	4 episodes
1981	The July Group		TV movie
1982	Seeing Things	Rabbi	Episode: "An Eye for an Eye"
1985	Evergreen	Mr. Lerner	Episode 1.1
1985	The Undergrads	Hobo	TV movie
1986	The Edison Twins	Alfred Berksteen	Episode: "Invitation to a Mystery"
1988	Street Legal	Leo Gold	Episode: "Equal Partners"
