= Festival of Family Classics =

Animated TV series (1972–73)

- Official logo
- Directed by: Arthur Rankin Jr. Jules Bass
- Composer: Maury Laws
- Countries of origin: United States; Canada; Japan
- No. of seasons: 1
- No. of episodes: 20

Production
- Producers: Arthur Rankin Jr. Jules Bass
- Production companies: Rankin/Bass Productions; Mushi Production; Topcraft Limited Company (eps. 4-5, 19)

Original release
- Network: Syndication
- Release: September 10, 1972 – March 4, 1973

Festival of Family Classics is a Rankin/Bass animated anthology series that originally aired between 1972 and 1973. The show originally aired in syndication. It was re-aired 1 November 2005 on the Boomerang channel and on 16 June 2011 via the Teletoon Retro network.

Festival of Family Classics is a series of television versions of famous folk tales and classic literature. 16 of the 18 episodes were 20 minutes long. The two 40 minutes-long episodes ("20,000 Leagues Under the Sea" and "Around the World in 80 Days") were split into two-parters, making 20 episodes in total. The episodes were animated by two Japanese animation studios: Mushi Production and Topcraft Limited Company.

Videos have been distributed by several companies, including Prism Entertainment, Starmaker Video, EBM Group, and DreamWorks Classics. 12 episodes (including the two-parters as single episodes) have been released on DVD.

A similar series, Famous Classic Tales, aired on CBS from 1970 to 1984.

== List of episodes ==
Characters from the opening title sequence of the series.

No.	Title	Adapted by	Air date
1	Yankee Doodle	Fred Halliday	September 10, 1972
2	Cinderella	William J. Keenan	September 17, 1972
3	The Song of Hiawatha	William J. Keenan	September 24, 1972
4	20,000 Leagues Under the Sea - Part 1	Richard Neubert	October 1, 1972
5	20,000 Leagues Under the Sea - Part 2	Richard Neubert	October 8, 1972
6	Jack O'Lantern	William J. Keenan	October 29, 1972
7	Johnny Appleseed	Bob Littell	November 5, 1972
8	Around the World in 80 Days - Part 1	Leonard Starr	November 12, 1972
9	Around the World in 80 Days - Part 2	Leonard Starr	November 19, 1972
10	Robin Hood	William Overgard	November 26, 1972
11	Puss in Boots	Sandy Glass	December 9, 1972
12	A Christmas Tree	Ken Donnelly	December 17, 1972
13	The American Legend: Paul Bunyan	William J. Keenan	January 7, 1973
14	Swiss Family Robinson	William Overgard	January 13, 1973
15	The Sleeping Beauty	Ken Donnelly	January 21, 1973
16	The Arabian Nights	Fred Halliday	February 4, 1973
17	Alice in Wonderland	Sandy Glass	February 11, 1973
18	Robinson Crusoe	William Overgard	February 18, 1973
19	Tom Sawyer	Bob Littell	February 25, 1973
20	Snow White and the Seven Dwarfs	Stu Hample	March 4, 1973

== Voices ==
- Carl Banas
- Len Birman
- Bernard Cowan
- Peg Dixon
- Keith Hampshire
- Peggi Loder
- Donna Miller
- Frank Perry
- Henry Raymer
- Billie Mae Richards - Tom Sawyer, Peter, Danny
- Alfie Scopp
- Paul Soles

== Home media ==
On VHS:

- Alice in Wonderland (Starmaker Entertainment (1989, US), Futurevision Ltd. (1986, UK), Prism Entertainment (1986, US))
- Sleeping Beauty (Starmaker Entertainment (1989, US)
- Snövit och De Sju Dvärgarna (Snow White and the Seven Dwarfs) (SWE-Ayamonte AB)
- Tom Sawyer (SWE-Ayamonte AB - 1995)

Classic Media released 10 episodes on 4 DVDs in between 2006–2007.

- The Princess Collection (Snow White and the Seven Dwarfs, Cinderella, The Sleeping Beauty, Alice in Wonderland)
- Classic Adventures Volume 1 (Around the World in 80 Days, 20,000 Leagues Under the Sea)
- Classic Adventures Volume 2 (The Arabian Nights, Robin Hood)
- Classic Adventures Volume 3 (Swiss Family Robinson, Robinson Crusoe)

The 2002 DVD release of Here Comes Peter Cottontail features the "Puss in Boots" episode, and the Mad Mad Mad Monsters DVD includes the "Jack O' Lantern" episode.
