= Tales of the Wizard of Oz =

- Official logo
- Genre: Animation
- Based on: The Wonderful Wizard of Oz by L. Frank Baum
- Directed by: Harry Kerwin
- Voices of: Carl Banas; Corinne Conley; Bernard Cowan; Paul Kligman; Alfie Scopp
- Countries of origin: Canada; United States
- Original language: English
- No. of seasons: 1
- No. of episodes: 114

Production
- Producers: Arthur Rankin Jr. Jules Bass; Larry Roemer; Antony Peters; Bernard Cowan
- Running time: 5 minutes
- Production companies: Crawley Films; Videocraft Productions

Original release
- Network: Syndicated
- Release: September 1, 1961 – December 1961

Tales of the Wizard of Oz is a 1961 animated television series produced by Crawley Films for Videocraft (later known as Rankin/Bass Productions). This is the second animated series produced by the studio and the first by Rankin/Bass to feature traditional animation.

== Summary ==
The series features stories derived from characters created in L. Frank Baum's 1900 novel The Wonderful Wizard of Oz. Several characters are given additional names, including Dandy the Cowardly Lion, Rusty the Tin Man, and Socrates the Strawman. In this adaptation, rather than being dropped by a tornado, Dorothy and Toto are blown in from Kansas through a hole cut out of the landscape.

Each episode is a brief vignette about an adventure that the characters are involved in, often revolving around the Wizard's attempts to fulfil the characters' wishes.

Artistic renditions of the Oz characters created for this series were later featured in the hourlong television special Return to Oz. The series was also adapted to a comic book for a one-shot issue in Dell's Four Color #1308 (March–May 1962).

As of 2025, this series has yet to be released officially on DVD.

== Cast ==
- Carl Banas as The Wizard
- Corinne Conley as Dorothy
- Bernard Cowan as Munchkins, Various
- Stan Francis as Various
- Paul Kligman as Dandy Lion, Ham
- Peggi Loder as Various
- Larry D. Mann as Rusty the Tin Man, the Wicked Witch, Topsy Turvy, Desmond the Dragon
- Alfie Scopp as Socrates the Strawman, Baker, Robby the Rubber Man

== Episode list ==
1. Pilot: Part 1
2. Pilot: Part Two - The Witch Switch
3. Leapin' Lion
4. The Magic Hat
5. The Balloon Buzz
6. Machine-Gun Morris
7. Movie Maid
8. Shadow Shakes
9. The Big Cake Bake
10. Desmond's Dilemma
11. Misfire Miss
12. Gung-Ho Gang
13. Heart Burn
14. Stuffed
15. The Fountain of Youth
16. The Rubber Man
17. The Happy Forest
18. Dandy's Dilemma
19. The Search
20. The Bag of Wind
21. The Music Men
22. To Bee or Not to Bee
23. Have Your Pie and Eat It Too
24. The Sound of Munchkins
25. The Count
26. Places, Please
27. The Green Golfer
28. The Flying Carpet
29. The Monkey Convention
30. The Big Shot
31. On the Wing
32. To Stretch A Point
33. The Flipped Lid
34. Down in the Mouth
35. The Gusher
36. The Family Tree
37. Boomer Rang
38. The Great Laurso
39. The Pudgy Lion
40. Beauty and the Beach
41. The Hillies and the Billies
42. The School Marm
43. An Optical Delusion
44. Watch the Bouncing Bull
45. All in a Lather
46. The Green Thumb
47. Leap Frog
48. The Cultured Lion
49. Chowy Mein
50. The Super-Duper Market
51. Friends of a Feather
52. Monkey Air Lift
53. Guaranteed for Life
54. The Skills of Bravery
55. The Coat of Arms
56. Roar, Lion, Roar
57. Be a Card
58. The Inferior Decorator
59. The Salesman
60. The Cat's Meow
61. The Yellow Brick Road
62. Rusty Rusty
63. The Scarecrow
64. The Invisible Man
65. Free Trade
66. The Bull Fighter
67. The Golden Touch
68. The Long Hair
69. Roll the Presses
70. The Big Brother
71. The Cool Lion
72. Gabe the Gobbler
73. The Raffle
74. The Strawman Twist
75. The Dinner Party
76. The Fire Chief
77. The Green Tomato
78. The Poet
79. The Three Musketeers
80. One Big Headache
81. Get Out the Vote
82. The Wizard's Promise
83. Well Done
84. The Do-It-Yourself Heart
85. The Great Oz Auto Race
86. The Jail Breakers
87. The Reunion
88. The Sucker
89. The Bubble Champ
90. Too Much Heart
91. The Witch's Boyfriend
92. The Clock Watchers
93. Double Trouble
94. The O.N.
95. Going to Pieces
96. Mail-Order Lover
97. Love Sick
98. It's a Dog's Life
99. The Fallen Star
100. Don't Pick the Daisies
101. The Munchkin Robin Hood
102. The Wizard's Tail-Fins
103. The Rubber Doll
104. The Magic World Of Oz
105. The Wisdom Teeth
106. The Brain
107. Bake Your Cake and Eat it Too
108. A Fish Tale
109. The Last Straw
110. Plug-In Courage
111. The Wizard's Magic Wand
112. The Mail Man
113. The Pony Express
114. TV Romance

Film: Return to Oz (Feb 9, 1964)

== See also ==
- F. R. Crawley
- Rankin/Bass
- Adaptations of The Wizard of Oz — other adaptations of The Wonderful Wizard of Oz
