= Corinne Conley =

American actress (born 1929)

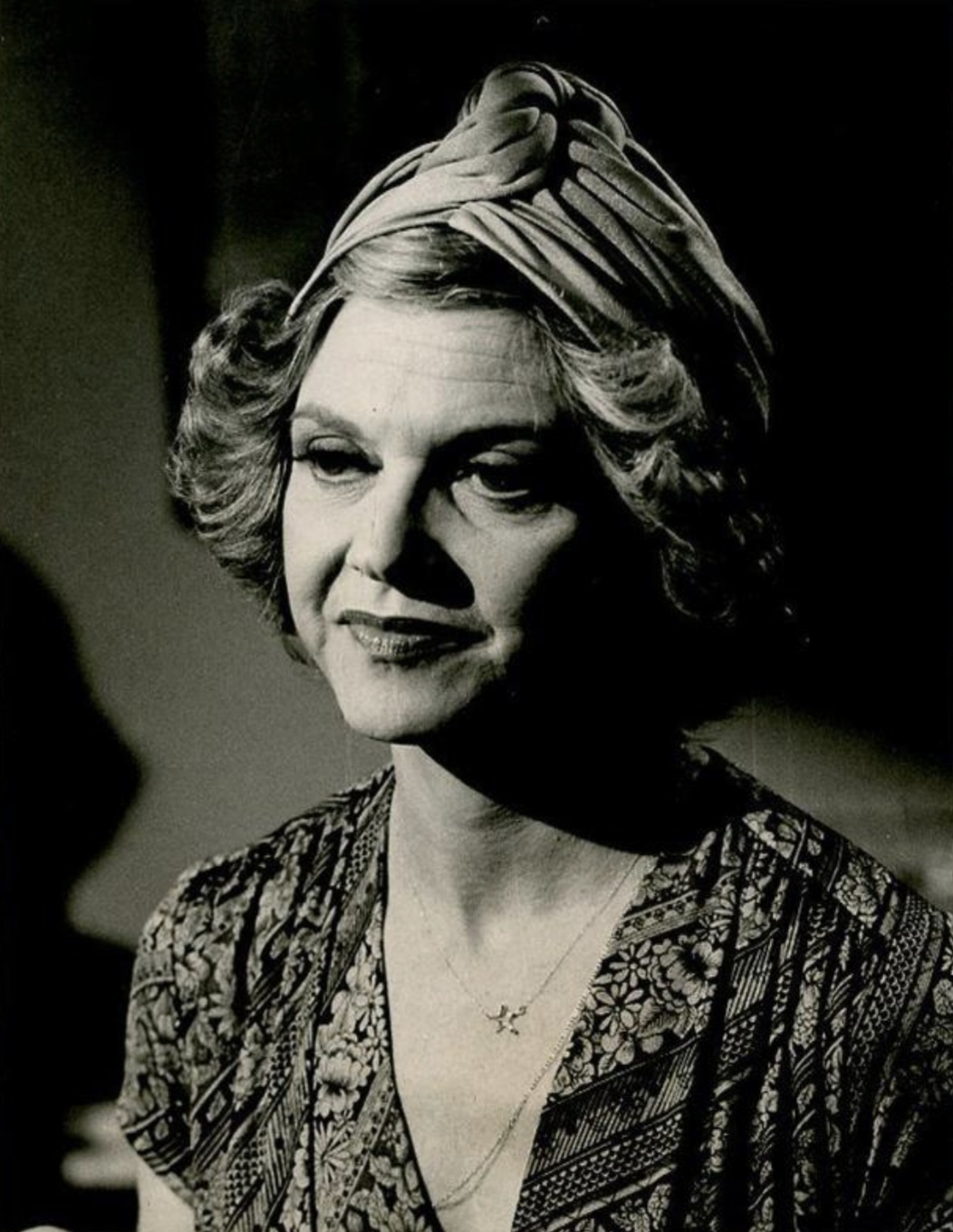
- Conley in 1979
- Born: Corinne Alexandra Conley; May 23, 1929 (age 97); New York, U.S.
- Education: University of Mary Washington
- Occupation: Actress
- Years active: 1953–2020
- Spouse: Bonar Stuart (m. 1950; died 2015)
- Children: 2

Corinne Alexandra Conley (born May 23, 1929) is an American actress who spent the majority of her career in Canada, where she won the Canadian Council of Authors and Artists' Best Actress Award. Conley is known for her voiceover work in various films and television productions, being most famously recognized for voicing Rudolph's mother and Dolly for Sue in the 1964 animated television special Rudolph the Red-Nosed Reindeer.

Conley's acting career spans more than seventy years, receiving several nominations for her work. She has also made prominent and notable appearances in Tales of the Wizard of Oz as Dorothy Gale, Days of Our Lives as Phyllis Anderson, the Goosebumps episode "Monster Blood" as Aunt Katherine, Quads! as Sister Butch, A Christmas Horror Story as Aunt Edda, and voicing multiple characters in the Watch Dogs: Legion video game.

== Acting career ==
For two years, Conley played the ingenue lead in The Common Glory, an outdoor drama in Williamsburg, Virginia.

For four years, Conley portrayed Phyllis Anderson on the NBC-TV daytime drama Days of Our Lives. She also provided the voice of Dolly for Sue and Rudolph’s mother in the 1964 animated NBC-TV special Rudolph the Red-Nosed Reindeer.

Conley was a winner of the Canadian radio talent competition Opportunity Knocks. Beginning in 1955, she was hostess of Open House, a daily program on CBC Television. She played the female lead in CBC-TV's adaptation of the soap opera Search for Tomorrow. Other Canadian TV programs on which she appeared included Playdate, G. M. Presents, and Portrait. She also was heard on Crime Quiz on CBC Radio, and she made commercials for radio and TV.

On Broadway, Conley portrayed Pearl Vambrance in Love and Libel (1960). Her other stage experience includes productions of the National Classic Theatre (NCT) in New York, which presented plays across the United States in colleges and high schools, and The Mountain Playhouse, Beaver Lake, and Vineland Summer Theatre, all in Canada. She also performed with the comedy duo Wayne and Shuster across Canada.

In an interview with Saturday Morning Rewind in 2013, Conley admitted to having no memory of voicing Dolly for Sue during the production of Rudolph the Red-Nosed Reindeer (1964), but remembers voicing Rudolph's mother. She told the interviewer that the possibility of voicing Dolly is likely, but has no memory of it. According to several movie databases and websites, Conley is credited as Dolly for Sue and additional voices.

In 2018, Conley defended the Rudolph the Red-Nosed Reindeer TV film against claims of bigotry and bullying.

Conley is the last surviving cast member of Rudolph the Red-Nosed Reindeer, following the deaths of long surviving co-stars Carl Banas in April 2020, Paul Soles in May 2021, and Alfie Scopp in July 2021.

== Personal life ==
Conley was born in New York and spent most of her youth in Radford, Virginia. After graduating from high school in Radford, she graduated from the University of Mary Washington in Virginia.

Conley married Bonar Stuart, whom she met when both worked with the NCT. They have two sons.

== Filmography ==
- Tit-Coq (1953) - Rosie
- Flight into Danger (1956) - Janet
- Rudolph the Red-Nosed Reindeer (1964) - Dolly for Sue, Rudolph's mother (voice)
- The Return of Count Yorga (1971) - Witch
- The Night God Screamed (1971) - Betty Coogan
- Check It Out! (1988) - Darla Fontaine, Episode: Educating Leslie
- Mark Twain and Me (1991) - Saleswoman
- Final Judgment (1991) - Dr. Monroe
- Search for Diana (1992) - Dr. Woodhouse
- Deadly Matrimony (1992) - Genevieve Capstaff
- Shattered Trust: The Shari Karney Story (1993) - Female Judge
- Butterbox Babies (1995) - Mrs. Chadaway
- Salt Water Moose (1996) - Grandma
- Cleveland Woods Last Day on Earth (short film, 1996)
- Her Desperate Choice (1996) - Jody's Mother
- The Care and Handling of Roses (1996) - Margaret
- The Defenders: Payback (1997) - Judge Turner
- Dead Husbands (1998) - Mrs. Catcher
- Custody of the Heart (2000) - Connie
- Franklin and the Green Knight: The Movie (2000) - Granny Turtle (voice)
- Guilty Hearts (2002) - Mae Moran
- RFK (2002) - Rose Kennedy
- Christmas Rush (2002) - Gramma Pat
- The Berenstain Bears (2002) - Grizzly Gran (voice)
- Big Spender (2003) - Rita
- Love Rules! (2004) - Grandma Betty
- Saving Emily (2004) - Grandma Wilton
- Heidi (2005) - Grannie (voice)
- Franklin and the Turtle Lake Treasure (2006) - Granny Turtle (voice)
- Legacy of Fear (2006) - Mimi Wickersham
- Shades of Black: The Conrad Black Story (2006) - Maud
- Nature of the Beast (2007) - Lucy Sullivan
- The Way It Used to Be (short film, 2009) - Rebecca
- Old Stock (2012) - Gloria
- Cas & Dylan (2013) - Rose
- WolfCop (2014) - Mayor Bradley
- A Christmas Horror Story (2015) - Aunt Edda
- A Simple Favor (2018) - Librarian
- Anne with an E (2019, 1 episode) - Mrs. Thomas
- Arthur (2020, 1 episode) - Older Woman
