= Tadahito =

- Gender: Male

Origin
- Origin: Japanese
- Meaning: Different meanings depending on the kanji used

Tadahito (written: 資仁 or 只仁) is a masculine Japanese given name. Notable people with the name include:

- Tadahito Iguchi (井口 資仁) (born 1974), Japanese baseball player
- Tadahito Mochinaga (持永 只仁) (1919–1999), Japanese animator
