= Billie Mae Richards =

Canadian actress (1921–2010)

- Born: Billie Mae Dinsmore; November 21, 1921; Toronto, Ontario, Canada
- Died: September 10, 2010 (aged 88); Burlington, Ontario, Canada
- Education: Lorne Greene Academy of Radio Arts
- Occupations: Actress; voice actress
- Years active: 1925–2001
- Spouse: Bill Richards (m. 1946; div. 1966)
- Children: 3 (including Judi)

Billie Mae Richards (née Dinsmore, November 21, 1921 – September 10, 2010) was a Canadian actress and voice actress who made numerous appearances onstage and on television. She was most famously the voice of Rankin/Bass' version of the Christmas character Rudolph the Red-Nosed Reindeer from 1964 to 1979. She also famously provided the voice of the titular character of the Kid in the radio series Jake and the Kid.

== Early life and education ==
Richards was born Billy Mae Dinsmore, in Toronto to parents Garnett and Eva May (Stanton) Dinsmore. Enrolled by her ambitious father in dancing lessons as a toddler, by the age of five she was in a stage show with WW1 veterans. She enlisted in the Royal Canadian Navy and performed in the show Meet the Navy that travelled across Canada and in Europe. She attended the Lorne Greene Academy of Radio Arts in Toronto.

== Career ==
Richards worked at the Canadian Broadcasting Corporation, speaking and singing in radio dramas. From 1950 to 1956, she was the voice of the Kid in the radio series Jake and the Kid.

As well has her portrayal of Rudolph, Richards also voiced Tenderheart Bear in the first two Care Bears movies, as well as the DIC-produced television series (credited as "Billie Mae Richard"), and Brightheart Raccoon in the Nelvana-produced Care Bears television series.

Richards' four other appearances in Rankin/Bass productions animated were in Willy McBean and his Magic Machine, The King Kong Show, The Smokey Bear Show and The Daydreamer (both from the mid-1960s) and Rudolph the Red-Nosed Reindeer and its sequels all written in the United States and animated in Japan. About that same time, she appeared in the original Spider-Man television series. She also voiced Chris and Robbie, plus all the female characters, in The Undersea Adventures of Captain Nemo and The Toothbrush Family with Len Carlson, who voiced all the male ones. Additionally, she voiced puppet characters in the Canadian produced TV shows We Live Next Door, and its spin-off, Calling All Safety Scouts. She made guest appearances on the television shows Maniac Mansion, My Secret Identity, War of the Worlds and The Hidden Room. She also had a bit part in the 1998 horror film Bram Stoker's Shadow Builder, in which her character was attacked with an axe by Paul Soles (who had played Hermey the elf in the original Rudolph special), and the 2001 short Bluehair.

== Personal life ==
Billie Mae Dinsmore married musician Bill Richards in 1946 in Yorkshire, England; they remained married until their divorce in 1966. Together they had four children: Stephen Richards, Judi Richards, a singer-songwriter, Barbara Jayne Richards and Cynthia "Cyndi" Richards-Jamieson. She also had 12 grandchildren and 9 great-grandchildren.

== Death ==
Richards died on September 10, 2010, following a stroke, at the age of 88.

== Filmography ==
=== Film ===
- Meet the Navy (1946) -
- Willy McBean and his Magic Machine (1965) - Willie McBean (voice)
- The Daydreamer (1966) - Various voices
- Jailbait Babysitter (1977)
- The Care Bears Movie (1985) - Tenderheart Bear, Mrs. Cherrywood (voices)
- Care Bears Movie II: A New Generation (1986) - Tenderheart Bear (voice)
- The Video Adventures of Clifford the Big Red Dog (1988) (Direct-to-Video Series) - Mrs. Gomez
- The Big Slice (1991) - Lady Overboard
- Shadow Builder (1998) - Mrs. Butterman
- Bluehair (2001) - Peg
- Care Bears: Forever Friends (2004) - Brightheart Raccoon (voice) (archival footage)

=== Television ===
- Rudolph, the Red-Nosed Reindeer (1964) (TV Special) - Rudolph (voice)
- Mr. Piper (1964) - Various
- The King Kong Show (1966) - Billy Bond (voice)
- Spider-Man (1967–1970) - Billy Conner, Boy, Additional voices
- The Smokey Bear Show (1969–1970) - Cub Smokey, Bessie the pig (voices)
- Festival of Family Classics (1973) - Tom Sawyer, Peter, Danny (voices)
- The Undersea Adventures of Captain Nemo (1974) - Chris, Robbie (voices)
- Rudolph's Shiny New Year (1976) (TV Special) - Rudolph (voice)
- The Toothbrush Family (1977–1983) - Narrator, Tess, Tina, Cecily Comb, Suzy Sponge (voices)
- Rudolph and Frosty's Christmas in July (1979) - Rudolph (voice)
- We Live Next Door (1981) - Joey, Mayor Morris, Additional voices
- Calling All Safety Scouts (1982) - Joey, Mayor Morris, Additional voices
- The Care Bears (1985–1988) - Tenderheart Bear, Matthew Miller, boy #2, Kara's mom, David's Mom, Mrs. Wayland (DIC version), Brightheart Raccoon, Tenderheart Bear (1 ep) (Nelvana version)
- War of the Worlds (1988) - Matron #1
- My Secret Identity (1989) - extra
- The Hidden Room (1991) - Nonnie
- Maniac Mansion (1992) - Aunt Winnie
- Rupert (1994) - Young Sea Serpent (voice)
- Melanie Darrow (1997) - Ma Harper
