= Return to Oz (disambiguation) =

Return to Oz may refer to:

- Return to Oz (TV special), 1964 animated television special
- Return to Oz, 1985 dark fantasy film
- "Return to Oz", 2004 song from the eponymous Scissor Sisters album
