= Spider-Man (1967 TV series) =

Superhero animated television series

- Genre: Superhero; Action; Adventure
- Based on: Spider-Man by: Stan Lee; Steve Ditko
- Voices of: Paul Soles; Paul Kligman; Peg Dixon
- Narrated by: Bernard Cowan
- Theme music composer: Paul Francis Webster; Bob Harris
- Opening theme: "Spider-Man"
- Ending theme: "Spider-Man"
- Composer: Ray Ellis
- Countries of origin: Canada; United States
- No. of seasons: 3
- No. of episodes: 52 (77 segments) (list of episodes)

Production
- Executive producers: Robert L. Lawrence (season 1); Ralph Bakshi (seasons 2–3)
- Producer: Ray Patterson (season 1)
- Running time: 25 minutes
- Production companies: Grantray-Lawrence Animation (season 1); Krantz Films (seasons 2–3); Marvel Comics Group

Original release
- Network: ABC (seasons 1–2); Syndication (season 3)
- Release: September 9, 1967 – June 14, 1970

Spider-Man is a superhero animated television series that was the first television series based on the Spider-Man comic book series created by writer Stan Lee and by artist Steve Ditko. The series aired Saturday mornings from September 9, 1967 to June 14, 1970. Season 1 was produced by Grantray-Lawrence Animation with Canadian voice actors, Paul Soles as Peter Parker and Paul Kligman as J. Jonah Jameson working from Toronto. Grantray-Lawrence went bankrupt, so their distributor Krantz Films took over production, with animator Ralph Bakshi flying back and forth between Toronto and New York City where Gray Morrow was working on the art. The first two seasons aired on the ABC television network, and the third was distributed in syndication.

The series gained a variety of internet memes and is also remembered for its theme song containing the iconic phrase "Spider-Man, Spider-Man, does whatever a spider can."

== Synopsis ==
The series revolved around teenager Peter Parker, a high school student who develops extraordinary strength and spider-like powers after being bitten by a radioactive spider. Parker decides to become a crime-fighting, costumed superhero, but must deal with family tragedies, personal problems and the insecurity of youth. As Spider-Man, Parker risks his life to fight super-powered criminals such as Doctor Octopus, Mysterio and the Green Goblin. Peter is also a freelance photographer for the Daily Bugle, but editor J. Jonah Jameson considers Spider-Man a criminal and writes front-page headlines critical of his activities.

The first season dealt primarily with Peter's job at the Daily Bugle, focusing on his relationship with Jameson, his romance with receptionist Betty Brant, and often being called into action as his alter ego. Peter's life, apart from the Bugle office and his Aunt May's Forest Hills home, was rarely dealt with in early episodes. Although he was never seen at college, he would sometimes visit professors he knew (such as the opening of "Sub-Zero for Spidey," when he went to see Doctor Smartyr). Peter's character (blue suit, yellow vest, white shirt and red tie) was designed by Steve Ditko and art consultant John Romita Sr.

Season one's stories mainly involved classic Spider-Man villains from the comic-book series, whose captures were often accompanied by a note signed by "your friendly neighborhood Spider-Man." Stan Lee was the story consultant for this season. Seasons two and three, produced by Ralph Bakshi, almost entirely eliminated villains from the comic book as a cost-cutting measure in favor of generic, green-skinned, magical monsters; this enabled the reuse of stock footage from Rocket Robin Hood, another animated series produced by Bakshi.

== Episodes ==
Season	Episodes	Originally released	
Season	Episodes	First released	Last released
1	20	September 9, 1967	January 20, 1968
2	19	September 14, 1968	January 18, 1969
3	13	March 22, 1970	June 14, 1970

== Cast ==
=== Regular (credited) voice providers ===
- Paul Soles – Peter Parker / Spider-Man, Ox, Fakir (in "The Fantastic Fakir"), Vulture (in "The Vulture's Prey"; "To Catch a Spider"; "The Winged Thing")
- Bernard Cowan – Narrator, Cowboy, Desperado (in "Blueprint for Crime"), Dr. Matto Magneto (in "The Revenge of Dr. Magneto"), Dr. Von Schlick (in "The Slippery Dr. Von Schlick"), Plutonian Leader (in "Sub-Zero for Spidey")
- Paul Kligman – J. Jonah Jameson, Fiddler/Otto (in "Fiddler on the Loose"), Hippie Poet (in "Blueprint for Crime"), Lee Patterson (in "The Spider and the Fly")
- Peg Dixon – Betty Brant, Martha Connors, May Parker, Mary Jane Watson

=== Semi-regular (uncredited) voice providers ===
- Carl Banas – Scorpion, Charles Cameo (in "Double Identity"), Dr. Manta (in "Phantom from the Depths of Time"), Kotep (in "The Evil Sorcerer")
- Len Carlson – Green Goblin, Captain Ned Stacy, Parafino (in "The Peril of Parafino"; "Night of the Villains"), Bolton (in "Thunder Rumble"), Stan Patterson (in "Trick or Treachery")
- Vern Chapman – Doctor Octopus (in "The Power of Dr. Octopus")
- Gillie Fenwick – Lizard Man/Dr. Curtis Conners, Vulture (in "The Sky is Falling"), Doctor Smartyr, Pardo (in "Pardo Presents"), Plotter (in "Blueprint for Crime")
- Max Ferguson – Fifth Avenue Phantom, The Executioner of Paris (in "Night of the Villains")
- Tom Harvey – Electro, Doctor Octopus (in "The Terrible Triumph of Doctor Octopus"), Farley Stillwell, Kingpin, Mugs Riley, Sandman (in "Sands of Crime"), Baron von Rantenraven (in "Sky Harbor"), Director (in "The Menace of Mysterio"), Dr. Atlantean (in "Up From Nowhere"), Master Vine (in "Vine"), Clive (in "Blotto")
- Jack Mather – Jesse James (in "Night of the Villains")
- Ed McNamara – Rhino, Blackbeard (in "Night of the Villains"), Vulcan (in "Here Comes Trubble")
- Frank Perry – Captain (in "Return of the Flying Dutchman"), James Boothe (in "Farewell Performance")
- Henry Ramer – Henry Smythe, Dr. Noah Boddy, Grandini the Mystic (in "The Witching Hour"), Lee Patterson (in "Trick or Treachery"), Mr. Flintridge (in "The Spider and the Fly")
- Claude Ray – Charles Cameo (in "The Sinister Prime Minister")
- Billie Mae Richards – Billy Connors
- Alfie Scopp – Jewelry Store Clerk (in "The Dark Terrors"), Stan Patterson (in "The Spider and the Fly")
- Chris Wiggins – Mysterio, Blackwell the Magician, Harley Clivendon, Boomer (in "Thunder Rumble"), Infinata (in "Revolt in the Fifth Dimension")
- Jim Willis – Cyrus Flintridge III

== Production ==
=== Budget ===
Because of the show's limited budget, Spider-Man's costume only has webbed areas on his head, arms and boots; the rest is plain, except for the spiders on his chest and back. The series relied on reused stock animation, including Spider-Man swinging across the New York City skyline and Peter removing his shirt to reveal his spider suit. Character movement was also minimized.

The second and third seasons were produced on a reduced budget by Krantz Films under Ralph Bakshi. The cost-cutting is most apparent in the third season, with two episodes reusing almost all the footage from two Rocket Robin Hood episodes (notably the season-three Rocket Robin Hood episode, "Dementia 5") and remaking previous episodes with minimal changes.

Several stories during this time were written by noted science fiction/fantasy author Lin Carter.

An error in Spider-Man's costume appeared throughout season one, with the spider on his costume having only six legs. By season two, new drawings of the costume showed an eight-legged spider, but reused footage from season one continued that season's error.

The second- and third-season episodes had a darker tone, with dark-colored settings, psychedelic images and atmospheric music. Bakshi explored Peter's everyday life as a soft-spoken college student, such as his failure to make the football team in "Criminals in the Clouds" and becoming a star pitcher for the baseball team in "Diamond Dust." He dated a variety of women who were either concealing secrets ("Home") or waited angrily for him while Spider-Man saved the city from destruction ("Swing City"). Peter's most consistent love interest was Susan Shaw, who first appeared in "Criminals in the Clouds" and continued to appear in season-two and -three episodes, even though her appearance changed from episode to episode. Bakshi provided the first origin story for Spider-Man presented on television, "The Origin of Spider-Man," which actually used chunks of Stan Lee's dialogue from The Spectacular Spider-Man #1 - specifically, "In the Beginning," published in July 1968, a few months before the episode aired.

=== Music ===
The show's theme song has been covered by many bands such as the Ramones, Aerosmith and Michael Buble. Its lyrics were written by Academy Award winner Paul Francis Webster, with music composed by Bob Harris. It was performed by the Billy Van Singers and Laurie Bower Singers.

The catchy song is recognized by its opening line, "Spider-Man, Spider-Man, does whatever a spider can."

The 2002 and 2004 film versions included Jayce Bartok and Elyse Dinh, respectively, busking the song. Both films have the song at the end of the credits; the 2002 adaptation featured the original 1967 recording (along with a re-recording by Aerosmith on the soundtrack), and 2004's Spider-Man 2 features a re-recording by Michael Bublé. 2007's Spider-Man 3 features a performance of the song by a marching band at a public rally for Spider-Man. In 2014's The Amazing Spider-Man 2, Peter uses a version of the theme as his ringtone. In 2017's Spider-Man: Homecoming, an orchestral version plays over the Marvel Studios title card sequence. In 2018's Spider-Man: Into the Spider-Verse, the theme is briefly played at the beginning, when the original Peter Parker says he "had an excellent theme song."

The original Spider-Man theme song recording was remixed by UK-based electronic music group Apollo 440 as the theme song for the 2000 Spider-Man video game by Activision and Neversoft Entertainment.

The show's incidental music uses jangling surf guitar, brass lines and jazzy scoring. The first season's score was original by Ray Ellis, with season two and three utilizing other music from the KPM, Capitol, Conroy and Josef Weinberger libraries by Syd Dale, Alan Hawkshaw, Johnny Hawksworth and David Lindup. In 2002, the Winnipeg jazz rock band Volume released a CD, The Amazing Spider-Band, adapting the background music. MIDI musician Vaughn Smith (Moxxi) has also released some adaptations to YouTube and elsewhere. In 2007, the radio station WFMU did a radio show featuring songs from the cartoon alongside the original masters from KPM, later released as a podcast.

== Broadcast schedule ==
Spider-Man was initially transmitted in the United States on Saturday mornings on ABC. The first episode, "The Power of Doctor Octopus" / "Sub-Zero for Spidey", premiered on September 9, 1967. During the first and second seasons, the show was broadcast at 10 a.m. Eastern Time. ABC's last Saturday-morning broadcast of Spider-Man was on August 30, 1969, with 39 half-hour episodes (many with two stories) aired. The show went on hiatus until the following March, when a third season began a six-month run from March 22 to September 6, 1970, on Sunday mornings at 11:30 a.m. Eastern. It was rerun in syndication in the United States during the 1970s, usually as part of local stations' after-school cartoon block. In Canada, the series aired on CTV Network affiliates on Saturday morning and other time slots during the 1970s and 1980s.

In Japan, the series was broadcast on TV Tokyo from July 23 to October 10, 1974. It was broadcast again from November 30, 1974, to March 29, 1975. Kei Tomiyama was in charge of the Japanese version voice actor. In June 1986 it was broadcast on TV Tokyo again and ended in November of the same year. The voice actor was changed to Hideyuki Tanaka. Changed to Toshiyuki Morikawa when broadcast on Sky PerfecTV! (Channel Unknown) around 2003.

In 1977, Spider-Man was broadcast abroad, airing in several international markets for the first time. The Spanish and Italian versions used a different theme song, written by Erick Bulling and Santiago and sung by Chilean singer Guillermo "Memo" Aguirre, dubbed over the original introduction. In the Italian version, the show's title (L'uomo Ragno) was superimposed in large yellow type over the first two shots of Spider-Man swinging through the city.

The series aired on Disney's ABC Family in 2002 as part of the network's Memorial Day weekend-long "Spidey-Mania" marathon, to coincide with the release of the first Spider-Man movie. It was not seen again until another "Spidey-Mania" marathon in 2004, coinciding with the release of Spider-Man 2, its last television appearance in the U.S.

In September 2008, the series appeared in Canada on Teletoon Retro. A French-language dub aired on Radio-Canada's Saturday-morning lineup into the mid-2000s. Episodes of the series have been posted in the "Videos" section of the Marvel website, but have since been removed.

== Distribution and rights ==
In July 1995, News Corporation and 20th Century Fox acquired the rights to the show and all of Marvel's other animation assets, spinning them off into their children's division the Fox Children's Network. In 1996, Saban Entertainment merged with the Fox Children's Network to form Fox Kids Worldwide, with this deal giving Saban distribution rights over the Marvel animation catalog. During 1998, the show was released onto VHS by Fox and Saban. Their control over the show ended in October 2001, when Saban Entertainment and Fox Kids Worldwide were sold to Disney, who themselves subsequently took over Marvel in 2009. The 2001 Saban/Fox Kids Worldwide sale also included the Fox Family Channel, which was renamed to ABC Family and which started airing the series the following year.

In 1998, Marvel sold the film rights for the Spider-Man IP to Sony. This deal gives Sony exclusive film and live action television rights to over 900 Spider-Man characters, including several characters created specifically for the 1967 Spider-Man animated series.

In November 2002, Buena Vista International Television announced that they would restore the entire series in high definition, fully rescanned from the original negatives.

=== Home video releases ===
==== Region 1 ====
A number of episodes were released on VHS during the 1980s, 1990s and the early 2000s, usually compiled with other Marvel Comics characters' cartoons.

During the early 2000s, Buena Vista Home Entertainment released a selection of episodes as bonus features on DVDs of the 1990s animated series. The episodes on The Ultimate Villain Showdown and The Return of the Green Goblin were mastered from pre-2004 tapes, and Spider-Man vs. Doc Ock and Daredevil Meets Spider-Man used the 2004 remastered versions.

On June 29, 2004, Buena Vista Home Entertainment released a six-disc DVD boxset titled Spider-Man: The '67 Collection; containing all 52 episodes, uncut and fully restored, and also including a booklet with an introduction by creator Stan Lee. This set has since gone out-of-print, with pre-owned copies going for high prices online today, and there are currently no plans for Marvel and Disney to re-release the set.

In 2008 and 2009, Morningstar Entertainment released a number of episodes on DVD in Canada. These were reissues (mastered from VHS and Betamax copies) of the 1985 Prism Video Marvel Video Library. Compared to the early 2000s DVDs by Disney, the video and audio quality on the Morningstar releases are poor.

==== Region 2 ====
In April 2008, Liberation Entertainment secured the home media rights to select Marvel shows from Jetix Europe in select European territories, including Spider-Man. On November 10, the company released the first season of the series as Spider-Man: The Original '67 Series on DVD, with distribution through Lace International, due to Liberation closing their UK branch a few weeks prior in October.

Clear Vision later took over European rights and released the series in several volume sets as Classic Spider-Man. Series 1 was re-released as three single volume sets on August 24, September 14 and October 9 of 2009, with Series 2 and 3 following throughout November 2009 to May 2010. On February 21, 2011, Clear Vision released an 8-disc boxset containing all fifty-two episodes in the United Kingdom, followed with a German release a few weeks later in March.

== In popular culture ==
=== Comics ===
During the Spider-Verse comics storyline, a variation of the TV show's universe appears with the designation of Earth-67. The Spider-Army recruit the Spider-Man of Earth-67 in order to help fight the Inheritors.

=== Film ===
The Peter Parker / Spider-Man from the 1967 animated series (voiced by Jorma Taccone) makes cameo appearances in the animated Spider-Verse feature films. In Spider-Man: Into the Spider-Verse, Miguel O'Hara / Spider-Man 2099 (voiced by Oscar Isaac) develops a device allowing inter-dimensional travel and goes to the "beginning" with the universe also being designated as Earth-67 where O’Hara encounters the local Spider-Man with footage from the episode Double Identity being used. In Spider-Man: Across the Spider-Verse, Miles Morales (voiced by Shameik Moore) easily avoids him in a chase scene due to his slow and stilted animation.

=== Pointing meme ===
A scene from the episode "Double Identity", featuring two Spider-Men pointing at each other, has become a popular internet meme, to which the post-credit scene in Spider-Man: Into the Spider-Verse references. The same meme was parodied in Spider-Man: No Way Home twice: first, for a scene where Ned Leeds tries to speak to his Peter Parker, only for all three to confusedly respond; the second time for a scene where they are trying to figure out which Peter is which for purposes of combat strategy. According to Andrew Garfield, the latter instance occurred naturally during filming, but the first instance was done at his suggestion after the production team was trying to figure out how to reference the meme. On the first day of filming No Way Home, Garfield, Tobey Maguire, and Tom Holland intentionally recreated the meme during a photoshoot: the image was released on the film's Twitter account in February 2022 to promote the home video release and quickly went viral. The meme was included in a promotional video for Spider-Verse from the mobile game Marvel Strike Force. The meme was parodied again in Spider-Man: Across the Spider-Verse, where all the members of the Spider-Society are confused from Miguel when he orders them to "stop Spider-Man." The meme was also used in Spider-Man 2 as a victory emote. The meme was also used in an episode of Spidey and His Amazing Friends.
