= Ad and Lib =

Canadian television series

- Starring: Larry D. Mann; Joe Austin
- Country of origin: Canada
- Original language: English
- No. of seasons: 1

Production
- Producer: Leo Orenstein
- Running time: 15 minutes

Original release
- Network: CBC Television
- Release: 12 April – 28 June 1954

Ad and Lib is a Canadian television series which aired on CBC Television in 1954.

== Premise ==
General store operators Ad (Joe Austin) and Lib (Larry D. Mann) are located in a somewhat rural setting. Their improvised dialogue discusses the difference between urban and rural lifestyles.

== Production and scheduling ==
Leo Orenstein produced Ad and Lib.

The series aired weekdays at 6:30 p.m. (Eastern). After little more than three months, CBC cancelled the programme without warning.

== Critical reception ==
Ottawa Citizen television critic Bob Blackburn described the series as CBC's "second biggest turkey" of 1954, behind Clarke, Campbell & Co..
