= The Wacky World of Mother Goose =

- Official release poster
- Directed by: Jules Bass
- Written by: Romeo Muller
- Story by: Arthur Rankin Jr.
- Based on: Tales of Mother Goose by Charles Perrault
- Produced by: Arthur Rankin Jr.
- Starring: Margaret Rutherford
- Music by: George Wilkins (music); Jules Bass (lyrics)
- Production company: Videocraft International Limited
- Distributed by: Embassy Pictures
- Release date: September 27, 1967
- Running time: 81 minutes
- Countries: United States; Japan
- Language: English

The Wacky World of Mother Goose is a 1967 animated musical fantasy film made by Rankin/Bass, written by Romeo Muller and directed by Jules Bass based on Charles Perrault's stories and nursery rhymes. The movie is the first cel animated theatrical feature by Rankin and Bass. It features Humpty Dumpty, the Old Woman Who Lives in a Shoe, and the Crooked Man (the villain). Mother Goose is voiced by Margaret Rutherford in her final film role.

== Plot ==
In the land of Old King Cole: Jack and Jill, Simple Simon, Georgie Porgie, Humpty Dumpty, and the others are worried when Mother Goose has to visit her sister who lives beyond the Moon. Meanwhile, Count Warptwist the Crooked Man is up to no good and will stop at nothing to rule the land, so it's up to the good characters to try and stop him.

== Cast ==
- Margaret Rutherford - Mother Goose
- Bob McFadden - Humpty Dumpty / Zig Zag / Paddy Cake / Old King Cole
- Bradley Bolke - Count Warptwist / Georgy Porgy / Little Dog / Brutus
- Laura Leslie - Princess Harmony
- James Daugherty - Baker / Crooked Knights
- Craig Sechler - Jack Horner
- Susan Melvin - Mary Mary Quite Contrary
- Kevin Gavin - Prince Robin / Cat with a Fiddle
- Bryna Raeburn - Old Mother Hubbard / Mother Goose's sister / Patricia Pumpkin Eater
- Robert Harter - Butcher / Crooked Knights / Town Crier
- William Marine - Candlestick Maker / Crooked Knights

== See also ==
- List of American films of 1967
