= Larry D. Mann =

Canadian actor (1922–2014)

- Mann in a promotional picture for Black Eye (1974)
- Born: 18 December 1922; Toronto, Ontario, Canada
- Died: 6 January 2014 (aged 91); Los Angeles, California, U.S.
- Education: Vaughan Road Academy
- Occupations: Actor, broadcaster
- Years active: 1949–1991
- Spouse: Gloria (Kochberg) Mann (m. 1946; died 2017)
- Children: Danny Mann (voice actor; born 1951)
- Relatives: Paul Mann (brother) (1913–1985)

Larry D. Mann (18 December 1922 – 6 January 2014) was a Canadian actor and broadcaster. He is best known as "The Boss" in a series of Bell Canada television commercials in the 1980s and voicing Yukon Cornelius in Rudolph the Red-Nosed Reindeer.

== Life and career ==
Larry D. Mann was born in Toronto, Ontario, on 18 December 1922. Before his acting career, he was a disc jockey on 1050 CHUM radio in Toronto in 1949, and attended school there at Vaughan Road Academy.

Mann voiced the character of Yukon Cornelius in the classic Rankin-Bass Christmas special Rudolph the Red-Nosed Reindeer. He also provided voices for characters in several other Rankin-Bass television series and specials.

Mann's film career spanned four decades. He came to the attention of CBC audiences in 1953 when he kidded around with the puppet Uncle Chichimus on the show Let's See. According to a CBC Archives article, Mann got the job when his friend, actor Don Harron, pointed him out to producer Norman Jewison. Mann also appeared in more than 20 movies, including In the Heat of the Night, Bullitt, and The Sting.

Mann's many television credits include Get Smart; Gunsmoke; The Man From U.N.C.L.E.; Bewitched; Hogan's Heroes; Honey West; The Green Hornet; Green Acres; Columbo; Quincy, M.E. and Hill Street Blues. He also played the title role in a series of Bell Canada TV commercials called "The Boss" for ten years beginning in 1981.

His last role was on Homefront in 1991.

His brother Paul Mann was an actor and drama instructor, who appeared in the films America America and Fiddler on the Roof. His son, Danny Mann, also entered the entertainment industry as a voice actor.

== Death ==
Mann died of natural causes at age 91 on 6 January 2014 in Los Angeles.

== Personal life ==
Mann was born Leibish Libman in Toronto, Ontario. A dual citizen of Canada and the United States, he was a veteran of World War II, serving four years in the Royal Canadian Air Force (RCAF). His military service included participation in the Battle of Normandy as well as the liberation of the Bergen-Belsen concentration camp.

On September 1, 1946, Mann married Gloria Kochberg Mann. The couple remained married for 67 years until his death in January 2014, and together they had four children. One of their sons, Danny (born 1951) is a voice actor. Danny is best known for voicing Ferdinand the Indian Runner duck in the live action/animated hybrid film Babe and its sequel Babe: Pig in the City.

Mann's older brother, Paul Mann (1913–1985), was an distinguished theatre and film actor and drama instructor who founded Paul Mann's Actors Workshop in New York. Paul also appeared as a character actor in prominent feature films such as America America and the 1971 cinematic adaptation of Fiddler on the Roof.

== Filmography ==
=== Films ===
- 1958: Flaming Frontier as Bradford
- 1963: The Quick and the Dead as Parker
- 1963: Spencer's Mountain as Spencer Brother (uncredited)
- 1964: Robin and the 7 Hoods as Workman (uncredited)
- 1964: Kisses for My President as Tour Guide (uncredited)
- 1965: Willy McBean and his Magic Machine as Professor Von Rotten (voice)
- 1965: Harlow as Editor (uncredited)
- 1966: The Singing Nun as Mr. Duvries
- 1966: The Russians Are Coming, the Russians Are Coming as Man with Cat (uncredited)
- 1966: The Daydreamer
- 1966: The Appaloosa as Priest
- 1966: Dead Heat on a Merry-Go-Round as Officer Howard
- 1966: The Swinger as John Mallory
- 1967: A Covenant with Death as Chillingworth
- 1967: Caprice as Inspector Kapinsky
- 1967: Rough Night in Jericho as Purley (uncredited)
- 1967: The Perils of Pauline as Prince Benji's Father (uncredited)
- 1967: In the Heat of the Night as Watkins
- 1968: The Wicked Dreams of Paula Schultz as Grossmeyer
- 1968: Bullitt (voice, uncredited)
- 1969: Angel in My Pocket as Bishop Morenschild
- 1970: The Liberation of L.B. Jones as Grocer
- 1970: There Was a Crooked Man... as Harry
- 1970: The Wild Country as The Marshal (uncredited)
- 1971: Scandalous John as Bartender
- 1971: The Strange Monster of Strawberry Cove as John Halper
- 1972: Get to Know Your Rabbit as Mr. Seager
- 1973: Kloot's Kounty as Crazywolf (voice)
- 1973: Pay Your Buffalo Bill as Crazywolf / Big Red (voice)
- 1973: Ten Miles to Gallop as Crazywolf (voice)
- 1973: Charley and the Angel as Felix
- 1973: Oklahoma Crude as Deke Watson
- 1973: The Sting as Train Conductor
- 1973: Treasure Island as Doctor Livesey (voice)
- 1973: Cotter
- 1974: Gold Struck (voice)
- 1974: The Badge and the Beautiful as Townspeople / Bartender / Priest / Lauri Be (voice)
- 1974: By Hoot or By Brook as The Fox / Coach Driver / Guard (voice)
- 1974: Big Beef at the O.K. Corral as Billy the Kidder (voice)
- 1974: Saddle Soap Opera as Judge Soy Bean / Hotel Clerk (voice)
- 1974: Mesa Trouble as Townspeople (voice)
- 1974: Black Eye as Reverend Avery
- 1974: Oliver Twist (voice)
- 1976: Death Riders
- 1976: Pony Express Rider as Blackmore
- 1980: The Octagon as Tibor
- 1980: A Snow White Christmas as Mirror (voice)

=== Animated shorts ===
- 1969–1972: Tijuana Toads, as Crazylegs Crane (voice)
- 1972–1974: The Blue Racer, as Blue Racer (voice)
- 1978: Crazylegs Crane, as Crazylegs Crane (voice)

=== Television series ===
- 1954: Ad and Lib
- 1954–1959: Howdy Doody
- 1957–1958: Last of the Mohicans
- 1956–1957: The Barris Beat
- 1958–1959: The Adventures of Chich
- 1958–1959: Here's Duffy
- 1961: Tales of the Wizard of Oz, voice of Rusty the Tin Man and The Wicked Witch of the West
- 1961: The New Adventures of Pinocchio as Foxy Q. Fibble (voice)
- 1965–1969: Bewitched in several guest appearances
- 1965: The Big Valley guest appearance as Jake Kyles in "The Murdered Party"
- 1966: My Favourite Martian, guest appearance as Butterball (Season 3, Episode 22)
- 1966: Get Smart, guest appearance as Victor Slade
- 1966: Shane, guest appearance as Harve Hanes
- 1966: Hogan's Heroes, guest appearance as Dr. Vanetti
- 1966: The Iron Horse, guest appearance as Kellam in "A Dozen Ways to Kill a Man"
- 1966–1967: The Man From U.N.C.L.E. in several guest roles
- 1967: Rango as Purcell in "Requiem for a Ranger"
- 1967: Hogan's Heroes, guest appearance as SS General Brenner
- 1967–1968: Accidental Family as Marty Warren in 11 episodes
- 1967: The Green Hornet as Dr. Eric Mabouse in "Invasion from Outer Space: Parts 1 & 2"
- 1967: Dragnet 1967 as Pete Benson
- 1967: I Spy: guest appearance as Arbuckle in "Night Train to Madrid"
- 1967–1973: Gunsmoke in several guest roles
- 1968: The Guns of Will Sonnett guest appearance as Mort Lucas in "Guilt"
- 1968: Mannix guest appearance as Orlando Quinn in "To Kill a Writer"
- 1968: It Takes a Thief guest appearance as Dedier in "The Lay of the Land"
- 1969: It Takes a Thief guest appearance as Achille Morales in "The Baranoff Timetable"
- 1969: Hogan's Heroes, guest appearance as Igor Illyich Zagoskin
- 1970–1971: Green Acres in several guest roles including crooked real estate con-man Lawrence David in the final episode.
- 1970: Sabrina and the Groovy Ghoulies
- 1971: Bonanza guest appearance as Alex Steiner in "An Earthquake Called Callahan"
- 1972: Mod Squad guest appearance as Harry Burns in "Can You Hear Me Out There?"
- 1973–1974: Dr. Simon Locke as Lieutenant Jack Gordon
- 1976: The Pink Panther Laugh and a Half Hour and a Half Show (voice)
- 1976–1985: Walt Disney's Wonderful World of Color in several guest roles
- 1978: Quincy, M.E. as Dr. Jones in "Ashes to Ashes"
- 1978: How the West Was Won guest appearances as Mr. Pennington
- 1978: Fangface (voice)
- 1979: The Plastic Man Comedy/Adventure Show (voice)
- 1981: Dukes of Hazzard as Boss J.W. Hickman
- 1981–1987: Hill Street Blues, as Judge Lee Oberman
- 1983: The All-New Scooby and Scrappy-Doo Show (voice)
- 1990: MacGyver guest appearance as Capt. Ion Cuzo in "Humanity"
- 1989: The Pink Panther and Friends (voice)
- 1985: MacGyver guest appearance as Daniel Sims in "The Heist"

=== Television films and specials ===
- 1964: Rudolph the Red Nosed Reindeer, voice of Yukon Cornelius and vocal effects for Bumble, The Abominable Snow Monster of The North
- 1964: Return to Oz, voice of Rusty Tinman and The Wicked Witch of the West
- 1971: Dead Men Tell No Tales
- 1971: Do Not Fold, Spindle, or Mutilate
- 1977: Columbo: Murder Under Glass
- 1979: The New Misadventures of Ichabod Crane, voice of Rip Van Winkle
- 1980: A Snow White Christmas (voice)
- 1981: Dennis the Menace in Mayday for Mother (TV), voice of Mr. Wilson
- 1991: Love, Lies and Murder (TV)
