= Heidi (2005 animated film) =

- DVD cover
- Directed by: Alan Simpson
- Written by: Susan Snooks; Ann MacNaughton; Mark Slater
- Based on: Heidi by Johanna Spyri
- Starring: Lara Wurmer
- Production companies: TV-Loonland AG; Telemagination Limited; Nelvana Limited
- Distributed by: Metrodome Distribution (United Kingdom); Loonland Pictures (Note: Through 20th Century Fox.) (Germany); Kaboom! Entertainment (Canada)
- Release dates: 26 September 2005 (United Kingdom); 22 December 2005 (Germany); 4 April 2006 (Canada)
- Running time: 76 minutes
- Countries: Germany; United Kingdom; Canada
- Languages: English; German
- Budget: $4.5 million

Heidi is a 2005 animated adaptation of the 1881 novel of the same name by Johanna Spyri, produced by Nelvana, Telemagination and TV-Loonland AG.

== Voice cast ==
=== English cast ===
- Tajja Isen as Heidi
- Christopher Plummer as Grandfather
- Jackie Burroughs as Rottenmeier
- Juan Chioran as Sebastian
- Corinne Conley as Grannie
- Michael D'Ascenzo as Peter
- Colm Feore as Mr. Sesseman
- Kathy Greenwood as Aunt Dete
- Ellen-Ray Hennessy as Birgit
- Ashley Taylor as Clara Sesemann
- Paul Soles as Dr. Reboux

== Development ==
The film Heidi was announced in October 2001 as a co-production between Nelvana, TV-Loonland AG and KirchMedia's Taurus Produktion division. The film was originally intended to be released in 2003, with a German release occurring between a late 2003 – early 2004 cycle.

The development of the film was heavily affected by Kirch's bankruptcy in April 2002. In June, it was revealed that Taurus Produktion had missed out on its payments to TV-Loonland, causing the film's production to halt. This also led to layoffs at TV-Loonland's Loonland Animation studio in Hungary, although the company stated that they were still on the verge of completing the project.

In early 2003, the film was brought back in the production. Nelvana had a stronger focus in the production, and had a 25% ownership stake while Loonland took over the rest. The animation was taken over by Loonland's Telemagination studio in the United Kingdom, while sale and leaseback were arranged through Ingenious Media.

== Release ==
=== Germany ===
In 2004, Super RTL picked up German broadcast rights to the film.

In 2005, TV-Loonland acquired the rights to distribute the film in Germany, through the formation of Loonland Pictures, an in-house theatrical distribution arm for their feature films. NFP marketing and the German branch of 20th Century Fox handled marketing and distribution. The film was released theatrically for the Christmas season in Germany in the same year on 22 December. Home media rights were sold by TV-Loonland to Concorde Home Entertainment, while Super RTL aired the film in 2007.

Concorde released the film on DVD on 22 June 2006 and was reissued in March 2014 by Rough Trade Distribution.

=== International ===
The film was released direct-to-video or as a television film in most territories.

Metrodome Distribution released the film on DVD in the United Kingdom on 26 September 2005. In Canada, Kaboom! Entertainment released the film on DVD on 4 April 2006.

In March 2006, at that year's MIPTV, TV-Loonland pre-sold television rights to TSR in Switzerland, Disney Channel in France, and YLE in Finland. The MRA Entertainment Group acquired home media rights in Australia as part of a package with other Loonland-owned material.

== Video game ==
A video game based on the film for Microsoft Windows and Game Boy Advance was released by East Entertainment Media at the same time as the film's German theatrical release.

== See also ==
- Heidi's Song, a 1982 Hanna-Barbera film based on the Spyri work.
- List of animated feature-length films
