= Charlie Had One but He Didn't Like It, So He Gave It to Us =

- Genre: Comedy
- Written by: Barrie Baldaro; David Harriman; Paul Soles
- Country of origin: Canada
- Original language: English
- No. of seasons: 1

Production
- Producer: Terry Kyne
- Running time: 30 minutes

Original release
- Network: CBC Television
- Release: 20 July – 12 October 1966

Charlie Had One but He Didn't Like It, So He Gave It to Us is a Canadian sketch comedy television series that aired on CBC Television in 1966.

== Premise ==
This Toronto-produced show starred Paul Soles and Barrie Baldaro, who were joined each week by a female guest. Producer Terry Kyne described the series as a "montage of ridiculous jokes", noting that some improvisation was used; Kyne also indicated that the program's original working title had been Charlie Had One But He Didn't Like It, So He Gave It To Us, and We Didn't Like It Either So We're Going to Give It Back to Charlie.

Episodes were recorded at locations such as Toronto's Exhibition Stadium. Soles, Baldaro and David Harriman were the show's writers.

== Scheduling ==
This half-hour series was broadcast on Wednesdays at 11:40 p.m. (Eastern) from 20 July to 12 October 1966.
