= Mad Monster Party? =

1967 musical comedy film

Mad Monster Party
- Theatrical release poster by Frank Frazetta
- Directed by: Jules Bass
- Screenplay by: Len Korobkin; Harvey Kurtzman
- Story by: Arthur Rankin Jr.
- Produced by: Arthur Rankin Jr.
- Starring: Boris Karloff; Phyllis Diller; Ethel Ennis; Gale Garnett
- Cinematography: Tadahito Mochinaga
- Music by: Maury Laws; Jules Bass
- Production company: Rankin/Bass Productions
- Distributed by: Embassy Pictures
- Release date: March 8, 1967 (United States)
- Running time: 95 minutes
- Countries: United States; Japan
- Language: English

Mad Monster Party is a 1967 stop-motion animated musical comedy film produced by Rankin/Bass Productions for Embassy Pictures. The film stars the voices of Boris Karloff, Allen Swift, Gale Garnett and Phyllis Diller. It tells the story of a mad scientist who achieves the secret of total destruction. He summons all the monsters to his island home to show it off, while planning to retire as the head of the "Worldwide Organization of Monsters".

The film was created using Rankin/Bass's "Animagic" stop-motion animation process, supervised by Tadahito Mochinaga at MOM Productions in Tokyo, Japan. The process involved photographing figurines a frame at a time, then re-positioning them, exposing another frame, and so forth.

Although less well known than Rankin/Bass's holiday specials, it has become a cult film. The film is a camp homage to the classic monster movies of the 1930s-1940s. It was one of Karloff's final projects, and his last film in connection to Frankenstein.

== Plot ==
Scientist Baron Boris von Frankenstein achieves his ultimate ambition, the secret of total destruction. Having perfected and tested the formula, he sends out messenger bats carrying invitations to summon all monsters to the Isle of Evil in the Caribbean Sea. The Baron intends to inform them of his discovery and also to reveal his imminent retirement as head of the Worldwide Organization of Monsters.

Besides his Monster (sometimes referred to as "Fang") and the Monster's more intelligent mate who reside on the Isle of Evil with Boris, the invitees include Count Dracula, the Mummy, Quasimodo (referred to as "The Hunchback of Notre-Dame"), the Werewolf, The Invisible Man, Dr. Jekyll and Mr. Hyde, and the Creature from the Black Lagoon (referred to as simply "The Creature").

Frankenstein's beautiful assistant Francesca confirms that all invitations have been delivered and inquires about one of the addressees, a Felix Flanken. Frankenstein explains that Felix is his nephew and successor in the monster business. This displeases Francesca, who covets the role for herself. She asks why there was no invitation for "It". Boris replies that "It" was not invited since "It" can be a crushing bore, explaining that "It" even crushed the island's wild boars in his bare hands the last time "It" was invited.

Felix Flanken is a drug store pharmacist somewhere in the United States. Incompetent and asthmatic but good-natured, he is a constant burden on the drug store's greedy owner Mr. Kronkite. A mailman arrives with Felix's invitation and he joyously accepts. He boards a freighter headed for the Isle alongside the other monsters. The ship's crew are wary of the unusual passengers.

Frankenstein has his zombie butler Yetch, Chef Mafia Machiavelli, and the zombie bellhops make preparations for the upcoming party while having some zombies patrol the Isle to ensure that "It" does not arrive uninvited. The monsters begin to arrive on the freighter that Felix is also traveling on. During dinner, Frankenstein shows them the formula which he will demonstrate the next day while naming his successor. Francesca secretly meets with Dracula to inform him about Felix, promising to share Frankenstein's secrets when she becomes the successor if Dracula were to get rid of Felix. When they catch the Monster's Mate eavesdropping, she and Francesca begin to cat-fight while the other monsters have an all out food fight.

Felix arrives to the island and is greeted by his uncle and Francesca, who takes Felix on a tour of the island where the Mummy, Werewolf and Dracula plan to attack. While the human Felix proves to be unsuitably kind-hearted, the monsters nonetheless plot to eliminate him and gain control of the secret formula, but Felix continually accidentally foils their attempts.

Later, Frankenstein tells Felix about his retirement, making his nephew leader of all the monsters in the world. Felix naturally feels reluctant to take the job. Over time, Francesca develops feelings for Felix after he obliviously saves her on multiple occasions. As Dracula, Frankenstein's Monster, and the Monster's Mate descend upon Francesca, she sends out a letter (via messenger bat) to an unknown recipient.

When the monsters corner Felix upon capturing Francesca, they are frightened at the arrival of "It" who proceeds to rampage since he was not invited. "It" snatches up the monsters and Francesca (on whom "It" develops a crush).

Felix rushes to tell his uncle what happened and is instructed to head to the boat. Frankenstein leads the zombies in rescuing Francesca from "It" using biplanes. Boris convinces "It" to let Francesca go and to take him instead. "It" complies. Felix and Francesca manage to escape the island in the boat as Frankenstein and the remainder of the monsters remain in "It"'s clutches. Displeased that the monsters tried to steal the secret for themselves and attempted to kill Felix as well as having to put up with "It", Frankenstein sacrifices himself by dropping the vial of the formula, destroying the Isle of Evil and everything on it.

The destruction is witnessed by Felix and Francesca offshore. Felix expresses a desire to begin a family with Francesca, who tearfully admits that she is not human, but in fact a robot creation of Frankenstein's. Felix responds that "none of us are perfect", mechanically repeating the last two words, indicating that he is also his uncle's robot creation.

== Cast ==
- Boris Karloff as Baron Boris von Frankenstein, a mad scientist who resides on the Isle of Evil
- Alan Swift as:
  - Felix Flanken, the nephew of Boris
  - Count Dracula, a vampire who is invited to the Isle of Evil by Boris
  - Frankenstein's Monster "Fang", a simulacrum creation of Boris who mostly makes sounds
  - The Werewolf, an unnamed werewolf who is invited to the Isle of Evil by Boris
  - The Hunchback of Notre-Dame, a hunchbacked figure who is invited to the Isle of Evil by Boris
  - The Invisible Man, an unseen man in a fez, sunglasses, and housecoat who is invited to the Isle of Evil by Boris
  - Dr. Jekyll and Mr. Hyde, a scientist invited to the Isle of Evil by Boris who keeps his transformation serum in his special cane
  - "It", a giant ape-like monster with a chimpanzee-like head, gorilla-like body, and human-shaped feet who is a knock-off of King Kong.
  - Yetch, the zombie butler of Boris
  - A Skeleton
  - Mafia Machiavelli, Boris's cook who prepares the meals for Boris' event and is assisted by a zombie kitchen staff
  - Mr. Kronkite, a pharmacy proprietor who Felix works for
  - The Freighter Captain
  - The First Mate
  - The Mailman
- Gale Garnett as Francesca, the female assistant of Boris
- Phyllis Diller as The Monster's Mate, a simulacrum creation of Boris who is more intelligent than "Fang"
- Ethel Ennis as the Title Song Singer

== Crew ==
- Directed by Jules Bass
- Produced by Arthur Rankin Jr.
- Executive producer – Joseph E. Levine
- Associate producer – Larry Roemer
- Screenplay by Len Korobkin, Harvey Kurtzman
- Story by Arthur Rankin Jr.
- Music and lyrics by Maury Laws, Jules Bass
- Characters designed by Jack Davis
- Continuity design – Don Duga
- "Animagic" technician – Tad Mochinaga
- Assistant director – Kizo Nagashima
- Choreography by "Killer Joe" Piro
- Music composed and scored by Maury Laws
- Sound engineers – Eric Tomlinson, Peter Page, Stephen Frohock

== Production ==
The film was created using Rankin/Bass's "Animagic" stop-motion animation process, supervised by Tadahito Mochinaga at MOM Productions in Tokyo, Japan. The process involved photographing figurines a frame at a time, then re-positioning them, exposing another frame, and so forth. Known as stop-motion animation, it was the same approach used in RKO Pictures' King Kong, Art Clokey's Gumby and Davey and Goliath, and many other films, commercials and television specials.

Classic monster films were enjoying a resurgence in popularity in the late 1960s, along with more comedy-centered examples, The Addams Family and The Munsters. This campy film is a spoof of horror themes, complete with musical numbers and inside jokes.

Mad Magazine creator Harvey Kurtzman penned the script (with writer Len Korobkin) and Mad artist Jack Davis designed many of the characters. Rumors that Forrest J. Ackerman had a hand in the script have never been confirmed and his name never appeared in the on-screen credits or in original promotion for the film at the time of its release. Rankin/Bass historian Rick Goldschmidt, in liner notes accompanying the Anchor Bay DVD release, denied that Ackerman was ever involved, at the same time as the DVD packaging promoted Ackerman's name. Goldschmidt repeated his claims on this in a 2006 blog entry, based on his interviews with Korobkin, who claimed to have written the original screenplay, which then was revised by Kurtzman, but never worked with Ackerman.

In addition to the famous monsters seen in the film, Mad Monster Party? also features several celebrity likenesses. Karloff and Diller's characters are both designed to look like the actors portraying them, while Baron Frankenstein's lackey, Yetch, is a physical and vocal caricature of Peter Lorre. Swift also performs impersonations when voicing his characters, such as James Stewart when voicing Felix, Sydney Greenstreet as the Invisible Man and Charles Laughton as the Freighter Captain.

Mad Monster Party? was one of several family-friendly projects Karloff lent his voice to in his final years (including the 1966 television adaptation of How the Grinch Stole Christmas!). It was his final involvement in a production connected to the Frankenstein mythos that had propelled him to stardom some three decades earlier.

== Music ==
CD cover

Although the opening credits identify Ethel Ennis as singing the opening theme song and, in the same frame, a soundtrack being available on RCA Victor, a commercially released soundtrack was never produced in any format. In September 1998, Percepto released the mono RCA recording on CD. Waxworks Records released it on vinyl in October 2016.

No.	Title	Performer(s)	Length
1.	"Mad Monster Party"	Ethel Ennis
2.	"You're Different"	Phyllis Diller
3.	"Our Time to Shine"	Gale Garnett
4.	"The Mummy"	Dyke and the Blazers
5.	"One Step Ahead"	Boris Karloff & Chorus
6.	"Never Was a Love Like Mine"	Gale Garnett

== Reception ==
The film holds a 67% approval rating on Rotten Tomatoes based on nine reviews. Howard Thompson of The New York Times wrote that "this party should make everybody chuckle".

== Home media ==
The film has been available on video for years, first on original distributor Embassy Pictures' home entertainment unit, and then on other independent labels before StudioCanal acquired some rights to the film. Currently, Lionsgate distributes the film on video under license from StudioCanal.

Before Lionsgate's current video release of Mad Monster Party?, almost all video releases have been from 16 mm film and were of very poor color quality. The original film negative was water-damaged some years ago, but Sony Pictures Television (which now holds the television rights) eventually unearthed an original 35 mm pristine print. This print was digitally remastered, and is the source for the current DVD issue and all subsequent television showings. Anchor Bay released the previous DVD on August 19, 2003, then re-released it on August 23, 2005, with additional features. It was released as a "Special Edition" DVD by Lionsgate on September 8, 2009. The special features include a documentary including interviews with Rick Goldschmidt, Arthur Rankin Jr., voice artist Allen Swift, storyboard artist Don Duga, musical director Maury Laws and others. The film was released on Blu-ray on September 4, 2012. The 2023 Blu-ray release from Umbrella Entertainment saw the film being released in its original aspect ratio of 1.85:1 for the first time since its original theatrical release.

== Other media ==
=== Comic book ===
- Dell Movie Classic: Mad Monster Party (September 1967)

=== TV film ===
Rankin/Bass produced a related TV special called Mad, Mad, Mad Monsters from The ABC Saturday Superstar Movie series, which aired on September 23, 1972. This Halloween special featured many of the same monster characters. Bob McFadden did his imitation of Karloff when voicing Baron Henry von Frankenstein (who resembles Baron Boris von Frankenstein). The animation for the special is provided by Osamu Tezuka's Mushi Production with supervision by Steve Nakagawa, who was also known for his work with Iwao Takamoto at Hanna-Barbera Studios.

== See also ==
- Boris Karloff filmography
- Hotel Transylvania
