= Rocket Robin Hood =

- Opening title
- Genre: Science fiction; Superhero
- Created by: Ralph Bakshi
- Written by: Ralph Bakshi
- Directed by: Alan Green (animation)
- Voices of: Carl Banas; Ed McNamara; Chris Wiggins; Bernard Cowan; Len Birman; Paul Kligman; Gillie Fenwick; John Scott
- Country of origin: Canada
- Original language: English
- No. of seasons: 3
- No. of episodes: 52 + Pilot

Production
- Executive producer: Shamus Culhane
- Producer: Al Guest
- Running time: 22 minutes
- Production companies: Trillium Productions Limited; Krantz Films

Original release
- Network: CBC; Radio-Canada
- Release: 9 October 1966

Related
- Spider-Man

Rocket Robin Hood is a Canadian animated science fiction television series, placing the characters and conflicts of the classic Robin Hood legend in a futuristic, outer space setting. It was produced by Krantz Films, Inc. and aired on CBC Television from 1967 to 1969.

The setting is the last year of the 30th century (year 3000), and a version of the despotic Prince John dominates the National Outer-space Terrestrial Territories (N.O.T.T.). Rocket Robin Hood and his Merry Men live in an asteroid named after Sherwood Forest, using spaceships to undermine John's plans. Despite the team having the term "men" in its name, Maid Marian serves as the team's only female member.

== Summary ==
Rocket Robin Hood leads his "Merry Men"—including the strong, dimwitted and likeable Little John; consummate overeater Friar Tuck (who designs all of the Merry Men's weaponry); his two-fisted, red-headed cousin Will Scarlet; Robin's plucky girlfriend Maid Marian; his sharp-witted right-hand man Alan-a-Dale; scrawny and feisty camp cook Giles (a reformed crook and Gabby Hayes-type); and other characters from the classic story of Robin Hood.

The characters live at the end of the 30th century (in "the astonishing year 3000") on New Sherwood Forest Asteroid and are determined to foil the despotic plans of Prince John and his bumbling lackey, the Sheriff of N.O.T.T. (National Outer-space Terrestrial Territories) and other villains such as Dr. Medulla, Manta, Nocturne and the Warlord of Saturn. Rocket Robin Hood and his Merry Men fly in spaceships and use weapons such as "electro-quarterstaffs".

Each 22-minute episode is divided into three segments, with cliffhangers between the first and second part and the second and third part. All episodes also feature short vignettes of the various characters.

A male chorus sang the opening and closing themes for each of the three seasons in the style of traditional old English ballads mixed with military marches.

== Voice cast ==
- Carl Banas as Titanor / Dr. Manta
- Len Birman as Rocket Robin Hood
- Chris Wiggins as Will Scarlet / Infinata / Baron Blank
- Bernard Cowan as Narrator
- Ed McNamara as Little John
- Paul Kligman as Friar Tuck
- Gillie Fenwick as the Sheriff of N.O.T.T.
- John Scott as Prince John

== Background ==
Rocket Robin Hood was produced and animated at Trillium Productions, an animation studio that was part of the Guest Group—a creative group of companies owned by producer Al Guest. One of the key animators was Jean Mathieson, one of the first female animators in Canada, who later formed Rainbow Animation in Canada and Magic Shadows Inc in the U.S. with Guest, where they continued to produce animated TV programming.

Background designer Richard H. Thomas joined the group late in the second season and brought a dark, almost psychedelic feel to the production under Associate Producer for Krantz Films Ralph Bakshi, who would later become a well known animation producer and would be responsible for, among other series, the animated film versions of Fritz the Cat and The Lord of the Rings. Third-season episodes were animated at Ralph's Spot in New York City, although voices continued to be recorded in Toronto. One of the show's chief designers during this time was science fiction illustrator/comic book artist Gray Morrow.

Bernard Cowan was the show's narrator. Paul Kligman, who voiced J. Jonah Jameson in the 1960s animated version of Spider-Man, was the voice of Friar Tuck. Len Birman, who appeared in the movies Silver Streak (1976) and Bayo (1985), was the voice of Rocket Robin Hood. Len Carlson subbed for Birman as Rocket Robin Hood in some third-season episodes. Carl Banas was the voice of Titanor / Dr. Manta. Ed McNamara provided the voice of Little John. Chris Wiggins was the voice of Will Scarlet.

There was also a French version titled Robin Fusée, broadcast on French-language television in Canada.

=== Connection to Spider-Man ===
The Spider-Man episodes "Phantom from the Depths of Time" and "Revolt in the Fifth Dimension" were largely recycled animation from two episodes ("From Menace to Menace" and "Dementia Five") of Rocket Robin Hood, with Spider-Man substituted for Rocket Robin Hood on the animation cels.

== Episodes ==
=== Pilot ===
Episode
Rocket Robin Hood, The Spore of Doom

=== Season 1 ===
Episode
Prince of Plotters, Warfare Space - Ski Style, How Merry Can You Get
The Time Machine, Ye Old Robinhood, There is No Time Like the Future
Robin versus the Robot Knight, Robin Fights Back, Space Champion
The Mystery of the Crown Jewels, Robin Caged, Marvelo Takes A Fall
Warlord of Saturn, Breath of Fresh Danger, Play with Fire and You Get Burned
Safari, Tricked Trap, Tripped Trap
Wily Giles, Double Dealing Giles, Same Old Giles
Jesse James Rides Again, The Slowest Gun In The Universe, The Big Heist
Giles the Great, A Meal Fit for a Tyrant, The Impossible Goal
City Beneath the Seas, Whirlaround the Whirlpool, Deep Sea Danger
Don Cayote McPherson, The Zap Trap, The Last Laugh
Michael Shawn the Leprechaun; The Wizard O'Day; Oxite, Oxite, Who's Got The Oxite?
Little Little John, The Paralyzing Meteor, Unshrunk
The Marmaduke Caper, Bubble Trouble, Instant Hero
Follow the Leader, The Spaceman Who Came to Dinner, Never Trust Your Uncle
Cleopatra Meets Little John, Dinosaur Go Home, The Best Trick of All
Little George, The Deadly Invasion, The Secret Weapon
The Magic Medallion of Morse, The Sherriff Cooks Up a Wicked Plot, Shooting The Works
The Awful Truce, Cross and Double Cross, Fleet of Phantoms
The Sad, Sad Sheriff of N.O.T.T.; The Great Jewel Robbery; Our Sheriff the Hero
Don't Make a Sound, The Beast Who Came to Dinner, Barking Beasts Don't Bite
Goritang; Monkey Business on the Planet Lucifer; Watch Out, Here Comes the Bride
The Orbiting Salesman, You Gotta Know the Territory, The First Astral Horse Trade
Marlin, the Magician; Who Do Voo Doo?; This Trick Will Kill You

=== Season 2 ===
Episode
Dr. Mortula, The Strange Castle, Bring On the Sun
The Space Wolf, Captives in Space, Partners on the Loose
Dr. Magnet, Magnetic Meteors, The Great Gold Robbery
The Manta Menace, Welcome to My Parlor, The Walls Come Tumbling Down
Young Mr. Ulysses, The Death Traps, The Man Who Turned to Stone
The Incredible Gem of Cosmo Khan, Planet - Planet - Who's Got the Planet?, Escape from Xanador
Who'll Kill Rocket Robin?, The Tomb of Ice, The Finger of Death
Genius in a Bottle, Three to Make Ready, Terror of the Machines
The Tree Kingdom of Caldomar, The Sword of Destruction, Caldomar Ablaze
Catch a Comet by the Tail, Good King Rocket Robinhood, The Celestial Joy Ride
The Emperor Jimmy, The Making of An Emperor, Diamonds Are Prince John's Worst Friend
The Eternal Planet of Romarama, And In This Corner, Say Ahhh...Or Hot Tonsils

=== Season 3 ===
Episode
The Dark Galaxy, Desert Demons, Mummies Revolt
Space Giant, Gigantic Doom, The Black Cloud of Doom
The Haunted Asteroid, Astro City of the Dead, Cosmic Secret of Korgor
The Plot to Destroy N.O.T.T., The Saturnian Dungeon, Runaway Rocket
The Solar Sphinx, Escape From the Pyramid, The Tumbling of Tut
Lord of the Underworld, Revenge of the Underworld, One Minute to Doom
The Ghost Pirates, Escape to Caribia, The Ghost Comes to Life
Dementia Five, Robin's Precious Cargo, Escape Into Reality
Lord of the Shadows, Blackout, Who's Who
The Living Planet, And Into the Fire, The Electric Circle
From Menace to Menace; Manta Asteroid; Gargoyles, Gators and Gorillas
Planet of Dreams, To Stay Awake, The Darkest Hour
Slaves of Medulla, Subterranean Captives, The Tables Turn
Jaws of Steel, Mummy's Host, The Solar Sphinx
The Storm Makers, Into the Eye, The Planet Storms
Return Trip, The Beetle's Claw, Ride of Death

== Broadcast ==
In Canada, the show aired on Toronto's CITY-TV in the 1970s and 1980s, as well as CHEX-TV in Peterborough, on CJOH-TV in the Ottawa area and on CKVU-TV in Vancouver. It also aired on Teletoon Retro.

In South Korea, the show was retitled 로빈후드의 모험 or 로빈후드 (Robin Hood's Adventure or simply Robin Hood), it aired every Monday at 6:35 PM to 7:15 PM (KST) on KBS from November 30, 1970, to September 20, 1971.

In Japan, the series was dubbed by Transglobal and it aired on Fuji TV and other FNS stations from May 1, 1971 to circa 1972. The series was last aired on Nippon TV via おーい!まんがだヨー block in circa 1973. In Hong Kong and Macau, the show aired on Rediffusion Television titled 太空羅賓漢 (Robin Hood in Space), it aired from December 3, 1979, to December 28, 1979. Later, the show was reaired from December 28, 1980, to January 17, 1982, on the same network.

In the UK, the series aired on ITV and its various regional stations from 1968 with regular repeat runs throughout the 1970s and early 80s until 1983.

Currently, the series airs on the RetroTV digital subchannel network in the United States.

== DVD release ==
E1 Entertainment released Volume 1, which contains almost all of season 1, in November 2009 as a four-DVD set (English and French versions, 592 minutes). E1 stated that the episode "Safari" was not included due to unavailable footage.

Volume 2, which encompasses all of seasons 2 and 3, was released in May 2010 also as a four-DVD set (English and French versions, 714 minutes). The French versions of these DVD collections are available separately as Robin fusée.

== See also ==
- List of films and television series featuring Robin Hood
