= Time of Your Life (1963 TV program) =

- Genre: Variety show
- Written by: Des Dixon; Ron Krantz; Terry Ross
- Presented by: Peter Kastner; Michele Finney (1964)
- Country of origin: Canada
- Original language: English
- No. of seasons: 3

Production
- Executive producer: William Davidson
- Producers: Francis Chapman (1963); William Davidson (1964–65); Sandy Stewart (1964–65)
- Running time: 30–60 minutes

Original release
- Network: CBC Television
- Release: 6 January 1963 – 27 June 1965

Time of Your Life is a Canadian television variety show that aired on CBC Television from 1963 to 1965.

== Premise ==
Various types of performances and films were featured in Time of Your Life. Guests included actress Susan Conway and musician Harry Somers who led monthly concert episodes during the debut season. The program's musical director was Paul Hoffert (Lighthouse). Time of Your Life also provided opportunities for emerging television writers.

== Scheduling ==
The first two seasons were broadcast for an hour on Sundays at 2:00 p.m. (Eastern), from 6 January to 30 June 1963, then 5 January to 28 June 1964. The final runs of the program were half-hour episodes on Sundays at 5:30 p.m. from 4 October 1964 to 31 January 1965, then finally from 4 April to 27 June 1965.
