= Scope (Canadian TV series) =

Canadian anthology television series

- Genre: Anthology
- Country of origin: Canada
- Original language: English
- No. of seasons: 1

Production
- Producers: Norman Campbell; Harvey Hart
- Production location: Toronto
- Running time: 30 minutes

Original release
- Network: CBC Television
- Release: 19 December 1954 – 1 May 1955

Scope is a Canadian anthology television series that aired on CBC Television from 1954 to 1955.

== Premise ==
This series was one of the CBC's early venues for broadcasting artistic works. It consisted of various presentations such as ballet, documentary, drama and opera. The debut episode featured Sunshine Town, a musical version of the Stephen Leacock story. The National Ballet of Canada performed The Nutcracker for the second episode. The third episode in January 1955 featured Eric Nicol's review of the previous year. Another episode included a performance of The Telephone, the Gian Carlo Menotti opera, highlighting a theme of communications. Sketches by Federico García Lorca and Anton Chekhov formed an episode concerning the topic of marriage. "Sea of Troubles", a documentary by Lister Sinclair, was featured in another episode.

== Scheduling ==
This half-hour series was broadcast Sundays at 10:00 p.m. from 19 December 1954 to 1 May 1955.
