= Paul Kligman =

Romanian-born Canadian actor (1923–1985)

- Born: 21 January 1923; Kingdom of Romania
- Died: 29 August 1985 (aged 62); Toronto, Ontario, Canada
- Resting place: Pardes Shalom Cemetery, Vaughan, Ontario, Canada
- Education: University of Manitoba
- Occupation: Actor
- Years active: 1952–1985
- Spouse: Anne Rabinovitch

Paul Kligman (21 January 1923 – 29 August 1985) was a Canadian actor.

== Biography ==
Born in Romania, he emigrated to Canada where he spent his youth in Winnipeg and studied at the University of Manitoba. He moved to Toronto in 1950 and established his career there. In addition to appearing in CBC Television's 1952 Sunshine Sketches, he was a featured performer with Wayne and Shuster since the comedy duo's early television broadcasts.

He is most famous for his voice acting in various animated television series, especially in the 1960s The Marvel Super Heroes (1966) and Spider-Man (1967), both from Marvel Comics as the first voices of J. Jonah Jameson, General Ross, Red Skull, Krang, Mole Man and Power Man (Erik Josten). He voiced numerous gruff characters, including Donner and Coach Comet, in the 1964 Rankin-Bass adaptation of Rudolph the Red-Nosed Reindeer.

Kligman died aged 62 at Toronto's North York General Hospital following heart failure.

== Filmography ==
Year	Title	Role	Notes
1960-1961	The New Adventures of Pinocchio	Cool S. Cat (voice)	
1964	Rudolph, the Red-Nosed Reindeer	Donner / Coach Comet (voice)	
1965	Willy McBean and His Magic Machine	Columbus / Mr. Columbo / Sitting Bull (voice)	
1966	The Marvel Super Heroes	Red Skull / Warlord Krang / Mole Man / Metal Master / Power Man / Additional Voices (voice)	
1967	Rocket Robin Hood	Friar Tuck (voice)	
1967	Spider-Man	J. Jonah Jameson / Police Officer / Harry / Additional Voices (voice)	
1985	Reckless Disregard	Amos Greisman	TV movie
1986	Night Heat	Rosenzwig	Episode: Dead to Rights; Posthumous appearance

== Bibliography ==
- Kligman, Paul (1975). It All Ends Up in a Shopping Bag: An Autobiographical Novel. McClelland and Stewart. ISBN 0-7710-4524-7.
