= The New Adventures of Pinocchio (TV series) =

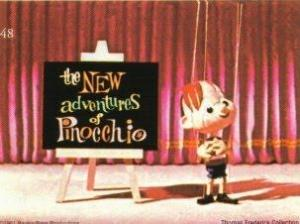
- Pinocchio in the series' first opening title sequence
- Based on: The Adventures of Pinocchio by Carlo Collodi
- Written by: Jules Bass; Arthur Rankin, Jr.
- Directed by: Jules Bass; Arthur Rankin, Jr.; Tadahito Mochinaga
- Voices of: Stan Francis; Larry D. Mann; Paul Kligman; Claude Ray; Joan Fowler; Jack Mather
- Theme music composer: Jules Bass
- Countries of origin: United States; Canada; Japan
- Original languages: English; Japanese
- No. of seasons: 1
- No. of episodes: 130

Production
- Producers: Jules Bass; Arthur Rankin, Jr.
- Cinematography: Tadahito Mochinaga
- Running time: 4.2 min.
- Production companies: Videocraft Productions; Dentsu Studios; MOM Production

Original release
- Release: February 6, 1961 – 1961

The New Adventures of Pinocchio is a 1961 American-Canadian-Japanese syndicated stop motion animated television series produced by Rankin/Bass Productions in the United States and made by Dentsu Studios in Japan. Created by Arthur Rankin, Jr. and his partner Jules Bass, it was based on the 1883 book The Adventures of Pinocchio written by Italian author, Carlo Collodi. The series was Rankin/Bass' first production to be made in "Animagic", a stop motion puppet animation technique which, in association with the company, was done by Tadahito Mochinaga's MOM Productions.

A total of 130 five-minute "chapters" were produced in 1960–61. These segments made up a series of five-chapter, 25-minute episodes. The show was deliberately designed to not emulate Walt Disney's popular 1940 version of Pinocchio in character design or characterization; the puppet wore a T-shirt and shorts instead of a Tyrolean hat, the Cricket (not Jiminy Cricket) had a high-pitched, grating voice, and Geppetto was calm and deliberate, unlike Disney's excitable and absent-minded woodcarver.

The series premiered the week of February 6, 1961 on select local stations. During 1963–64, the series was also aired in Japan on Fuji TV as part of another stop motion TV series, Prince Ciscorn (シスコン王子, lit. Ciscorn Ōji), based on the manga by Fujiko Fujio and also produced by Tadahito Mochinaga for Studio KAI and Dentsu.

Nineteen years later, in 1980, Rankin/Bass produced another stop motion adaptation of the novel for the American Broadcasting Company, a Christmas special called Pinocchio's Christmas, which featured a different voice cast including George S. Irving as Geppetto; Todd Porter as Pinocchio; Alan King as Maestro Fire-Eater; Allen Swift as the Fox; Pat Bright as the Cat; and Diane Leslie as Lady Azura.

== Summary ==
An old wood carver Geppetto narrates the series, explaining on how he made a magically living puppet named Pinocchio, who can walk, jump, run and do other things without strings. In addition, he is also known to have his nose grow whenever he tell lies on anything be it right or wrong. Displeased with the need to continue living as a puppet, Pinocchio sets off on a journey with his friend Cricket to find the Blue Fairy, hoping that she can transform him into a real boy (in other words, a human) with her magic. But along the way, Pinocchio and Cricket encounter the two anthropomorphic animal cons, Foxy Q. Fibble and Cool S. Cat, as well as the greatest adventures, mishaps, danger and excitement than they would ever imagine.

== Character voices ==
- Stan Francis - Geppetto
- Larry D. Mann - Foxy Q. Fibble
- Paul Kligman - Cool S. Cat
- Carl Banas
- Claude Ray
- Joan Fowler - Pinocchio, Various
- Jack Mather - Cricket

== Production staff ==
- Writers/Producers/Directors - Arthur Rankin, Jr., Jules Bass
- Animation Director - Tadahito Mochinaga (uncredited)
- Puppet Makers - Ichiro Komuro, Kyoko Kita, Reiko Yamagata, Sumiko Hosaka (all uncredited)
- Animation - Hiroshi Tabata, Koichi Oikawa, Fumiko Magari, Tadanari Okamoto (all uncredited)

== Episodes ==
1. It's No Joke Picnic
2. Ring・a・ding・ding・ding
3. Sprinkle Sprinkle Little Star
4. Ten Cents a Glance
5. Pretty Pussycat Nips
6. Rocket to Fame
7. Short Circuit
8. It's Cool in the Cooler
9. Back Stage Life
10. All Down Hill
11. Too Many Ghosts
12. Horse Sense
13. One Little Indian
14. Cattle Rattle
15. By Hook or By Crook
16. Not So Private Eye
17. Cash and Carry Harry
18. Dognet
19. The Gold Brick Trick
20. Simoro's Last Chance
21. Romin' in the Glomin'
22. Flying Bagpipes
23. Hide and Seek
24. Stop Gap Sap
25. Feud for All
26. Glockenspiel
27. Peanut Butter Battle
28. Upside Down Town
29. Robot Rhapsody
30. Big Bomb Cake
31. Back Track
32. Hot Rod Hobo
33. Duck Luck
34. Danny the Boon
35. Dynamite Bright
36. O'Lafferty the Magnificent
37. Lock Stock and Crock
38. Hup Two Three Four
39. No Banks Thanks
40. The Crick Trick
41. Grab Bag
42. Pick a Pocket
43. Kangaroo Capers
44. Paunchy Pouch
45. Kangaroo Caught
46. Havin' a Ball
47. A Choice of Voice
48. The Pale Inhale
49. Down the Hatch
50. Cricket High
51. Detour for Sure
52. Once Around Please
53. The Vast Mast
54. The Treasure Measure
55. Not So Hot Knot
56. The Big Top Stop
57. Monkey See
58. Big Shot
59. A Ticklish Situation
60. Clowning Around
61. Stroll Around the Pole
62. The Bear Facts
63. Something's Fishy
64. Fast Talk
65. Snow Use
66. The Highway Man
67. To Track a Thief
68. Sleep Watcher
69. A Dog's Best Friend
70. Thrown by the Throne
71. The Cast Offs
72. Mutiny on the Clipper
73. Floundering Around
74. The Litterbugs
75. Atlantis City
76. Steed Stallion
77. Chief Big Cheese
78. The Water Boy
79. The Little Train Robbery
80. Simon Says
81. Sky Spy
82. Glockenspiel's Spiel
83. The Gas Man Cometh
84. The Impatient Patient
85. The Astronuts
86. Special Delivery
87. Go Fly a Kite
88. Marooned
89. The Foot Print
90. Homeward Bound
91. Wish Wish and Away
92. Lead on Leprechaun
93. Westward Whoa
94. TV Time
95. Baby Big
96. Follow That Horse
97. Stage West
98. Draw Pardner
99. The Race
100. The Gold Bug
101. Away with the Wind
102. The Hard Sell
103. The Witch Switch
104. Sky High
105. Romeo Fibble
106. Wanted
107. Going Down
108. Under Ground Found
109. The Gold Bird
110. The Big Heist
111. Willy Wiggly
112. Substitute
113. Borschtville
114. A Fair Trail
115. The Rescue Rock
116. Writers in the Sky
117. The Zany Zombies
118. Sleep Head
119. The Boss Who Came to Dinner
120. Witch Switch
121. Witching You Well
122. Candy Land
123. Aw Fudge
124. The Phoney Fairy
125. The Fastest Wind
126. Willy Nilly
127. Hog Bellows
128. An Ace in the Hole
129. Rosco Romp
130. Lady Barber
