= Paul Soles =

Canadian actor (1930–2021)

- Born: Paul Robert Soles; August 11, 1930; Toronto, Ontario, Canada
- Died: May 26, 2021 (aged 90); Toronto, Ontario, Canada
- Occupations: Actor; television personality
- Years active: 1953–2021

Paul Robert Soles (August 11, 1930 – May 26, 2021) was a Canadian actor and television personality. He notably voiced the title character in the 1967 Spider-Man television series and Hermey in the 1964 Rudolph the Red-Nosed Reindeer television special. Soles was one of the last surviving participants of the special's voice cast.

Soles' first screen appearance was on CFPL in 1953, and he continued to perform over 60 years later, performing in the comedy web series My 90-Year-Old Roommate on the Canadian Broadcasting Corporation's online comedy channel, CBC Comedy, as of 2016.

== Early life ==
Soles was born in Toronto, the son of Lillian (Goodfellow) and Arthur L. Soles. His family were Jewish emigrants from Poland and Lithuania. He had two siblings.

Soles is the cousin of Bernard "Bunny" Cowan, and they both worked on the original 1960s Spider-Man animated series and the 1967 children's series Max, the 2000-Year-Old Mouse.

== Career ==
=== Acting roles ===
Soles was the voice of Hermey the Misfit Elf in Rankin/Bass' Rudolph the Red-Nosed Reindeer from 1964. He also voiced Marvel superhero Spider-Man and various characters in the original animated television series also from the 1960s, and he played "The Lawbreaker" on the CBC panel quiz show This Is the Law in the 1970s, and played Costas Stavros on the Canadian soap opera Riverdale. In 2001, Soles took over the role of Shylock the Jew in the Stratford Festival of Canada production of The Merchant of Venice after Al Waxman, who was originally scheduled to play the part, died. Soles played Stanley the pizza shop owner in The Incredible Hulk (2008) having earlier voiced characters in the 1966 TV animated series The Marvel Super Heroes, and his other film appearances have included roles in Ticket to Heaven (1981), Just the Way You Are (1984) and The Gunrunner (1989) opposite Kevin Costner. He also played Danny, the Montreal Customs House janitor in the 2001 crime thriller The Score.

Soles won a 2006 Gemini Award for his role in the television series Terminal City, and a 2017 Canadian Screen Award for Best Performance by an Actor in a Digital Production for My 90-Year-Old Roommate. On the appointed evening of the awards ceremony, the ever-humble Soles was so overcome with emotion that he had to contain himself more than once on the way to the stage, resulting in another thunderous applause from the audience, before he accepted the trophy and gave his speech.

=== Voice work ===
Soles also did voices on various animated television shows and films such as Rudolph the Red-Nosed Reindeer, Rocket Robin Hood, The Smokey Bear Show, The Little Brown Burro, King of the Beasts, The Marvel Super Heroes, the original Spider-Man cartoon, The Trolls and the Christmas Express, Take Me Up to the Ball Game, Willy McBean and His Magic Machine, Festival of Family Classics, JoJo's Circus, The Reluctant Dragon & Mr. Toad Show, Noah's Animals, Iron Man, The King Kong Show, and Spider-Woman.

Soles was also the narrator of The Wonderful Stories of Professor Kitzel, the voice of The Commissioner in the 2005 animated television series Funpak and has also supplied the voice of Dr. Reboux in the 2005 animated film version of the Johanna Spyri novel Heidi.

Soles also voiced the Academy Award-nominated animated documentary The Colours of My Father: A Portrait of Sam Borenstein.

In 2011, Soles started voicing the recurring character Maxwell Finnwich on Detentionaire and he voiced a character, Barnabas Dinklelot, in the 2017-2018 animated series, Mysticons.

=== Television hosting ===
He was the host of the short-lived CBC Television late-night comedy talk show Canada After Dark, and co-hosted the public affairs show Take 30 for 18 seasons with hosts such as Anna Cameron and Adrienne Clarkson. He also hosted the CFPL television game show Take Your Choice for one year in the early 1960s.

=== Documentary producer ===
Paul Soles was also a producer of documentaries while he was an on-air talent at CFPL-TV in London, Ontario. He worked on a series called, The World Around Us, and travelled with film crews in Great Britain in the early 1960s, filming many aspects of British life. He even got on a soap-box in Hyde Park in London to speak his mind. Soles has worked with people like Dennis Goulden (a long-time documentarian who still produces television specials in the States) and Jim Plant and Tom Ashwell and Jon Boynton.

== Death ==
Soles died of natural causes in his sleep at his home in Toronto, Ontario, on May 26, 2021, at the age of 90.

== Accolades ==
=== Gemini Awards ===
- 2006 - Terminal City - Best Performance by an Actor in a Featured Supporting Role in a Dramatic Series - Winner

== Filmography ==
=== Film ===
Year	Title	Role	Notes
1965	Willy McBean and His Magic Machine	Pablo the Monkey, King Ferdinand (voice)	
1981	Ticket to Heaven	Morley	
1983	The Magic Show	Manny	
1983	The Gunrunner	Leobman	
1984	Just the Way You Are	Arthur Berlanger	
1987	The Last Straw		
1990	Falling Over Backwards	Harvey	
1991	A Star for Two		
1992	Beethoven Lives Upstairs	Mr. Schindler	
1993	The Lotus Eaters	Tobias Spittle	
1994	Trial by Jury	Mr. Kriegsberg, Juror	
1998	Shadow Builder	Mr. Butterman	
1999	Teen Knight	Mr. Percy, Perceval	
1999	Hidden Agenda	Wilhelm Engelmann	
1999	The Five Senses	Mr. Bernstein	
2001	The Score	Danny	
2004	Siblings	Grandpa	
2005	Heidi	Doctor Reboux (voice)	
2006	My First Wedding	Harry	
2008	Adoration	Passenger, Professor On-Line	
2008	The Incredible Hulk	Stanley	
2016	The Second Time Around	Marvin	Final film role

=== Television ===
Year	Title	Role	Notes
1964	Rudolph the Red-Nosed Reindeer	Hermey (voice)	Stop-motion TV special
1966	Charlie Had One But He Didn't Like It, So He Gave It To Us	Himself	
1967–1970	Spider-Man	Peter Parker / Spider-Man, Vulture, Fantastic Fakir, Ox, Vulture, Attendant, Police officer, Guard, Fozwell, Henchman, Mr. Thompson, Bob, Dean Wilkins, Man, Man at control panel, Bomber pilot, Borer, Black Dog One, News reporter, Dr. Irving Caldwell, Tom, Reptilla, Dr. Curtis Conner, Prison guard, Thug #2 (voice)	
1967–1992	Max, the 2000-Year-Old Mouse	Max (voice)	
1979	Spider-Woman	Peter Parker / Spider-Man	Guest star; 2 episodes
1986	Really Weird Tales	Professor Tistaert	Episode: "I'll Die Loving"
1988	Family Reunion	Morris	

Preceded by None	Voice of Spider-Man; 1967–1970	Succeeded by Ted Schwartz
