= Arthur Rankin Jr. =

American director, writer and producer (1924–2014)

- Born: Arthur Gardner Rankin Jr. July 19, 1924; Baltimore, Maryland, U.S.
- Died: January 30, 2014 (aged 89); Harrington Sound, Bermuda
- Occupations: Director; producer; writer
- Years active: 1940s–1999
- Known for: Rankin/Bass Animated Entertainment
- Spouses: Elizabeth Shuldiner (m. 1947, divorced) Olga Karlatos (m. 1983)
- Children: 2
- Father: Arthur Rankin
- Relatives: Harry Davenport (grandfather); Phyllis Rankin (grandmother); Sidney Rankin Drew (first cousin once removed)

Signature
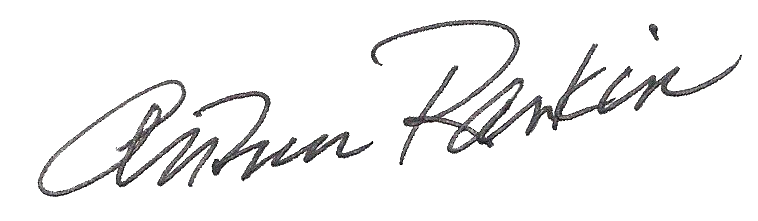

Arthur Gardner Rankin Jr. (July 19, 1924 – January 30, 2014) was an American director, producer and screenwriter, who mostly worked in animation. Co-creator of Rankin/Bass Productions with his friend Jules Bass, he created stop-motion and traditional animation features such as Rudolph the Red-Nosed Reindeer, Frosty the Snowman, Santa Claus Is Comin' to Town, and the 1977 cartoon special of The Hobbit. He is credited on over 1,000 television programs.

== Early life ==
Rankin was born in Baltimore, the son of actors Arthur Rankin and Marian Mansfield. His paternal grandmother was actress Phyllis Rankin, and his paternal step-grandfather, who adopted his father, was actor Harry Davenport, who played Dr. Meade in the film Gone with the Wind.

== Career ==
Rankin began his career as an art director for the American Broadcasting Company in the 1940s. In 1955, he and Jules Bass formed the production company Videocraft International to produce television commercials. In 1960, they moved into the area of animation, and in 1968, changed the name of their company to Rankin/Bass Productions. The two worked closely together for many years, co-directing and producing a wide array of stop motion animated features and cartoons, which Rankin had referred to as "Animagic".

In addition to directing, Rankin primarily created the script and sketched the character concepts, which would be made into the wooden puppets by Japanese artists, including head supervisor and partner, Tadahito Mochinaga. Maury Laws, a musical director for Rankin/Bass, stated that Rankin was inspired by the film King Kong, and that Rankin "wanted every detail right" in creating these shorts. Some of the most famous features were the holiday-themed TV specials, such as Willy McBean and His Magic Machine, Rudolph the Red-Nosed Reindeer, Santa Claus Is Comin' to Town, Rudolph's Shiny New Year, The Year Without a Santa Claus, Frosty the Snowman, 'Twas the Night Before Christmas, and Jack Frost. Many of these holiday-themed works are now considered "perennial favorites", according to The New York Times. He is also credited with devising the story for many Rankin/Bass productions, including the feature films The Daydreamer and Mad Monster Party?.

In 1977, Rankin and Bass produced a version of J. R. R. Tolkien's The Hobbit, for which they were awarded the Peabody Award. The pair also teamed on a wide variety of animated TV series, including ThunderCats and SilverHawks. The pair last teamed on the 1987 TV special based on The Wind in the Willows. Rankin's last producing credit was on the 1999 animated version of The King and I.

== Later life ==
Rankin had two sons with his first wife Elizabeth Deland: Arthur Gardner Rankin III, and his brother Todd Rankin.

Rankin met his wife-to-be, Olga Karlatos, after he cast her in a 1983 television adaption of The Picture of Dorian Gray entitled The Sins of Dorian Gray. They settled in Bermuda, with Rankin looking to continue to produce stage shows. He noted:

"I could go up to Broadway and run up and down the street and scream, 'I want to write and direct a play!' They'd put me in the nuthouse. If I say that [in Bermuda], everyone springs into action, 'Oh, please, please.'"

In addition to this, Rankin also taught courses on film and entertainment at Bermuda College.

== Death ==
Rankin died after a brief illness on January 30, 2014, aged 89, in his home at Harrington Sound, Bermuda. Referring to him as an "animation legend", The Hollywood Reporter noted that during his career, Rankin worked with actors such as Jeff Bridges, Mia Farrow, Angela Lansbury, Alan Arkin, Danny Kaye, James Cagney, Fred Astaire, Boris Karloff, Tallulah Bankhead, George Burns, John Huston, Burl Ives, James Earl Jones, Christopher Lee, Walter Matthau, Vincent Price, and Flip Wilson. He was entombed in Sunnyside, Bermuda's Holy Trinity Church Cemetery within its garden mausoleum.

== Filmography ==
Rankin was credited on over 1,000 TV shows and films. Some selected works include:

=== Animated feature films ===
- Willy McBean and His Magic Machine (1965)
- Mad Monster Party? (1967)
- The Hobbit (1977) (TV movie)
- The Return of the King (1980) (TV movie)
- The Last Unicorn (1982)
- The Flight of Dragons (1982) (TV movie)
- The Wind in the Willows (1987) (TV movie)
- The King and I (1999)

=== Live-action ===
- King Kong Escapes (1968)
- Marco (1973)
- The Last Dinosaur (1977)
- The Bermuda Depths (1977) (TV movie)
- The Ivory Ape (1980)
- The Bushido Blade (1981)

=== Animated TV specials ===
- Return to Oz (1964) (produced as Videocraft)
- Rudolph the Red-Nosed Reindeer (1964, Burl Ives) (produced as Videocraft)
- The Edgar Bergen & Charlie McCarthy Show (1965)
- The Ballad of Smokey the Bear (1966, James Cagney)
- Cricket on the Hearth (1967, Danny Thomas)
- The Mouse on the Mayflower (1968, Tennessee Ernie Ford, Eddie Albert, Jack Cassidy, Joanie Sommers)
- The Little Drummer Boy (1968, José Ferrer, Greer Garson)
- Frosty the Snowman (1969, Jimmy Durante)
- Santa Claus is Comin' to Town (1970, Fred Astaire, Mickey Rooney)
- Here Comes Peter Cottontail (1971, Danny Kaye)
- The Enchanted World of Danny Kaye: The Emperor's New Clothes (1972, Danny Kaye)
- Puss in Boots (1972 TV special)
- The Year Without a Santa Claus (1974, Shirley Booth)
- 'Twas the Night Before Christmas (1974, Joel Grey, George Gobel)
- Frosty's Winter Wonderland (1976, Andy Griffith)
- Rudolph's Shiny New Year (1976, Red Skelton)
- Jack Frost (1979, Buddy Hackett)
- The Leprechauns' Christmas Gold (1981, Art Carney)

=== Animated series ===
- The New Adventures of Pinocchio (1960)
- Tales of the Wizard of Oz (1961)
- The King Kong Show (1966–1969)
- The Tomfoolery Show (1970–71)
- The Reluctant Dragon & Mr. Toad Show (1970)
- The Jackson 5ive (1971)
- The Osmonds (1972)
- Festival of Family Classics (1972–1973)
- Kid Power (1972–1973)
- ThunderCats (1985–1987)
- SilverHawks (1986)
- TigerSharks (1987)
