= Return to Oz (TV special) =

1964 animated TV special

- Genre: Animation, Family, Musical
- Based on: The Wonderful Wizard of Oz by L. Frank Baum
- Written by: Romeo Muller
- Directed by: F. R. Crawley; Thomas Glynn; Larry Roemer
- Voices of: Carl Banas; Susan Conway; Peggi Loder; Susan Morse; Larry D. Mann; Alfie Scopp
- Music by: Gene Forrell; Edward Thomas; James Polack
- Countries of origin: Canada; United States
- Original language: English

Production
- Producer: Arthur Rankin Jr.
- Cinematography: Bill Clark; Ron Haines; Gary Morgan
- Running time: 51 minutes
- Production companies: Videocraft International; Crawley Films

Original release
- Network: NBC
- Release: February 9, 1964

Return to Oz is a 1964 animated television special produced by Crawley Films for Videocraft International. Aired February 9, 1964 in the United States as the first of three The General Electric Fantasy Hour specials for NBC, it was rebroadcast on February 21, 1965. The special was directed by F. R. Crawley, Thomas Glynn, and Larry Roemer from a teleplay by Romeo Muller, who later wrote Dorothy in the Land of Oz. It was the first television special produced by Arthur Rankin Jr. and Jules Bass through Videocraft International, later known as Rankin/Bass Productions.

Crawley Films had previously produced the 1961 animated series Tales of the Wizard of Oz and brought similar artistic character renditions to the subsequent special. In the plot, Dorothy and Toto arrive back in Oz, learning that the Wicked Witch of the West has been restored back to life, casting dark spells, kidnapping the Wizard, and plotting revenge on Dorothy. Along with the support of her Oz pals, Dorothy and Toto embark on a journey to rid Oz of the Wicked Witch for good.

== Plot ==
The plot is virtually a retelling of the storyline of The Wonderful Wizard of Oz; however, as this is a sequel to the animated series Tales of the Wizard of Oz, in which Dorothy and the gang went through an entirely different series of adventures, this adventure is new to them all. All of Dorothy's friends become trapped in the situations they were in when she first met them, meaning that they all must visit the Wizard as they did in the pilot for the TV series. Dorothy receives a letter from the Scarecrow, called Socrates in the special, as in the series, telling her that everyone is happy with the gifts the Wizard gave them and that they miss her very much. She goes to find her magic Silver Shoes and is instantly taken back to Oz again by another Kansas twister, this time not by house, but an apple tree. Once she arrives there, she is greeted by the Munchkins in Munchkinville. Glinda arrives to tell her that the previously melted Wicked Witch of the West has become reconstituted and is wreaking havoc again, having taken Socrates' diploma and burned it, destroyed the heart of the Tin Woodman, called Rusty, by turning herself into a Tin Woman, and dropping him into a pond where he rusted over again. She has also stolen the medal that belonged to the Cowardly Lion, called Dandy, and turned it into a daisy, and is planning to get Dorothy's silver shoes again. Glinda warns Dorothy that the silver slippers will only protect her and turn the heartless, brainless, and cowardly into solid stone.

Dorothy sets off to find her friends, without knowing the Wicked Witch is watching them in her Crystal Ball. She finds and oils Rusty who has rusted after the Witch tricked him. They find Socrates in a cornfield on a pole scaring crows again and get him down. They find Dandy weeping, and after some unexpectedly cruel bullying from Socrates and Rusty, they cheer him up. After the four friends are reunited, they arrive at the Emerald City, only to be tricked by the Witch, who has captured the Wizard and taken over as the ruler of Oz. The Wizard, who in this continuity is not an Omaha huckster but an Ozite born and bred and the elected ruler of Oz, tells them to destroy her again and he will give them what they want. She arrives back at her castle just before Dorothy and her friends, but before they arrive she sends flying alligators to kill them. Socrates' quick thinking saves them as they hide under his straw (a method employed in more than one of the Oz books). Rusty saves them from a lightning bolt by sacrificing himself, which kills him, despite his being made of tin. Dorothy asks Glinda if she will help and a glowing ball brings him back to life. They arrive and are trapped by the Witch. She grabs Dorothy and tries to take her silver slippers. The gang (including the Wizard himself) tries to get her back from the Witch, who gives her and Dandy the slippers. Dorothy, who is being held upside-down from the window, tells Dandy that he will turn to stone if he takes them, but he takes them anyway without being turned to stone. The Witch takes them only to be turned into stone, crumble, and fall apart. The gang returns to the Emerald City, only to find out that the Wizard is, after all, a humbug, unable as he always was to return Dorothy home. Glinda appears to tell Dorothy the reason that her friends didn't turn to stone, because they had brains, a heart, and courage. She also explains that the Witch was cruel and heartless, brainless enough to think that evil could conquer good and cowardly in that she used slaves and suppressed others. Dorothy wishes to go back, and instantly, a Kansas twister whisks her and Toto back home to Aunt Em and Uncle Henry again.

== Characters ==
The following characters appear in the special, with associated voice actors:

- Dandy Lion (Cowardly Lion) and The Wizard of Oz – Carl Banas
- Dorothy Gale – Susan Conway
  - Dorothy Gale (singing) – Susan Morse(not to be confused with the film editor of the same name)
- Glinda, the Good Witch of the North – Peggi Loder
- Rusty the Tin Man (Tin Woodman) and The Wicked Witch of the West – Larry D. Mann
- Socrates the Strawman (Scarecrow) – Alfie Scopp
- Toto – Stan Francis

== Production ==
The special was produced by Crawley Films for Videocraft International, later known as Rankin/Bass Productions. It was the first television special produced by Arthur Rankin Jr. and Jules Bass. Directed by F. R. Crawley, Thomas Glynn, and Larry Roemer from a teleplay by Romeo Muller, it premiered on NBC on February 9, 1964, as the first of three General Electric Fantasy Hour specials.

Return to Oz was produced as a 90-minute successor to the Tales of the Wizard of Oz series, although edited to fit an hour-long time slot for NBC's broadcast. The screenplay originated from New York while the voice track was recorded in Toronto at RCA Victor studios. The animation consisted of 140,000 images drawn by 40 staff members at the Crawley studios in Canada.

== Home media ==
Return to Oz was released on VHS in the late 1980s by Prism Entertainment. It was released on DVD by Sony Wonder and Classic Media in March 2006. It had previously been available for syndication, and a few local stations picked it up.

== See also ==
- List of American films of 1964
- Adaptations of The Wizard of Oz – other adaptations of The Wonderful Wizard of Oz
