= Tadahito Mochinaga =

Japanese animator (1919–1999)

- Born: March 3, 1919; Nishikichō, Tokyo, Empire of Japan
- Died: April 1, 1999 (aged 80); Tokyo, Japan
- Occupation: Animator
- Years active: 1938–1992

Tadahito "Tad" Mochinaga (持永 只仁, Mochinaga Tadahito; March 3, 1919 – April 1, 1999) was a pioneer Japanese stop-motion animator. Having done many stop motion films in Japan, he is best known as the animator for Rankin/Bass' "Animagic" productions at his MOM Production Studio in Tokyo throughout the 1960s. He did this work in association with American director Arthur Rankin, Jr. who wrote and designed the productions before sending them to Japan for animation.

In 1945, Mochinaga traveled to Xinjing in the Japanese puppet state of Manchukuo set up in occupied China, to work at the Manchukuo Film Association. He stayed in China after the war and from 1950, he spent three years in Shanghai working on such films as Thank You, Kitty. He is perhaps the only major artist of the era to have worked in both the Chinese and Japanese animation industries.

== Biography ==
Mochinaga began his animation career in the middle of WWII Japan. During this time, he was the assistant of Mitsuyo Seo on Momotarō's Sea Eagles, an animated propaganda film depicting the bombing of Pearl Harbor. Mochinaga was officially in charge of backgrounds and visual effects. Most Japanese children at this time were taken on official school trips to watch the film. Mochinaga was not particularly happy about this. He wrote in his memoirs:

"I heard that many youths volunteered for the flying corps and that while they were on duty they died on air raids. I wonder whether the film we made influenced their decision to volunteer... I thought, in the future I only wished to make a film that would benefit the young, difficult though that might be."

Shortly after the release of Momotarō's Sea Eagles, Mochinaga was put in charge of Fuku-Chan's Submarine despite his own protests that he was too inexperienced. Due to the fact that much of his staff was drafted to the military and lack of supplies and funds, Fuku-Chan's Submarine was barely finished and released in 1944.

Exhausted, Mochinaga returned home to find it destroyed in a bombing raid. Foreseeing the end of the war and fearing the inevitable American occupation of Japan that might involve purging propagandists as well as food shortages, Mochinaga fled with his pregnant wife to Japan-occupied Manchuria where they both had family. There, he got a job at Man-Ei as a graphic artist. Less than a month after moving to Manchuria, Japan surrendered.

Fearing what would happen now that the Japanese army had fled, the Japanese workers attempted to flee but were captured by the Soviet army. Fortunately for Mochinaga, he was rehired at the now rebranded Northeast Film Studio. While there, he was given papers identifying him as a Chinese film worker and the Soviets did not seem to consider that a Japanese National could be a film worker in China. He was then given the job of subtitling Soviet films for Chinese, Korean, and Japanese markets. While there, he was able to pull other Japanese refugees into the company and get them work, including Oshiro Noboru.

Mochinaga soon found himself in another war zone as the Chinese National and Communist armies battled for dominance over Manchuria. After he and his staff were captured trying to flee to Hao Gang, he had to confess to being Japanese. However, lucky for him, he happened to be captured by the Eighth Route Army, a Prisoner of War-friendly organization.

In 1946, the frontline of China's Civil War moved further south, allowing Japanese nationals to finally return home. However, Mochinaga chose to stay. There, he avoided censorship by concentration on map graphics and subtitles. During this time, there was only an estimated 20,000 feet of unexposed film left in China. Mochinaga (and all Chinese filmmakers at the time) had to be very careful with the amount of film they used. Mochinaga was forced to mix his own homemade paints from what he could scavenge.

Mochinaga was assigned the task of animating a propaganda comic drawn by Hua Junwu. In order to save the paints, he built puppets and to save film, he shot it frame-by-frame instead of live. This was a resounding success as many in the region fondly remembered going to puppet shows. Thus, Mochinaga accidentally popularized stop motion in China.

Mochinaga continued to work as a successful animator and filmmaker in China for the next decade, finally returning to his home country in 1954, four years before the massive famines in 1958.

== Filmography ==
- Arichan (1941) (Animator)
- Momotarō's Sea Eagles (1943) (Animator)
- Fuku-chan's Submarine (1944) (Cinematographer)
- Horoniga-kun to Mitsuko-san (1953) (Director)
- Beer Mukashi Mukashi (1956) (Puppet Manipulator)
- Chibikuro Sambo no Tora Taiji (1956) (Director)
- Gohiki no Kozaru-tachi (1956) (Director)
- Uriko-hime to Amanojaku (1956) (Director)
- Kobutori (1957) (Director)
- Chibikuro Sambo to Futago no Otōto (1957) (Director)
- Shōnen to Kodanuki (1992) (Director)

=== Rankin/Bass Productions ===
- The New Adventures of Pinocchio (1960–1961) (Animation Director/Supervisor)
- Rudolph the Red-Nosed Reindeer (1964) (Animation Supervisor)
- Willy McBean and his Magic Machine (1965) (Animation Supervisor)
- The Daydreamer (1966) ("Animagic" Technician)
- Ballad of Smokey the Bear (1966) ("Animagic" Technician)
- Mad Monster Party? (1967) ("Animagic" Technician)

== See also ==
- History of Chinese animation

== Bibliography ==
- Mochinaga, Tadahito (2006). Animēshon Nitchū kōryūki: Mochinaga Tadahito jiden. Tokyo: Tōhō Shoten. ISBN 978-4-497-20606-0.
- Du, Daisy Yan (2012). "Mochinaga Tadahito and Animated Filmmaking in Postwar China, 1945-1953," in On the Move: The Trans/national Animated Film in 1940s-1970s China. Madison: University of Wisconsin.
- Clements, Jonathan (2016). "3". Anime: A History. London: Palgrave. pp. 62–72. ISBN 978-1-84457-390-5.
