= The King Kong Show =

Japanese-American-Canadian animated series

- Title card
- Also known as: King Kong

Japanese name
- Kanji: キングコング⅐親指トム
Transcriptions
- Revised Hepburn: Kingu Kongu 00 1/7 Oyayubi Tomu
- Genre: Science fiction comedy Kaiju
- Based on: King Kong by Merian C. Cooper
- Directed by: Yugo Serikawa
- Voices of: Carl Banas; Susan Conway; John Drainie; Billie Mae Richards; Alf Scopp; Paul Soles; Bernard Cowan
- Theme music composer: Maury Laws
- Countries of origin: United States; Canada; Japan
- Original languages: English; Japanese
- No. of seasons: 1
- No. of episodes: 25

Production
- Executive producers: Arthur Rankin Jr. Jules Bass
- Producers: William J. Keenan; Larry Roemer
- Running time: 28 minutes (regular episodes); 56 minutes (special episode)
- Production companies: Videocraft International; Animation: Toei Animation

Original release
- Network: ABC (United States); NET (Japan)
- Release: September 6, 1966 – March 4, 1967

King Kong (キングコング⅐親指トム, Kingu Kongu 00 1/7 Oyayubi Tomu), commonly referred to as The King Kong Show, is an American anime-based animated television series produced by Videocraft International and Toei Animation. ABC ran the series in the United States on Saturday mornings between September 6, 1966 and March 4, 1967, though it continued in reruns until August 31, 1969. It is the first animated series produced in Japan for an American company (not counting Rankin/Bass' previous Animagic stop motion productions, which were also animated in Japan), making it an early example of an anime-based work.

This series is an animated adaptation of the famous film monster King Kong with character designs by Jack Davis and Rod Willis. It is also the first animated series in the King Kong franchise.

== Segments ==
=== King Kong ===
Title card for the King Kong segment of the series

In this segment, the giant ape named Kong befriends the Bond family, with whom he has various adventures, fighting monsters, robots, aliens, mad scientists like Doctor Who, and other threats. Unlike his counterpart from the original 1933 film, Kong is a protector of humanity.

=== Tom of T.H.U.M.B. ===
Title card for the Tom of T.H.U.M.B. segment of the series

A parody of spy films of the 1960s called Tom of T.H.U.M.B. (based on the character in English folklore 'Tom Thumb'), about a secret agent for T.H.U.M.B. (short for Tiny Human Underground Military Bureau) named Tom and his Asian sidekick Swinging Jack, who are accidentally reduced by a shrinking laser ray gun to 3 in (76 mm) tall. The pair are sent out in a variety of miniature vehicles by their bad-tempered boss Chief Homer J. Chief to foil the fiendish plots of M.A.D. (short for Maladjusted, Anti-social and Darn mean), an evil organization made up of black-hatted and black-cloaked scientists "bent on destroying the world for their own gains".

== Characters ==
- King Kong is the titular giant ape. Kong was discovered on Mondo Island (sometimes known as Skull Island) by Bobby Bond, whom he saved from being eaten by a Tyrannosaurus rex. He saved Bond family from other disasters afterward. Since then, he has become the family's mascot and a hero.
- Professor Carl Bond (voiced by Bernard Cowan) is a scientist and archeologist, as well as the single father of the Bond family. He is the basis for Rhodes Reason's character Commander Carl Nelson in King Kong Escapes.
- Susan Bond (voiced by Susan Conway) is Carl's teenage daughter. She is somewhat perplexed by Bobby and Kong's friendship and always the one that knows what Doctor Who is up to, and is the more responsible child in the family, frequently seen cooking and cleaning in the island. Her fear is dreaming about snakes. She is the basis for Linda Jo Miller's character Susan Watson in King Kong Escapes.
- Bobby Bond (voiced by Billie Mae Richards) is Carl's young son and Kong's closest companion. Bobby is saved by Kong from being eaten by a Tyrannosaurus rex and they are friends since then.
- Captain Englehorn (voiced by Carl Banas) is Carl's ship captain and a friend to the family. He is based on the character of the same name from the original 1933 King Kong film and its sequel.
- Doctor Who (voiced by Paul Soles) is a bald, big-headed, and bespectacled mad scientist who wants to capture Kong and use him for his own evil schemes. Despite his name, he has no relation to Doctor Who. He is the basis for Hideyo Amamoto's character of the same name in King Kong Escapes.
  - Mechani-Kong is a mecha modeled after Kong, invented by Who, who operates it via a control room in the mecha's head. Neither the Bonds nor Englehorn ever knows (or even figure out) that Who invented it. It appears in two King Kong segments, "MechaniKong" (the second King Kong segment from episode 10) and "Anchors Away" (the second King Kong segment from episode 25). Each segment features a different version of Mechani-Kong. It is also Kong's archenemy in King Kong Escapes.

== Crew ==
- Producer – William J. Keenan
- Executive Producers – Arthur Rankin Jr., Jules Bass
- Associate Producer – Larry Roemer
- Music/Lyrics – Maury Laws, Jules Bass
- Recording Supervisor – Bernard Cowan
- Sound/Effects – Bill Giles, Stephen Frohock, Bill Dowding, Frederick Tudor
- Animation Production – Toei Studios
- Character Designs – Jack Davis, Rod Willis
- Animation Continuity – Don Duga
- Story Editor – Cherney Berg

== List of episodes ==
Starting with the second episode, each episode begins with a six-minute King Kong segment, followed by a six-minute Tom of T.H.U.M.B. segment, and then a second six-minute King Kong segment.

1. "King Kong" (December 31, 1966; 56-minute long pilot episode). In American syndication, the episode was split into two parts, which were titled "A Friend in Need" and "The Key to the City".
2. "Under the Volcano" / "For the Last Time, Feller...I'm Not Bait!" / "The Treasure Trap"
3. "The Horror of Mondo Island" / "Hey, That Was A Close One World!" / "Dr. Who"
4. "Rocket Island" / "I Was A 9 1/2 oz. Weakling 'Till One Day..." / "The African Bees"
5. "The Hunter" / "I Was A Starling for the USA!" / "The Space Men"
6. "The Jinx of the Sphinx" / "Cool Nerves and...Steady Hands" / "The Greeneyed Monster"
7. "The Top of the World" / "All Guys from Outer Space are Creeps" / "The Golden Temple"
8. "The Electric Circle" / "Mechanical Granma" / "Mirror of Destruction"
9. "Tiger Tiger" / "The Day We Almost Had It" / "The Vise of Dr. Who"
10. "King Kong's House" / "Tom Makes History" / "MechaniKong"
11. "The Giant Sloths" / "Tom Scores Again" / "The Legend of Loch Ness"
12. "Dr. Bone" / "Blow, Jack, Blow!" / "No Man's Snowman"
13. "The Desert Pirates" / "Tom and the TV Pirates" / "Command Performance"
14. "The Sea Surrounds Us" / "The Girl from M.A.D." / "Show Biz"
15. "The Wizard of Overlord" / "Just One of Those Nights" / "Perilous Porpoise"
16. "The Trojan Horse" / "Runt of 1,000 Faces" / "The Man from K.O.N.G."
17. "Caribbean Cruise" / "Hello, Dollies!" / "Diver's Dilemma"
18. "The Great Sun Spots" / "Pardner" / "Kong is Missing"
19. "In the Land of the Giant Trees" / "Beans is Beans" / "Captain Kong"
20. "Statue of Liberty Play" / "What Goes Up..." / "Pandora's Box"
21. "Thousand Year Knockout" / "Our Man, the Monster" / "Desert City"
22. "Eagle Squadron" / "Never Trust A Clam" / "The Kong of Stone"
23. "Murderer's Maze" / "Drop that Ocean, Feller" / "The Great Gold Strike"
24. "It Wasn't There Again Today" / "Plug that Leak" / "The Mad Whale"
25. "King Kong Diamond" / "The Scooby" / "Anchors Away"

== Music ==
The theme music for the series was recorded in London, England, in 1965, using primarily British studio musicians. Canadian conductor, vocalist and former Kitchener-Waterloo Record entertainment columnist Harry Currie provided vocal talent on the recording.

== Release ==
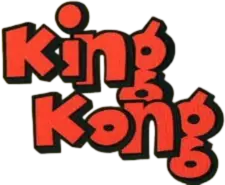
Wordmark that appeared on the show's brochures and various merchandise

In Japan, the first two episodes were combined into a 56-minute special, titled King of the World: The King Kong Show (世界の王者 キングコング大会, Sekai no Ōja: Kingu Kongu Taikai), and was broadcast on NET (now TV Asahi) on December 31, 1966. The rest of the series, with the inclusion of Tom of T.H.U.M.B., was broadcast on NET as King Kong & 00 1/7 Tom Thumb (キングコング00 1/7親指トム, Kingu Kongu 00 1/7 Oyayubi Tomu), and aired from April 5 to October 4, 1967, with a total of 25 episodes.

On November 15, 2005, Sony Wonder released the first eight episodes (two King Kong cartoons separated by a Tom of T.H.U.M.B. cartoon) on two DVD releases titled King Kong: The Animated Series Volume 1 and King Kong: The Animated Series Volume 2. The pilot episode was included, in its two parts for American syndication, between the two DVDs.

== Reception ==
In the 2007 book Comics Gone Ape! The Missing Link to Primates in Comics, comics historian Michael Eury writes: "The Rankin/Bass King Kong was an early case of identity theft, where the Kong name was appropriated (fully under license) to describe a new character that, at best, only remotely resembled his namesake. This was Kong done wrong".

== Legacy ==
This series was successful enough for Rankin/Bass to extend the Kong franchise to another Japanese company, Toho (which had already produced the hit film King Kong vs. Godzilla in 1962). This resulted in two films: Ebirah, Horror of the Deep (originally intended to be a Kong film, with Godzilla exhibiting some of Kong's traits) and King Kong Escapes, which was based on The King Kong Show.
