= Jules Bass =

American director, producer and composer (1935–2022)

- Born: Julius Caesar Bass; September 16, 1935; Philadelphia, Pennsylvania, U.S.
- Died: October 25, 2022 (aged 87); Rye, New York, U.S.
- Resting place: Wellwood Cemetery, West Babylon, New York, U.S.
- Occupations: Director; producer; lyricist; author
- Years active: 1955–2020
- Known for: Co-founder of Rankin/Bass Animated Entertainment
- Notable work: Mad Monster Party? The Little Drummer Boy; Frosty the Snowman; Santa Claus Is Comin' to Town; Here Comes Peter Cottontail; The Year Without a Santa Claus; The Hobbit; Jack Frost; The Return of the King; Rudolph the Red-Nosed Reindeer
- Spouse(s): Renee Fisherman (divorced), Sylvia Bass (divorced)
- Children: 1
- Parent(s): Max Bass, Bernice Palat Bass
- Relatives: Julius Palat

Julius Caesar Bass (September 16, 1935 - October 25, 2022) was an American director, producer, lyricist, composer and author. Until 1960, he worked at a New York advertising agency, and then co-founded the film production company Videocraft International, later named Rankin/Bass Productions, with his friend, Arthur Rankin Jr. He joined ASCAP in 1963 and collaborated with Edward Thomas and James Polack at their music firm and as a songwriting team primarily with Maury Laws at Rankin/Bass.

== Early life ==
Bass was born in Philadelphia on September 16, 1935 to Max Bass and Bernice Bertha Palat Bass, and grew up with his younger brother, Howard Bass During his teenage years, he caught scarlet fever and nearly lost his life to the disease. He attended New York University before being employed by an advertising agency.

== Career ==
Bass started working with Arthur Rankin Jr. at the American Broadcasting Company in 1955. Rankin was an art director and Bass was a copywriter. The pair initially made television commercials, before moving onto television series and movies when they established Videocraft International in 1960. They released their first syndicated television series, The New Adventures of Pinocchio the same year, animated in stop-motion. In 1961, Videocraft produced a cel-animated series called Tales of the Wizard of Oz, which was expanded into their first prime-time network special, Return to Oz, on NBC in 1963.

The following year in 1964, they produced the long-running stop-motion special Rudolph the Red-Nosed Reindeer (1964). Its success paved the way for the theatrical feature Mad Monster Party? (1967), and television specials like The Ballad of Smokey the Bear (1966).

In 1968, the company was renamed Rankin/Bass Productions, shortly before the debut of The Mouse on the Mayflower and The Little Drummer Boy. The 1970s brought additional television successes including Santa Claus Is Comin' to Town (1970) and Here Comes Peter Cottontail (1971).

Traditional hand-drawn animation was employed in features like The Wacky World of Mother Goose (1967), specials like Frosty the Snowman (1969), and series like The King Kong Show (1966). Bass shared the director credit with Rankin for the aforementioned productions. Their later collaborations included the hit cartoon ThunderCats (1985–1989) and The Wind in the Willows (1987).

Bass wrote the lyrics for many of the films he directed, collaborating with composer Maury Laws. This began with his first solo directing project, the live-action/stop-motion feature The Daydreamer (1966). Bass also wrote for some of the company's specials and series under the pseudonym "Julian P. Gardner" (a moniker Rankin also sometimes used; it combined "Jules" with the name of one of Rankin's sons), some of which include The First Christmas: The Story of the First Christmas Snow, The Life & Adventures of Santa Claus, and the Emmy Award-nominated The Little Drummer Boy, Book II. With Laws, he wrote songs performed by Fred Astaire, Danny Kaye, Mickey Rooney, Ed Wynn, Patty Duke, Ray Bolger, Shirley Booth, John Huston, Roddy McDowall, Danny Thomas, José Ferrer, Vincent Price, Phyllis Diller, Boris Karloff, and the Vienna Boys' Choir. Bass also adapted the verse of J. R. R. Tolkien, approved by the Tolkien estate, into musicalized lyrics for the first completed film adaptation of The Hobbit, in 1977. The animated feature, produced for NBC, was awarded the Peabody Award.

Bass stopped directing and producing films in 1987. He later authored a series of children's books, based around the character of Herb, the Vegetarian Dragon and Cooking with Herb. He also wrote fiction for adults including Headhunters, which was adapted into the 2011 Selena Gomez feature, Monte Carlo.

== Personal life ==
His first marriage was to Renee Fisherman. Together, they had one daughter, Jean Nicole, who predeceased Bass in January 2022. They eventually divorced. His second marriage, to Sylvia Bass, also ended in divorce.

== Death ==
Bass died due to age-related illness on October 25, 2022, at Osborn Senior Living in Rye, New York. He was 87 years old. He was cremated at Clinton Funeral Home in Cold Spring, New York. Its funeral directors buried his urn at Wellwood Cemetery afterwards. His public memorial service was held at a later date.

== Filmography ==
=== Films ===
- The Daydreamer (1966) (solo)
- Mad Monster Party (1967) (solo)
- The Wacky World of Mother Goose (1967) (with Kizo Nagashima)
- The Little Drummer Boy (1968)
- Frosty the Snowman (1969)
- The Year Without a Santa Claus (1974)
- Rudolph's Shiny New Year (1976)
- The Hobbit (1977) (TV movie)
- The Return of the King (1980) (TV movie)
- Rudolph and Frosty's Christmas in July (1980) (TV movie)
- Pinocchio's Christmas (1980)
- The Last Unicorn (1982)
- The Life and Adventures of Santa Claus (1985) (TV movie)

=== Other ===
- Rudolph the Red-Nosed Reindeer (1964) (co-producer)
- Marco (1973) (co-producer)
- Bushido Blade (1981) (executive producer) (Rankin Jr. as producer)

== Television series ==
- SilverHawks (1986) (showrunner)
- ThunderCats (1985–1989) (executive producer)

== Writings ==
- Herb, the Vegetarian Dragon, 1999, Barefoot Books. ISBN 978-1902283364
- Cooking with Herb, the Vegetarian Dragon: A Cook Book for Kids, 1999, Barefoot Books. ISBN 978-1841480404
- Headhunters, 2001, ISBN 978-0515131338
- The Mythomaniacs, 2013, Eltanin Publishing. ASIN B00GM721UC
