= Bernard Cowan =

Canadian actor, producer and writer

- Born: June 11, 1922
- Died: July 17, 1990 (aged 68)
- Resting place: Bathurst Lawn Memorial Park
- Other name: Bunny Cowan
- Occupations: Actor, Producer, Writer

Bernard Cowan (June 11, 1922 – July 17, 1990) was a Canadian actor, producer and writer. He was born in Vancouver, British Columbia. He was occasionally credited under his nickname, Bunny Cowan. His name was pronounced with emphasis on the first syllable of "Bernard" and last name as "cow in".

Cowan worked as the announcer on many CBC television series such as The Pierre Berton Show, Front Page Challenge and Wayne and Shuster. He also worked on such animated series as Spider-Man, The Marvel Super Heroes, Rocket Robin Hood, The King Kong Show, and the Christmas special Rudolph the Red-Nosed Reindeer voicing Bumble, Clarice’s Father, and the Spotted Elephant.

Bernard Cowan was the father of the Canadian disc jockey and voice actor Rob Cowan, and the cousin of Paul Soles, whom Cowan frequently employed as a voice actor on his productions.

He died on July 17, 1990, at the age of 68.
