= Lorne Greene =

Canadian actor (1915–1987)

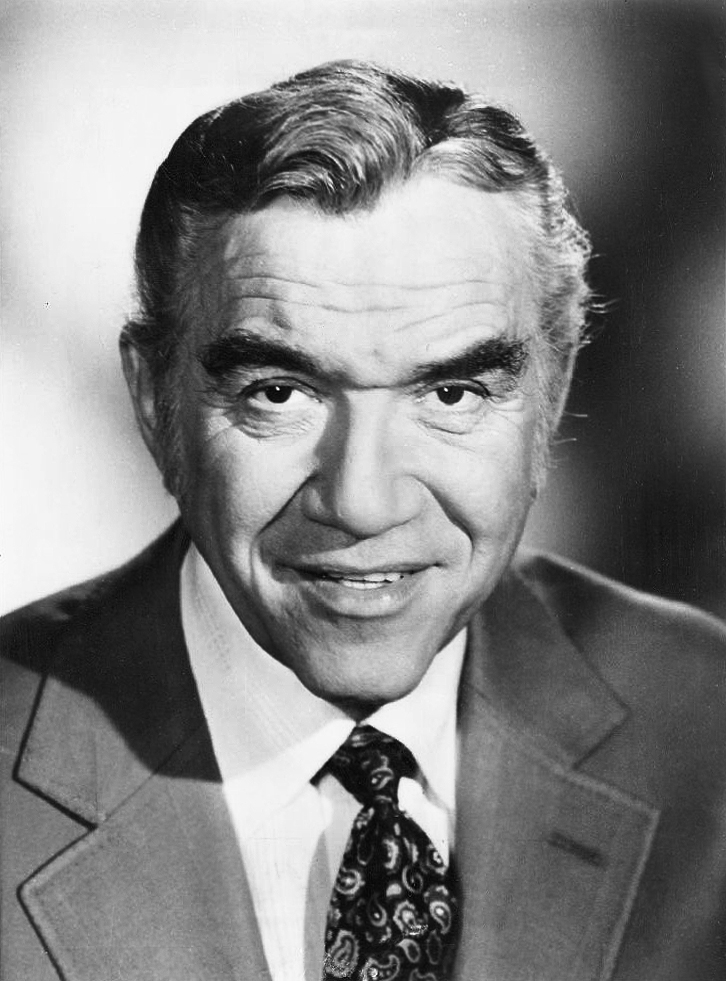
- Greene in 1969
- Born: Lyon Himan Green; February 12, 1915; Ottawa, Ontario, Canada
- Died: September 11, 1987 (aged 72); Santa Monica, California, US
- Resting place: Hillside Memorial Park Cemetery
- Other names: Chaim Green; Lorne Hyman Greene
- Occupations: Actor; singer; radio personality
- Years active: 1939–1987
- Spouses: Rita Hands (m. 1938; div. 1960); Nancy Deale (m. 1961)
- Children: 3
- Parents: Daniel Green (father); Dora (née Grinovsky) Green (mother)
- Relatives: Sam Raimi (son-in-law)

Lorne Hyman Greene (born Lyon Himan Green; February 12, 1915 – September 11, 1987) was a Canadian actor, singer, and radio personality. His notable roles include Ben Cartwright in the Western television series Bonanza and Commander Adama in the original science-fiction television series Battlestar Galactica and its follow-up series Galactica 1980. He appeared in major films such as Peyton Place (1957) and Earthquake (1974), as well as the hit television miniseries The Moneychangers (1976) and Roots (1977). He also worked on the Canadian television nature documentary series Lorne Greene's New Wilderness during the 1980s and did many television commercials. During the 1960s, he also enjoyed a side career as a country music recording artist, and in 1964 scored a number one pop hit in both the U.S. and Canada with the single "Ringo".

== Early life, family and education ==
Greene was born Lyon Himan Green on February 12, 1915, in Ottawa, Ontario, to Jewish immigrants from the Russian Empire, Dora (née Grinovsky) and Daniel Green, a shoemaker. He was called "Chaim" by his mother, and his name is shown as "Hyman" on his school report cards. In a biography written by his daughter, she wrote that it was unknown when he began using the name Lorne or when he added an "e" to Green.

Greene was the drama instructor at Camp Arowhon, a summer camp in Algonquin Provincial Park, Ontario, Canada, where he developed his talents. He acted while attending Queen's University in Kingston, Ontario. While there, he acquired a knack for broadcasting with the Radio Workshop of the university's Drama Guild on the campus radio station CFRC.

== Career ==
=== Early years ===
He initially aimed at a career in chemical engineering, but became interested in theatre, and upon graduation from Queens University moved to New York to study acting at the Neighborhood Playhouse School of the Theatre. Relocating to Toronto in 1939, he found a job as a newsreader for the Canadian Broadcasting Corporation (CBC), soon becoming principal newsreader on the CBC National News. He received the unofficial title "The Voice of Canada"; however, his deep, resonant voice and sonorous delivery of the increasingly distressing war news provoked the alternate nickname "The Voice of Doom". During his radio days, Greene invented a countdown timer, making a stopwatch run backwards from a set time limit and count down to zero. This helped radio announcers gauge how much time was left to a segment while speaking.

Greene continued his work at the CBC throughout World War II, although he officially joined the Royal Canadian Air Force, in 1942, and held the rank of flying officer. In addition to his radio work, Greene narrated newsreel and documentary films, such as the National Film Board of Canada's Fighting Norway (1943).

After the war, he left the CBC and became a freelancer when the network ordered staff announcers to turn over a large percentage of any income they earned from film narration. Greene continued to appear on CBC on a freelance basis while becoming the newsreader for private radio station CKEY in Toronto, while also returning to acting work both on stage and in radio plays.

=== Lorne Greene Academy of Radio Arts ===
Greene founded the Lorne Greene Academy of Radio Arts in Toronto in 1945 and was its dean. The school trained a number of future broadcasters and actors including Leslie Nielsen, James Doohan, Les Rubie, Gordie Tapp, Fred Davis, Billie Mae Richards, William Davidson, Alfie Scopp, Murray Chercover, Jonathan Frid, Cec Linder, Les Lye, Bill Luxton, and Roy Currie. The school was located on Jarvis Street across from what was then the CBC Radio building. Its faculty included many CBC staff such as Mavor Moore, Fletcher Markle, Lister Sinclair, Andrew Allan, and Esse Ljungh, and graduated a total of 381 students in seven years, 90% of whom found work in the industry. Though successful academically, the school continually lost money, resulting in Greene closing the school in 1952, allowing him to sell the building to recoup his losses.

=== In the United States ===
After closing his Academy of Radio Arts in 1952, Greene relocated to the United States. Katharine Cornell cast him twice in her Broadway productions in 1953: first, in The Prescott Proposals; then in a verse drama by Christopher Fry, The Dark Is Light Enough. Greene likewise began appearing in isolated episodes on live television in the 1950s. In 1953, he appeared in the title role of a one-hour adaptation of Shakespeare's drama Othello. In 1954, Greene made his Hollywood debut as Saint Peter in The Silver Chalice and made several more films and appearances on American television. In 1955, he starred in the British Canadian television series Sailor of Fortune. In 1955, Greene portrayed Ludwig van Beethoven in an episode of the TV version of You Are There and also appeared as Marcus Brutus in Julius Caesar at the Stratford Festival. In 1957, Greene played the prosecutor in the feature film Peyton Place.

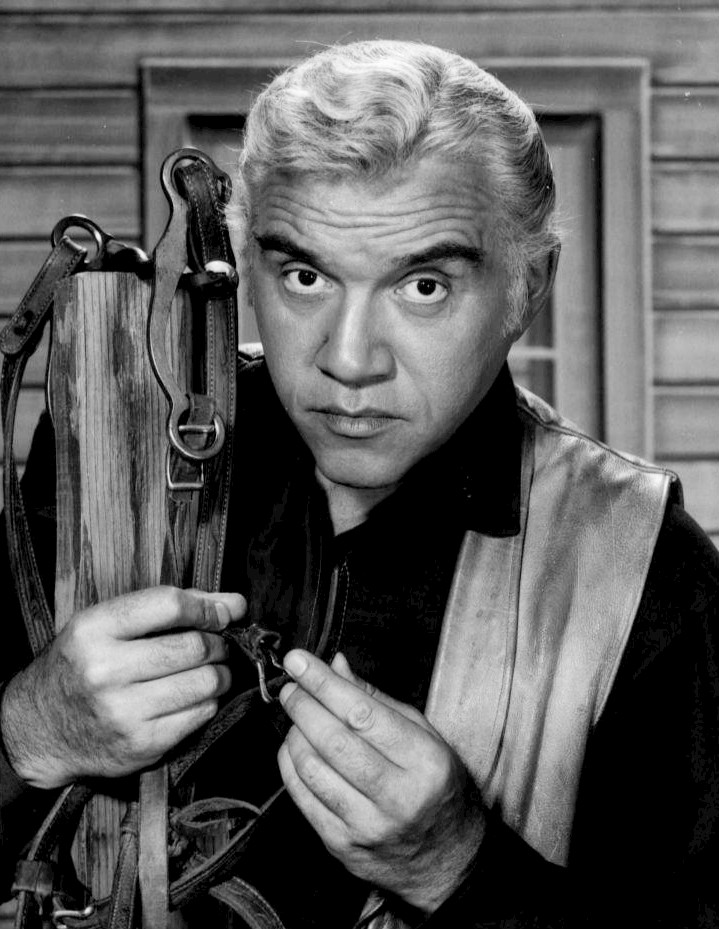
Greene as Ben Cartwright (1959)

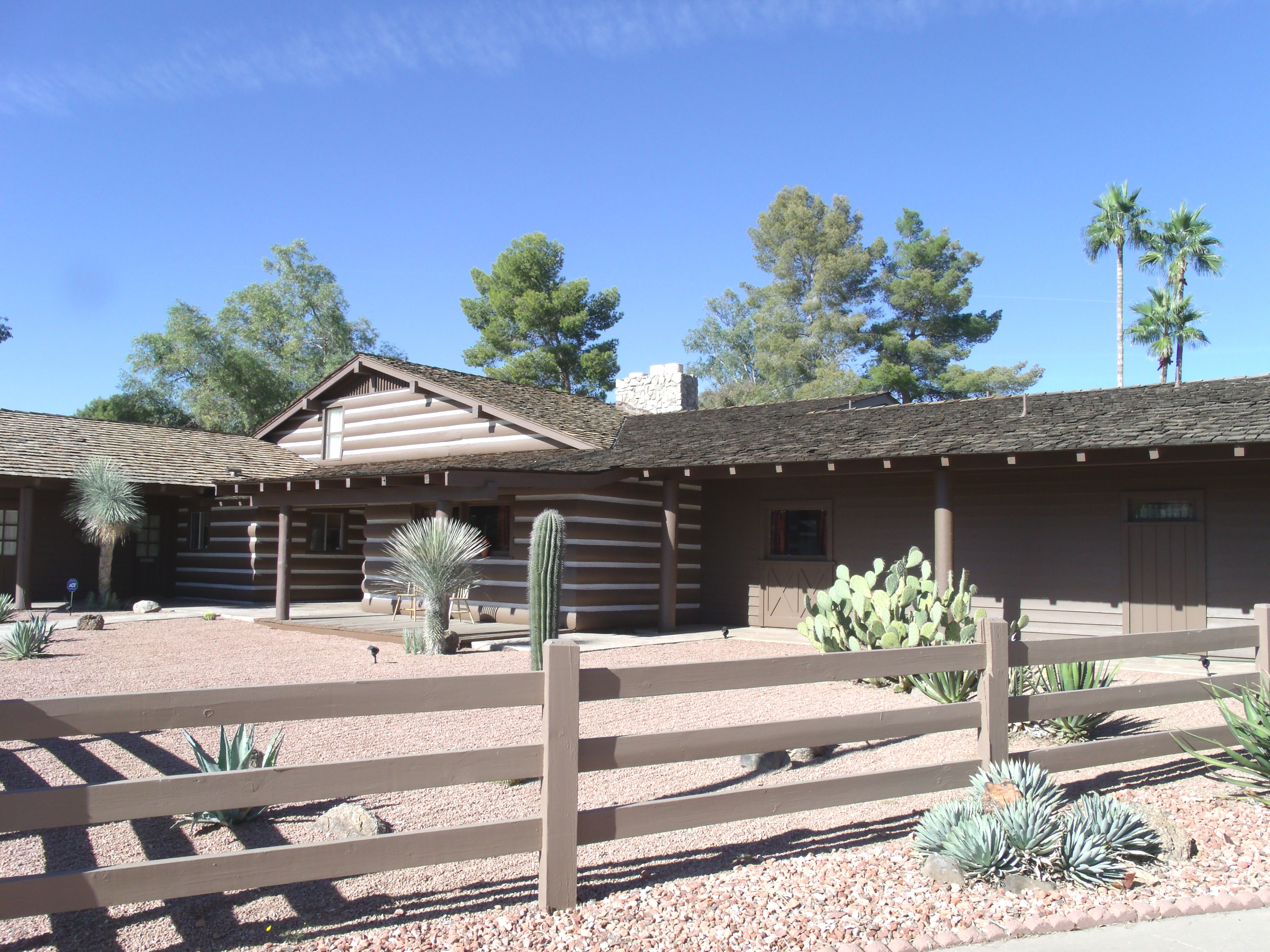
Greene's Ponderosa II House in Mesa, Arizona

The first of his continuing TV roles was as the patriarch Ben "Pa" Cartwright in Bonanza, the first one-hour Western series filmed in colour (1959–1973), making Greene a household name. He garnered the role after his performance as O'Brien in the CBS production of Nineteen Eighty-Four.

In the 1960s, Greene capitalized on his image as Ben Cartwright by recording several albums of country-western and folk songs, which he performed in a mixture of spoken word and singing. In 1964, he had a number-one single on the music charts with his spoken-word ballad "Ringo" (which referred to the real-life Old West outlaw Johnny Ringo) and got play time from "Saga of the Ponderosa", which detailed the Cartwright founding of the famous ranch.

In 1973, after the cancellation of Bonanza following a 14-year run, Greene joined Ben Murphy in the ABC crime drama Griff about a Los Angeles police officer, Wade "Griff" Griffin, who retires to become a private detective. When the show failed to gain sufficient ratings and was cancelled after 13 episodes, Greene thereafter hosted the syndicated nature documentary series Last of the Wild from 1974 to 1975.

In the 1977 miniseries Roots, Greene played John Reynolds, the first master of the protagonist Kunta Kinte. Through the 1970s Greene was the spokesman for Alpo Beef Chunks dog food commercials, one of the possible origins of the phrase "Eating your own dog food".

In 2007, TV Guide listed Ben Cartwright as the nation's second-most popular TV father (behind Cliff Huxtable). Greene was also known for his role as Commander Adama, another patriarchal figure, in the science-fiction television series Battlestar Galactica (1978–1979) and Galactica 1980 (1980). Greene's typecasting as a wise father character continued with the 1981 series Code Red as a fire-department chief, whose command includes his children as subordinates. Greene appeared with his former Bonanza co-star Michael Landon in an episode of Highway to Heaven. Greene also appeared with his former Bonanza co-star Pernell Roberts in a two-part episode of Vega$.

Greene appeared in the 1986 HBO mockumentary The Canadian Conspiracy about the supposed subversion of the United States by Canadian-born media personalities. For nearly a decade, Greene co-hosted the Macy's Thanksgiving Day Parade on NBC with Betty White.

=== Back on Canadian television ===
In the 1980s Greene devoted his energies to wildlife and environmental issues, including hosting and narrating the CTV's nature series Lorne Greene's New Wilderness, a show that promoted environmental awareness.

== Personal life and death ==
Greene was married twice, first to Rita Hands of Toronto (from 1938 to 1960, when they divorced). They had two children, twins born in 1944. His second wife was Nancy Deale (from 1961 until Greene's death in 1987), with whom he had one child.

Greene built the Ponderosa II House in Mesa, Arizona, in 1960. It is located at 602 S. Edgewater Drive. It is a replica of the Bonanza set house from the former Ponderosa Ranch in Incline Village, Nevada. It is listed in the Mesa Historic Property Register.

Greene died on September 11, 1987, aged 72, from complications from pneumonia, following ulcer surgery, at Saint Johns' Hospital in Santa Monica, California. He is interred at Hillside Memorial Park Cemetery in Culver City.

== Honors and awards ==
Greene was made an Officer of the Order of Canada on October 28, 1969, "for services to the Performing Arts and to the community".

Greene was awarded an honorary Doctor of Laws degree by his alma mater, Queen's University, in 1971.

He was the 1987 recipient of the Earle Grey Award for Lifetime Achievement at the Canadian Gemini Awards.

He got a star on the Hollywood Walk of Fame at 1559 N. Vine Street as late as February 12, 1985.

In 1974, Greene received the Golden Plate Award of the American Academy of Achievement.

In February 1985, Greene was the Krewe of Bacchus King of Mardi Gras.

In May 2006, Greene became one of the first of four entertainers to ever be honored by Canada Post by being featured on a 51-cent postage stamp.

In 2015, Greene was inducted into Canada's Walk of Fame, located at King and Simcoe Streets in Toronto.

== Filmography ==
- Churchill's Island (1941) as narrator
- Warclouds in the Pacific (1941) as narrator
- Inside Fighting China (1941) as narrator
- Flight 6 (1944) as narrator
- Othello (1953) (television) as Othello
- 1984 (short film, 1953) as O'Brien
- The Philip Morris Playhouse (one episode, 1953) as Joe
- Omnibus (one episode, 1953) as Ed Bailey
- Danger (one episode, 1954) as Stranger
- The Silver Chalice (1954) as Saint Peter
- Justice (one episode, 1954, "The Desperate One")
- You Are There (three episodes, 1954–1955) as Ludwig van Beethoven / Charles Stewart Parnell
- Tight Spot (1955) as Benjamin Costain
- Climax! (one episode, 1955) as Dr. Charles Saunders
- The Elgin Hour (one episode, 1955) as Vernon Dyall
- Studio 57 (one episode, 1955) as Gentry Morton
- Alfred Hitchcock Presents (Season 1 Episode 27 "Help Wanted", 1956) as Mr. X
- Autumn Leaves (1956) as Mr. Hanson
- The Alcoa Hour (one episode, 1956) as Sheriff Gash
- Armstrong Circle Theatre (one episode, 1956) as Angelina
- The United States Steel Hour (one episode, 1956) as Dallas
- Kraft Television Theatre (one episode, 1957) as Colonel Matthews
- Playhouse 90 (one episode, 1957) as Lowell Williams
- Producers' Showcase (one episode, "Mayerling," 1957)
- Studio One (five episodes, 1953–1957)
- Peyton Place (1957) as Prosecutor
- The Hard Man (1957) as Rice Martin
- The Gift of Love (1958) as Grant Allan
- Suspicion (one episode, 1958) as Monty
- The Last of the Fast Guns (1958) as Michael O'Reilly
- Shirley Temple's Storybook (one episode, 1958) as King Bertrand
- The Buccaneer (1958) as Mercier
- The Trap (1959) as Davis
- Bonanza (417 episodes, 1959–1973) as Ben Cartwright
- The Third Man (one episode, 1959)
- The Gale Storm Show (one episode, 1959) as Constable Barnaby
- The Hangman (1959) as Marshal Clum Cummings
- Mike Hammer (two episodes, 1959) as Carl Kunard, Emmett Gates
- Bronco (one episode, 1959) as Capt. Amos Carr
- Wagon Train (one episode, 1959) as Christopher Webb
- Cheyenne (two episodes, 1960) as Colonel Bell
- The Errand Boy (1961) as Ben Cartwright – Cameo (uncredited)
- Macy's Thanksgiving Day Parade NBC (1963-1972) as host with Betty White
- The Legend of Amaluk: An Arctic Odyssey (1972) as narrator
- The Sonny & Cher Comedy Hour (January 24, 1972) as Guest(Rasputin/Red Butler)
- Griff (12 episodes, 1973–1974) as Wade Griffin
- Earthquake (1974) as Sam Royce
- Tidal Wave (1973) as Ambassador Warren Richards (1975 US Version only)
- Nevada Smith (1975) as Jonas Cord
- The Moneychangers (1976) as George Quartermain
- Roots (two episodes, 1977) as John Reynolds
- SST: Death Flight (1977) as Marshall Cole
- The Hardy Boys/Nancy Drew Mysteries (two episodes, 1977) as Inspector Hans Stavlin
- The Trial of Lee Harvey Oswald (1977) as Matthew Arnold Watson
- Yabba Dabba Doo! The Happy World of Hanna-Barbera (1977) as Special Guest
- Happy Days (1977) as Special Guest Cameo
- The Little Brown Burro (1978) as narrator or story teller
- The Bastard (1978) as Bishop Francis
- Battlestar Galactica (21 episodes, 1978–1979) as Commander Adama
- The Love Boat (three episodes, 1979–1982) as Buck Hamilton S6 E7 (1982)/ Buddy Bowers
- Klondike Fever (1980) as Sam Steele
- Galactica 1980 (10 episodes, 1980) as Commander Adama
- Living Legend: The King of Rock and Roll (1980)
- Pink Lady (one episode, 1980) as himself
- Vega$ (two episodes, 1980) as Emil Remick
- A Time for Miracles (1980) as Bishop John Carroll
- Aloha Paradise (one episode, 1981) as Businessman
- The Wizard of Oz (1982) as The Wizard (voice)
- Code Red (12 episodes, 1981–1982) as Battalion Chief Joe Rorchek
- Police Squad! (one episode, 1982) as Stabbed Man
- Heidi's Song (1982) as Grandfather (voice)
- Lorne Greene's New Wilderness (104 episodes, 1982–1987) as Host / Narrator
- The Nutcracker: A Fantasy on Ice (1983) as grandfather/ narrator
- The Canadian Conspiracy (a 1985 mockumentary) as himself / a head of the Canadian conspiracy
- Highway to Heaven (one episode, 1985) as Fred Fusco
- The Greatest Adventure: Stories from the Bible (1986) as Noah (voice)
- Vasectomy: A Delicate Matter (1986) as Theo Marshall
- The Alamo: Thirteen Days to Glory (1987) as General Sam Houston (final film role)

== Discography ==
=== Albums ===
Year	Album	US	Label
1961	Robin Hood of El Dorado	—	MGM
1962	Bonanza Ponderosa Party Time	—	RCA
1963	Young at Heart	—	RCA
1963	Christmas on the Ponderosa	—	RCA
1964	Peter and the Wolf	—	RCA
1964	Welcome to the Ponderosa	35	RCA
1965	The Man	—	RCA
1965	American West	—	RCA
1965	Have a Happy Holiday	54	RCA
1966	Portrait of the West	—	RCA

=== Singles ===
Year	Single	Chart Positions					Album
Year	Single	CAN Country	CAN Pop	US	US Country	US AC	Album
1962	"My Sons My Sons"	—	—	—	—	—	Bonanza Ponderosa Party Time
1963	"I'm the Same Ole Me"	—	—	—	—	—	single only
1964	"Ringo"	—	1	1	21	1	Welcome to the Ponderosa
1965	"The Man"	3	—	72	—	—	The Man
1965	"Ol' Tin Cup"	—	—	—	—	—	Welcome to the Ponderosa
1966	"Five Card Stud"	—	—	112	—	—	American West
1966	"Daddy's Little Girl"	—	—	—	—	—	singles only
1966	"Waco"	—	—	—	50	—	singles only
1969	"It's All in the Game"	—	—	—	—	—	singles only
1970	"Daddy (I'm Proud to Be Your Son)"	—	—	—	—	—	singles only
1970	"First Word"	—	—	—	—	—	singles only
1976	"Spirit of America"	—	—	—	—	—	singles only

== See also ==
- Canadian pioneers in early Hollywood
- Western (genre)
