= Lorne Greene Academy of Radio Arts =

Canadian broadcasting school (1945–1952)

Location
- 447 Jarvis Street; Toronto, Ontario; Canada

Information
- Other name: Academy of Radio Arts
- Type: Private broadcasting school
- Established: 1945
- Founder: Lorne Greene
- Closed: 1952

The Lorne Greene Academy of Radio Arts, also known as the Academy of Radio Arts, was a private broadcasting school in Toronto, Ontario, Canada, founded in 1945 by actor and broadcaster Lorne Greene. The school provided training in radio announcing, acting, writing and production. It operated until 1952 and had 381 graduates, including a number who subsequently became prominent in Canadian and American broadcasting and entertainment.

Greene served as dean of the school. The academy trained students for careers in radio and acting.

== History ==
Greene established the academy after working as a radio announcer for the Canadian Broadcasting Corporation (CBC) during the Second World War. The school was intended to provide practical professional training for people seeking careers in broadcasting.

The academy was registered with the Ontario Department of Education. It originally was located at 106 Adelaide Street West before moving to 447 Jarvis Street, across from the CBC's Toronto studios.

== Courses and faculty ==
The academy offered a six-month course costing $400. Instruction covered radio acting, announcing, broadcast speech, writing, production, sound effects and the commercial aspects of broadcasting.

It also offered classes in group singing, production direction, and radio writing.

Its faculty included Andrew Allan, head of CBC radio drama; playwright, actor and producer Mavor Moore; radio and television writer, director and producer Fletcher Markle; playwright and radio dramatist Lister Sinclair; and CBC radio producer Esse Ljungh. Other instructors included Jack Allison, W. H. Brodie, radio actor John Drainie, and Greene. Writer and broadcaster Max Braithwaite and actress Marjorie Leete also taught at the school.

== Notable students ==
Among the academy's students were actors Leslie Nielsen, known for the Airplane! and The Naked Gun films; James Doohan, who played Montgomery Scott in Star Trek; Jonathan Frid, who portrayed vampire Barnabas Collins in Dark Shadows; Cec Linder, who played CIA agent Felix Leiter in Goldfinger; Billie Mae Richards, the voice of the title character in Rudolph the Red-Nosed Reindeer; Les Rubie, Alfie Scopp, who voiced Charlie-in-the-Box in Rudolph the Red-Nosed Reindeer; and Les Lye, a cast member of You Can't Do That on Television. Other students included broadcasters Gordie Tapp, a cast member of Hee Haw; Fred Davis, host of Front Page Challenge; Bill Luxton, and Roy Currie. Former students also included filmmaker William Davidson and broadcasting executive Murray Chercover, a former president of CTV.

Writer and producer Ron Krantz was also an early graduate. He subsequently worked on CBC radio and television programs, including Close-up and Project.

== Closure ==
Establishing the academy had cost Greene approximately $50,000 before its first student enrolled. Although the school graduated 381 students and reported that approximately 90 per cent found employment in broadcasting, it consistently operated at a financial loss.

Greene estimated that the school lost between $3,000 and $5,000 annually. He attributed its financial difficulties partly to his unwillingness to admit more students at the expense of academic standards. The academy closed in 1952, and Greene sold its building to recover his losses. Greene moved to the United States in 1953, appearing on Broadway and American television. He made his Hollywood film debut in 1954. In 1959, he was cast as Ben Cartwright in the long-running television western Bonanza.

A reunion of former students was held at Toronto's Royal York Hotel in October 1986.
