= A Is for Aardvark =

Canadian television series

- Created by: Lister Sinclair
- Presented by: Lister Sinclair
- Country of origin: Canada
- Original language: English
- No. of seasons: 1

Production
- Producer: Lister Sinclair
- Running time: 30 minutes

Original release
- Network: CBC Television
- Release: 7 July – 21 October 1954

A Is for Aardvark is a Canadian informational television series that aired on CBC Television in 1954.

== Premise ==
Each episode concerned a particular letter of the alphabet and discussed various subjects beginning with that letter.

The first episode featured the letter "A" and included topics such as the African violet and aspidistra plants, the explorer Amerigo Vespucci, the astrolabe and guest Andrew Allan, a CBC producer.

== Scheduling ==
The half-hour series was first telecast on Wednesdays at 10:00 pm (Eastern) from 7 July until 22 September 1954. From 30 September 1954, the show was shown Thursdays at 10:30 pm until its last episode on 21 October that year.

Only 14 episodes were broadcast, with the last episode (featuring the letter "N") hosted by James Bannerman instead of Sinclair. All 26 letters were completed in a subsequent radio series.
