= Composite monitor =

Type of analog display

An early example of a composite monitor with color graphics marketed for home use

A composite monitor or composite video monitor is any analog video display that receives input in the form of an analog composite video signal to a defined specification. A composite video signal encodes all information on a single conductor; a composite cable has a single live conductor plus earth. Other equipment with display functionality includes monitors with more advanced interfaces and connectors giving a better picture, including analog VGA, and digital DVI, HDMI, and DisplayPort; and television (TV) receivers which are self-contained, receiving and displaying video RF broadcasts received with an internal tuner. Video monitors are used for displaying computer output, closed-circuit television (e.g. security cameras) and other applications requiring a two-dimensional monochrome or colour image.

== Inputs ==
Composite monitors usually use RCA jacks or BNC connectors for video input. Earlier equipment (1970s) often used UHF connectors. Typically simple composite monitors give a picture inferior to other interfaces.

In principle a monitor can have one or several of multiple types of input, including composite—in addition to composite monitors as such, many monitors accept composite input among other standards. In practice computer monitors ceased to support composite input as other interfaces became predominant.

A composite monitor must have a two-dimensional approximately flat display device with circuitry to accept a composite signal with picture and synchronisation information, process it into monochrome chrominance and luminance, or the red, green, and blue of RGB, plus synchronisation pulses, and display it on a screen, which was predominantly a CRT until the 21st century, and then a thin panel using LCD or other technology.

A critical factor in the quality of this display is the type of encoding used in the TV camera to combine the signal together and the decoding used in the monitor to separate the signals back to RGB for display. Composite monitors can be very high quality, with professional broadcast reference displays costing US$10k-$15k as of 2000. Comb filters are frequently used to improve the quality of a composite monitor.

== Early innovations ==
Originally, these monitors were used for commercial studios. Composite video first saw home use for dubbing tapes on VCRs. Early computers, both commercial and amateur, mostly used teleprinters for output; simple home models might simply display an array of lights to be interpreted as binary information. Later the concept of the TV Typewriter was born, effectively the video monitor used for digital information; this was implemented as dedicated monitors and as interfaces to the television receivers present in many homes. Many computers incorporated a display. From the late 1970s stand-alone composite monitors came into use, including by the Apple II, VIC-20, Commodore 64, Atari 8-bit computers, IBM PC with CGA card, some IBM PC compatibles, Hewlett-Packard 200 series, and other home and business computers of the 1980s. These computers had composite video outputs, and sometimes composite monitors bundled with the systems. Some computer companies separately sold their own composite monitors for use with their computers.

=== Composite video and game consoles ===
During the same time period, home game consoles chose to stick with RF modulation since many people had color televisions without composite video inputs. However, in 1985, the NES was released and was the first game console to feature direct composite outputs. Although the redesigned NES (NES 2) lacked these outputs, the Super NES and nearly all consoles made since have included the direct composite outputs. From the fifth generation systems (such as the Sony PlayStation and the Nintendo 64) onward, many consoles used these outputs as the primary means of connecting to the television, requiring a separate adapter for use on televisions lacking composite inputs. As of today, some people still use stand-alone composite monitors for some purposes, including modern game consoles even with the advent of televisions with a tuner and composite inputs combined.

== Composite input to non-composite device ==
When a composite monitor is not available, a device requiring one can use an RF modulator to encode a composite output onto a RF signal which can be received by an analog television, available in many homes until the digital switchover.

Devices are available to convert from composite to other standards such as analog VGA or digital HDMI; such devices may be called upscalers or scan converters, although not all devices with these names will handle composite input. A converter with electronics is necessary; a simple cable will not do the job.

With a market full of many solutions to convert composite (or its related standard S-video) to other video transmission standards, it has offered opportunities to repurpose non-composite monitors for composite video input, in which composite monitors themselves have also been repurposed for other applications of their own.

== Commercial use of composite monitors ==
- Television studios use stand-alone composite video monitors to check and judge their output picture quality. These are usually high-end professional broadcast monitors that are used to view the output of professional video cameras, VTRs, character generators, telecines and DDRs. They can also be used when new video devices are being tested. Most commercial composite monitors have no audio support or speakers, as the audio system is processed through high-quality audio equipment.
- Stand-alone composite monitors are commonly used for closed-circuit television and video surveillance.

Some monitors used in video surveillance give a monochrome picture.

== Common features ==
- Stereo sound
- TV tuner
- Front AV inputs
- S-Video input
- Closed captioning

== Other video standards ==
Other video standards include

- RGB video, 3 signals, red, green and blue, with synchronisation information, on three wires from a computer or other source
- Component video, 3 signals such as Y′UV or Y, B-Y, R-Y
- S-Video, 2 signals, which have the brightness (luminance) information on one cable and the color information (chrominance) on another. Most monitors with S-Video inputs also support composite inputs
- Several digital video standards, including DVI and HDMI
- VGA, an analog standard used to display digital signals

Monitors sometimes support several standards. Absence of certain video inputs may require purchase of signal adapters to reuse electronics that are otherwise incompatible.

== See also ==
- VGA connector
- Video projector

== Sources ==
- Bigelow, Stephen J. (1997). Troubleshooting and repairing computer monitors. OCLC 1151450678.
- Desposito, Joe; Garabedian, Kevin (1997). Computer monitor troubleshooting and repair. OCLC 1028562961.
- Edwards, Benj (19 April 2021) [2015]. "A brief history of Computer Displays". PC World. Australia: IDG. Archived from the original on 29 April 2021.
