= Reliance MediaWorks =

Indian film and entertainment services company

Reliance MediaWorks Limited
- Formerly: Adlabs Films Ltd. (1975–2009)
- Type: Private
- Industry: Mass media
- Founded: 1975; 51 years ago, Mumbai
- Headquarters: Goregaon, Mumbai, India
- Key people: Venkatesh Roddam (CEO)
- Revenue: ₹8.5 billion (US$91 million) (2011)
- Number of employees: 1,566 (2011)
- Parent: Reliance Group
- Subsidiaries: BIG Synergy, Lowry Digital & Reliance Mediaworks UK
- Website: Official Website

Reliance MediaWorks Limited (RMW) is a film and entertainment services company and a member of the Reliance Group.

The company is one of India's film and entertainment services companies with a presence across several media businesses including the theatrical exhibition of films, television content production and distribution, and film and media services. The company facilities have been MPAA certified. Services provided by the company include Motion Picture Processing and DI, Digital Distribution, Audio Restoration and Image Enhancement, 2D to 3D conversion, Digital Master, Studios and Equipment rentals, Visual Effects, Animation and Post Production for TV Advertisements. RMW's operations are spread across India, UK and the US.

RMW's television venture BIG Synergy is engaged in the television programming industry housing popular shows such as Kaun Banega Crorepati and Indian Idol.

Reliance MediaWorks' sound stages have also been utilized for events such as The Filmfare Awards, the movies Singham and Agneepath, and numerous television commercials.

== History ==
=== 2005–2008 ===
The company was initially established as Adlabs Films Limited in 1975 by Manmohan Shetty.

In 2005, the Reliance ADA Group became a majority stake holder in Adlabs, and in 2009, it was renamed Reliance MediaWorks Limited.

=== 2008–2009 ===
RMW expanded by setting up Asia's first Digital Intermediate Lab with a 4K facility. The lab was accredited by the Federation Against Copyright Theft.

In 2008, RMW acquired a 100% stake in Lowry Digital, a renowned image restoration and enhancement services company based in Burbank, California. Working on projects such as Avatar.

On the 40th anniversary of the Apollo 11 Moon landing on 16 July 2009, NASA tasked RMW to restore original video footage of the missing Apollo Moon landing tapes. Neil Armstrong expressed his appreciation, stating that "your restored video is now a valuable contribution to space exploration and space communication history…thanks for all you did beyond the call of duty. Our grandchildren and their grandchildren will benefit."

=== 2010 ===
In early 2010, RMW acquired iLAB UK, a film processing and post production facility located in Soho, London.

=== 2011 ===
In March 2011, RMW received a patent called "Obsidian" for creating a method for removing semi-transparent artifacts from digital images caused by contaminants in the camera's optical path. This process received a significant amount of recognition within the entertainment industry, resulting in RMW receiving a Scientific and Technical Oscar from The Academy of Motion Picture Arts and Sciences.

=== 2012 ===
In September 2012, RMW along with China's Galloping Horse acquired post production assets from Digital Domain, a legendary Hollywood studio founded by James Cameron.

=== 2013 ===
By 2013, Reliance MediaWorks expanded its business by teaming with a variety of production companies as equity investors. Hiring Academy Award winning George Murphy as the company's Chief Creative Officer in April 2013, RMW signed multimillion-dollar deals with Ethyrea Films and Random Cow.

In August 2013 RMW signed director Vadim Perelman as their Creative Director in India. The following month, the company tied up with Turner International India for post production services of its entertainment channels.

=== 2014 ===
In 2014, Reliance Mediaworks and Prime Focus merged.

=== Awards ===
- RMW received an Oscar in Scientific and Technical Excellence from the Academy of Motion Pictures Arts and Sciences in 2012 for the development of the 'Lowery Process', a unique and efficient system for "Reduction of noise and other disturbances", thereby providing high-quality images required in the film-making process.

== Recent credits ==
- Ninja Hattori-kun (2012 anime)
