= Apollo 11 missing tapes =

Lost NASA telemetry data tapes

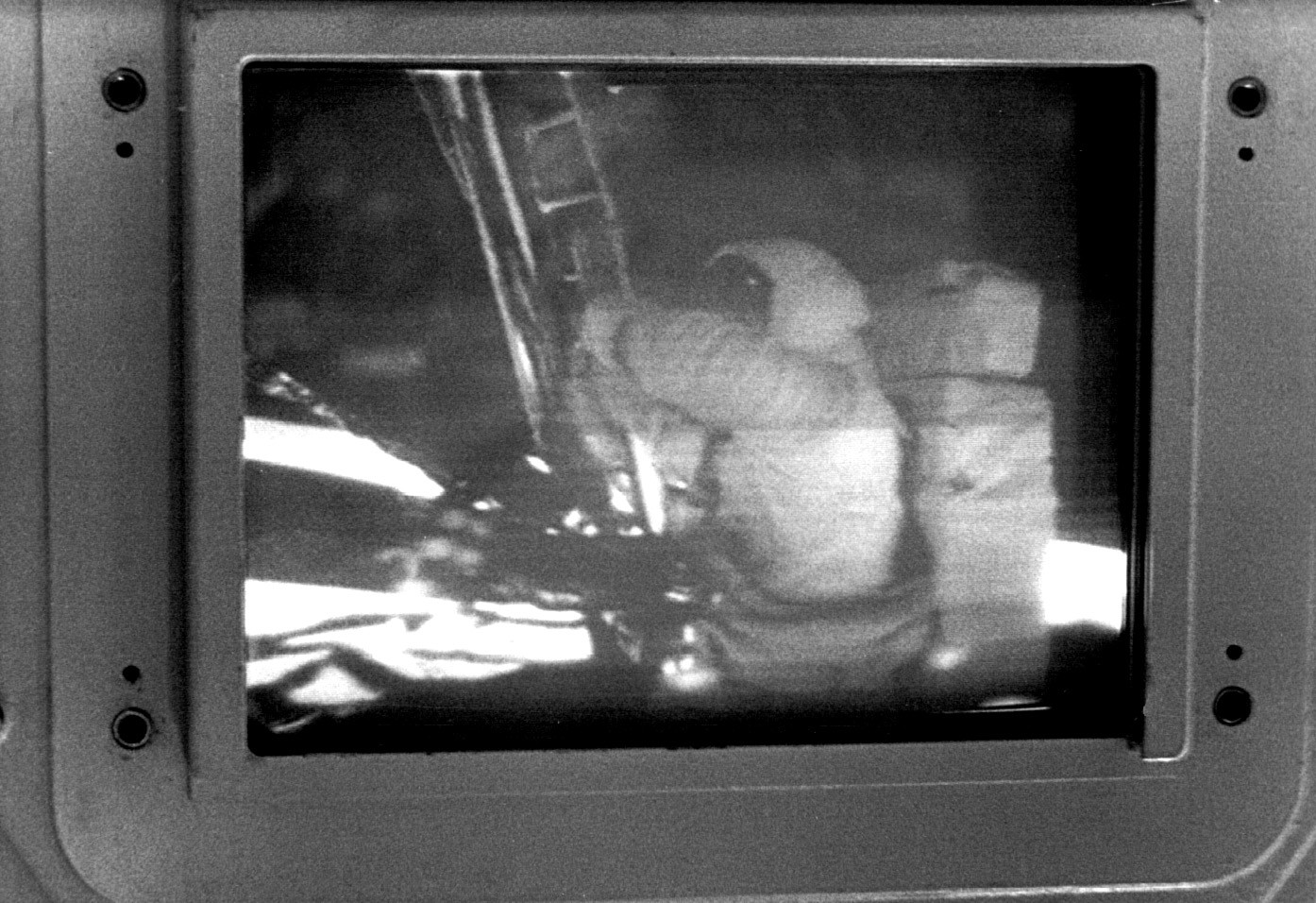
The original slow-scan television signal from the Apollo TV camera, photographed at Honeysuckle Creek on July 21, 1969

The Apollo 11 missing tapes were those that were recorded from Apollo 11's slow-scan television (SSTV) telecast in its raw format on telemetry data tape at the time of the first Moon landing in 1969 and subsequently lost. The data tapes were used to record all transmitted data, video as well as telemetry, for backup.

Apollo 11 was also equipped with other imaging systems whose original high-resolution data survive, notably the 16mm Maurer Data Acquisition Camera, which recorded Armstrong's descent down the ladder and approximately 86 minutes of the lunar EVA, as well as Hasselblad 70mm still cameras.

To broadcast the SSTV transmission on standard television, NASA ground receiving stations performed real-time scan conversion to the NTSC television format. The moonwalk's converted video signal was broadcast live around the world on July 21, 1969 (2:56 UTC). At the time, the NTSC broadcast was recorded on many videotapes and kinescope films. Many of these low-quality recordings remain intact. As the real-time broadcast worked and was widely recorded, preservation of the backup video was not deemed a priority in the years immediately following the mission. In the early 1980s, NASA's Landsat program was facing a severe shortage of data tapes and it is likely the tapes were erased and reused at this time.

A team of retired NASA employees and contractors tried to find the tapes in the early 2000s but was unable to do so. The search was sparked when several still photographs appeared in the late 1990s that showed the visually superior raw SSTV transmission on ground-station monitors. The research team conducted a multi-year investigation in the hopes of finding the most pristine and detailed video images of the moonwalk. If copies of the original SSTV format tapes were to be found, more modern digital technology could make a higher-quality conversion, yielding better images than those originally seen. The researchers concluded that the tapes containing the raw unprocessed Apollo 11 SSTV signal were erased and reused by NASA in the early 1980s, following standard procedure at the time.

Although the researchers never found the telemetry tapes, they did discover the best visual quality NTSC videotapes as well as Super 8 movie film taken of a video monitor in Australia, showing the SSTV transmission before it was converted. These visual elements were processed in 2009, as part of a NASA-approved restoration project of the first moonwalk. At a 2009 news conference in Washington, D.C., the research team released its findings regarding the tapes' disappearance. They also partially released newly enhanced footage obtained during the search. Lowry Digital completed the full moonwalk restoration project in late 2009.

== Background ==
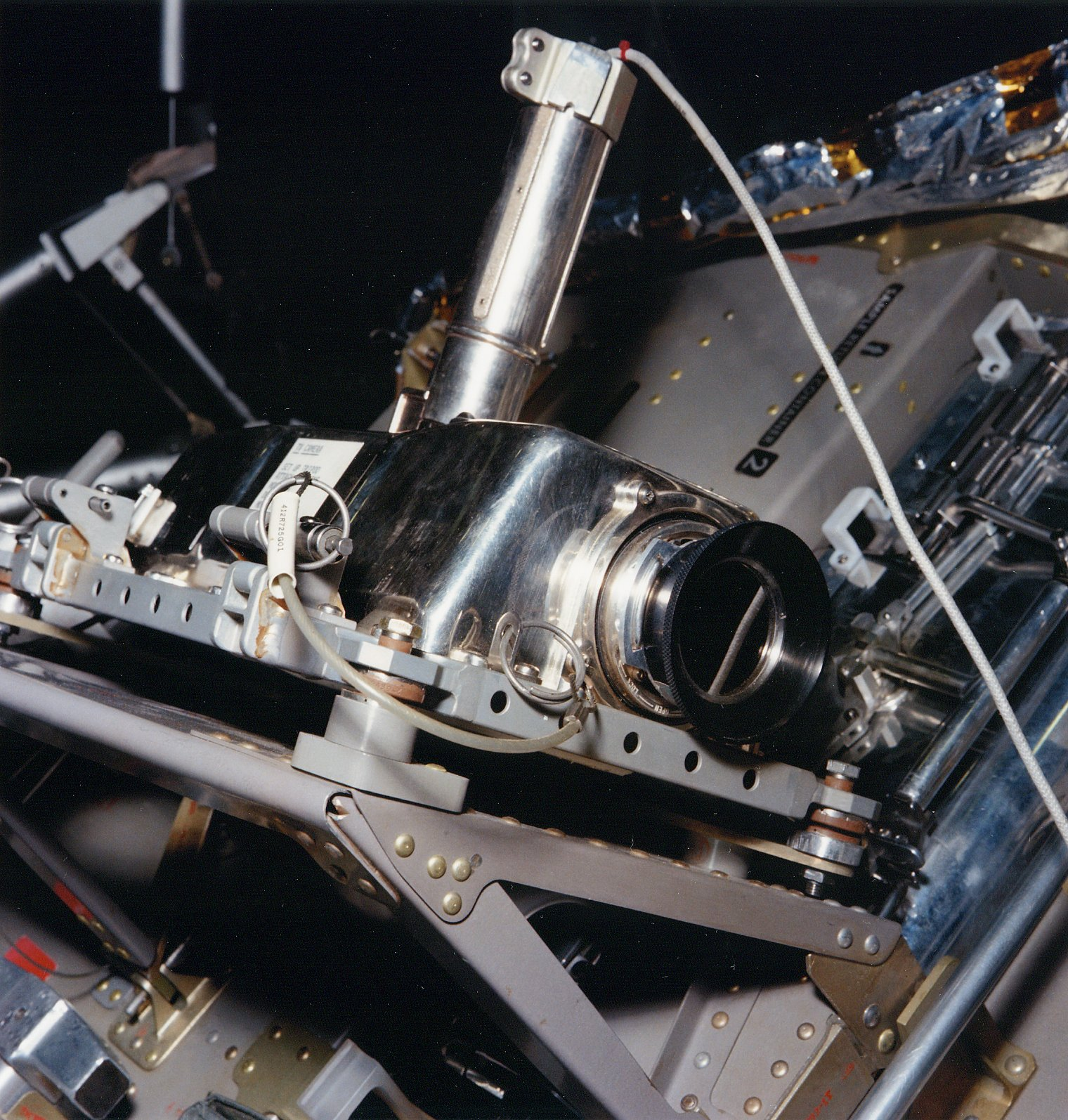
The television camera, as it was positioned on the Apollo Lunar Module Eagle at the start of the first lunar EVA (Extravehicular Activity)

Apollo 11 was the spaceflight that landed the first two people on the Moon. Neil Armstrong became the first person to step onto the lunar surface on July 21, 1969, at 02:56 UTC. Buzz Aldrin joined him 19 minutes later. Only limited radio bandwidth was available to transmit the video signal from the lunar landings, which needed to be multiplexed with other communication and telemetry channels beamed from the Lunar Module Eagle, back to Earth.

Therefore, Apollo 11's moonwalk video was transmitted from the Apollo TV camera in a monochrome SSTV format at 10 frames per second (fps) with 320 lines of resolution, progressively scanned. These SSTV signals were received by radio telescopes at Parkes Observatory in Australia, the Goldstone tracking station in California, and Honeysuckle Creek tracking station, also in Australia.

The camera's video format was incompatible with existing NTSC, PAL, and SECAM broadcast television standards. It needed to be converted before it could be shown on broadcast television networks. This live conversion was crude, essentially using a video camera pointing at a high-quality 10-inch (25 cm) TV monitor.

=== Video signal processing ===
Since the camera's scan rate was much lower than the approximately 30 fps for NTSC video, (Note: For the purposes of clarity and simplicity in this article, 60 fields and 30 frames per second are used. NTSC actually runs at 60/1.001 ≅ 59.94 fields per second, and 30/1.001 ≅ 29.97 frames per second. Two interlaced fields create one complete video frame.) the television standard used in North America at the time, a real-time scan conversion was needed to be able to show its images on a regular TV set. NASA selected a scan converter manufactured by RCA to convert the black-and-white SSTV signals from the Apollo 7, 8, 9 and 11 missions.

When the Apollo TV camera radioed its images, the ground stations received its raw unconverted SSTV signal and split it into two branches. One signal branch was sent unprocessed to a 14-track analog data tape recorder, where it was recorded onto 14-inch (36 cm) diameter reels of one-inch-wide (25 mm) analog magnetic data tapes at 120 inches (3.0 m) per second. The other raw SSTV signal branch was sent to the RCA scan converter, where it was processed into an NTSC broadcast television signal.

The RCA scan converter operated on an optical conversion principle. The conversion process started when the signal was sent to a high-quality 10-inch (25 cm) video monitor, where a conventional RCA TK-22 television camera—using the NTSC broadcast standard of 525 scanned lines interlaced at 30 fps—merely re-photographed its screen. The monitor had persistent phosphors that acted as a primitive framebuffer. An analog disk recorder, based on the Ampex HS-100 model, was used to record the first field from the camera.

It then fed that field, and an appropriately time-delayed copy of the first field, to the NTSC Field Interlace Switch (encoder). The combined original and copied fields created the first full 525-line interlaced frame and the signal was then sent to Houston. The disk recorder repeated this sequence five more times, until the camera imaged the next SSTV frame. The converter then repeated the whole process with each new frame downloaded from space in real time. In this way, the RCA converter produced the extra 20 frames per second needed to produce flicker-free images to the world's television broadcasters.

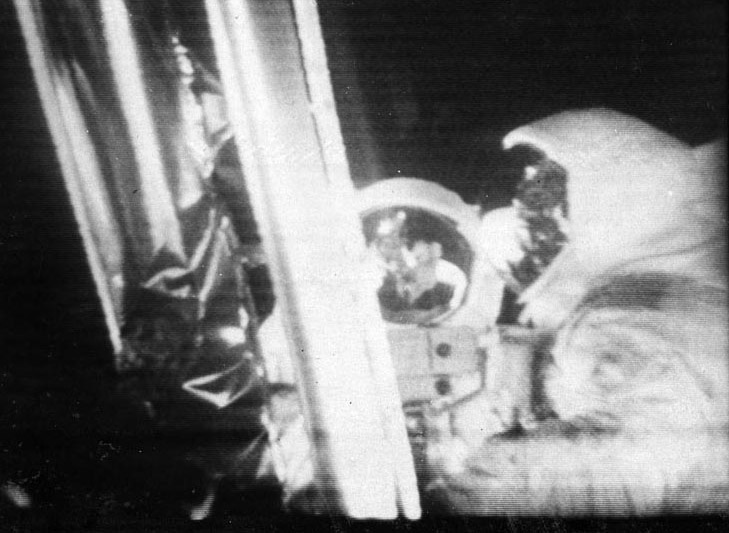
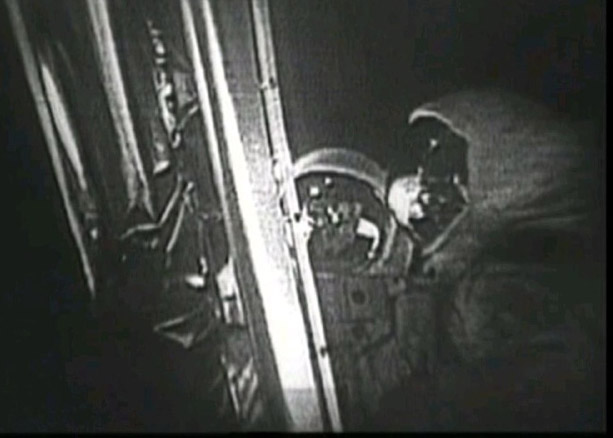
A photograph of the original SSTV signal of Aldrin and Armstrong at the foot of Eagle (left)—its conversion for broadcast (right) significantly degraded its image quality

This live conversion was crude compared to early-21st-century electronic digital conversion techniques. Image degradation was unavoidable with this system as the monitor and camera's optical limitations significantly lowered the original SSTV signal's contrast, brightness and resolution. If the scan converter's settings were incorrectly set, as they were at the Goldstone station during the first few minutes of Apollo 11's moonwalk, the negative impact on the image could be very obvious.

When Armstrong first came down the Lunar Module's ladder, he was barely visible because the contrast and the vertical phase were not set correctly by the scan converter operator. The video seen on home television sets was further degraded by the very long and noisy analog transmission path.

The converted signal was sent by satellite from the three receiving ground stations to Houston. Then the network pool feed was sent by microwave relay to New York, where it was broadcast live to the United States and the world. Because all of these links were analog, each one added additional noise and distortion to the signal.

=== NTSC broadcast tapes ===
This low-quality optical conversion of the Apollo 11 moonwalk video images—made with a TV camera taking pictures of a video monitor—is what was widely recorded in real-time onto kinescope film and NTSC broadcast-quality two-inch quadruplex videotape. Recordings of this conversion were not lost and have long been available to the public, along with much higher-quality video from later Apollo missions. If the one-inch (25 mm) data tapes, containing the raw unprocessed Apollo 11 SSTV signals, were to be found, modern digital technology would allow for significantly better conversion and processing. The quality would be similar to that viewed by a few technicians and others at SSTV-receiving ground stations before the video was converted to NTSC.

In 2005, an amateur Super 8 movie with about 15 minutes of Apollo 11 images was rediscovered. The footage had been taken by Ed von Renouard at Honeysuckle Creek tracking station during or immediately after the Apollo 11 moonwalk. The images show mainly the scan converted monitor and briefly the slow-scan monitor. This is some of the best quality recording of brief segments of the Apollo 11 moonwalk available. The images are available on DVD.

== Search for the missing tapes ==
News that these analog data tapes were missing emerged on August 5, 2006, when the print and online versions of The Sydney Morning Herald published a story with the title One giant blunder for mankind: how NASA lost moon pictures. The missing tapes were among over 700 boxes of magnetic data tapes recorded throughout the Apollo program that have not been found.

On August 16, 2006, NASA announced its official search, saying, "The original tapes may be at the Goddard Space Flight Center ... or at another location within the NASA archiving system" and "NASA engineers are hopeful that when the tapes are found they can use today's digital technology to provide a version of the moonwalk that is much better quality than what we have today." NASA also had ongoing research reasons for finding these higher-resolution tapes, as the Constellation program shared some similar tasks with the original Apollo program.

The Goddard Center's Data Evaluation Laboratory has the only known surviving piece of equipment that can read the missing tapes and was set to be closed in October 2006, causing some fear that, even if the tapes were later found, there would be no ready way to read and copy them. However, equipment that could read the tapes was maintained.

On November 1, 2006, Cosmos magazine reported that some NASA telemetry tapes from the Apollo project era had been found in a small marine science laboratory in the main physics building at Curtin University in Perth, Western Australia. One of these tapes was sent to NASA for analysis. It carried no video but did show that if any of the tapes are ever found, data could likely be read from them.

== NASA news conference ==
NASA held a news conference at the Newseum, in Washington, D.C. regarding the missing tapes on July 16, 2009—the 40th anniversary of Apollo 11's launch from Cape Kennedy. The multinational research team looking into the missing tapes—mostly retired engineers who had worked on the original broadcast in 1969—was represented at the event by Richard Nafzger from the Goddard Space Flight Center and Stanley Lebar, the former lead engineer at Westinghouse who developed the Apollo Lunar Camera and the Apollo Color Camera. They concluded that the data tapes—with the SSTV signal—were shipped from Australia to Goddard and then erased and reused by NASA in the early 1980s in order to be reused in the Landsat program, which was facing a severe data tape shortage at that time.

Australian backup tapes were also erased after Goddard received the reels, following the procedures established by NASA. The SSTV signal was recorded on telemetry data tapes mostly as a backup in case the real-time conversion and broadcast around the world failed. Since the real-time broadcast conversion worked, and was widely recorded on both videotape and film, the backup video was not deemed important at the time.

There was also documentation that the Apollo 11 moonwalk SSTV was recorded at the Parkes, Australia facility on modified Ampex two-inch helical scan VTRs. The VTRs were modified by Johns Hopkins University's Applied Physics Labs to record 320-line slow-scan video directly to the videotape without converting it. It was confirmed that these tapes were shipped to Johns Hopkins University, but they could not be found by the search team.

Nafzger stated that the team did find several post-conversion copies of the broadcast that were of higher quality than what had been previously seen by the public. Their findings included a videotape recorded in Sydney after the conversion but before the satellite transmission around the world, videotape from CBS News archives (direct from NASA, without commentary) and kinescopes at Johnson Space Center. At the news conference, it was mentioned that Lowry Digital would complete enhancing and restoring the tapes.

Mike Inchalik, president of Lowry Digital, mentioned that his company would only restore the video and would not remove defects, such as reflections that looked like flag poles. A few short clips were shown at the news conference, showing their improved quality. NASA released some partially restored samples on its website after the news conference. The full restoration of the footage, about three hours long, was completed in December 2009.

Some other footage from Australian ground-station feeds showing SSTV video of Armstrong's descent and first steps surfaced through John Sarkissian's efforts. Highlights of this fully enhanced video were shown to the public for the first time at the Australian Geographic Society Awards on October 6, 2010, where Buzz Aldrin was the guest of honor.

== Subsequent events ==
On July 6, 2019, Sotheby's announced that they would have available for sale, on July 20, three 2-inch (50 mm) video tape reels—out of a total of 1,150 reels—bought at a government surplus auction in 1976, at a price of $218 US dollars. The three reels were said to be first-generation recordings of the Apollo 11 EVA video, but were not the missing 1-inch (25 mm) telemetry data tapes. The tapes had been purchased in 1976 at a General Services Administration auction, by Gary George, then an engineering student at Lamar University. George had learned about these "government surplus" auctions while an intern at the Johnson Space Center.

On July 20, 2019, the 50th anniversary of the first moonwalk, the three tapes were sold to an undisclosed buyer for 1.82 million USD, according to Sotheby's. Although Sotheby's described these tapes as "the best surviving NASA videotape recordings of the historic Apollo 11 Moon Landing" and "the earliest, sharpest and most accurate surviving video images of man's first steps on the moon", a statement from NASA said these tapes "contain no material that hasn't been preserved at NASA".

== See also ==
- British television Apollo 11 coverage, much of which is also missing
- Lunar Orbiter Image Recovery Project

== Sources ==
- AG Staff (October 6, 2010). "Exclusive moonwalk video revealed". Australian Geographic. Sydney. Archived from the original on October 9, 2010.
- Amalfi, Carmelo (November 1, 2006). "Space Week: Lost Moon landing tapes discovered". COSMOS and The Science of Everything. Toorak, Victoria, Australia. Archived from the original on July 22, 2014.
- Barry, Carolyn (September 30, 2010). "Australian Geographic to screen lost Moon footage". Australian Geographic. Sydney. Archived from the original on July 21, 2014.
- Coan, Paul M. (November 1973), "Apollo Experience Report – Television System" (PDF), in Jones, Eric M.; Glover, Ken (eds.), Apollo Lunar Surface Journal, Washington, DC: NASA, archived (PDF) from the original on October 2, 2014, "Originally published by NASA HQ as NASA Technical Note TN-A7476."
- Hansen, Kathryn (October 2006). "Missing tapes could reveal clearer moon". Geo Times. Alexandria, Virginia: The American Geosciences Institute. Archived from the original on July 26, 2014.
- Jacobs, Bob; Hess, Mark (July 16, 2009). "NASA Releases Restored Apollo 11 Moonwalk Video". NASA Press Release Archives (Press release). Washington, D.C. Archived from the original on November 22, 2013.
- Lebar, Stanley; Hoffman, Charles P. (March 6, 1967), "TV show of the century: A travelogue not atmosphere" (PDF), in Jones, Eric M.; Glover, Ken (eds.), Apollo Lunar Surface Journal, Washington, DC: NASA, archived (PDF) from the original on October 2, 2014, "Originally published in ELECTRONICS, published by McGraw Hill (1967)."
- Macey, Richard (August 5, 2006a). "One giant blunder for mankind: how NASA lost moon pictures". The Sydney Morning Herald. Archived from the original on September 23, 2014.
- Macey, Richard (August 17, 2006b). "NASA orders search for missing moonwalk tape". The Sydney Morning Herald. Archived from the original on September 24, 2015.
- MacKellar, Colin (2005). "Comparison photographs of the Apollo 11 Lunar Television as seen at Goldstone, Honeysuckle Creek, Parkes and Houston" (PDF). Sydney: honeysucklecreek.net. Archived (PDF) from the original on September 24, 2015.
- MacKellar, Colin (2006). "The Moonwalks as seen at Honeysuckle Creek". Sydney: honeysucklecreek.net. Archived from the original on August 1, 2016.
- MacKellar, Colin (2008). "The Honeysuckle Creek Super 8 footage" (PDF). Sydney: honeysucklecreek.net. Archived (PDF) from the original on March 15, 2016.
- MacKellar, Colin (2009). "The search for the Apollo 11 TV Tapes". Sydney: honeysucklecreek.net. Archived from the original on December 2, 2014.
- Nafzger, Richard (November 2, 2009), The Apollo 11 Telemetry Data Recordings: A Final Report (PDF), Washington, DC: NASA, archived (PDF) from the original on August 2, 2014
- O'Neal, James E. (August 6, 2009c). "Search for Missing Recordings Ends". TV Technology. New York: NewBay Media. Archived from the original on October 19, 2013.
- Perlman, Robert Z. (July 17, 2009). "NASA Erased First Moonwalk Tapes, But Restores Copies". Space.com. New York. Archived from the original on July 27, 2014.
- Sarkissian, John (May 21, 2006). "The search for the Apollo 11 SSTV tapes" (PDF). CSIRO Parkes Observatory. Archived (PDF) from the original on May 12, 2012.
- SPACE.com Staff (September 28, 2010). "'Lost' Footage of First Moonwalk to Screen in Australia". Space.com. New York. Archived from the original on July 27, 2014.
- Steven-Boniecki, Dwight (2010). Live TV From the Moon. Burlington, Ontario: Apogee Books. ISBN 978-1-926592-16-9.
- Von Baldegg, Kasia Cieplak-Mayr (July 20, 2012). "1 Small Step for a Cam: How Astronauts Shot Video of the Moon Landing". The Atlantic. Washington, DC. Archived from the original on October 14, 2013.
- Windley, Jay (2011). "Technology: TV Quality". Moon Base Clavius. Salt Lake City, Utah: Clavius.org. Archived from the original on January 3, 2012.
- Wheeler, Larry (September 24, 2006). "NASA hopes archives have map to Moon". Florida Today. Brevard County, Florida. Archived from the original on October 16, 2006.
- Wood, Bill (1996–2013), "Apollo Television" (PDF), in Jones, Eric M.; Glover, Ken (eds.), Apollo Lunar Surface Journal, Washington, DC: NASA
