= List of Lorne Greene's New Wilderness episodes =

Lorne Greene's New Wilderness was a wildlife documentary series that ran from 1982 to 1987 with 104 episodes.

== Season 1: 1982–1983 ==
No. in season	Title	Original release date
1	"The Hunters of Chubut"	September 14, 1982
On the rugged coast of Argentina, Sea Lions battle one another to breed and to survive attacks from Killer Whales.
2	"A Love story, the Canada Goose"	September 21, 1982
The Canada Goose's persistence in surviving various threats from other animals and man is examined.
3	"The Wild Man of the Forest--The Orangutan"	September 28, 1982
The work of a female Borneo research station employee who returns Orangutans to the jungle is documented.
4	"Super Bear--The Grizzly"	October 5, 1982
The awesome strength of the Grizzly Bear is observed in Alaska.
5	"The Cheetah: Mother on the Run"	October 12, 1982
A vulnerable African Cheetah mother fights for her life.
6	"Old Dog, New Tricks"	October 19, 1982
The new ways the Coyote is adapting to mankind's wiles are examined.
7	"The Elephant People"	October 26, 1982
With the help of mankind, a month-old Elephant races across the flood desert of Southwest Africa to find his missing family.
8	"Heart of a Lion"	November 2, 1982
Outcast Lions that live a very different lifestyle from other animals of their type are examine.
9	"Demon Dogs"	November 9, 1982
A look at the wild dogs who have joined on the plains called the Serengeti.
10	"Elk, Mother Nature's Lonesome Cowboys"	November 16, 1982
Two Elk battle for the right to breed, then the winner tries to survive the harsh winter season.
11	"Prisoners of the Dunes"	November 23, 1982
The sand dunes of southwest Africa's Namib Desert, whose evolution was frozen 50 million years ago and produced some highly unusual creatures, are examined.
12	"Army Ants, Sisterhood of Fear"	November 30, 1982
A trip into the jungles of Columbia to meet the Hamatum, a tribe of nomadic ants.
13	"Five Seasons of the Fox"	December 7, 1982
The secret lives of three generations of Red Foxes are examined.
14	"The Scariest Place on Earth"	December 14, 1982
Mammals fight with reptiles for control of the gloomy Columbia rain forest along the Putamayo River.
15	"Master Hunter of the Night"	January 4, 1983
The Great Horned Owl, one of the most famed predators in nature, is profiled.
16	"Highrise Jungle"	January 11, 1983
A look at a squirrel monkey's struggle for life in a Brazilian rainforest.
17	"Death on the Wing"	January 18, 1983
A young Golden Eagle manages to survive all of nature's hazards until it encounters the bright, hot Texas sun.
18	"Close Encounters of the Deep Kind"	January 25, 1983
Intelligent Humpbacked Whales are forced to evade pirate whaling ships and Killer Whales to reach their feeding waters.
19	"Soft wWite Death"	February 1, 1983
The animal residents of Churchill, Manitoba - dubbed the Polar Bear capital of the world.
20	"Cry Wolf"	February 8, 1983
A Wolf pack battles against man and the elements in a desperate bid to avoid extinction.
21	"Bald Eagle Rising"	February 15, 1983
A look at the bald eagle, which is on the edge of extinction but making a comeback with a little help from its human friends.
22	"Treacherous Paradise"	February 22, 1983
This week's episode looks at life on a coral reef in the Pacific.
23	"The Beach Invaders"	March 1, 1983
The Northern Elephant seal whose escape from extinction is posing a new problem for both itself and mankind, is profiled.
24	"Tuxedo Junction"	March 8, 1983
The penguins and other birds residing in the Falkland Islands.
25	"Tales of the Snow Monkey"	March 15, 1983
The adaptations of the Japanese Snow Monkey to snow conditions for the purpose of survival is examined.
26	"The Perilous Voyage"	March 22, 1983
A young Fur Seal makes a run for survival to the North barely escaping hunters along the way.

== Season 2: 1983–1984 ==
No. in season	Title	Original release date
1	"The Jaws of Life"	September 27, 1983
The last remaining Nile Crocodiles are studied on the swampy shoreline of Kenya's Lake Turkhana.
2	"Builders of the World"	October 4, 1983
Threats, including predatory animals and flash flood, endanger a family of Beavers trying to build a new home.
3	"The Big Sting"	October 11, 1983
The battle to contain African Killer Bees in South America is examined.
4	"Gauntlet Beach"	October 18, 1983
The last giant sea turtles fight to survive against man and nature.
5	"The Great Capelin Caper"	October 25, 1983
The springtime return of Capelin to the cold water of Newfoundland is highlighted.
6	"A Tale of Two Leopards"	November 1, 1983
A male Leopard's return to his home in southern Kenya places him, a female Leopard and her cub in jeopardy.
7	"Living Lightning"	November 8, 1983
The Peregrine Falcon, a predator being saved from extinction in North America's southern regions, is examined.
8	"Swamp Things"	November 15, 1983
The unusual waters of the Florida Everglades are visited.
9	"Song of the North"	November 22, 1983
Wildlife that flourishes during Alaska's brief summer.
10	"Keeper of the Glades"	November 29, 1983
A visit to Florida's Everglades and a look at the alligators which create the waterholes that keep all the creatures of the swamp alive through winter's drought.
11	"Wild Horses"	December 6, 1983
Wild Stallions in Nevada battle for mares and face off against man, their greatest enemy.
12	"Bonecrusher"	December 13, 1983
The plains of Africa is the setting for this look at nature's most brutal creatures, the Hyena.
13	"Saturday Morning Live"	January 10, 1984
Today: the desert rattlesnake and the roadrunner.
14	"Big Bird"	January 17, 1984
A visit to the Serengeti Plains to watch ostriches mate and raise their young.
15	"Get Along with Little Doggies"	January 24, 1984
A rancher nearly wipes out a whole food chain in his efforts to rid his ranch of Prairie Dogs.
16	"Summer Ice"	January 31, 1984
Antarctica, the seventh continent, is visited to observe Adelie Penguins breed on the summer ice.
17	"Last of the Monsters"	February 28, 1984
An octopus battles its under sea enemy and a moray eel presents its survival skills of going from camouflage to combat.
19	"Wild in the City"	March 6, 1984
A family of Raccoons take over an attic and learn to survive the dangers of the asphalt jungle.
20	"Planet of the Baboons"	March 13, 1984
A Baboon "king" faces a bloody challenge to his throne.
21	"The Vampire Strikes Back"	March 20, 1984
The mysteries, myths and fears surrounding the Vampire Bat are explored.
TBA	"The California Rough Riders"	TBA
Travels to the coast of California where a sea otter and her pup ride the Pacific Ocean's rough waters to evade predatory white sharks.
22	"Jackal be Nimble"	June 12, 1984
A visit to the Serengeti Plains to witness a year in the life of a Golden Jackal.

== Season 3: 1984–1985 ==
No. in season	Title	Original release date
1	"Like Cats and Dogs"	September 25, 1984
A comparison of the behavior of Bobcats and Coyote with their domestic counterparts, pet cats and dogs.
2	"The Bottom Line"	October 2, 1984
An exploration of the sometimes unorthodox behavior of animals that inhabit the coral reef.
3	"Pretty Poison"	October 9, 1984
A look at the annual migration of Monarch butterflies.
4	"Devil Island : Survival Tactics of the Mona Iguana"	October 16, 1984
Featuring a trip to Mona Island in the Caribbean for a visit with one of the world's largest lizards.
5	"Inky, Dinky Spider"	October 23, 1984
Inky, Dinky, Spider. A visit to the Florida Everglades to watch spiders feed on insects.
6	"Frozen Eden"	October 30, 1984
A visit to Ungava peninsula to watch the world's last great caribou herd on its annual migration.
7	"The Claws of the Fisherman"	November 6, 1984
A visit to Florida to look at how the osprey which once thrived in the almost ideal environment of Florida Bay now grapples with a fight for survival.
8	"Huntress"	November 13, 1984
A young cougar is driven from the family den in the Colorado Rockies and searches for a new home.
9	"The Cuddly Plague"	November 20, 1984
The story of how half a billion rabbits overran Australia and transformedpasture into desert.
10	"The Rise of the Great Salt Lake"	November 27, 1984
An examination into the threat to wildlife posed by the continually rising water level of Utah's Great Salt Lake.
11	"Yesterday's Heroes"	December 4, 1984
A look at Australia and how the last of the wild horses, donkeys and camels are struggling to survive.
12	"Bird Wars"	December 11, 1984
Off the coast of California, rival flocks of nesting gulls and terns battle for territorial rights and survival.
13	"The Ascent of Chimps. / Part I"	January 8, 1985
A look at the Chimpanzee community at the Arnhem Zoo in the Netherlands, where the animals display qualities of human behavior.
14	"White Lightning"	January 15, 1985
A look at a Snowy Owl's attempt to keep her offspring alive after her mate is killed.
15	"The Enchanted Forest"	January 22, 1985
A look at the battles of Red Deer stag during the autumn rut in a Yugoslavian forest.
16	"Mother Goose"	January 29, 1985
In this exploration of the world of a nature cinematographer, Canadian movie-maker Bill Garrick explains how he found a way to photograph geese in flight by building a wind tunnel big enough to accommodate a six-foot wing span.
17	"Kindness kills: Discover the Dark Secrets of the Black Bear"	February 5, 1985
The difficult problems caused by the intermingling of men and bears in Banff National Park.
18	"It's a Male's World: Baboons in a Battle of the Sexes"	February 12, 1985
A study of the male dominance of the Hamadryas Baboons of Ethiopia.

== Season 4: 1985–1986 ==
No. in season	Title	Original release date
1	"Koala"	September 10, 1985
A look at two Koala’s struggle for survival.
2	"Goin' South"	September 17, 1985
This exploration of migration follows a young red-tailed hawk's flight from Quebec to Florida.
3	"The Ascent of the Chimps. / Part II"	September 24, 1985
A visit to the Arnhem Zoo where an older male chimp tries to take over as leader.
4	"Upstairs/Downstairs"	October 1, 1985
A profile of New Zealand's unique bird population including the New Zealand Falcon, Harrier Hawk and Royal Spoonbill.
5	"Heart of Africa. / Part I"	October 8, 1985
The Wildebeests of Africa try to dodge scavengers including Hyenas, Lions, Cheetahs and Wild Dogs.
6	"Heart of Africa. / Part II"	October 15, 1985
Herds of Wildebeests in Africa trek southward and face the risksof floods and droughts.
7	"Catch a Falling Stork"	October 22, 1985
A vicious summer storm endangers the local stork population in southern Hungary and the villagers go on a rescue mission.
8	"Life and Times of the Badger Twins"	October 29, 1985
A look at two badger orphans as they help each other to maturity.
9	"Termites of Endearment"	November 19, 1985
The huge, fortress like structures of East Africa's termites are examined.
10	"So Long, King Kong"	November 26, 1985
Scientists become friends with a family of Mountain Gorillas in the volcanic mountain ranges of central Africa.
11	"Big Bird Blues"	December 3, 1985
Great Blue Herons battle hunger while raising their young along the St. Lawrence River.
12	"Running Dogs"	December 17, 1985
A Dingo, the Australian wild dog, makes a dash for freedom.
13	"Shrinking Giant"	January 7, 1986
An examination of how the ivory trade is destroying African elephants.
14	"The Devil's Last Stand"	January 14, 1986
A female Tasmanian Devil is followed as she struggles to survive in a hostile environment.
15	"Action of the Tiger"	January 28, 1986
The traditional methods of hunting down a man-eating Tiger and a Tigress pursuit of wild game are the focus of this look at the return from near-extinction of India's Tigers.
16	"Odd Bird Out"	February 4, 1986
The Black Stilt of New Zealand, on the brink of extinction, battles for survival.
17	"Rescue at the Shore"	February 11, 1986
A look at the techniques employed to rescue stranded whales on the beaches of Tasmania.
18	"Apes of Barbary"	March 11, 1986
Four troops of Barbary Macaques are relocated from a French zoo to the mountain wilderness of Morocco.

== Season 5: 1986–1987 ==
No. in season	Title	Original release date
1	TBA	September 9, 1986
A look at a recovery team's work preserve the rapidly disappearing California Condor from extinction.
2	TBA	September 16, 1986
A visit to the Soviet Union to explore the world of the European wolf.
3	TBA	September 23, 1986
A profile of a feral cat and its struggle to survive on the streets of London.
4	TBA	September 30, 1986
A look at Australia's kangaroo industry, described as the largest wildlife slaughter in the world.
5	TBA	October 7, 1986
A look at underwater life in a pond.
6	"Kiss of the Spider"	October 14, 1986
A male tarantula, in search for a mate, leaves the safety of his burrow to face predators and a possibly deadly in the Arizona desert.
7	"Long Live the King"	October 21, 1986
A look at obstacles faced by Atlantic Salmon: at the adults as they return to their place of birth to spawn; at the next generation as they attempt to reach the ocean.
8	TBA	October 28, 1986
West Germany's Black Forest
9	TBA	November 4, 1986
Attempts by a research team in Australian waters to capture and tag a Great White Shark.
10	TBA	November 11, 1986
A study on how Rhesus Monkeys living within Katmandu, Nepal's Buddhist and Hindu temples, have adapted to man's urban world.
11	TBA	November 18, 1986
In the Australian outback, a female buzzard reveals her method for gaining a family.
12	TBA	November 25, 1986
A young lioness matures in the semi-desert of Southwest Africa.
13	TBA	December 2, 1986
An 18-foot, one tonne crocodile returns to his ancestral breeding river in Australia only to discover that crocodiles his size are no longer welcome.
14	TBA	December 8, 1986
Brought to Finland in the 1920s theAmerican mink has flourished and multitudes of descendants in the fields and forests of Northern Finland.
15	TBA	January 13, 1987
On Midway Atoll, a look at the clumsy birds known as Laysan Albatross and why they've earned the nickname Gooney birds.
16	TBA	January 20, 1987
A young golden eagle compeyes for survival with a pine martin north of the Arctic Circle in Finland.
17	TBA	January 27, 1987
A jaguar and an ocelot travel through the Amazon jungle in Peru.
18	TBA	February 3, 1987
A young fox faces life as an orphan after his mother is poisoned.
19	TBA	February 10, 1987
A look at silver-backed jackals.
20	TBA	February 24, 1987
A look at the wild ponies of Dartmoor.
