= Lorne Greene's New Wilderness =

Canadian television nature documentary series

- Genre: Nature; Documentary
- Narrated by: Lorne Greene
- Country of origin: Canada
- Original language: English
- No. of seasons: 5
- No. of episodes: 104 (list of episodes)

Original release
- Network: CTV Television Network
- Release: 14 September 1982

Lorne Greene's New Wilderness (or just New Wilderness) is a Canadian television nature documentary series debuting 14 September 1982 starring Lorne Greene. The series initially aired on CTV but was syndicated in 80 per cent of the U.S. and 23 foreign countries. It was a follow-up to an earlier, similar 1970s documentary series entitled The Untamed World (later titled The Untamed Frontier).
