= Tales of Adventure (TV series) =

- Genre: Drama
- Country of origin: Canada
- Original language: English
- No. of seasons: 1

Production
- Running time: 30 minutes

Original release
- Network: CBC Television
- Release: 13 September 1952 – 6 March 1953

Tales of Adventure is a Canadian drama television series that aired on CBC Television from 1952 to 1953.

== Premise ==
The first six episodes were a serial version of Jules Verne's 1870 novel Twenty Thousand Leagues Under the Seas, with adaptation by Ray Darby and production by Silvio Narizzano. This was followed by The Moonstone, an 1868 Wilkie Collins novel adapted by Michael Jacot and produced by David Green. The next serial was "Roger Sudden" by Thomas Raddall, produced by Lloyd Brydon; this ran from 5 December 1952 until the following month. "The Mysterious Island" by Jules Verne ran from 30 January to 6 March 1953.

== Scheduling ==
This half-hour series was broadcast on Saturdays at 7:30 p.m. from 13 September to 8 November 1952. Episodes then moved to a Friday 7:30 p.m. time slot from 14 November 1952 to 6 March 1953. After this, Space Command was introduced in the time slot.

== See also ==
- List of underwater science fiction works
