= Space Command (TV series) =

Canadian children's TV show (1953–1954)

- Genre: Children's science fiction
- Written by: Alfred Harris
- Directed by: Murray Chercover
- Starring: Bob Barclay; James Doohan; Austin Willis
- Country of origin: Canada
- Original language: English
- No. of seasons: 2

Production
- Producer: Murray Chercover
- Running time: 30 minutes

Original release
- Network: CBC Television
- Release: 13 March 1953 – 29 May 1954

Related
- Tales of Adventure

Space Command is a Canadian children's science fiction television adventure series that was broadcast on CBC Television between 1953 and 1954, the first time the network aired its own drama series.

Created by Alfred Harris, the series focused on the activities of young space lieutenant Frank Anderson (Robert Barclay) aboard the space ship XSW1, along with his crewmate Phil Mitchell (James Doohan, later better known as Scotty on Star Trek) and XSW1 captain Steve Cassel (Harry Geldard). Their missions dealt with various space exploration and science subjects, including sunspots, space medicine, and the search for extraterrestrial life.

The XSW1 was operated by the worldwide Space Command organization, which concerned itself with space exploration and colonization. Characters at Space Command Earth included Dr. Joseph Edmunds (Andrew Anthony), Ilene Morris (Aileen Taylor), and Dr. Fleming, (Austin Willis). Other actors appearing on the series included Joe Austin, Cec Linder, Barry Morse (later of the TV series The Fugitive and Space: 1999), and William Shatner (Star Trek).

Although short-lived, Space Command proved to be a hit dramatic program for CBC's earliest years.

== Production details ==
As stated over the end credits, Space Command originated at CBC Toronto. The show was aired live but was kinescoped to enable distribution to other stations in the CBC's fledgling television network.

Accurate credits are difficult to assemble because only a single episode is known to survive and documentation of the program is scant. The existing episode's technical credits are: Producer Murray Chercover; Technical Producer Vic Ferry. Audio Orm Collier; Sound Effects Bill McCelland; Production Supervisor Robert Allen; Special Effects John D. Lowry and Peter Kirby, which included presentations of rockets and weightlessness.

Other sources identify the Producer as Ross McLean and lists the Director as Murray Chercover. The only known Writer credit is Alfred Harris. Harold Wright was technical advisor to the series. Models were created at producer Murray Chercover's residence, and rocket propulsion material was obtained from T. W. Hand Fireworks.

== Scheduling ==
The series was initially seen on Friday evenings at 19:30 Eastern time on CBLT channel 9 in Toronto. The debut episode on 13 March 1953 featured the topic of sunspots. This first run continued until 17 July 1953. Other topics planned for the series included asteroids, space medicine, meteorites, and evolution.

Initially, the only other CBC Television station was CBFT in Montreal, broadcasting in English and French until the launch of CBMT. During Space Command's run CBOT went on the air in Ottawa on 2 June 1953 and the three stations were networked via microwave. Other CBC stations that signed on while the show was in production and which may have carried the programme for at least part of its run were CKSO Sudbury, Ontario (25 October 1953), CFPL London, Ontario (28 November 1953), CBUT Vancouver (16 December 1953), CBMT in Montreal (10 January 1954), CKCO in Kitchener, Ontario (1 March 1954), CBAT in Saint John, New Brunswick (22 March 1954), and possibly CBWT Winnipeg (31 May 1954).

From 17 October 1953, the series moved to Saturdays at 18:30, but came back to CBC's Friday schedule on 8 January 1954 for the 18:00 time slot. The final run of the series returned to Saturdays on 1 May 1954, again at the 18:00 time slot. The total number of episodes is undocumented, but the show aired for 51 weeks in total, and if it aired only once weekly the maximum number of episodes would be 51 and claims that report a series length of 150 episodes must be in error.

== Preservation status ==
Nova Scotia media historian Ernest Dick lamented the loss of recordings of nearly all the series episodes, despite the production of kinescopes for distribution to CBC stations across Canada. The only known extant recording is that of one November 1953 episode. That segment was uploaded to YouTube in March 2018, bearing a modern Canadian TV Classification System TV rating of PG, indicating it must have been rebroadcast no earlier than 1997.
