= John D. Lowry =

Film restoration expert

John D. Lowry (June 2, 1932 – January 21, 2012) was a Canadian film restoration expert and innovator who founded Lowry Digital Images in 1988. His film restoration company, headquartered in Burbank, California, has been credited with restoring, preserving, and, in many cases, saving early Hollywood films which may have otherwise deteriorated beyond retrieval. Lowry developed his own techniques and technology, called the Lowry Process, which, as defined by the Los Angeles Times reduces "visual 'noise' in motion pictures" which then makes it possible to undertake other forms of restoration, such as removing dirt and scratches, reducing flicker. and sharpening the quality of existing images. Lowry used his process to restore and preserve more than five hundred classic films, including Singin' in the Rain, Star Wars Episode IV: A New Hope, Casablanca, Snow White and the Seven Dwarfs, Raiders of the Lost Ark, Indiana Jones and the Temple of Doom, Indiana Jones and the Last Crusade, Bambi, Sunset Boulevard, and the James Bond film franchise.

He was also the founder of TrioScopics 3D along with Ian Cavén, back in February 2007.

== Life and career ==
Lowry was born in 1932 in Peterborough, Ontario, Canada. Though he later lived in California, Lowry remained a part-time resident of Peterborough throughout his life. At age 20, Lowry toured the television studio for the Canadian Broadcasting Corporation (CBC)'s station in Toronto, which had not made its broadcast debut yet. He quickly found a job at the fledgling station as a stagehand with the weather department.

Less than one year later, Lowry helped to found the Canadian Broadcasting Corp's first special effects department. He created the effects for some of effects for the CBC's earliest shows, including Space Command. He left CBC after nine years and founded his own production company to create television commercials.

In January 2012, the Academy of Motion Picture Arts and Sciences announced that it would honor Lowry and several other individuals involved in the development of the Lowry System at the Academy Scientific and Technical Award ceremony on February 11, 2012. Lowry's fellow honorees included Ian Cavén, Tim Connolly, Ian Godin, and Kimball Thurston. The Academy would bestow the Academy Plaque, a scientific award, to the group for "the development of a unique and efficient system for the reduction of noise and other artifacts, thereby providing high-quality images required by the filmmaking process."

Lowry died at his home in Camarillo, California, on January 21, 2012, at the age of 79, less than two weeks after the Academy's announcement.
