= Murray Chercover =

- Born: Murray Howard Chercover; 18 August 1929; Montreal, Quebec, Canada
- Died: 3 July 2010 (aged 80); Richmond Hill, Ontario, Canada
- Education: Lorne Greene Academy of Radio Arts
- Spouse: Barbara Chercover
- Children: 2

Murray Howard Chercover (18 August 1929 – 3 July 2010) was a Canadian television producer and executive, particularly known as the president of the CTV Television Network from 1967 until 1990.

== Early life ==
Chercover was born in Montreal, Quebec, but moved with his family to Port Arthur, Ontario in his youth. There in 1944, his first broadcast job was with radio station CFPA.

== Career ==
From the late 1940s, Chercover worked in New York on various theatre and television projects. When CBC Television began in 1952, he returned to Toronto to produce and direct various programmes there including Space Command, General Motors Presents, On Camera and Ford's Playbill.

Chercover left CBC for CFTO-TV in 1960 which became the flagship station for CTV when the network began in 1961. He became the network's president in 1967. He also served as its chief operating officer in 1967, its managing director from 1968, then chief executive officer from 1986. Chercover resigned from CTV in 1990.

He died from pneumonia complications on 3 July 2010 at Hill House Hospice in Richmond Hill, Ontario.

== Awards and recognition ==
- 1986 - Canadian Association of Broadcasters Distinguished Service Gold Ribbon
- 1988 - Canadian Film and Television Association Lifetime Achievement Gold Medal
- 1990 - Banff World Television Festival Rockie Lifetime Achievement Award
- 1991 - Broadcast Executives Society Achievement Award
