= Esse Ljungh =

Canadian radio producer (1904–1991)

Esse Willem Ljungh (August 3, 1904 - February 9, 1991) was a Canadian radio producer, most noted as the longtime head of radio drama for CBC Radio.

Born in Malmö, Sweden, he emigrated to Canada in 1927. He initially settled in Radville, Saskatchewan as a farmer, but after losing his farm during the Great Depression, he moved to Winnipeg, Manitoba, where he worked as editor of a Swedish-language newspaper. He subsequently joined the Winnipeg Little Theatre, acting on stage for the first time in a production of Peer Gynt and having his first directorial experience on a production of Charles Gounod's opera Roméo et Juliette. In this era, he also served as an adjudicator for the Dominion Drama Festival.

After doing freelance production work for the CBC since 1938, he joined the network as a staff producer in 1942. In 1946 he began working in the drama department under Andrew Allan, and became head of the department in 1957. He was briefly also the supervisor of CBC television drama in 1959, but remained in that role for only about a year.

He left the CBC in 1969, and subsequently taught theatre at Mount Royal College and the University of Victoria. After retiring from teaching he moved to Kingston, Ontario, where he died in 1991.

He was one of the winners of ACTRA's John Drainie Award in 1968. He was inducted into the Canadian Association of Broadcasters Hall of Fame, and was named a member of the Order of Canada in 1981.
