= Les Rubie =

Canadian film and television actor

Les Rubie (July 19, 1916 - March 27, 1994) was a Canadian film and television actor. He was best known for his longtime role as a supporting member of the Wayne & Shuster comedy troupe in the 1950s and 1960s, and his later role as grocer "Mr. Hall", opposite Carol Robinson's "Penelope", in a series of Lottario commercials in the 1980s.

Originally from Nobleford, Alberta, he first became interested in acting while serving in the Canadian Armed Forces during World War II, performing in comedic sketches for his fellow soldiers. Following the war he studied at the Lorne Greene Academy of Radio Arts in Toronto.

Rubie also had a number of supporting roles in film, television and radio throughout his career, as well as starring in the Academy Award-nominated short film Bravery in the Field.
