= Lowry Digital =

US digital film restoration company

- Industry: Film restoration
- Founded: 1988; 38 years ago
- Headquarters: Burbank, California; USA
- Key people: John D. Lowry, founder Ramki Sankaranarayanan, President
- Parent: Reliance Entertainment

Lowry Digital is a digital film restoration company based in Burbank, California. John D. Lowry (2 June 1932 – 21 January 2012) was a Canadian film restoration expert and innovator who founded Lowry Digital Images in 1988.

== Company History ==
John D. Lowry was a Canadian film restoration expert and innovator who founded Lowry Digital Images in 1988.

Lowry Digital Image was largely shaped by the needs of its first studio clients. The company was known as DTS Digital Images while it was owned by digital audio company DTS from 2005 to 2008. It then changed its name to Lowry Digital in April 2008, when it was acquired by India's Reliance MediaWorks, which is part of the Reliance ADA Group owned by Indian businessman Anil Ambani. Lowry Digital was later acquired by Prime Focus Technologies (PFT) as part of a merger of the film and media services business of Reliance MediaWorks (the media & entertainment arm of Reliance Group) and Prime Focus Ltd (PFL), a public limited company.

The Lowry Digital Process was honored by the Academy of Motion Picture Arts and Sciences in the Scientific and Technical awards category in 2012.

== Workflow Pipeline ==
John D. Lowry gained industry recognition in 2008 for his computer-based proprietary algorithms used in the restoration of the NASA Apollo 16 and 17 mission films. As of December 15, 2006, Lowry Digital had 700 Apple Power Mac G5s, a server bay with 700 terabytes of storage and two $300,000 digital motion picture film scanners.

The company is becoming increasingly involved in work on digital 3-D films, such as U2 3D and Journey to the Center of the Earth 3-D. Lowry Digital used new and existing technology for 3-D production in Avatar. The company was lauded for helping Avatar – the highest-grossing film in history – to earn its Academy Awards for technical achievement.

Lowry describes the restoration process as overcoming three obstacles: wear and tear, age, and multiple generations of optical copies. Each frame is scanned into a high-resolution digital format, where the computer first checks for common problems. Then the files go through the lab's render farm for dirt removal, which is then checked frame-by-frame by a human operator. The system works natively in a 32-bit floating-point, can process any format like HD and 4K, and outputs to a pristine digital master. Lowry Digital's advanced digital image processing is also used to minimize grain without losing any quality, even in modern major motion picture releases like Miami Vice and Zodiac.

On 16 July 2009, in time for the 40th anniversary of the Moon landing, NASA tasked Lowry Digital to restore original video footage of the missing Apollo Moon landing tapes at a price of $230,000. Lowry president Mike Inchalik commented that the video was "far and away from the lowest quality" the company has dealt with.

== Marquee Projects ==
- The Simpsons: Upconversion from SD to HD in 4:3 and 16:9 with tilt and pan for 342 episodes of the series.
- NASA: Restoration of the original video footage of the missing Apollo moon landing tapes, in time for the 40th anniversary of the moon landing on 16 July 2009.
- Prometheus: In addition to grain reduction and image processing, all 3D related issues were fixed, and the Z axis was made acceptable for theatrical release.
- Star Wars: The first three Star Wars feature films were all scanned at 4K with full restoration including stabilization, grain reduction, and dust & dirt removal.
- Avatar & Titanic: In addition to image processing and grain reduction, Z axis issues that had occurred during the original 3D shooting were fixed.
- Disney: Short films and classic films like Dumbo, Snow White, Cinderella, Sleeping Beauty, "Pinocchio" and several others were scanned at 4K, color corrected and restored. Dirt and dust were removed from each of these films, and scratches and grains were cleaned up.

== Films worked on ==
- Avatar (2009)
- The Curious Case of Benjamin Button (2008)
- Journey to the Center of the Earth 3-D (2008)
- U2 3D (2007)
- Zodiac (2007)
- Miami Vice (2006)
- Aliens of the Deep (2005)
- Die Another Day (2002)
- Pokémon Heroes (2002, 2003)
- Pokémon 4Ever (2001, 2002)
- Pokémon 3: The Movie (2000, 2001)
- Pokémon: The Movie 2000 (1999, 2000)
- The World Is Not Enough (1999)
- Pokémon: The First Movie (1998, 1999)
- Tomorrow Never Dies (1997)
- Star Trek: First Contact (1996)
- GoldenEye (1995)
- The Lion King (1994)
- Born Too Soon (1993)
- Aladdin (1992)
- Beauty and the Beast (1991)
- The Godfather Part III (1990)
- Licence to Kill (1989)
- The Little Mermaid (1989)
- Indiana Jones and the Last Crusade (1989)
- Henry V (1989)
- Oliver & Company (1988)
- The Animated Book of Mormon (1988–1992)
- The Living Daylights (1987)
- Star Trek IV: The Voyage Home (1986)
- A View to a Kill (1985)
- The Black Cauldron (1985)
- Prizzi's Honor (1985)
- Indiana Jones and the Temple of Doom (1984)
- Octopussy (1983)
- Return of the Jedi (1983)
- The Keep (1983)
- The Fox and the Hound (1981)
- For Your Eyes Only (1981)
- Raiders of the Lost Ark (1981)
- The Empire Strikes Back (1980)
- The In-Laws (1979)
- Moonraker (1979)
- The Rescuers (1977)
- The Spy Who Loved Me (1977)
- Star Wars (1977)
- All the President's Men (1976)
- The Godfather Part II (1974)
- The Man with the Golden Gun (1974)
- Live and Let Die (1973)
- Robin Hood (1973)
- The Private Life of Sherlock Holmes (1973)
- The Godfather (1972)
- Diamonds Are Forever (1971)
- THX 1138 (1971)
- The Aristocats (1970)
- On Her Majesty's Secret Service (1969)
- Once Upon a Time in the West (1968)
- The Mercenary (1968)
- The Love Bug (1968)
- The Jungle Book (1967)
- You Only Live Twice (1967)
- Doctor Zhivago (1965)
- Darling (1965)
- The Great Race (1965)
- Thunderball (1965)
- Goldfinger (1964)
- Mary Poppins (1964)
- From Russia with Love (1963)
- Dr. No (1962)
- One Hundred and One Dalmatians (1961)
- The Absent-Minded Professor (1961)
- North by Northwest (1959)
- Sleeping Beauty (1959)
- The Curse of Frankenstein (1957)
- The Spirit of St. Louis (1957)
- Giant (1956)
- Moby Dick (1956)
- Lady and the Tramp (1955)
- The Rose Tattoo (1955)
- Them! (1954)
- Peter Pan (1953)
- The Robe (1953)
- Roman Holiday (1953)
- The Importance of Being Earnest (1952)
- Singin' in the Rain (1952)
- Alice in Wonderland (1951)
- Sunset Boulevard (1950)
- Cinderella (1950)
- Madeleine (1950)
- The Passionate Friends (1949)
- Oliver Twist (1948)
- Brief Encounter (1946)
- Mildred Pierce (1945)
- Gaslight (1944)
- This Happy Breed (1944)
- Casablanca (1942)
- Now, Voyager (1942)
- Bambi (1942)
- Dumbo (1941)
- Citizen Kane (1941)
- Fantasia (1940)
- Pinocchio (1940)
- Gone with the Wind (1939)
- The Lady Vanishes (1938)
- Snow White and the Seven Dwarfs (1937)
- Young and Innocent (1937)
- Sabotage (1936)
- The Cookie Carnival (1935)
- The Scarlet Pimpernel (1934)
- The Ghoul (1933)
- Little Women (1933)
- Manhatta (1921)
