= Andrew Allan (radio executive) =

Canadian radio executive (1907–1974)

- Born: Andrew Edward Fairbairn Allan; 1907; Arbroath, Scotland, United Kingdom
- Died: 1974 (aged 66–67); Ontario, Canada
- Occupations: Canadian radio and theatre producer, director, writer
- Spouses: Dianne Foster to 1951; Linda Trenholme Ballantyne to 1955

Andrew Edward Fairbairn Allan (1907–1974), born in Arbroath, Scotland, was the national head of CBC Radio Drama from 1943 to 1955. He oversaw the work of some of the finest talents of the day—writers and actors such as Lister Sinclair, Mavor Moore, W. O. Mitchell, Jane Mallett, John Drainie, Barry Morse, Christopher Plummer, James Doohan, and many others.

Allan attempted to make the transition to television in the 1950s, but never matched the extraordinary success he'd reached in the medium of radio. He later became the first Artistic Director of the Shaw Festival (1963–65) and was a prolific freelance writer and guest commentator on CBC Radio and Television until his death.

Allan's office chair from his tenure as head of CBC Radio Drama, an old wooden armchair, is an icon at CBC Radio's Toronto headquarters. It sits on a pedestal outside of the drama recording studio and is handed down from one head of drama to the next.

In September 1939, Allan, traveling with his then-fiancée, actress Judith Evelyn, from Saskatchewan, was a survivor of the torpedoing of the SS Athenia. Mr. Allan's elderly father died in the aftermath of the disaster, when the lifeboat the three of them were in was accidentally sunk by a rescue ship. Allan and Evelyn never married. Allan married twice, while Evelyn never wed.
