= Scan conversion =

Video processing technique

Scan conversion or scan converting rate is a video processing technique for changing the vertical / horizontal scan frequency of video signal for different purposes and applications. The device which performs this conversion is called a scan converter.

The application of scan conversion is wide and covers video projectors, cinema equipment, TV and video capture cards, standard and HDTV televisions, LCD monitors, radar displays and many different aspects of picture processing.

== Mechanisms and methods ==
Scan conversion involves changing the picture information data rate and wrapping the new picture in appropriate synchronization signals. There are two distinct methods for changing a picture's data rate:

Analog Methods (Non retentive, memory-less or real time method)

This conversion is done using large numbers of delay cells and is appropriate for analog video. It may also be performed using a specialized scan converter vacuum tube. In this case polar coordinates (angle and distance) data from a source such as a radar receiver, so that it can be displayed on a raster scan (TV type) display.

Digital methods (Retentive or buffered method)

In this method, a picture is stored in a line or frame buffer with n1 speed (data rate) and is read with n2 speed, several picture processing techniques are applicable when the picture is stored in buffer memory including kinds of interpolation from simple to smart high order comparisons, motion detection and … to improve the picture quality and prevent the conversion artifacts.

== How to realize ==
The process in practice is applicable only using integrated circuits in LSI and VLSI scales. Timing, interference between digital and analog signals, clocks, noise and exact synchronization have important roles in the circuit. Digital conversion method needs the analog video signal to be converted to digital data at the first step. A scan converter can be made in its basic structure using some high speed integrated circuits as a circuit board however there are some integrated circuits which perform this function plus other picture processing functions like scissoring, change of aspect ratio and … an easy-to-use example was SDA9401.

== Some examples ==
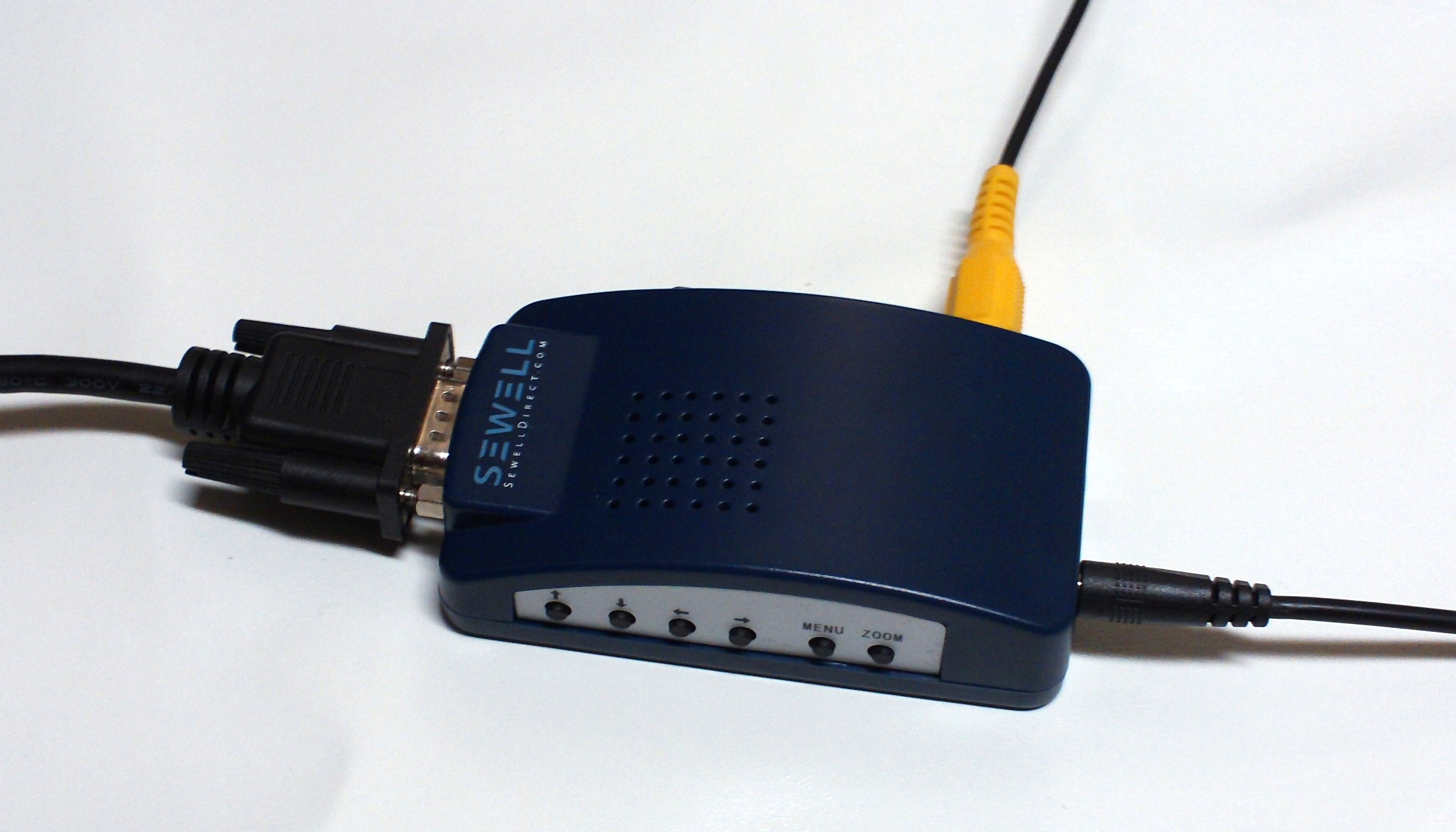
A VGA to TV scan converter box like this turns enhanced-definition or high-definition signals into standard-definition signals.

Up conversion (interpolation):

- In many LCD monitors there is a native picture mode, however the monitor can display different graphical modes using a scan converter.
- In a 100 Hz/120 Hz analog TV, there is a scan converter circuit which converts the vertical frequency (refresh rate) from standard 50/60 Hz to 100/120 Hz to achieve a low level of flicker which is important in large screen (high inch) TVs.
- An external TV card receives the TV signals and converts them to VGA or SVGA format to display on monitor.

Down conversion (decimation):

- Many graphic cards have output for standard-definition television. Here there is a conversion from computer graphical modes to TV standard formats.
- Other graphic cards lack an SDTV output, but their VGA outputs can still be connected to an SDTV through an external scan converter (pictured).

Scan conversion serves as a bridge between TV and computer graphics technology.

== See also ==
- VESA
- Analog-to-digital converter
- Digital-to-analog converter
- Video scaler
