= James Doohan =

Canadian actor (1920–2005)

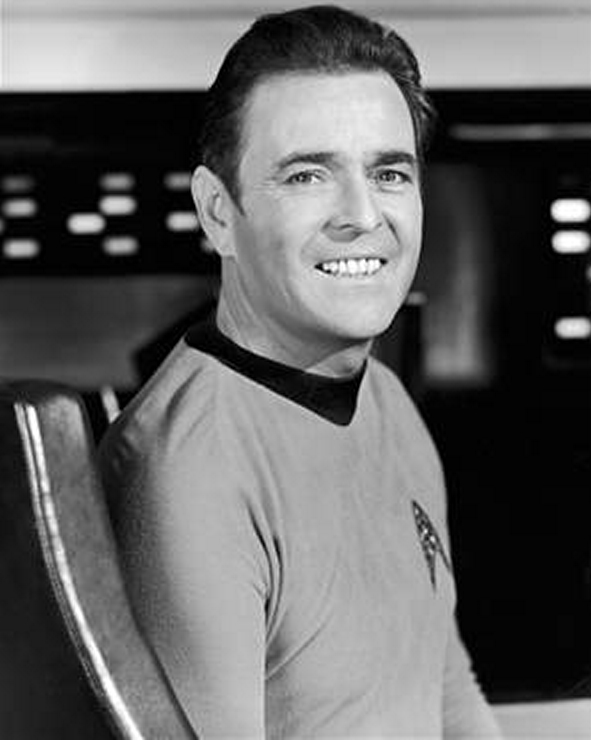
- Publicity photo of James Doohan as Scotty from the television program Star Trek
- Born: James Montgomery Doohan; March 3, 1920; Vancouver, British Columbia, Canada
- Died: July 20, 2005 (aged 85); Redmond, Washington, U.S.
- Education: Neighborhood Playhouse School of the Theatre, Lorne Greene Academy of Radio Arts
- Occupations: Actor; author
- Years active: 1952–2001
- Known for: Montgomery "Scotty" Scott
- Television: Star Trek
- Spouses: Janet Young (m. 1949; div. 1964); Anita Yagel (m. 1967; div. 1972); Wende Braunberger (m. 1974)
- Children: 7, including Chris
- Military career
- Allegiance: Canada
- Branch: Canadian Army
- Service years: 1938–1945
- Rank: Lieutenant
- Units: 2nd Canadian Infantry Division; 3rd Canadian Infantry Division; 666 (AOP) Squadron, RCAF
- Conflicts: World War II: Operation Overlord

James Montgomery Doohan (/ˈduːən/; March 3, 1920 – July 20, 2005) was a Canadian actor, best known for his role as Montgomery "Scotty" Scott in the television and film series Star Trek. Doohan's characterization of the Scottish chief engineer of the Starship Enterprise has become one of the most recognizable elements in the Star Trek franchise, and inspired many fans to pursue careers in engineering and other technical fields. He also made contributions behind the scenes, such as the initial development of the Klingon and Vulcan constructed languages.

Prior to his acting career, Doohan served in the 14th Field Artillery Regiment of the 3rd Canadian Infantry Division. He also served as an Artillery Forward Observation Officer (FOO) and pilot. He saw combat in Europe during World War II, including the D-Day invasion of Normandy, in which he was wounded, apparently by friendly fire. After the war, he had extensive experience performing in radio and television, which led to his role as Scotty. Following the cancellation of the original Star Trek series, Doohan had been typecast and had limited success in finding other roles; he returned to play the character in the animated and film continuations of the series, and made frequent appearances at Star Trek conventions.

== Early life ==
Doohan was born in Vancouver, British Columbia, the youngest of four children of William Patrick Doohan and Sarah Frances (née Montgomery), who both emigrated from Bangor, County Down, Northern Ireland. His father, William Doohan, was born in Belfast, and was a pharmacist, veterinarian and dentist, and a member of the Pharmaceutical Society of Ireland. William Doohan owned a chemist shop in Main Street in Bangor beside Trinity Presbyterian Church and reportedly invented an early form of high-octane gasoline in 1923. Doohan's 1996 autobiography recounted his father's serious alcoholism.

The family moved from Vancouver to Sarnia, Ontario. Doohan attended high school at Sarnia Collegiate Institute and Technical School, where he excelled in mathematics and science. He enrolled in the 102nd Royal Canadian Army Cadet Corps in 1938.

== Military service ==
In 1939, Doohan enlisted in the Canadian Army, joining the Royal Canadian Artillery, 14th (Midland) Field Battery of the 2nd Canadian Division. From there, he was moved to the 13th Field Regiment of the 3rd Canadian Division in their 22nd Field Battery. By 1940 he was a lieutenant and was sent to train in Britain. He first saw combat on D-Day, landing in the second wave in a reconnaissance party at Juno Beach. The 13th Field Regiment was interspersed with the Regina Rifle Regiment landing at Nan Sector of Juno Beach. Doohan positioned his battery on high ground, leading them through a field of anti-tank mines, and they took defensive positions for the night. Crossing between command posts at 23:30 that night, Doohan was hit by six rounds fired from a Bren gun by a nervous Canadian sentry: four in his leg, one in the chest, and one through his right middle finger. The bullet to his chest was stopped by a silver cigarette case given to him by his brother. His right middle finger had to be amputated, something he would conceal on-screen during most of his career as an actor, sometimes with a flesh-colored glove with a faux finger.

Doohan graduated from Air Observation Pilot Course 40 with eleven other Canadian artillery officers and flew Taylorcraft Auster Mark V aircraft for 666 (AOP) Squadron, RCAF as a Royal Canadian Artillery officer in support of 1st Army Group Royal Canadian Artillery. All three Canadian (AOP) RCAF squadrons were crewed by artillery officer-pilots and accompanied by non-commissioned RCA and RCAF personnel serving as observers. Although he was never actually a member of the Royal Canadian Air Force, Doohan was once labelled the "craziest pilot in the Canadian Air Force". In the late spring of 1945, on Salisbury Plain north of RAF Andover, he slalomed a plane between telegraph poles "to prove it could be done", earning himself a serious reprimand. (Various accounts cite the plane as a Hurricane or a jet trainer; however, it was an Auster Mark IV.)

== Early acting career ==
After the war, Doohan moved to London, Ontario, for further technical education. After hearing a radio drama and believing he could do better, he recorded his voice at the local radio station, and learned about the Lorne Greene Academy of Radio Arts in Toronto. There he won a two-year scholarship to the Neighborhood Playhouse in New York City, where his classmates included Leslie Nielsen, Tony Randall, and Richard Boone.

In 1946, he had several roles for CBC radio, starting January 12. For several years, he shuttled between Toronto and New York as work demanded. He made his TV debut as a detective on the show Martin Kane, Private Eye, and appeared in 54 episodes. He estimated he performed in over 4,000 radio programs and 450 television programs during this period, and earned a reputation for versatility.

In the mid-1950s, he appeared as forest ranger Timber Tom (the northern counterpart of Buffalo Bob) in the Canadian version of Howdy Doody. Coincidentally, fellow Star Trek cast member William Shatner appeared simultaneously as Ranger Bill in the American version. Doohan and Shatner both appeared in the 1950s Canadian science fiction series Space Command. Doohan also appeared in several episodes of Hawkeye and the Last of the Mohicans in 1957–1958.

For GM Presents, he played the lead role in the CBC Television drama Flight into Danger (1956) by Arthur Hailey, and in others such as Hailey's Shadow of Suspicion (also 1956), and The Night they Killed Joe Howe (1960). (Arthur Hailey rewrote the former into the novel Runway Zero-Eight, and it was also adapted into the film Zero Hour!. This story was later satirized in Airplane!.)

Doohan's credits included The Twilight Zone (Season 4, Episode 3 "Valley of the Shadow" - 17 January 1961), GE True, Hazel ("Hazel's Highland Fling" as Gordon "Gordy" MacHeath). The Outer Limits, The Fugitive, Bewitched, Fantasy Island, Magnum, P.I., The Man from U.N.C.L.E. (Season 1, Episode 4 "The Shark Affair" - 1964 - and Season 2, Episode 20 "The Bridge of Lions Affair, Part 1" - 1966), and Bonanza. In the Bonanza episode "Gift of Water" (1962), he co-starred with actress Majel Barrett who would later play Star Trek's Nurse Christine Chapel. He played an assistant to the United States president in two episodes of Voyage to the Bottom of the Sea. He had an uncredited role in The Satan Bug (1965), appeared in the Daniel Boone episode "A Perilous Passage" (1970), appeared as a state trooper in Roger Vadim's film Pretty Maids All in a Row (1971, which was produced by Star Trek creator Gene Roddenberry), and played opposite Richard Harris in the movie Man in the Wilderness (1971).

Doohan also acted on stage, including Every Bed Is Narrow (1956) Bright Sun at Midnight (1957) and King Lear (1960) on the Crest Theatre in Toronto.

== Star Trek ==
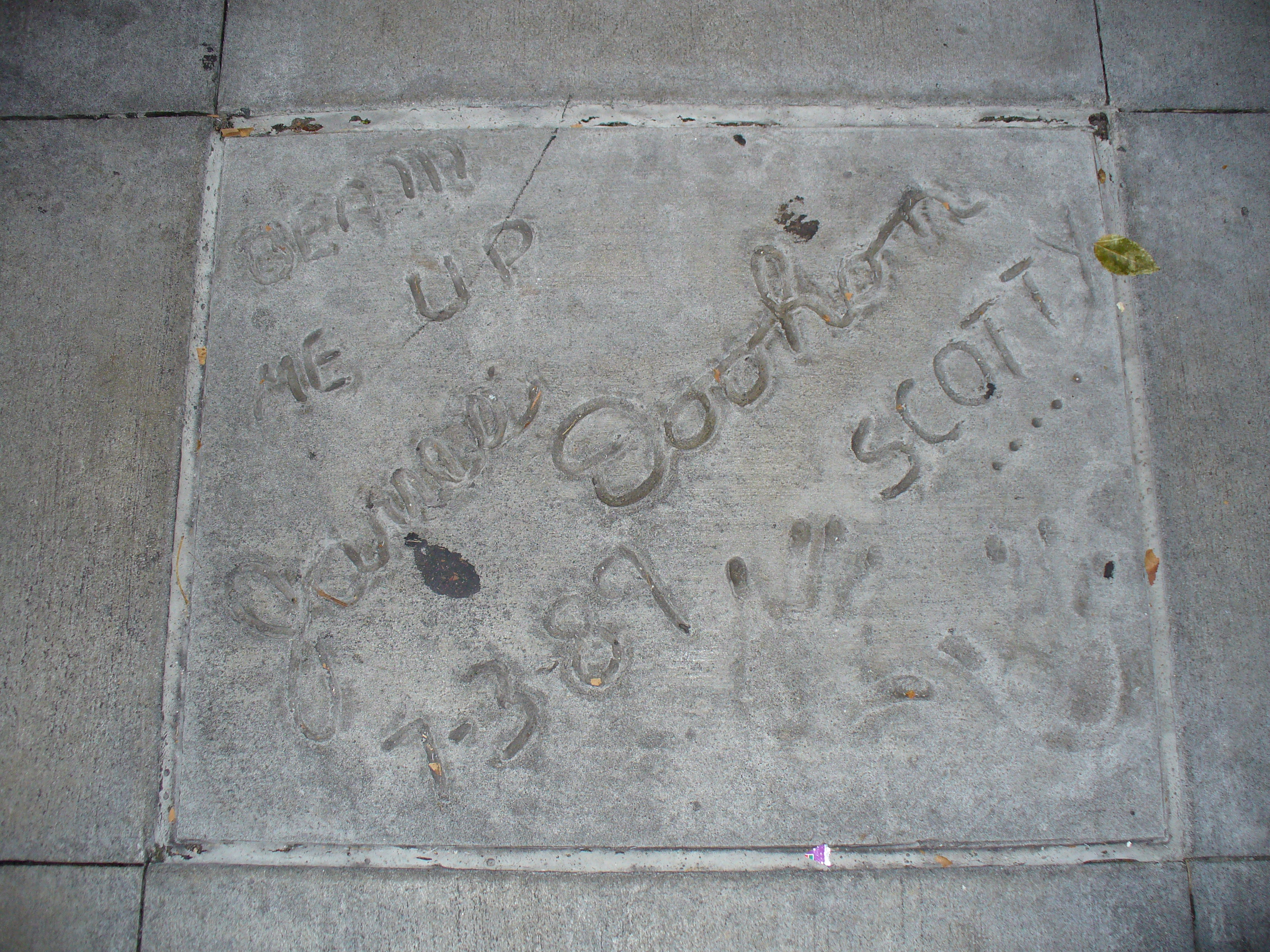
The handprints of James Doohan in front of Hollywood Hills Amphitheater at Walt Disney World's Disney's Hollywood Studios theme park

Doohan developed a talent for accents as a child. Auditioning for the role of chief engineer of the USS Enterprise, Doohan did several different accents. Producer Gene Roddenberry asked which he preferred, and Doohan replied, "If you want an engineer, in my experience the best engineers are Scotsmen." He chose the name "Montgomery Scott" after his grandfather. In later years, Doohan reenacted the casting process at Star Trek conventions, demonstrating a variety of possible voices and characters.

Doohan was quoted as saying, "Scotty is ninety-nine percent James Doohan and one percent accent." The character was originally conceived as semi-regular; but was elevated to be a regular supporting character. Doohan also provided voices for inanimate characters, including Sargon in "Return to Tomorrow", the M-5 in "The Ultimate Computer", the Mission Control Voice in "Assignment: Earth", and the Oracle in "For the World Is Hollow and I Have Touched the Sky".

Doohan returned to the role of Scotty in the early 1970s for Star Trek: The Animated Series. Walter Koenig (navigator Pavel Chekov) was not hired for this series due to budget limitations, so Doohan voiced a replacement character: alien navigator Arex. He also voiced most guest male roles, including that of Robert April, the first captain of the Enterprise and around 50 other roles, voicing as many as seven different characters in a single episode.

He rejoined the entire regular cast of Star Trek for the feature film Star Trek: The Motion Picture (1979). He continued in the role of Scotty for sequels The Wrath of Khan, The Search for Spock, The Voyage Home, The Final Frontier and The Undiscovered Country. In 1992, he guest-starred in the Star Trek: The Next Generation episode "Relics", playing an elderly Scotty reminiscing about his time on the Enterprise. He and Walter Koenig appeared briefly with William Shatner in Star Trek Generations, in a scene which transitioned the film series to the newer cast of the first of the later television series in the franchise.

The Klingon language's basic sound, along with a few words, was created by Doohan and producer Jon Povill. Doohan also devised the Vulcan dialogue for the feature film Star Trek: The Motion Picture. Kwantlen journalist Robert Jago has pointed out similarities between Klingon and Halkomelem, a language spoken by the Indigenous people of the area where James Doohan grew up.

== After Star Trek ==
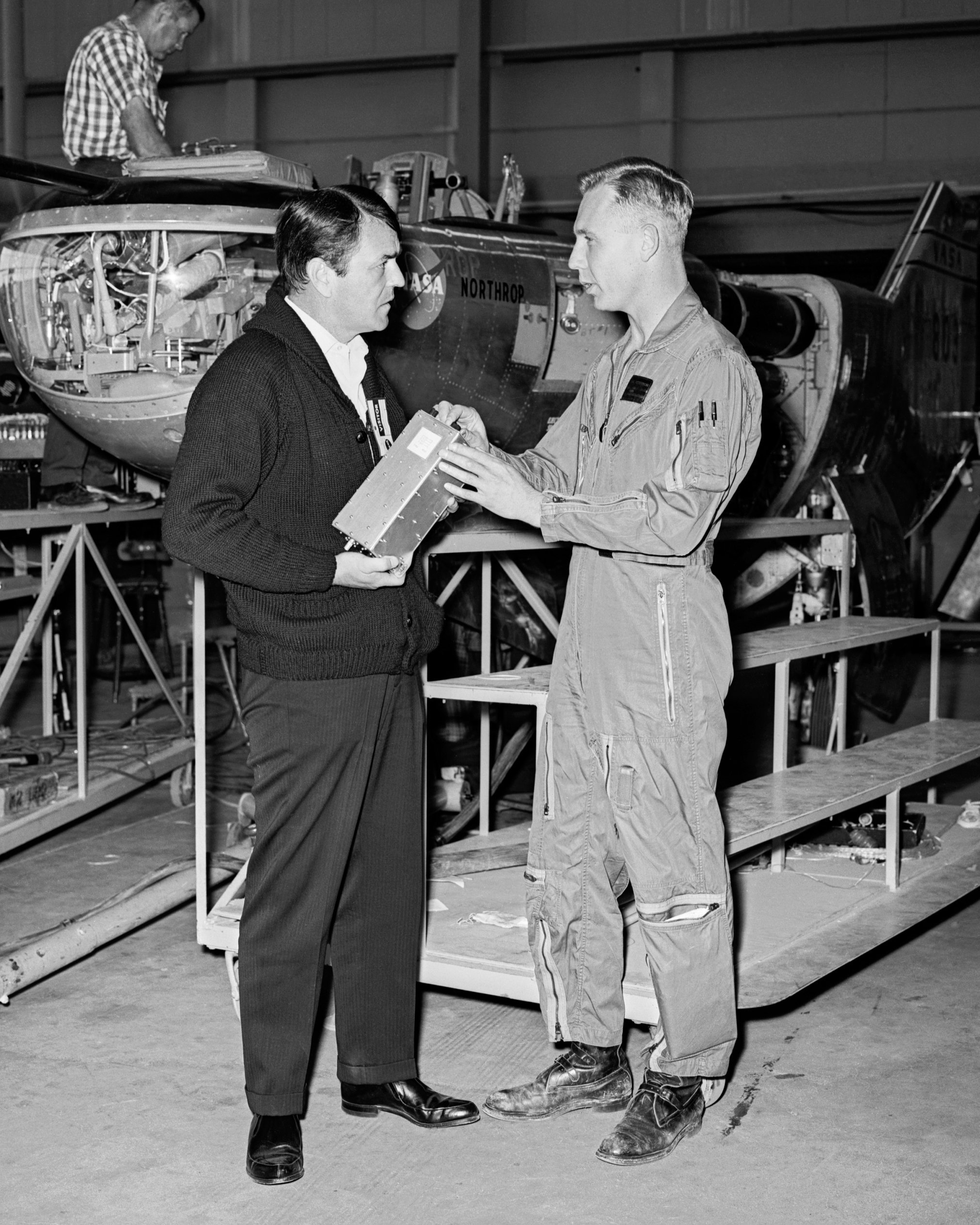
Doohan (left) visiting NASA's Dryden Flight Research Center with pilot Bruce Peterson on April 13, 1967, in front of the Northrop M2-F2

Doohan hoped that Star Trek would benefit his acting career. After the series ended, however, he found himself typecast and had a hard time gaining other roles. After his dentist reminded him he would "always be Scotty", he supported his family with income from personal appearances, speaking at more than 40 colleges in 1977 alone.

Most of the roles Doohan subsequently played made at least oblique references to his Star Trek connection and engineering reputation. He was Commander Canarvin in the short-lived Saturday morning live-action kids' show Jason of Star Command, and had a cameo in the made-for-TV movie Knight Rider 2000 as "Jimmy Doohan, the guy who played Scotty on Star Trek". On the television series Homeboys in Outer Space, he was Pippen, a pun on Scotty and basketball star Scottie Pippen. He played himself in an episode of The Ben Stiller Show. He played Damon Warwick, father of James Warwick, on the daytime soap opera The Bold and the Beautiful. After learning about cold fusion from technical journals in 1989, he narrated the video "Cold Fusion: Fire from Water", about the physics behind cold fusion.

When the Star Trek franchise was revived, Doohan reprised his role of Scotty in seven Star Trek films. Many of Doohan's film appearances centred on the role of Scotty, such as a cameo in National Lampoon's Loaded Weapon 1, where he plays a policeman doing repair work who tells his superior officer "I am giving it all she has got, Captain!" in the same accent he used in Star Trek.

Although he continued to work with William Shatner in the Star Trek films, Doohan did not get along well with him and was once quoted in 1998 as saying, "I like Captain Kirk, but I sure don't like Bill." He was the only former Star Trek co-star to decline to be interviewed by Shatner for Shatner's first Star Trek: Memories book about the show, nor did he consent to do so for Shatner's follow-up book, Star Trek: Movie Memories, though Shatner claimed in the latter that the icy relationship between the two started to thaw when both men were working on Star Trek Generations in 1993–1994. By Doohan's final August 2004 convention appearance, Doohan and Shatner reportedly had mended their relationship.

== Inspiration ==
Many fans told Doohan over the years that it was he who inspired them to choose engineering as a profession. Astronaut Neil Armstrong, an engineer before he participated in NASA's Apollo program, becoming the first man on the moon, personally told Doohan on stage at Doohan's last public appearance in 2004, "From one old engineer to another, thanks, mate."

In an interview for the first Trekkies film, Doohan related the story of a young fan who was contemplating suicide. Doohan says that he convinced her to attend his next convention appearance, and later learned that his encouragement and kind words had not only saved her life, but inspired her to go back to school and become an electronics engineer.

== Personal life ==
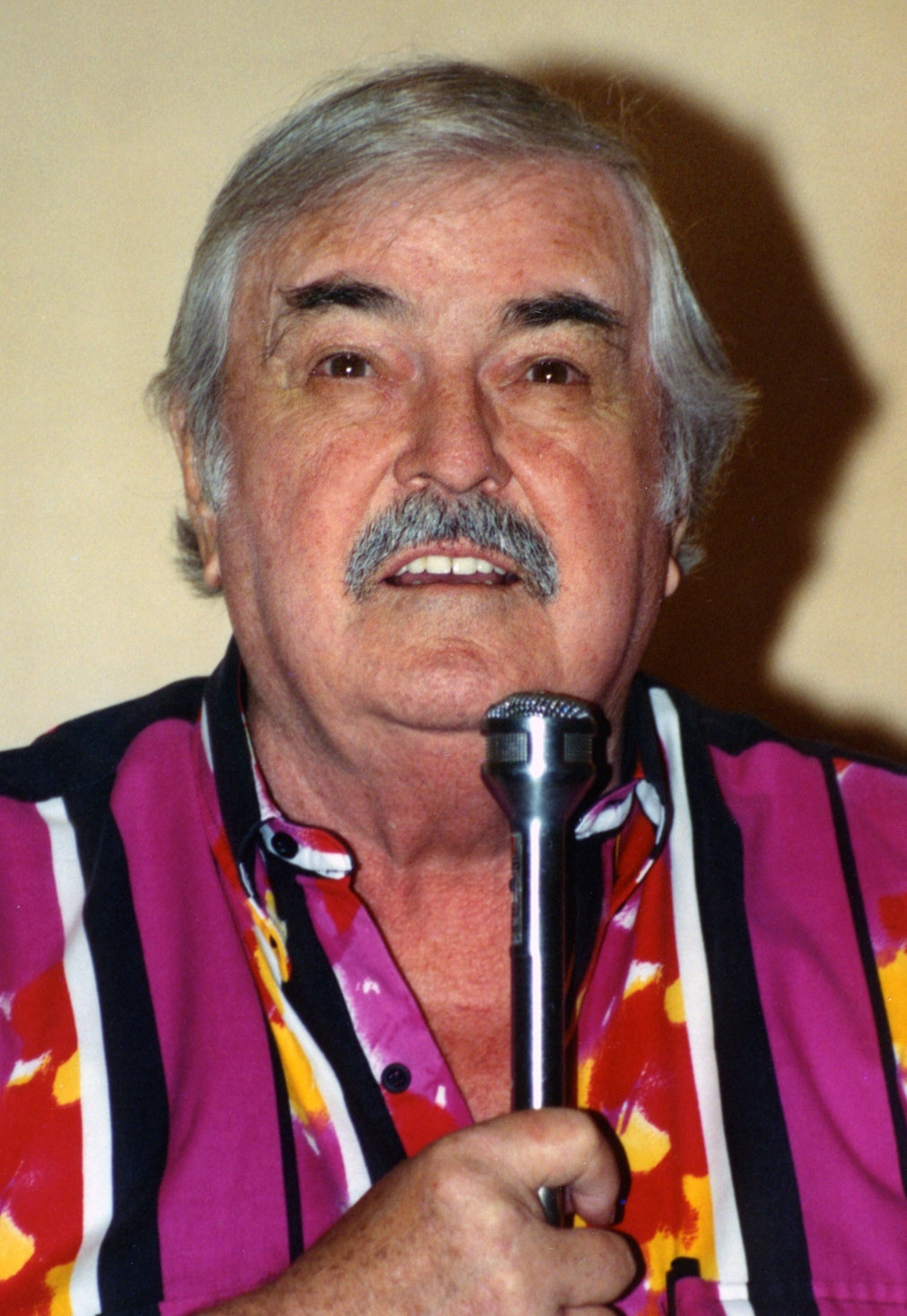
Doohan giving a speech

Doohan was married three times and had seven children, four of them—including Christopher—with his first wife Janet Young, whom he divorced in 1964. His marriage to Anita Yagel in 1967–1972 produced no children. In early 1974, he was introduced to 17-year-old fan Wende Braunberger at a theatre performance. They were married that same year, when he was 54 and she was 18, on October 12, 1974. Star Trek guest actor William Campbell served as best man. Doohan and Braunberger had three children: Eric, Thomas, and Sarah in April 2000, around his 80th birthday. In his later years, Doohan had a multitude of health problems partially from his lifestyle, which included prodigious alcohol consumption, and partially from injuries sustained during World War II. These included diabetes, liver cirrhosis, osteoarthritis, high blood pressure, and hearing loss. In July 2004, his suffering from Alzheimer's and Parkinson's disease caused him to withdraw from public life.

His sons Montgomery and Christopher appeared in Star Trek: The Motion Picture (1979). Christopher also appeared in the J. J. Abrams reboot Star Trek (2009). Simon Pegg, who played Scotty in the film, invited Chris and his family to the premiere. For Star Trek Into Darkness in 2012, fans campaigned for Christopher Doohan gaining him a credited cameo in the transporter room. Chris Doohan played Scotty in the award-winning web series Star Trek Continues.

== Death ==
On July 20, 2005, at 5:30 in the morning, Doohan died at his home in Redmond, Washington, due to complications of pulmonary fibrosis, which was believed to be from exposure to noxious substances during World War II. His body was subsequently cremated.

A portion of his ashes, ¼ ounce (7 grams), was scheduled the following fall for a memorial flight to space with 308 others, including Project Mercury astronaut Gordon Cooper. Launch on the SpaceLoft XL rocket was delayed to April 28, 2007, when the rocket briefly entered outer space in a four-minute suborbital flight before parachuting to earth, as planned, with the ashes still inside. The ashes were subsequently launched on a Falcon 1 rocket, on August 3, 2008, into what was intended to be a low Earth orbit; however, the rocket failed two minutes after launch. Some of Doohan's ashes are hidden under the floor cladding of the International Space Station's Columbus module – after being smuggled aboard in 2008 by Richard Garriott. The rest of Doohan's ashes were scattered over Puget Sound in Washington. On May 22, 2012, a small urn containing some of Doohan's ashes was flown into space aboard the Falcon 9 rocket as part of COTS Demo Flight 2.

== Legacy ==
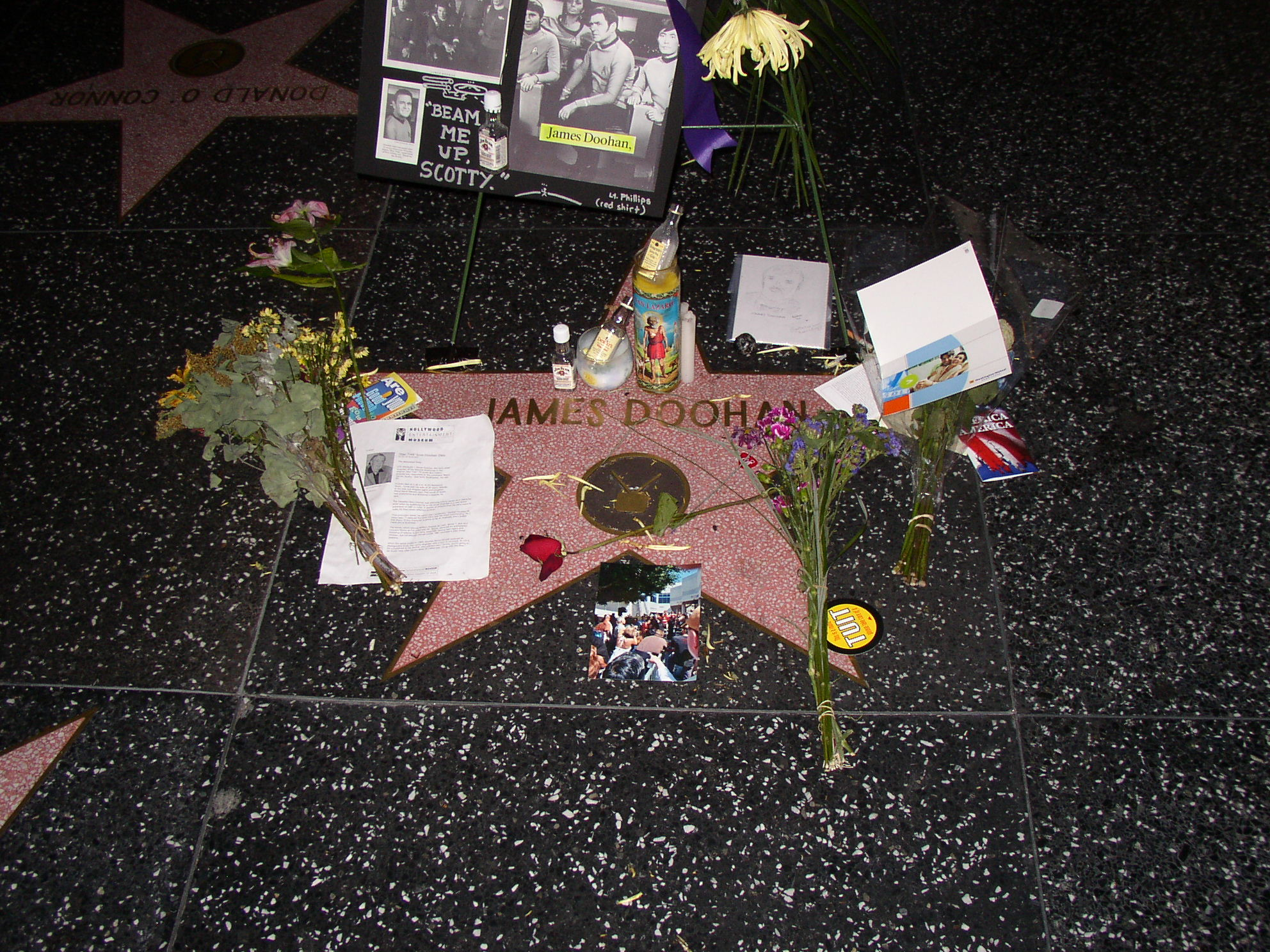
Doohan's star on Hollywood Boulevard after his death

Scotty's exploits as the Enterprise's redoubtable chief engineer inspired many students to pursue careers in engineering. Because of this, the Milwaukee School of Engineering presented Doohan with an honorary degree in engineering. Doohan received a star on the Hollywood Walk of Fame on August 31, 2004. Despite his ill health, he was present at the ceremony, which was his final public appearance.

Montgomery Scott was claimed by Linlithgow, Scotland, in 2007 by a commemorative plaque from the West Lothian Council for Doohan's importance. His birthplace is also attributed to Aberdeen, where Doohan learned the doric accent, or Elgin. In the actual show, Scotty refers to himself as a one-time "Aberdeen pub-crawler", the only reference Doohan's character ever makes to a specific place in Scotland where he lived. However, Scotty's accent chosen by Doohan is not the relatively harsh Aberdonian accent; the specific accent Doohan used implies most of Scotty's formative years were spent at or near Edinburgh, something that is supported by original script notes.

== Further Information ==
When visiting Edinburgh to appear at a Star Trek exhibition, Doohan gave an interview to the Glasgow University Guardian newspaper. In it, he recounted how he had developed his accent as Scotty. He also stated that when he appeared in the Star Trek:the Next Generation episode "Relics" he was paid more than ten times what he had received in the original series. He also told the interviewer that he did not want to be a producer or director.

== Filmography ==
=== Film ===
Year	Film	Role	Notes
1956	The Cage	Bob	National Film Board of Canada short documentary
1957	"Test Pilot"	Dave Frost	National Film Board of Canada short documentary
1963	The Wheeler Dealers	Defense Attorney	Uncredited
1964	36 Hours	Bishop	Uncredited
1964	Signpost to Murder	1st Guard	Uncredited
1965	Bus Riley's Back in Town	Les	
1965	The Satan Bug	SDI Agent at Gas Station	Uncredited
1965	Willy McBean and His Magic Machine	General Custer / Merlin / Excalibur / Royal Emcee / Leopard	voice
1966	One of Our Spies Is Missing	Phillip Bainbridge	
1966	Scalplock	Scrimp	
1968	Jigsaw	Building Superintendent	
1971	Pretty Maids All in a Row	Follo	
1971	Man in the Wilderness	Benoit	
1979	Star Trek: The Motion Picture	Montgomery Scott	
1982	Star Trek II: The Wrath of Khan	Montgomery Scott	
1984	Star Trek III: The Search for Spock	Montgomery Scott	
1986	Star Trek IV: The Voyage Home	Montgomery Scott	Nominated- Saturn Award for Best Supporting Actor
1989	Star Trek V: The Final Frontier	Montgomery Scott	
1991	Star Trek VI: The Undiscovered Country	Montgomery Scott	
1991	Star Trek Adventure	Montgomery Scott	Theme Park Attraction Short Film
1992	Double Trouble	Chief O'Brien	
1993	Loaded Weapon 1	Scotti	
1993	Amore!	Dr. Landon	
1994	Star Trek Generations	Montgomery Scott	
1996	Storybook	Uncle Monty	
1998	Bug Buster	Sheriff Carlson	
1999	Through Dead Eyes	Barney Fredericks	
1999	The Duke	Clive Chives	
2005	Skinwalker: Curse of the Shaman	Judge Peterson	Final Film Appearance

=== Television ===
Year	Title	Role	Notes
1951	Suspense	Peters	Episode: "Go Home Dead Man"
1952	Tales of Tomorrow	Sgt. Morgan	1 Episode
1953	Space Command	Phil Mitchell	TV series
1953–1955	Playbill	Suitor / Navigator	4 Episodes
1953–1961	General Motors Theatre	Various	30 episodes
1954–1958	On Camera	Various	12 episodes
1956–1957	Folio	Ted / William Annand	4 episodes
1956	Flight into Danger	George Spencer	CBC Television: broadcast April 3.
1956–1958	First Performance	Joynt	3 episodes
1957	Hawkeye and the Last of the Mohicans	Tonkawa / Harris	2 episodes
1960	R.C.M.P.	Tom Rolands / Ken McCready	3 episodes
1960	First Person	Rod Murphy	3 episodes
1961–1963	Festival	Various	5 episodes
1962	The New Breed	Dr. Lennon	2 episodes
1962	Gunsmoke	Davit	Episode: "Quint Asper Comes Home"
1962–1963	Bonanza	Bill Collins / Colonel's Man	Episodes: "Gift of Water" and "The Legacy"
1963	The Twilight Zone	Johnson	Episode: "Valley of the Shadow"
1963	Hazel	Gordon MacHeath	Episode: "Hazel's Highland Fling"
1963	GE True	Jennings	2 episodes
1963	The Gallant Men	Captain Blagdon	Episode: "The Warriors"
1963	Empire	Doctor	Episode: "A House in Order"
1963	Going My Way	Attendant	Episode: "Hear No Evil"
1963–1965	The Virginian	James Francis O'Bannion / George Mitchell	2 episodes
1964	The Richard Boone Show	John Grisham	Episode: "The Arena"
1964	The Outer Limits	Police Lt. Branch	Episode: "Expanding Human"
1964	The Rogues	Cutler	Episode: "Fringe Benefits"
1964	Ben Casey	Dr. Watson	Episode: "A Disease of the Heart Called Love"
1964	Voyage to the Bottom of the Sea	Lawrence Tobin / Presidential Assistant	2 episodes
1964–1966	The Man from U.N.C.L.E.	Phillip Bainbridge / MacInernay	2 episodes
1965	The Fugitive	2 episodes	Season 2 Episode 26- Masquerade (Deputy #1) Season 3 Episode 2- Middle of a heat Wave (Doctor)
1965	Laredo	Mike Pripton	Episode: "I See by Your Outfit"
1965	Convoy	Lt. Wells	Episode: "Lady on the Rock"
1965	Bewitched	Walter Brocken	Episode: "A Strange Little Visitor"
1965–1967	Peyton Place	Thomas	27 episodes
1966	Scalplock	Scrimp	Iron Horse pilot episode released as TV Film
1966	The F.B.I.	Frank Delbey / Claude Bell	2 episodes
1966	A Man Called Shenandoah	Francis Xavier O'Connell	Episode: "Care of General Delivery"
1966	Blue Light	Conners	Episode: "The Friendly Enemy"
1966	Iron Horse	Scrimp	2 episodes
1966	Insight	Rudy Fresno	Episode: "Leroy"
1966	Jericho	Pastor Lutjens	Episode: "Eric the Redhead"
1966–1969	Star Trek	Montgomery Scott	66 episodes
1969	Then Came Bronson	Dr. John Wilson	Episode: "Amid Splinters of the Thunderbolt"
1969–1970	Daniel Boone	Fletcher / Bruce MacFarland	2 episodes
1969–1972	Marcus Welby, M.D.	Fred Baxter / Detective Brenner	2 episodes
1973	Return to Peyton Place	Mr. Blake	2 episodes
1973–1974	Star Trek: The Animated Series	Various	Voice, 22 episodes
1978	Jason of Star Command	Commander Canarvin	16 episodes
1983	Fantasy Island	Governor Gaspar d'Annard	Episode: "Naughty Marietta/The Winning Ticket"
1983	Magnum, P.I.	Archie MacPherson	Episode: "The Big Blow"
1985	Hotel	Roger Deveraux	Episode: "Resolutions"
1987	Série noire	Jim	Episode: "1996"
1988	Danger Bay	Pete	Episode: "Put a Little Back"
1990	MacGyver	Speedy	Episode: "Harry's Will"
1991	Knight Rider 2000	James 'Scotty' Doohan	Television film
1992	Star Trek: The Next Generation	Montgomery Scott	Episode: "Relics"
1996	Homeboys in Outer Space	Pippen	2 episodes
1996	Star Trek: Deep Space Nine	Montgomery Scott	Archive footage in episode: "Trials and Tribble-ations"
1996–1997	The Bold and the Beautiful	Damon Warwick	7 episodes
1997	Duckman	Kardassian	Episode: "Where No Duckman Has Gone Before"
1997	UFOs Above and Beyond	Himself / Host	Television Documentary
2022	Star Trek: Prodigy	Montgomery Scott	Archived audio in episode: "Kobayashi"

=== Video games ===
Year	Title	Role	Notes
1994	Star Trek: 25th Anniversary	Montgomery Scott	Voice, CD-ROM version
1995	Star Trek: Judgment Rites	Lt. Cmdr. Montgomery "Scotty" Scott	Voice, CD-ROM version
1997	Star Trek Generations	Capt. Montgomery "Scotty" Scott	Voice

== Bibliography ==
Autobiography

- Doohan, James; David, Peter (1996). Beam Me Up, Scotty: Star Trek's "Scotty" in his own words. Pocket Books. ISBN 978-0-671-52056-4.

Science fiction novels (The Flight Engineer series)

- Stirling, S. M.; Doohan, James (1996). The Rising. Starline. ISBN 978-0-671-87758-3.
- Stirling, S. M.; Doohan, James (1999). The Privateer. ISBN 978-0-671-57832-9.
- Stirling, S. M.; Doohan, James (2000). The Independent Command. Baen Books. ISBN 978-0-671-31951-9.

== See also ==
- "Beam me up, Scotty", the phrase referring to Doohan's character, Montgomery "Scotty" Scott.
- List of oldest fathers
