= Lister Sinclair =

Canadian actor

Lister Sheddon Sinclair, OC (January 9, 1921 – October 16, 2006) was a Canadian broadcaster, playwright and polymath.

== Early life ==
Sinclair was born in Bombay, India, to Scottish parents. His father, William Sheddon Sinclair, was a chemical engineer. He was sent to live with an aunt in London when he was 18 months old and saw his parents again when he was seven.

He taught himself to read at the age of five and began his formal education at Colet Court. Though at the bottom of his class, he was gifted at mathematics and won a scholarship to St Paul's School in London. In 1939, assured by a travel agency that there would be no war, he visited North America with his mother to attend the World's Fair in New York City. He was visiting Niagara Falls, Ontario, when World War II broke out. Due to a back injury as a teenager, Sinclair walked with a limp and used a cane until well into his twenties and was unfit for military service. He and his mother found themselves stranded on the continent and settled in Vancouver where his mother had friends. He enrolled at the University of British Columbia where he earned a Bachelor of Arts in math and physics and began a lifelong friendship with classmate Pierre Berton. He also joined the Player's Club on campus. In 1942 he moved to Toronto to study toward a Master of Arts from the University of Toronto, supporting himself by lecturing mathematics to undergraduates.

== Career ==
Needing to further supplement his income, Sinclair found employment as an actor with the Canadian Broadcasting Corporation (CBC) playing a German in the 1942 pro-Allied broadcast, Nazi Eyes on Canada, which starred Helen Hayes.

He was subsequently cast in the series Fighting Navy playing the captain of a German U-boat and performed in various other radio plays. He began writing radio plays for the network in 1944 and would go on to write more than 400 plays, many of them for the radio series Stage.

In 1945, Sinclair wrote a radio speech that Co-operative Commonwealth Federation (Ontario Section) leader Ted Jolliffe delivered during the 1945 provincial election campaign. The speech accused Premier of Ontario George Drew of running a political gestapo unit out of the Ontario Provincial Police. The accusations were denied by Drew, and may have hurt the CCF's credibility with voters. However, the charge was proven true in the 1970s by archival documents uncovered by David Lewis's researcher, Alan Whitehorn.

Sinclair's radio play, Hilda Morgan, broadcast on February 12, 1950, resulted in an uproar in the House of Commons of Canada over its then-taboo subject matter of a pregnant, unmarried woman considering abortion after her fiancé is killed in an accident (although the word abortion was never used). He was referred to as "easily the foremost in Canada's array of postwar playwrights" by critic Nathan Cohen. He began to appear on the new CBC Television service in 1955 appearing on programs such as Front Page Challenge and Assignment as well as the Wayne & Shuster comedy show, as well as presenting all but one episode of A Is for Aardvark.

In 1964, Sinclair recorded and released an album on Folkways Records, entitled Documentary History of Broadcasting: 1920-1950: Radio Before Television.

After his appearances in wartime propaganda films, Sinclair would go on to spend over six decades with the CBC in various capacities. In addition to playwright he was a radio and television personality, writer, actor, panelist, producer, lecturer, commentator, and, for a brief period in the 1970s, network executive. Sinclair was a panelist on the show Court of Opinion for twenty-four years, hosted Man at the Centre and was a guest host during the second season of The Nature of Things as well as a frequent contributor to Morningside when Don Harron was host, but he was best known for presenting the CBC Radio program Ideas beginning in 1983. Sinclair retired from hosting Ideas in 1999 after presenting over 2,000 installments, including several hundred produced or written by himself. He continued to contribute to the program until shortly before his death.

In 1972, CBC president Laurent Picard made Sinclair the CBC's executive vice-president of English-language services as part of an effort to bring creative people into administration. The experiment was unsuccessful and proved frustrating to both Sinclair and CBC administration in Ottawa. He was demoted to a more junior position as vice president of program policy and development in 1974 and in 1976 returned to Toronto to his former role as a producer and writer. Dr. Robert Gardner, later the chair of the School of Radio and Television Arts at Ryerson University, recalled working with Sinclair during that difficult time. "He was astoundingly well informed. We worked together on a script for a CBC television program dealing with Dante's Divine Comedy. Lister had hired me as the writer researcher and--there is no doubt about it--he was a demanding boss. His conversations were constantly sprinkled with classical allusions, phrases in German, French, or Italian, and he was impatient of lesser souls. Working with him was one of the most stimulating experiences of my life ... and one of the most frightening."

Sinclair served as president of the Canadian Conference of the Arts from 1980 through 1983. He also helped form the Alliance of Canadian Cinema, Television and Radio Artists (ACTRA). He was named an Officer of the Order of Canada in 1985. The following year he collaborated with his longtime friend and colleague Pierre Berton to create Heritage Theatre, a 26 episode drama series, featuring stories from Berton's popular Canadian history books, and broadcast on CBC TV.

In 2002, Lister Sinclair became a MasterWorks honouree for Hilda Morgan and his body of work by the Audio-Visual Preservation Trust of Canada. One of his last works was something of a hit after his official retirement entitled Lister Sinclair Presents the Masterpieces of Disco Music for the radio program Go.

Sinclair died in a Toronto hospital on the morning of October 16, 2006, aged 85.

Former Governor General and CBC broadcaster Adrienne Clarkson, who shared an office with Sinclair when she joined the broadcaster in the 1960s, remembered him upon his death: "You were the beneficiary of Lister knowing a lot. He was not only a polymath; he was a prodigy."
