= Harry Freeman =

Harry Freeman may refer to:

- Harry Freeman (cricketer) (1860–1933), Australian cricketer
- Harry Freeman (field hockey) (1876–1968), British field hockey player who won a gold medal at the 1908 Summer Olympics
- Harry Lawrence Freeman (1869–1954), American opera composer, conductor, impresario and teacher
- Harry Freeman (footballer) (1918–1997), association footballer who played for Fulham between 1937 and 1952
- Harry Freeman (journalist) (1906–1978), American communist journalist
- Harry Freeman (music hall performer) (1858–1922), music hall performer
- Henry Freeman (lifeboatman) (1835–1904), Whitby fisherman and lifeboatman
- Harry Freeman (triple jumper) (born 1951), American triple jumper, 1972 All-American for the UCLA Bruins track and field team

== See also ==
- Henry Freeman (disambiguation)
- Harold Freeman (disambiguation)
- Harry Freedman (disambiguation)
