= Harry Freedman (disambiguation) =

Harry Freedman (1922–2005) was a Canadian composer, musician and music educator.

Harry Freedman may also refer to:

- Harry Freedman (author) (born 1950), author and entrepreneur
- Harry Freedman (rabbi) (1901–1982), translator of several major Judaic works
- Harry Freedman, character on 55 North Maple

== See also ==
- Harry Friedman (born 1946), American television industry executive
- Harry Freeman (disambiguation)
- Harold Freedman (1915–1999), Australian artist
- Henry Freedman
