= Ambassador Magma =

Japanese manga series

- Cover of the second volume from the Osamu Tezuka Manga Complete Works edition

マグマ大使 (Maguma Taishi)
- Genre: Mecha; Kyodai Hero
- Manga
- Written by: Osamu Tezuka
- Published by: Shōnen Gahosha
- Magazine: Shōnen Gaho
- Original run: May 1965 – August 1967
- Volumes: 3
- Television drama
- Studio: P Productions; Terebi Doga
- Licensed by: US: Krantz Films
- Original network: FNS (Fuji TV)
- Original run: July 4, 1966 – June 26, 1967
- Episodes: 52
- Original video animation
- Directed by: Hidehito Ueda
- Written by: Katsuhiko Koide
- Music by: Toshiyuki Watanabe
- Studio: Bandai Visual; PLEX; Tezuka Productions
- Released: 1993
- Runtime: 25 minutes
- Episodes: 13
- icon

Ambassador Magma (マグマ大使, Maguma Taishi) is the title and protagonist of a manga and tokusatsu TV series created by Osamu Tezuka. The TV series, produced by P Productions, aired on Fuji TV from July 4, 1966, to June 26, 1967, lasting a total of 52 episodes. It is the first color tokusatsu TV series in Japan, beating Tsuburaya Productions' Ultraman to the air by six days. The show later aired in the US, dubbed in English by Krantz Films, as The Space Giants. Digital Manga crowdfunded the manga, and it is currently available for digital purchase on their Emanga site.

== Basic plot ==
The alien invader Goa plots to conquer Earth. He first warns the Murakami family (father Atsushi, mother Tomoko, and son Mamoru) of their invasion, and demonstrates his powers by transporting them to a prehistoric jungle and destroying a Giant Dinosaur (in reality, Agon, the title monster of a Godzilla-like TV series) before their very eyes. But they will not agree to surrender to Goa, so hope comes in the form of Magma, an armored, golden giant with long hair and antennae. He and his human-sized wife Mol, both of whom were created by the wizard of Earth (who indeed lives deep beneath the Earth), are sent to defend our world against Goa. They befriend Atsushi and Mamoru; the latter has touched Magma emotionally, as he wanted to have a child with his wife Mol, so Earth creates a duplicate of Mamoru, whom he names Gam, and who wears a white helmet, with built-in antennae, on his head. Earth gives Mamoru a whistle, with which he can call Gam (when blown once), Mol (when blown twice) and Magma (when blown thrice) in times of crisis. So when Goa unleashes his various daikaiju, chances are that Magma, Mol, and/or Gam will fly to the rescue.

== Ambassador Magma ==
Ambassador Magma, despite his robot-like appearance, is not a true robot, but actually a living giant forged from gold. In fact, true to his original manga appearance, in the series' pilot opening, Tetsuya Uozumi, the actor who played Magma, actually wore gold make-up on his face. But such difficulties as Uozomi's own face turning beet-red, drowning out the gold make-up, quickly arose. The solution proved to be an easy one; in all the show's subsequent episodes, Uozumi wore a golden human-like mask.

Magma, just like his human-sized wife Mol and son Gam, transforms into a giant rocket ship. Indeed, he is considered one of the earliest transforming mecha, even before the anime super robot, Brave Raideen, which set the standard for the genre.

He also shoots rockets out of a panel located in his chest, and (as do Mol and Gam) shoots electrical bolts from his antennae.

== English localization (The Space Giants) ==
The Space Giants is the English title of this series. The show is most notable for its humanoid robot heroes who responded to crises by transforming into rockets to combat a wide variety of dinosaur-like space monsters, and faceless, ninja-like villains called Lugo men (人間モドキ ningen-modoki literally mock-human) whose corpses melted into oozing, blob-like slime whenever they were killed.

The main conflict of the story involved an evil space villain named Rodak who continually tried to conquer Earth by sending a new dinosaur-like monster from deep space to attack Japan. The stories were generally resolved in two to four episodes, much like the BBC's Doctor Who, and a new monster would be found by Rodak to begin another two- to four-part struggle. Rodak's efforts were opposed by an ancient white-bearded wizard named Methusan (sometimes called Methuselah or Mathusem), aided by a trio of humanoid robots who were all capable of transformations from humanoid form into rocket forms.

The human interest in the story was a family of three: a boy named Mikko, his mother Tomoko, and his journalist father Ito Mura. The family became involved in the story due to the villain Rodak's desire to publish news of his presence to world media. The Mura family found themselves continually caught in the crossfire of monster attacks and harried by the Lugo men and Rodak's spies. A major sub-plot in the series developed when Mikko's mother was kidnapped by the Lugo men and held in uncertain conditions for a number of episodes.

In the first episodes, the robot team were a duo consisting of a 50-foot (15 m) gold robot aptly named Goldar and his companion, a silver-clad humanoid female named Silvar. It was implied that they had been created by the wizard Methusan. Early in the series, the wizard Methusan completed the team to mirror the Mura family by creating a humanoid rocket-boy named Gam, in the image of Mikko Mura, complete with his trademark red-and-white sweater vest. All members of the robot team were capable of transforming into rockets identified respectively by gold, silver, and red-and-white color schemes. Each had bulb-tipped antennae protruding from their heads, capable of discharging directed blasts of gamma rays. Goldar and Silvar were capable of firing missiles from their chest cavities, but Silvar was only shown doing this once. A regularly featured plot device was Mikko's ability to summon the robots by blowing a special high-frequency whistle: once to summon Gam, twice to summon Silvar and three times to summon Goldar.

The show first aired in Japan on July 4, 1966, and its international title was Space Avenger (one episode was dubbed for international markets). Originally intending to title it Monsters from Outer Space, the entire series was dubbed into English by Bernard H. Schulman's Lakeside Television Company and syndicated to a limited number of U.S. television stations in early September 1970 (such as WSNS-TV in Chicago and WTAF-TV in Philadelphia), under the title The Space Giants. The show was not distributed widely to U.S. television stations until the late 1970s, when it became a staple of fledgling Superstation TBS afternoon programming. 52 episodes were made, each running 25 minutes. It was known in Spanish as Monstruos del Espacio and in some English-speaking countries as Space Avenger.

As of late January and early February 2017, Bernard Schulman still owned the North American television and home video distribution rights to The Space Giants, under his Lakeside Television banner. At that time, rumors continued to circulate that the series would be issued in Blu-ray and Digital HD format for the 50th Anniversary in 2016, exclusively produced and distributed through AnimeImages and Lakeside Television Company in a joint partnership for production and distribution.

Ambassador Magma makes a cameo appearance in the 2004 Astro Boy: Omega Factor game for the Nintendo Game Boy Advance, along with a number of other characters created by Osamu Tezuka.

=== English version name changes ===
- Magma – Goldar
- Mol – Silvar
- Goa – Rodak
- Atsushi Murakami – Ito "Tom" Mura
- Tomoko Murakami – Tomoko Mura
- Mamoru Murakami – Mikko Mura
- Earth – Methusan
- Atsuya Sekita – Kita
- Modoki Men – Lugo Men

== TV series cast ==
Ambassador Magma (TV series)/ The Space Giants cast
Role	Japanese		English
Role	Live actor	Voice actor	English
Narrator	—		Paul Hecht (first) Ray Owens (second)
Ambassador Magma	Tetsuya Uozumi	Tetsuya Uozumi (pilot) Yoshio Kaneuchi (series)	Goldar
Ambassador Magma	Tetsuya Uozumi	Tetsuya Uozumi (pilot) Yoshio Kaneuchi (series)	Paul Hecht (first) Ray Owens (second)
Goa	Tooru Oohira	Tooru Oohira	Rodak
Goa	Tooru Oohira	Tooru Oohira	Paul Hecht (first) Ray Owens (second)
Mamoru Murakami	Toshio Egi	Toshio Egi	Mikki Mura
Atsushi Murakami	Masumi Okada	Masumi Okada	Itou "Tom" Mura
Atsushi Murakami	Masumi Okada	Masumi Okada	Larry Robinson
Tomoko Murakami	Machiko Yashiro	Machiko Yashiro	Tomoko Mura
Tomoko Murakami	Machiko Yashiro	Machiko Yashiro	Paulette Rubinstein
Gam	—	Hideki Ninomiya (usual voice) Masako Nozawa (episodes 42–43)	
Atsuya Sekita	Ryou Kuroma	Ryou Kuroma	Kita
Atsuya Sekita	Ryou Kuroma	Ryou Kuroma	Peter Fernandez
Earth	Gen Shimizu	Gen Shimizu	Methusan
Earth	Gen Shimizu	Gen Shimizu	Earl Hammond
Mol	Shigeko Mise	Shigeko Mise	Silvar
Mol	Shigeko Mise	Shigeko Mise	Paulette Rubinstein

== 1993 OVA series ==
A 13-episode OVA anime remake was produced in 1993. This series served as a retelling of the original series. The OVA was produced by Bandai Visual, Tezuka Productions and PLEX, and was directed by Hidehito Ueda.

Ambassador Magma (OVA series) cast
Role	Japanese	English
Mamoru Murakami	Masami Kikuchi	Jonathan Fahn
Atsushi Murakami	Jūrōta Kosugi	Sonny Byrkett
Tomoko Murakami	Rika Fukami	Emma Jackson
Fumiaki Asuka	Hidetoshi Nakamura	Steve Blum
Miki Asuka	Miki Itō	Debra Jean Rogers
Magma	Akio Otsuka	Steve Blum
Earth	Kōhei Miyauchi	David Hart
Goa	Tōru Ōhira	Hal Cleaveland
Jagabu	Shigezō Sasaoka	Bill Kestin
Junya Sekita	Wataru Takagi	Gary Dubin
Shūichi Tokuda	Minoru Inaba	

== Adaptations ==
In 1979, American comic book publisher FBN (Fantasy Book Novels) Publications produced a comic book adaptation (written and drawn by Angel Gabriele and artist Richard Lynn) of the first four episodes of Ambassador Magma. In 1994, Gabriele did another Space Giants comic book one-shot published by Boneyard Press.

== See also ==
- List of Osamu Tezuka anime
- List of Osamu Tezuka manga
- Osamu Tezuka
- Osamu Tezuka's Star System
