= Knowlton Nash =

Canadian journalist, author, news anchor (1927–2014)

Knowlton Nash OC OOnt
- Born: Cyril Knowlton Nash; November 18, 1927; Toronto, Ontario, Canada
- Died: May 24, 2014 (aged 86); Toronto, Ontario, Canada
- Occupations: Author, journalist, news anchor
- Spouses: Kathleen Barron (m. 1949; div. 1951); Alicia Banos (m. 1955; div. 1964); Sylvia DeCunha (m. 1965; div. 1972); Lorraine Thomson (m. 1982)

Cyril Knowlton Nash OC OOnt (November 18, 1927 – May 24, 2014) was a Canadian journalist, author and news anchor. He was senior anchor of CBC Television's flagship news program, The National from 1978 until his retirement in 1992. He began his career in journalism by selling newspapers on the streets of Toronto during World War II. Before age 20, he was a professional journalist for British United Press (BUP). After some time as a freelance foreign correspondent, he became the CBC's Washington correspondent during the Kennedy and Johnson administrations, also covering stories in South and Central America and Vietnam. He moved back to Toronto in 1968 to join management as head of CBC's news and information programming, then stepped back in front of the camera in 1978 as anchor of CBC's late evening news program, The National. He stepped down from that position in 1988 to make way for Peter Mansbridge. Nash wrote several books about Canadian journalism and television, including his own memoirs as a foreign correspondent.

== Early life ==
Nash was born in Toronto, Ontario, Canada, on November 18, 1927, and named "Cyril" after his father, a racetrack betting manager. The young boy disliked being called "Cyril Junior" and, at age five, asked his parents to instead call him by his middle name, Knowlton. From an early age, Nash was fascinated with the world of journalism: by age 8, he was writing his own news sheet and selling advertising space to local merchants in exchange for candy. By age nine he was writing letters to the editors of Toronto newspapers, and by age 10 he was operating a newsstand. In 1940, at age 12, Nash was a newspaper boy on the streets of Toronto selling the Toronto Star and Toronto Telegram for three cents a copy. Seeing Joel McCrea play a trench-coated reporter in Alfred Hitchcock's wartime thriller Foreign Correspondent further fuelled his personal ambition to become a journalist.

== Career ==
=== Print journalism ===
In his early teens, Nash reported on weekly high school sports for The Globe and Mail. In 1944, he dropped out of high school to become editor of Canadian High News, a small weekly tabloid distributed to most high schools in southern Ontario. His fellow staff members included Keith Davey and Robert McMichael.

The following year, he spent some time editing a couple of crime magazines, then reported for a Toronto neighbourhood newspaper for a few months. Nash and some former staff members from Canadian High News then bought up two neighbourhood newspapers, but with little advertising revenue, both papers quickly ran out of money and went out of business. Nash briefly tried his hand at writing for pulp magazines True Confessions and True Crime.

=== Wire service reporter ===
Nash briefly attended the University of Toronto but in 1947, at age 19, he was hired as night editor in the Toronto office of BUP, a wire news service affiliated with United Press. This position mainly involved "scalping" news stories from the Toronto newspapers—rewriting stories covered by the newspapers, then filing them by teletype. After a few months, Nash also started to write original feature articles, and was also sent to cover the Ontario provincial legislature as well as professional sports events in Toronto. The following year, Nash was assigned to BUP's Halifax office as bureau manager, responsible for news coverage in The Maritimes and Newfoundland. In 1949, he was promoted to manager of BUP's Vancouver office, where he covered the protests by the "Sons of Freedom" sect of Doukhobors, and interviewed various celebrities, including Bing Crosby and Rudy Vallée.

In 1951, at age 23, Nash returned to BUP's Toronto office, this time as bureau manager. Among other stories, he covered the death of William "Red" Hill Jr., who died trying to emulate his daredevil father by going over Niagara Falls in a floating contraption; and the 1951 Canadian royal tour of Princess Elizabeth and Prince Philip.

=== IFAP editor and researcher ===
In 1951, Nash was hired by the Washington, D.C.–based International Federation of Agricultural Producers (IFAP) to gather information and edit their monthly newsletter. His office was right across the street from the White House—he would often see President Harry S Truman walking by with his Secret Service detail on noon-hour walks. Research for his work brought him in touch with many officials, and he quickly developed a network of contacts within Washington power circles.

His work with IFAP made Nash a world traveller, with a dozen trips to Europe by steamship, plus visits to Mexico and Central America as well as Africa. It also brought him in contact with many notables, including Pope Pius XII, Dag Hammarskjöld, Lord Boyd Orr, Dwight D. Eisenhower and future Dutch prime minister Barend Biesheuvel.

It was on a trip to Kenya during the Mau Mau Uprising in 1954 that Nash also became a freelance foreign correspondent, sending several radio reports on the unrest to the Canadian Broadcasting Corporation (CBC) and the British Broadcasting Corporation (BBC) while he attended an IFAP conference in Nairobi. He continued to file freelance stories for the CBC and the Financial Post while travelling abroad, and became a stringer for the Windsor Star. He also occasionally wrote for the Family Herald, Maclean's, Chatelaine and the Star Weekly.

=== Freelance journalist ===
Having developed a strong network of contacts in the Washington area, Nash left IFAP to become a freelance journalist in 1958. Politics had always been a passion, and in order to write and file stories for many media outlets, he now had the opportunity to meet many American politicians, including Joseph McCarthy, Richard Nixon, Adlai Stevenson, Lyndon B. Johnson, and the up-and-coming John F. Kennedy and his brothers Robert and Ted Kennedy. His first major political event was the 1960 Democratic National Convention, where he was an eyewitness to many of the backroom and convention floor deals that resulted in the nomination of John F. Kennedy.

Nash's first television news assignment was covering the funeral of John Foster Dulles for the CBC on May 27, 1959. Nash initially was not that interested in doing television reports, which only earned him the same fee as radio reports but took much longer to prepare; but he soon realized that the future of news reportage lay in television, and from that point on he did all he could to learn about the new medium.

In addition to covering political news in Washington, Nash also travelled around the United States and internationally. His many assignments included

- the race riots in Oxford, Mississippi that resulted when federal soldiers were deployed to allow James Meredith to become the first Black student to be admitted to the University of Mississippi.
- the launch of the Project Mercury rocket Friendship 7 from Cape Canaveral, making John Glenn the first American to orbit the Earth.
- the Cuban Missile Crisis. (Nash waited in the White House for news during the perceived height of the crisis on the evening of Saturday, October 27, 1962, despite the apparent risk of a Russian atomic attack on the American capital.)
- a three-week trip to Cuba to see the effect of Fidel Castro's takeover and the subsequent American trade embargo. While there, he found Che Guevara helping to harvest sugar cane and interviewed him about the Cuban revolution.
- the civil rights March on Washington for Jobs and Freedom on August 28, 1963, where Martin Luther King Jr. delivered his "I Have a Dream" speech.
- the aftermath in Washington of the assassination of John F. Kennedy
- the trial of Jack Ruby in February 1964
- the 1964 Republican National Convention that chose Barry Goldwater, and the 1964 Democratic National Convention that chose Lyndon B. Johnson.
- the Selma to Montgomery marches in May 1965
- the many riots during the summer of 1967, including Newark and Detroit.
- Robert Kennedy's final lengthy interview just before he was assassinated in 1968.
- the violent 1968 Democratic National Convention in Chicago. At one point, Nash was caught up in the street rioting and received a minor head injury.

Nash also travelled back to Canada to cover Canadian political events for CBC, including television coverage of election night for the federal elections of 1962, 1963 and 1965; the 1965 Saskatchewan doctors' strike; and the Gerda Munsinger sex scandal of 1966.

Freelance correspondents were not well paid by CBC, and in 1965, Nash helped to form the CBC Foreign Correspondents Association in order to negotiate a better wage for members, and became its first vice-president.

Nash also made extended trips abroad, including a half-dozen visits to Central and South America, and two trips to Southeast Asia to provide a Canadian perspective to the Vietnam War.

He also interviewed many prominent newsmakers of the time, including Pierre Salinger, George Lincoln Rockwell, Allen Dulles, Dick Gregory, Ronald Reagan, Colombian president Guillermo León Valencia, Venezuelan president Romulo Betancourt and Dean Rusk.

=== CBC management ===
Nash stepped down from reporting in 1969 to join CBC's management in Toronto as Director of News and Current Affairs. Foreseeing the need to adopt new technologies to traditional journalism, he quickly upgraded the CBC's late evening news program, The National, from black & white to colour, and established an "electronic information highway" by dedicated phone line so that the Toronto office could quickly receive stories from distant parts of Canada. (At the time, CBC air-freighted film and videotape of news stories from other parts of the country to The National's Toronto offices.) Nash also hired a new generation of producers and managers, including Peter Herrndorf as head of TV Current Affairs.

On October 15, 1970, during the October Crisis, Secretary of State Gérard Pelletier convinced CBC President George Davidson that the situation in Quebec threatened to grow into a widespread insurrection that would threaten the Canadian state, and that CBC reporting should not "inflame" the situation. Davidson asked Nash to ensure that CBC News would not indulge in "speculative discussions" about the crisis — in effect, self-censoring any political commentary. Nash immediately sent out a Telex to CBC staff to that effect. Two hours later, after some introspection, Nash realized that he was agreeing to government interference in the CBC's reportage, and modified his Telex to instead call for "responsible journalistic professionalism". Nash was candidly self-critical about his role in allowing the two hours of self-censorship, and later wrote, "I certainly was not skeptical enough about what Pelletier had said to Davidson and let my nationalism override my journalistic values. There are times when that is necessary, but this wasn't one of them and I was wrong."

Nash believed in the power of television to educate Canadians about their own history, and was instrumental in getting several series of "docudramas" on air despite protests from the entertainment and drama department that he was treading on their turf. These included the critically acclaimed The National Dream in 1974, about the politics behind the building of the transcontinental railway; The Tenth Decade, about the political rivalry between John Diefenbaker and Lester B. Pearson from 1957 to 1967; The Days Before Yesterday, about the ascendancy of the federal Liberal party in 1905 under Wilfrid Laurier to its almost complete collapse in 1957; individual series on both John Diefenbaker and Lester B. Pearson; Images of Canada, a look at the social history of Canada; The Age of Uncertainty with Canadian-born economist John Kenneth Galbraith; and a co-production with ITV about the Second World War.

Although most of these series garnered critical acclaim and good ratings, not everything was a success. In 1976, Nash and Peter Hernndorf launched a late-night current affairs talk show, Ninety Minutes Live with host Peter Gzowski, who, although good as a radio interviewer, was awkward on television. In an effort to prop up falling ratings, the initial "current affairs" focus of the show drifted towards entertainment, but audiences did not respond and the program was pulled after two seasons.

=== Chief correspondent ===
Following the departure of Peter Kent as anchor of The National in 1978, Nash was approached by the executive producer of the program, Trina McQueen, about becoming the anchor. Nash agreed to audition for the role, and was subsequently chosen. As a nod to his journalistic background as opposed to being simply a news reader, Nash was given the title "Chief Correspondent" rather than "News Anchor". On his first night on air, November 20, 1978, his lead story was the Jonestown Massacre.

During his tenure as anchor, Nash covered the 1979 Canadian federal election, the sudden fall of the Joe Clark minority government and the re-election to power of Pierre Trudeau, the 1980 Quebec referendum on sovereignty, the 1980 Republican National Convention in Detroit that nominated Ronald Reagan and the subsequent election of Reagan to the U.S. presidency, the 1981 wedding of Prince Charles, Prince of Wales, to Lady Diana Spencer, the 1983 Conservative leadership review that saw Joe Clark replaced by Brian Mulroney, the February 1984 resignation of Pierre Trudeau after his "walk in the snow", and the 1984 Canadian federal election that saw John Turner fall to Brian Mulroney.

Nash was also in front of the camera on January 11, 1982, when The National was controversially moved from its customary timeslot of 11 p.m. to 10 p.m., lengthened from 15 to 20 minutes, and joined to a new 40-minute current affairs program, The Journal, with hosts Barbara Frum and Mary Lou Finlay.

=== Author ===
In 1984, Nash wrote the first volume of his memoirs as a foreign correspondent, History on the Run. John Mitchell called it "fascinating reading for anyone interested in a first-hand account of the political and social events of the 1950s and 1960s", and wrote of Nash's style, "His prose is crisp and precise. Yet the descriptive passages, in particular the John F. Kennedy funeral procession, evoke old memories and emotions in vivid detail." Nash subsequently wrote eight more books about his career, journalism, politics and Canadian broadcasting including Microphone Wars: A History of Triumph and Betrayal at the CBC, which traced the history of public broadcasting in Canada from its beginnings in the 1930s to the mid-1990s, chronicling the inside struggles at the CBC as programmers fought against the frequent short-sightedness of corporate executives while both sides coped with the hostility of federal politicians who refused to provide adequate, long-term funding. Harry J. Boyle, a veteran CBC insider and one-time chair of the Canadian Radio-television and Telecommunications Commission (CRTC), summed the book up this way: "While it exposes corporate stupidities, political meddling and boozing executives, it vigorously endorses public broadcasting."

Nash's books continued to garner favourable reviews, with critics often mentioning his in-depth research and personal knowledge of events and notable people. Geoffrey Stevens wrote of Kennedy And Diefenbaker: Fear And Loathing Across The Undefended Border: "It is well researched, with a clear, tight focus. It takes the reader inside the councils of state to show how personal relations—especially hatred—at the highest levels can influence dealings between nations."

=== Retirement ===
In 1988, Nash offered to retire from his duties at The National in order to keep Peter Mansbridge from moving to the morning news at American network CBS. When Mansbridge accepted Nash's offer and stayed at CBC, Nash stepped down as chief correspondent, although he continued to anchor The National on Saturday evenings and filled in as weekday anchor when Mansbridge was on assignment or on vacation. Nash fully retired from CBC News after anchoring The National on November 28, 1992.

After retirement from news-reading and reporting, Nash continued to host various programs on CBC Newsworld for several years. From 1990 to 2004, he was also host of the CBC's educational series News in Review.

== Personal life ==
Nash was married four times, although his final marriage, to CBC personality Lorraine Thomson, lasted for 32 years. Nash blamed the dissolution of previous marriages on his peripatetic life as a journalist and his over-dedication to his work.

Nash was diagnosed with Parkinson's disease in 2002 but remained sanguine about the diagnosis, saying that many other people faced much greater challenges. "I can argue that I can get a couple of extra strokes in my golf game", he told the Toronto Star in 2006. He died on May 24, 2014, in Toronto.

== Honours ==
- Officer of the Order of Canada (1989)
- Member of the Order of Ontario (1998)
- Queen Elizabeth II Golden Jubilee Medal (2002)
- Queen Elizabeth II Diamond Jubilee Medal (2012)
- President's Award of the Radio-Television News Directors Association (1990)
- John Drainie Award "for distinguished contributions to broadcasting" (1995)
- Inducted into the Canadian News Hall of Fame (1996)
- Honorary Juris Doctor degrees from the University of Toronto (1993), Brock University (1995), the University of Regina, (1996), Loyalist College (1997) and York University (2005).
- Max Bell Professor at the University of Regina School of Journalism in 1992
- Lifetime achievement award from the Canadian Journalism Foundation (2006)
- Mentioned in Stan Rogers' 1981 song Working Joe ("Running from the crack of dawn 'til Knowlton reads the news...")

== Bibliography ==
- History on the Run: The Trenchcoat Memoirs of a Foreign Correspondent. McClelland and Stewart. 1984. ISBN 0-7710-6700-3.
- Times to Remember: A Canadian Photo Album. Key Porter Books. 1986. ISBN 1-55013-005-6.
- Prime Time at Ten: Behind-the-Camera Battles of Canadian TV Journalism (McClelland and Stewart, 1987), ISBN 0-7710-6703-8
- Kennedy and Diefenbaker: Fear and Loathing across the Undefended Border (McClelland and Stewart, 1990), ISBN 0-7710-6705-4
- Visions of Canada: Searching for Our Future (McClelland and Stewart, 1991), ISBN 0-7710-6708-9
- The Microphone Wars: A History of Triumph and Betrayal at the CBC (McClelland and Stewart, 1994), ISBN 0-7710-6712-7
- Cue the Elephant!: Backstage Tales at the CBC (McClelland and Stewart, 1996), ISBN 0-7710-6734-8
- Trivia Pursuit: How Showbiz Values are Corrupting the News (McClelland and Stewart, 1998), ISBN 0-7710-6752-6
- Swashbucklers: The Story of Canada's Battling Broadcasters (McClelland and Stewart, 2001), ISBN 0-7710-6774-7

== Notes ==
Media offices
| New title | Chief Correspondent for CBC News; 1978–1988 | Succeeded by Peter Mansbridge |
| Preceded by Peter Kent | Anchor of The National; 1978–1988 | Succeeded by Peter Mansbridge |
