= Robert L. Lawrence =

American film producer

- Born: December 8, 1919; Stamford, Connecticut
- Died: September 23, 2004 (aged 84); New York, New York
- Occupation: Producer
- Spouse: Marjorie Bernstein Lawrence
- Children: Peter D. Lawrence and Steven T. Lawrence

Robert Leonard Lawrence (December 8, 1919 – September 23, 2004) was an American television and film producer, and co-founder of Grantray-Lawrence Animation, which is best known for producing the first Spider-Man cartoon series in 1967.

== Career ==
Lawrence graduated from West Point in 1943, and served as a First Lieutenant and then Captain in the United States Fifth Army in World War II. Following the Liberation of Italy, he co-founded Foreign Film Productions with fellow soldier Rod E. Geiger. Together, they secured distribution rights in the United States for Roberto Rossellini's film Rome, Open City and co-produced one of his next films, Paisan.

After splitting with Geiger in 1946 and resigning his commission in 1947, Lawrence took jobs with RKO Pictures and NBC News and served as vice-president in charge of Eastern operations for Jerry Fairbanks Productions. In 1952, he founded Robert Lawrence Productions, which produced live-action and animated TV commercials, employing the talents of animators who had previously worked for United Productions of America, such as Tissa David, Gene Deitch, and Grim Natwick.

Throughout the 1960s and 70s, Robert Lawrence Productions co-produced several of Jim Henson's television specials, which were filmed at Lawrence's studio in Toronto, including Hey, Cinderella!, The Frog Prince, The Muppet Musicians of Bremen, and Emmet Otter’s Jug-Band Christmas. The Toronto branch also produced several Canadian TV series (including Moment of Truth and 55 North Maple), the filming of the 1964 American premiere of Karlheinz Stockhausen's Momente, and the 1971 Disney film King of the Grizzlies.

In 1954, Lawrence co-founded Grantray-Lawrence Animation with animators Grant Simmons and Ray Patterson (whose first names added up to "Grantray"). In 1965, Lawrence decided to bring the Marvel Comics characters to TV through an animated series to be produced by Grantray-Lawrence. The Marvel Super Heroes premiered in 1966 and Spider-Man in 1967. These were the first appearances of Marvel superheroes in electronic media. Grantray-Lawrence also did sub-contracted work on Top Cat, The Jetsons, The Dick Tracy Show, and The Famous Adventures of Mr. Magoo. The company went bankrupt in 1968 after a protracted legal battle with their distributor, Krantz Films.

In 1963, Lawrence and Donald Rugoff co-founded Cinema V (which acquired foreign films for distribution within the US), with Lawrence serving as president. Lawrence's other activities at this time include producing the 1965 comedy Harvey Middleman, Fireman.

In 1971, Lawrence helped his wife Marjorie open The Pillowry, the first store to make handmade pillows from Oriental rug fragments. He dedicated much of his later life to service to West Point (where he co-founded the Jewish Chapel), the West Point Society of New York (of which he briefly served as president), and the Directors Guild of America. During this time, he also executive produced the 1983 television film When Angels Fly.

== Personal life ==
From 1946 until his death, Lawrence was married to Marjorie Bernstein Lawrence. They had two sons, Peter (b. 1948) and Steven (b. 1953).
