= Grantray-Lawrence Animation =

American animation studio

- Industry: Animation
- Founded: 1954; 72 years ago
- Founders: Grant Simmons; Ray Patterson; Robert L. Lawrence
- Defunct: 1968; 58 years ago
- Fate: Bankruptcy; assets taken over by Krantz Films
- Products: Animated television series

Grantray-Lawrence Animation was an American animation studio active from 1954 to 1968 and founded by Grant Simmons, Ray Patterson (hence "Grant-Ray"), and Robert L. Lawrence.

This animation company produced commercials and low-budget animated television shows until it went bankrupt in 1968 after the death of Grant Simmons. and its distributor, Krantz Films, took over production. The best-known of those animated shows are its adaptations of superheroes from Marvel Comics, the earliest such adaptations for electronic media. Before then, it did sub-contracted work on Top Cat, The Jetsons, The Dick Tracy Show, and The Famous Adventures of Mr. Magoo.

== Filmography ==
Grantray-Lawrence filmography
Year	Title	Co-production with	Notes
1957	The Hope that Jack Built		
1958	Planet Patrol		Failed pilot
1966	The Marvel Super Heroes	Marvel Comics Group	Aired in syndication
1966–69	Rocket Robin Hood	Trillium Productions; Krantz Films	Uncredited
1967–70	Spider-Man	Marvel Comics Group	Season 1; continued by Krantz Films
1967	Max, the 2000-Year-Old Mouse	Al Guest Studios; Krantz Films	
