= The Weaker Sex =

The Weaker Sex may refer to:

- The Weaker Sex (play), a 1929 play by the French writer Édouard Bourdet
- The Weaker Sex (1917 film), a 1917 American film directed by Raymond B. West
- The Weaker Sex (1933 film), a French film adaptation of the 1929 play
- The Weaker Sex (1948 film), a British film directed by Roy Ward Baker
- The Weaker(?) Sex, a Canadian television talk show
- "The Weaker Sex" (Sliders), an episode of the TV show Sliders
