= Henry Freeman =

Henry Freeman may refer to:

- Henry Freeman (lifeboatman) (1835–1904), Whitby fisherman and lifeboatman
- Henry Blanchard Freeman (1837–1915), U.S. Army general, Medal of Honor recipient during the American Civil War
- Henry Stanhope Freeman (died 1865), governor of the Lagos Colony
- Martin Henry Freeman (1826–1889), first black president of an American college

== See also ==
- Harry Freeman (disambiguation)
- Henry Freedman
