= Angel Gabriele =

American comic book artist and professional wrestling manager (1956 – 2016)

- Born: Pasquale Demetrio Angelo Gabriele; March 21, 1956 Brooklyn, New York
- Died: February 23, 2016 (aged 59) Fort Wayne, Indiana
- Areas: Penciller, Inker, Publisher, Professional wrestling manager
- Pseudonyms: Pat Gabriele, Pasquale D. Gabriel, Dark Angel
- Notable works: Space Giants

Angel Gabriele (March 21, 1956 – February 23, 2016) was an American comic book artist and publisher, best known for the comic book adaptation of the Space Giants. He was also a professional wrestling manager and promoter, renowned for his role as the Dark Angel. In his publications, he has sometimes been credited as Pat Gabriele and Pasquale D. Gabriel.

== Biography ==
=== Comics ===
Gabriele was born in Brooklyn, New York and began his venture in comic books at the age of 16 by holding the 1972 convention FanCon '72 in Norfolk, Virginia, hosting such guests as Kelly Freas, Wally Wood, Murray Leinster, and Mike Kaluta. Gabriele learned the basics of the art trade in the early 1970s from Freas in his Virginia Beach studio.

In 1974 Gabriele's professional comic book art career started when he left his parents' home in Tidewater, Virginia, and sojourned to New York City, assisting Rich Buckler at Marvel Comics on uncredited work involving the Fantastic Four, Deathlok, and other assignments. By 1975 Gabriele had graduated to producing covers and splash pages for Marvel's British department while still working with Buckler. Gabriele's first credited work was DC Comics' Kobra #4 in 1976, a comic which was already four weeks late when it was assigned to him for "layouts & pacing." In 1977 Gabriele became acquainted with lifelong friend and fellow artist Denys Cowan.

In 1978, having relocated to Wabash, Indiana (and after a stint as a T-shirt artist) Gabriele acquired merchandising rights to the Space Giants, a U.S. adaptation of Osamu Tezuka's Japanese comic, Magma Taishi ("Ambassador Magma"). In 1979 Gabriele's company, FBN (Fantasy Book Novels) Publications, published a comic book adaptation of the first four episodes of Space Giants.

In 1981, after a stint with Merrillville, Indiana-based fledgling multicultural comic book company Leader Comics, Gabriele returned to New York City. There he worked again for a very short period with Rich Buckler, and met Mark Texeira, with whom he later shared a studio and produced the T.H.U.N.D.E.R. Agents revival for JC Productions. Eventually, Gabriele, Denys Cowan, and fellow artist Trevor Von Eeden shared an apartment in New York's Chelsea Hotel. There Gabriele designed the original "Beast Machine" characters for Strongen-Mayhiem's Power Lords (the action figures would be released by Revell).

=== Dark Angel and professional wrestling ===
It was during this period in the mid-1980s after the birth of his daughter that Gabriele's stylized alter-ego the Dark Angel was born. By 1986, Gabriele had again left New York City and returned to the midwest, where he introduced the Dark Angel, in the first three issues of the independent comic book series Dark Adventures (published by Darkline).

Concurrently, Gabriele stepped into the role of the Dark Angel and became part of Dick the Bruiser's WWA, working live events and television episodes with wrestling legends like Don Kent, Yukon Moose Cholak, Bobo Brazil, Scott Steiner, Terry Sullivan, as well as Dick the Bruiser himself. After a 1988 disagreement with Dick the Bruiser, Grabiele began operating his own wrestling promotion and television show, Powerslam Professional Wrestling, featuring established wrestlers such as Ox Baker and Calypso Jim (now Bobo Brazil, Jr.), Ed Farhat (a.k.a. the Original Sheik), as well as booking early matches with new talent such as Sabu and Rob Van Dam. Powerslam Professional Wrestling lasted until 1991.

=== Return to comics ===
During the 1990s, Gabriele (along with his protégé Jeff Newman) collaborated with Denys Cowan in Milestone Comics "universe," as well as inking titles such as Static and Hardware. Gabriele also drew several covers for DC, including a three-cover run for one of DC's Impact titles, The Web. He also produced several books for Boneyard Press, including an adaptation of the stories of Ed Gein, Billy The Kid, and another issue of the Space Giants, which printed a Mark Texeira story originally drawn in 1981.

In 1996, Gabriele was approached by the California firm LK Management to publish a line of comics, with Gabriele as its executive editor. A deal was struck and, utilizing the talents of Willie Peppers, Greg Theakston, Jeff Newman, and Byron Black, Gabriele set up the Hyper X Studio (a division of his Hyper Graphics Studio) in North Manchester, Indiana. From this arrangement the Pyramid Comics line was born. Several full comics were prepared and solicited before the LK Management vanished with investors' funds. Gabriele attempted to save the fledgling company, but by the end of 1997 Pyramid had ceased, leaving him with twenty-three unpublished titles.

=== Return to wrestling and later career ===
In 1998, Gabriele was enticed back into professional wrestling, reprising his 1980s television show Powerslam as Powerslam2000, and recruiting Big Bang Comics co-creator Chris Ecker as an announcer. Gabriele held a live event at the 1999 Novi, Michigan, Pop Culture Convention with The Iron Sheik in the main event. In 2000, Gabriele again withdrew from active involvement in the world of professional wrestling and only made a few more rare appearances at live matches.

In the 2000s Gabriele has been accepting commissioned work and maintained a website promoting Powerslam Wrestling and unlicensed Space Giants memorabilia, notably a complete series DVD set made combining audio of the dub from US television airings and Japanese VHS tapes, which would often revert to Japanese during undubbed/missing scenes, with some episodes being only in Japanese. Gabriele claimed that during the 1979 deal, he was granted all rights to the series sans television airings Lakeshore Television Productions, the owners of Space Giants in the US. A court battle between and Powerslam determined Lakeshore were the sole owners of the properties, pulling his unauthorized items from eBay and other online retailers. Despite this, copies of the show sourced from the complete series set still continue to circulate.

He collaborated with his friend Richard "Grass" Green, producing Green's 2002 Xal-Kor comic book, released by TwoMorrows Publishing, only months before Green's untimely passing due to lung cancer. Gabriele also contributed an article on hidden messages in Bill Everett's inking of Jack Kirby's art for Thor (Marvel Comics) in The Jack Kirby Collector #49.

== Selected bibliography ==
- Kobra #4 (DC, 1976)
- Space Giants NN# (FBN, 1979)
- JCP Features: T.H.U.N.D.E.R. Agents #1 (JC Publications, 1981)
- Dark Adventures #1-4 (Darkline, 1986)
- Alphawave #1 (Darkline, 1986)
- Darkside #1 (Darkline, 1986)
- Calypso Jim Souvenir Album (Wehner, 1986)
- Elfinwild #1 (Wehner, 1987)
- Astonish #1 (Wehner, 1988)
- RIP #5 (TSR, 1991)
- Frank (Frankenstein) #3 & #4 (Nemesis/Harvey, 1992)
- The Web #6, 7, 8 (DC/Impact, 1992)
- Ox Baker Souvenir Coloring Book (Hypergraphics, 1993)
- KlownShock #1 (Northstar, 1993)
- True Gein: The Story Of Ed (Boneyard, 1993)
- The Space Giants (Boneyard, 1994)
- Billy The Kid (Boneyard, 1994)
- Static #17 (DC/Milestone, 1994)
- The Long Hot Summer #3 (DC/Milestone, 1995)
- Hardware #34, 35, 36 (DC/Milestone, 1995)
- Xal-Kor, The Human Cat (TwoMorrows, 2002)
