= V.I.P. (talk show) =

- Also known as: Very Interesting People
- Genre: talk show
- Presented by: Lorraine Thomson
- Country of origin: Canada
- Original language: English

Original release
- Network: CBC Television
- Release: 28 March 1973 – 8 April 1983

V.I.P. (Very Interesting People) is a Canadian talk show that aired from 1973 to 1983, generally during the Canadian summer months. Lorraine Thomson was host/interviewer.

Guests included:

- Group of Seven artist A. J. Casson
- actress Nanette Fabray
- actor John Forsythe
- musician André Gagnon
- actor Lorne Greene
- British Prime Minister Edward Heath
- astronaut James Irwin
- actor George "Spanky" McFarland of Our Gang
- British actress Anna Russell
- hockey player Darryl Sittler

Episodes from this series were rebroadcast on Canadian cable network Bravo from 1998 to 2002.
