= Thornhill (federal electoral district) =

Federal electoral district in Ontario, Canada

Coordinates: 43.8112°N 79.4236°W

Ontario electoral district
- Interactive map of riding boundaries from the 2025 federal election

Federal electoral district
- Legislature: House of Commons
MP
Melissa Lantsman
Conservative
- District created: 1996
- First contested: 1997
- Last contested: 2025
- District webpage: profile, map

Demographics
- Population (2021): 115,292
- Electors (2021): 85,739
- Area (km²): 62.90
- Pop. density (per km²): 1,832.9
- Census division: York
- Census subdivision(s): Markham (part), Vaughan (part)

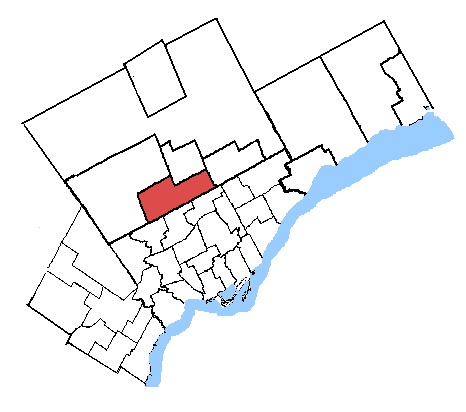
Thornhill 2003 to 2015

Thornhill is a federal electoral district in Ontario, Canada, that has been represented in the House of Commons of Canada since 1997. It covers its namesake Thornhill neighbourhood, which is split between the Cities of Vaughan and Markham. The Vaughan portion also includes parts of the city east of Highway 400 and south of Rutherford Road, including the largely industrial district of Concord and Vaughan's planned downtown; Vaughan Metropolitan Centre. The part in the City of Markham is restricted its portion of Thornhill itself (but does not include it all) west of Bayview Avenue. The riding was created in 1996 and the east end of the riding was split off into other ridings in 2012.

The riding has the largest Jewish population in Canada at 29.5 percent.

The riding was initially safe for the Liberals, and they won large majorities of the vote in its first two elections. In 2004, the large Jewish population started shifting toward the Conservative Party, and the Conservatives won the riding in 2008. After being targeted by the Conservatives as part of their strategy to win a majority in 2011, the riding became a Conservative stronghold and the strongest Conservative seat in the Greater Toronto Area.

== Riding profile ==
The riding is named after Thornhill, a suburban neighbourhood founded as a rural community that was first settled along Yonge Street in the mid-1790s, around the time of the street's opening. The district of Concord and Vaughan Metropolitan Centre occupies the northern and western parts of the riding.

According to the 2016 census, the population of the riding was 112,719, up 2.1% from 2011. In 2015, the median income in the riding was $33,474 compared to $30,798 in 2010. The average income in the riding was $54,590 compared to $47,097 in 2010. The most spoken non-official language in the riding is Russian (14.5%) and 16.4% of the population is of Russian ethnic origin. The second largest ethnic origin is Chinese with 11.2% in 2016. About 37% of the riding's population is part of a visible minority. The riding also has a large Jewish population (37.1% in 2011) and has been cited as showing voting trends among Jewish populations. The riding has a higher rate of postsecondary certificates, diplomas, and degrees than the Ontario average (66% compared to 55% for those aged 15+). The riding has been described as a Conservative stronghold.

== Demographics ==
Population, 2021 census	115,292
Electors	85,739
Area (km^{2})	62.66
Population density (people per km^{2})	1,839.8

Religion in Thornhill (2021)
1. Christian (33.5%)
2. Jewish (30.5%)
3. No Religion (23.3%)
4. Muslim (6.60%)
5. Hindu (3.20%)
6. Buddhist (1.80%)
7. Other religions (1.20%)

According to the 2021 Canadian census

Ethnic groups: 57% White, 11.3% Chinese, 7% West Asian, 6.3% South Asian, 5.1% Korean, 4.8% Filipino, 2.6% Black, 1.5% Latin American, 1.1% Southeast Asian

== History ==
=== 1996-2004: Liberal dominance ===
The riding was first established in the 1996 redistribution from parts of York North and Markham—Whitchurch—Stouffville, consisting of the part of Vaughan east of Highway 400 and south of Rutherford Road, and the part of Markham west of Highway 404. Both of the ridings Thornhill was originally part of elected Liberal MPs in 1993, though York North's Liberal vote share was about 17% more of the vote than that of Markham—Whitchurch—Stouffville. The riding's redistributed result had the Liberals at 60%, triple the amount of the Progressive Conservatives (PCs). In the 1997 election, Liberal candidate Elinor Caplan, who had previously served in the cabinet of former Premier David Peterson, won with 59% of the vote, more than double the number received by PC candidate Bill Fisch, who came second. Similarly to the previous election, the Liberals had nearly swept the province of Ontario, this time winning all but two seats.

In 1999, Caplan was appointed to Prime Minister Jean Chrétien's cabinet as Minister of Citizenship and Immigration. In the 2000 election, Caplan would win again, this time with nearly 65% of the vote and by more than four times the amount won by Canadian Alliance candidate Robert Goldin. Provincially, the Liberals had won another near-sweep of Ontario. In 2002, Chrétien moved Caplan to Minister of National Revenue. During the 2003 electoral redistribution, the boundaries of the district did not change.

=== 2004-2011: Shift to the Conservatives ===
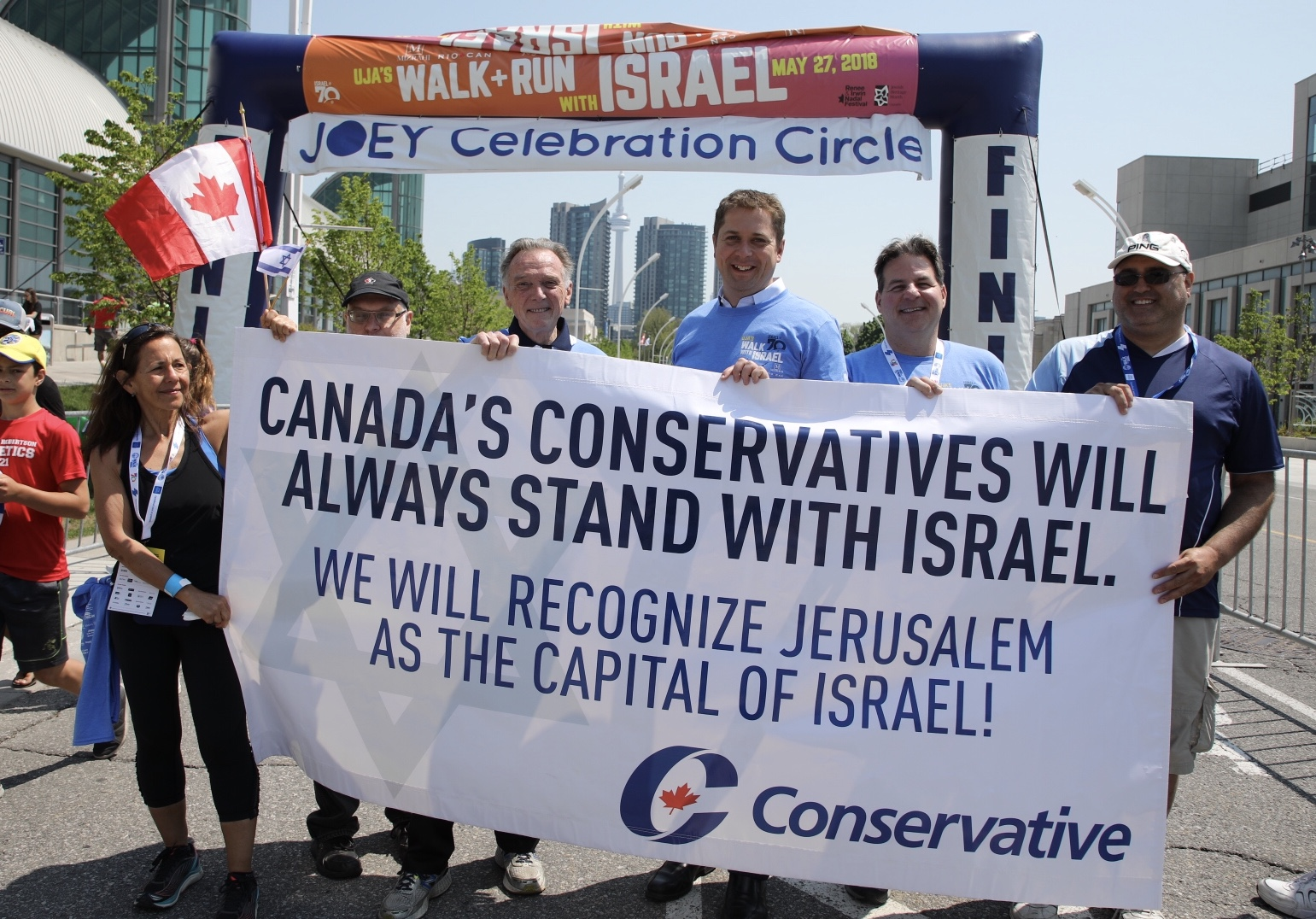
Peter Kent with then-party leader Andrew Scheer in 2018 stating their position of the status of Jerusalem. The Conservatives' support for Israel was partially responsible for the riding's political shift.

On February 23, 2004, Caplan announced that she would not run in the next federal election. The Liberals then chose Susan Kadis, who was then a Vaughan City Councillor, as their candidate for the next election. In the 2004 election, many ridings with large Jewish populations, Thornhill among them, started shifting toward the Conservative Party. The Liberal Party would end up losing 10% of the vote and they were now at 54.6%, about 20% more of the vote than Conservative candidate Josh Cooper. In the 2006 election, both Kadis and the Conservative candidate got slightly less votes than in 2004.

Shortly after the 2006 election, Kadis was chosen to be the associate critic for Infrastructure and Communities. In March 2008, she was appointed National Revenue critic by Opposition Leader Stéphane Dion. In the 2008 election, the Conservative Party chose Peter Kent, an established media personality who had run in St. Paul's in 2006, as their candidate. Kent would end up winning the riding with 49% of the vote compared to Kadis' 39%, possibly due to the fact that Conservative Prime Minister Stephen Harper promised continued support for Israel.

=== 2011-present: Conservative stronghold ===
Kent served as the Minister of State of Foreign Affairs for the Americas until a January 2011 cabinet shuffle when he was promoted to Minister of the Environment. This was met with some criticism as he was the fifth Environment Minister in five years. It also signalled Prime Minister Harper's determination to increase support in the Greater Toronto Area. In the 2011 election, the Conservative Party targeted the riding as part of their strategy to gain a majority government and both Prime Minister Harper and Liberal leader Michael Ignatieff had campaign stops in the riding. Kent ended up increasing his vote share to 61%, compared to 24% for the Liberal candidate.

During the 2012 redistribution, the area of the riding east of Bayview Avenue was divided along Highway 407, with portions being transferred to Richmond Hill and the new riding of Markham—Thornhill. Concerns were raised about dividing the Thornhill neighbourhood into two ridings, suggesting that Concord (which includes Vaughan Metropolitan Centre) be excluded from the riding instead. The name of the riding was also an issue, as the proposed name, "Vaughan—Thornhill" was thought to exclude the Markham portion. Markham was initially added to the name before Kent suggested reverting it back to "Thornhill". His suggestion was accepted by the commission. The redistributed result put the Conservatives 2% higher than the actual result. In July 2013, Kent was shuffled out of cabinet, becoming a backbench MP. During his tenure, critics had described him as "Canada's worst environment minister."

In the 2015 election, Kent lost about 5% of the vote, now receiving 58.6% to the Liberal candidate's 33.7%. Shortly after the 2015 election, Kent became the Conservative Foreign Affairs critic. After a 2017 shadow cabinet shuffle, Kent became the Conservatives' Ethics critic. In 2019, Kent won his fourth consecutive election with 54.6% of the vote to Liberal candidate Gary Gladstone's 35.4%. After the 2019 election, Kent was appointed critic on immigration, refugees, and citizenship. In 2021, Kent announced he would not run in the next election.

Following this, Melissa Lantsman won the nomination to represent the Conservative Party in Thornhill. On September 20, 2021, Melissa Lantsman won the riding of Thornhill by a 15-point margin. In the 2025 federal election, Lantsman was re-elected with 66.4% of the vote - the highest margin and popular vote share in the riding's history.

== Members of Parliament ==
This riding has elected the following members of the House of Commons of Canada:

Parliament	Years	Member	Party
Thornhill; Riding created from Markham—Whitchurch—Stouffville and York North
36th	1997–2000	Elinor Caplan	Liberal
37th	2000–2004	Elinor Caplan	Liberal
38th	2004–2006	Susan Kadis	Liberal
39th	2006–2008	Susan Kadis	Liberal
40th	2008–2011	Peter Kent	Conservative
41st	2011–2015	Peter Kent	Conservative
42nd	2015–2019	Peter Kent	Conservative
43rd	2019–2021	Peter Kent	Conservative
44th	2021–2025	Melissa Lantsman	Conservative
45th	2025–present	Melissa Lantsman	Conservative

== Election results ==
Graph of general election results in Thornhill (minor parties that never got 2% of the vote or didn't run consistently are omitted)

2025 Canadian federal election
Party	Candidate	Votes	%	±%	Expenditures
Conservative	Melissa Lantsman	44,419	66.40	+14.68	
Liberal	Liane Kotler	20,873	31.20	–4.86	
New Democratic	William McCarty	833	1.24	–4.73	
People's	Amir Hart	440	0.73	–3.87	
Green	Dominic Piotrowski	353	0.50	–1.14	
Total valid votes/expense limit		66,918			
Total rejected ballots		663			
Turnout		67,581	68.94		
Eligible voters		97,300			
Conservative notional hold		Swing		+9.61	
Source: Elections Canada

2021 federal election redistributed results
Party	Vote	%
Conservative	27,071	51.72
Liberal	18,876	36.06
New Democratic	3,126	5.97
People's	2,408	4.60
Green	861	1.64

2021 Canadian federal election
Party	Candidate	Votes	%	±%	Expenditures
Conservative	Melissa Lantsman	25,687	51.3%	-3.26%	$105,101.06
Liberal	Gary Gladstone	18,168	36.3%	+0.88%	$92,712.82
New Democratic	Raz Razvi	3,041	6.1%	-0.38%	$4,940.19
People's	Samuel Greenfield	2,322	4.6%	–	$9,751.81
Green	Daniella Mikanovsky	844	1.7%	-1.29%	$0.00
Total valid votes/expense limit		50,062	99.2	0.28	$114,997.02
Total rejected ballots		390	0.77	-0.31	
Turnout		50,452	58.8	-4.82	
Eligible voters		85,739	76.06%	0.66%	
Conservative hold		Swing		-4.14	
Source: Elections Canada

2019 Canadian federal election
Party	Candidate	Votes	%	±%	Expenditures
Conservative	Peter Kent	29,187	54.56	-4.00	$70,899.51
Liberal	Gary Gladstone	18,946	35.42	+1.66	$82,017.28
New Democratic	Sara Petrucci	3,469	6.48	+1.32	$1.38
Green	Josh Rachlis	1,600	2.99	+1.84	none listed
Rhinoceros	Nathan Bregman	217	0.41	–	$0.00
Canada's Fourth Front	Waseem Malik	77	0.14	–	none listed
Total valid votes/expense limit		53,496	98.92		111,210.50
Total rejected ballots		583	1.08	+0.49	
Turnout		54,079	63.62	-3.50	
Eligible voters		85,005	75.4%	–	
Conservative hold		Swing		-2.83	
Source: Elections Canada

2015 Canadian federal election
Party	Candidate	Votes	%	±%	Expenditures
Conservative	Peter Kent	31,911	58.56	-4.63	$123,230.74
Liberal	Nancy Coldham	18,395	33.76	+11.26	$55,910.58
New Democratic	Lorne Cherry	2,814	5.16	-6.33	$6,832.09
Green	Josh Rachlis	627	1.15	-1.33	–
Libertarian	Gene Balfour	587	1.08	–	$202.00
Seniors	Margaret Leigh Fairbairn	157	0.29	–	$4,584.13
Total valid votes/expense limit		54,491	99.41		$216,565.52
Total rejected ballots		324	0.59	–	
Turnout		54,815	67.12	–	
Eligible voters		81,672			
Source: Elections Canada

2011 federal election redistributed results
Party	Vote	%
Conservative	29,140	63.19
Liberal	10,373	22.49
New Democratic	5,299	11.49
Green	1,142	2.48
Others	160	0.35

2011 Canadian federal election
Party	Candidate	Votes	%	±%	Expenditures
Conservative	Peter Kent	36,629	61.38	+12.37	$85,817.95
Liberal	Karen Mock	14,125	23.67	-15.76	$89,258.36
New Democratic	Simon Strelchik	7,141	11.97	+5.35	$5,397.91
Green	Norbert Koehl	1,562	2.62	-2.32	$11,470.40
Animal Alliance	Liz White	215	0.36	–	$7,002.05
Total valid votes/expense limit		59,672	100.00	–	$99,784.20
Total rejected ballots		275	0.46	–	
Turnout		59,947	60.98	–	
Eligible voters		98,312	–	–	
Source: Elections Canada

2008 Canadian federal election
Party	Candidate	Votes	%	±%	Expenditures
Conservative	Peter Kent	26,660	49.01	+15.30	$91,400
Liberal	Susan Kadis	21,448	39.43	-13.67	$62,484
New Democratic	Simon Strelchik	3,601	6.62	-1.19	$4,835
Green	Norbert Koehl	2,686	4.94	+1.51	$7,314
Total valid votes/expense limit		54,395	100.00	–	$95,547
Source: Elections Canada

2006 Canadian federal election
Party	Candidate	Votes	%	±%
Liberal	Susan Kadis	29,934	53.10	-1.48
Conservative	Anthony Reale	19,005	33.71	-0.75
New Democratic	Simon Strelchik	4,405	7.81	+0.83
Green	Lloyd Helferty	1,934	3.43	+0.35
Progressive Canadian	Mark Abramowitz	1,094	1.94	
Total valid votes		56,372	100.00	
Source: Elections Canada

2004 Canadian federal election
Party	Candidate	Votes	%	±%
Liberal	Susan Kadis	28,709	54.58	-10.01
Conservative	Josh Cooper	18,125	34.46	+3.58
New Democratic	Rick Morelli	3,671	6.98	+3.05
Green	Lloyd Helferty	1,622	3.08	
Independent	Benjamin Fitzerman	241	0.46	
Independent	Simion Iron	233	0.44	
Total valid votes		52,601	100.00	
Source: Elections Canada

Note: Conservative vote is compared to the total of the Canadian Alliance vote and Progressive Conservative vote in 2000 election.

2000 Canadian federal election
Party	Candidate	Votes	%	±%
Liberal	Elinor Caplan	27,152	64.59	+5.59
Alliance	Robert Goldin	6,643	15.80	+7.91
Progressive Conservative	Lou Watson	6,338	15.08	-11.31
New Democratic	Nathan Rotman	1,653	3.93	-0.67
Canadian Action	Art Jaszczyk	254	0.60	
Total valid votes		42,040	100.00	
Source: Elections Canada

Note: Canadian Alliance vote is compared to the Reform vote in 1997 election.

1997 Canadian federal election
Party	Candidate	Votes	%
Liberal	Elinor Caplan	25,747	59.00
Progressive Conservative	Bill Fisch	11,517	26.39
Reform	Aurel David	3,441	7.89
New Democratic	Helen Breslauer	2,008	4.60
Independent	Rick Levine	303	0.69
Natural Law	Linda Martin	261	0.60
Independent	Sid Soban	238	0.55
Independent	Shel Bergson	124	0.28
Total valid votes		43,639	100.00
Source: Elections Canada

1993 federal election redistributed results
Party	%
Liberal	60
Progressive Conservative	20
Reform	14
New Democratic	3

== Student vote results ==
2025 Thornhill student vote
60.15%	19.14%	8.16%	7.35%	5.21%
Conservative	Liberal	Green	NDP	PPC

== See also ==
- List of Canadian electoral districts
- Historical federal electoral districts of Canada

== Sources ==
- Riding history from the Library of Parliament
- 2011 results from Elections Canada
- Campaign expense data from Elections Canada
