= Max, the 2000-Year-Old Mouse =

1967 Canadian animated TV series

- Directed by: Shamus Culhane
- Narrated by: Bernard Cowan
- Country of origin: Canada
- No. of episodes: 104

Production
- Producer: Steve Krantz
- Running time: 5.5 minutes
- Production companies: Grantray-Lawrence Animation; Al Guest Studios; Krantz Films

Original release
- Network: ITV; CBC
- Release: 1967 – 1992

Max, the 2000-Year-Old Mouse is a 1967 Canadian animated television series produced by Steve Krantz, which originally aired on the Canadian Broadcasting Corporation in Canada in 1967 and became popular in several parts of the world, most notably the United States, where it was syndicated on both local and PBS stations between 1969 and 1979, and also the United Kingdom, where it was repeated numerous times on the ITV network between its original transmission in 1969 and its last showing to date in 1992.

== Overview ==
The series was an educational show, aimed at children, in which still pictures and limited animations told stories about important figures and key events in Western and sometimes Eastern history. 104 episodes were made in total, each running at five and a half minutes in length.

The episodes were filmed quickly and cheaply, and the premise of the show was simple. An episode typically begins in a room in a museum, with artifacts on display while the unseen and unnamed narrator (Bernard Cowan) introduces the era and historical person(s) to be featured. Key figures whose biographies were explored in the series included Paul Revere, Buffalo Bill, and Daniel Boone, among many others, with Max dubiously claiming to have helped all of them over the course of his very long life.

A few years later, Krantz reused the general format (and voice cast) for the similar series The Wonderful Stories of Professor Kitzel. The show's theme music was also later used by Siskel and Ebert's movie review series for PBS, Sneak Previews.

== Max ==
Max, voiced by Paul Soles, is a pink mouse who lived in the museum, essentially served as comic relief and also helped with the narration, while repeatedly claiming to have been a witness of and/or participant in various historical events. Footage of Max, set in the past or present, typically shows him as comically clumsy with contemporary tools and weapons like Mister Peabody.

== Episodes ==
- Leonardo da Vinci
- Buffalo Bill
- Paul Revere
- Daniel Boone
- Crazy Horse
- Marie Curie
- Peter the Great
- Davy Crockett
- David and Goliath
- Elizabeth I
- Johnny Appleseed
- Lewis and Clark
- Manfred von Richthofen
- Thomas Edison
- William the Conqueror
- Henry Ford
- Louis Pasteur
- Wright Brothers
- Jesse James
- Simon Bolivar
- Vikings
- The Alamo
- San Francisco Earthquake
- David Livingstone
- Building the Railroad
- John L. Sullivan
- Henry VIII
- 100 Years War
- Julius Caesar
- Robin Hood
- The Bastille
- Napoleon Bonaparte
- Hannibal
- Panama Canal
- Zenobia
- Horatio Nelson
- Mutiny On The Bounty
- Columbus
- Mark Twain
- Reptilia
