= Harold Freeman =

Harold Freeman may refer to:

- Harold Freeman (rugby union) (1850–1916), English rugby union player
- Harold P. Freeman (1933–2026), American physician
- Harold Freeman (fl. 1980s), defendant in the case of People v. Freeman

== See also ==
- Harry Freeman (disambiguation)
- Harold Freedman (1915–1999), Australian illustrator and lithographer
