= The Naked Mind =

- Genre: Current affairs
- Presented by: Lorraine Thomson
- Country of origin: Canada
- Original language: English
- No. of seasons: 1
- No. of episodes: 4

Production
- Producer: Garth Price
- Running time: 30 minutes

Original release
- Network: CBC Television
- Release: 9 September – 7 October 1974

The Naked Mind is a Canadian current affairs television program on mental health that aired on CBC Television in 1974.

== Premise ==
The program, hosted by Lorraine Thomson, featured drama segments to illustrate various mental health conditions. These were selected scenes from such plays as Anne of Green Gables, The Devil's Disciple, The Four Poster, Harvey, Johnny Belinda, My Fair Lady and Saint Joan. This was accompanied by discussion by a panel which represented various occupations such as sociologists, journalists, actors and theatrical leaders. Henry Morgan, a humorist, appeared in all episodes.

This program was based on a May 1973 hour-long special broadcast of the same name. Two of the four episodes were recorded in Halifax, the remainder in Toronto. A studio audience was present for each episode.

== Scheduling ==
This half-hour program was broadcast on Mondays at 10:00 p.m. from 9 September to 7 October 1974.
