= Max Ferguson =

Canadian radio personality, satirist, and actor (1924–2013)

Max Ferguson OC
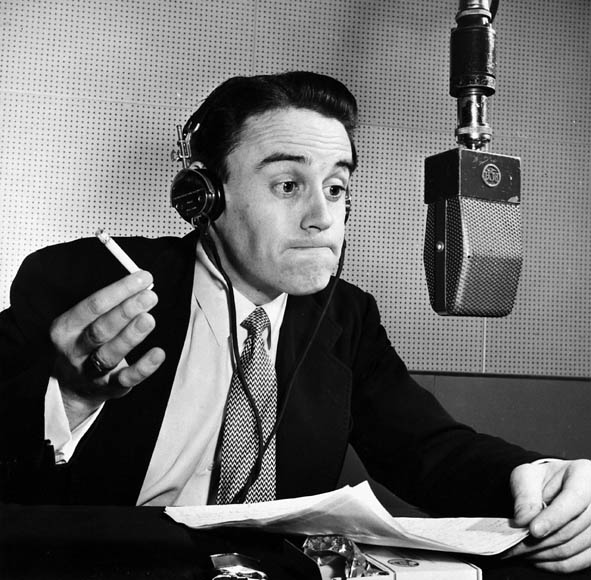
- Ferguson during a radio broadcast, c. 1951.
- Born: February 10, 1924; Crook, Durham, England
- Died: 7 March 2013 (aged 89); Cobourg, Ontario
- Occupations: Radio host, satirist
- Years active: 1946–1998
- Employer: Canadian Broadcasting Corporation
- Notable work: Rawhide; The Max Ferguson Show
- Spouses: Norma Fraser (m. 1949, divorced); Pauline Janitch (m. 1979)
- Children: 6

Max Ferguson, OC (February 10, 1924 – March 7, 2013) was a Canadian radio personality and satirist, best known for his long-running radio programs Rawhide and The Max Ferguson Show on the Canadian Broadcasting Corporation (CBC).

== Biography ==
=== Early life ===
Max Ferguson was born on February 10, 1924, in Crook, County Durham in England, the second son of William George (George) Ferguson and Isabella Frances (Isabel) née Finnegan.

In 1926, when Ferguson was two years old, he and his family emigrated to Canada, departing from Cobh, Ireland on May 22 aboard the Minnedosa. They arrived in Montreal, Quebec on May 29 and eventually settled in Ontario.

Ferguson was raised in London, Ontario, and graduated from the University of Western Ontario with a BA in English and French.

=== Career ===
In the summer of 1946, Ferguson was hired as an announcer at radio station CFPL in London, but later that year relocated to Halifax, Nova Scotia, for the opportunity to join the CBC as a staff announcer with the local station in the CBC Halifax Radio Building. According to his autobiography, And Now...Here's Max (1967), he was appalled to find among his assignments the task of hosting a cowboy music show called After Breakfast Breakdown. To protect his anonymity, and in hopes of quick reassignment, he improvised the character of "Old Rawhide", assuming the voice of an elderly ranch hand and giving colourfully disdainful appraisals of the songs he introduced. The character was a breath of fresh air to listeners of the staid national broadcaster, and they relayed their approval with volumes of mail. Accepting his fate, Ferguson devised an entire repertory company of raucous and bizarre characters to interact with Rawhide (all voiced by Ferguson) to amuse himself and his audience, creating daily skits which parodied literary classics and satirized current events and CBC personalities. Recurring characters (other than Rawhide) included pompous, adenoidal CBC announcer Marvin Mellobell, the Goomer Brothers, Little Harold, the Black Widow Spider, and the adventurous Granny.

In 1949, the show's popularity led the corporation to transfer Ferguson to its head office in Toronto, where he would broadcast nationally. Rawhide's first coast-to-coast broadcasts caused controversy when a Member of Parliament rose to denounce the show for its low humour and abuse of the English language. However, it remained popular and remained on the air for seventeen years, during which its genre was changed to esoteric folk music. He was also able to originate his broadcasts from his beloved Maritimes for several years in the mid-1950s. Between 1955 and 1960, Ferguson recorded three albums on Folkways Records, each a part of the Rawhide satirical series. From 1954 to 1961, while continuing the Rawhide radio program, Ferguson branched out to television to host the nightly CBC Halifax program Gazette and the CBC Toronto production Tabloid.

In 1962, Ferguson retired Rawhide and associated characters and launched the weekday Max Ferguson Show, featuring ethnic music and topical skits. The latter were always highlighted by Ferguson's impressions of prominent politicians and celebrities. Ferguson wrote his own topical sketches, based on the morning's news, and performed all the voices live-to-air. The show was introduced in grandiloquent fashion by fellow CBC announcer Allan McFee.

Ferguson was the subject of the 1966 National Film Board of Canada profile Max in the Morning, which detailed a typical morning spent preparing and hosting his radio show. The same year, he voiced the Hulk and his alter ego Bruce Banner in The Marvel Super Heroes. He also narrated several films, and wrote the whimsical children's story and its subsequent film short Has Anybody Seen My Umbrella? (1990).

While keeping the radio show going, Ferguson also branched out into television, co-hosting the CBC's daily afternoon talk show 55 North Maple from September 1970 to September 1971.

The radio show remained what Ferguson was best known for, however. The daily Max Ferguson Show wrapped up on June 25, 1971 after a 9 1/2-year run. Ferguson's final sketch featured Canadian politicians John Diefenbaker, Pierre Trudeau, and Robert Stanfield (all voiced by Ferguson) expressing relief that they would no longer be on the show.

After some time off, Ferguson returned to the CBC airwaves, appearing on Saturday morning. For this iteration of The Max Ferguson Show—which would run for over 25 years—Ferguson dropped the skits and relied exclusively on his outspoken charm and facility with the language, as well as his unique selection of offbeat music and comedy tracks. Long-time friend McFee -- who also hosted his own CBC Radio show, Eclectic Circus -- continued working as Ferguson's announcer, introducing the program and occasionally interacting with Ferguson in unscripted on-air banter. After McFee retired from the CBC in 1991, he was replaced by Shelagh Rogers, who had previously worked with Ferguson.

Ferguson retired from broadcasting in 1998, having spent over 50 years at the CBC. Over the years, he garnered many awards, including the 1968 Stephen Leacock Award for humour for his autobiography, And Now...Here's Max. He was appointed an Officer of The Order of Canada in 1970 and in 2001 was chosen as a recipient of the Governor General's Performing Arts Award for Lifetime Artistic Achievement. He was the recipient of the John Drainie Award and the Gordon Sinclair Award. He held honorary degrees from the University of Western Ontario, Dalhousie University, the University of Waterloo, Brock University and the University of Saskatchewan.

== Personal life ==
Ferguson married Norma Fraser on April 9, 1949, and the two had five children. They later divorced, with Ferguson marrying former CBC producer Pauline Janitch in 1979. The couple had one child, Tony Ferguson (born October 22, 1984).

Ferguson died of a heart attack on March 7, 2013, at the Northumberland Hills Hospital, Cobourg, Ontario, at the age of 89. He was survived by Janitch and his children.

== Published works ==
- And Now...Here's Max (1967; republished 2009 with new foreword by Shelagh Rogers)
- The Unmuzzled Max (1971)
- Has Anybody Seen My Umbrella?, illustrated by Jane Kurisu (1982)
