= Karen Mock =

Canadian human rights consultant

Karen Rochelle Mock, CM is a human rights consultant. She was Executive Director and CEO of the Canadian Race Relations Foundation from 2001 to 2005 and prior to that was National Director of the League for Human Rights of B'nai Brith Canada for twelve years, as well as executive director of the League’s Human Rights Education and Training Centre, after several years as a teacher educator.

== Family ==
Mock was born and raised in Toronto. She is married to Dr. David Mock, Professor and Dean Emeritus of the Faculty of Dentistry, University of Toronto. They have two sons - Steven, researcher and lecturer at the University of Waterloo, and Daniel, a musician, married to Ashley Miller, a counsellor.

== Career ==
Karen Mock was educated at the University of Toronto, earning her Ph.D. in Applied Psychology in 1975. Mock is a certified teacher and registered educational psychologist (ret.), specializing in human rights, hate crime and diversity issues and multicultural/anti-racist education. She has published widely in her field, and conducts many training programs in the public and private sectors. She has also been recognized by the Canadian courts and human rights tribunals as an expert on hate groups, hate group activity, discrimination, racism and antisemitism. Mock chaired the Canadian Advisory Committee to the Secretary of State and served as a member of the official Canadian Delegation to the World Conference Against Racism (WCAR) held in Durban, South Africa in 2001.

Over a period of twenty years, Mock taught courses in multiculturalism and race relations, developmental and educational psychology, and psychological testing and assessment at University of Toronto, Ryerson Polytechnical University and York University teaching courses in multiculturalism and race relations, developmental and educational psychology, and psychological testing and assessment, before going full time into human rights work.

Mock is a past president of the Canadian Friends of Haifa University, and of the Ontario Multicultural Association. She is a former member of the board of the Urban Alliance on Race Relations, and past chair of the Canadian Multiculturalism Advisory Committee.

Karen was appointed Chair of the Hate Crimes Community Working Group, reporting to the Government of Ontario in December 2006, and served as Senior Policy Advisor on Diversity and Equity to the Minister of Education for the development and delivery of Ontario’s Equity and Inclusive Education Strategy, that was released in April 2009.

Karen Mock is an active founding member of the Antiracist Multicultural Educators' Network of Ontario (AMENO) and its Equity Summit Group (ESG), the Women's Intercultural Network (WIN), the Canadian Association of Jews and Muslims (CAJM), and the Canadian Arab/Jewish Leadership Dialogue. She is a Past President of JSpaceCanada, a progressive Jewish organization, and past Chair of the Board of the Pearson Centre for Progressive Policy, a multi-partisan think tank. Karen currently coordinates the Enhancing Social Justice Education group, facilitating professional development sessions to increase inclusive approaches and develop to practical strategies to decrease polarization in schools, universities and workplaces.

== Political activity ==
Mock was nominated in September 2009 as the Liberal Party of Canada candidate for Member of Parliament in the Ontario riding of Thornhill, 2011 federal election. In the May 2011 election, Mock was defeated by incumbent Conservative MP and Environment Minister, Peter Kent.

== Awards ==
Mock received the International Women’s Day Award from the Women’s Intercultural Network(1999), was awarded an Honourable Mention as a YWCA Woman of Distinction (1993) and named to the Who’s Who of Canadian Women (1995). In 2005, she was designated a Woman of Influence by the University of Saskatchewan.

In 2002, she received the Excellence in Race Relations Award from the Human Rights Council of the Ahmadiyya Movement of Islam in Canada, was the 2004 recipient of the Sikh Centennial Foundation Award for Civil Liberties Advocacy, and was named an Eminent Woman of Peace in 2008 by the Department of Peace Initiative and Voices of Women in Ottawa. Mock is included as one of the 100 worldwide "Everyday Freedom Heroes" for her human rights and antiracism work, in a permanent display at the Freedom Center in Cincinnati, the U.S. National Museum to the Underground Railroad. She is a recipient of the Queen's Diamond Jubilee Medal for "service to peers, community and Canada."

In December 2017, Mock was appointed as a Member of the Order of Canada.
