= The Wonderful Stories of Professor Kitzel =

1972 American-Canadian animated TV series

The Wonderful Stories of Professor Kitzel is a 1972 educational animated series. Produced by Shamus Culhane for Krantz Films, the program combined film clips, animation, and commentary to teach the viewers about historic and cultural events. It was "hosted" by the eccentric scientist Professor Kitzel, whose voice was provided by Paul Soles, with occasional appearances by his grandfather or his parrot.

== Format ==
The format of each short (5 minute) episode, of which one hundred and six were produced in all, was generally an opening discussion by the professor introducing the subject. He would then take the viewer to his time machine, pull a lever and the first series of drawings and commentary related to the subject would begin. Halfway through the story, the professor would interrupt the commentary to make some humorous remark, before returning to the narrative with an invitation to "Let's see what happened next." Each episode concluded with some humorous closing sequence.

== Distribution ==
The series was offered in barter syndication by Bristol-Myers for their Pal Vitamins line from 1972 to 1976; after 1976, it was syndicated for cash by Worldvision Enterprises.

== Forerunner ==
The format of the series and style of presentation was similar to an earlier production, Max, the 2000-Year-Old Mouse, which utilized the same production house and voice cast.

== Episodes ==
1. Martin Frobisher
2. The Crusades
3. The Spartans
4. Charlemagne and the Elephant
5. Leonardo da Vinci
6. Samuel F.B. Morse
7. Profile of Japan
8. Mayan Archaeology
9. Charles Darwin (2)
10. The Sahara Desert
11. Charles Dickens
12. Thomas Edison
13. Buffalo Bill Cody
14. Joan of Arc
15. India (1)
16. Pilgrims
17. Montezuma and Cortés
18. Peary at the Pole
19. Edmund Hillary and Mount Everest
20. The Mississippi Steamboat
21. Reptiles
22. The Rosetta Stone
23. The South Pole
24. Auguste Piccard
25. Abba of Benin
26. India (2)
27. The Oracle of Delphi
28. Northwest Indians
29. Daniel Boone
30. Jacques Cartier
31. The Great London Fire
32. The Masai Warriors
33. Marco Polo
34. The Wright brothers
35. New Amsterdam
36. Athens and Sparta
37. Beavers
38. Romulus and Remus
39. The Buffalo Herds
40. Captain William Bligh
41. Peter the Great
42. Fur Trading
43. George Washington
44. Robert Perry
45. Egypt
46. The Vikings
47. The Phoenicians
48. Frederick Douglass
49. Al Rashid
50. Pioneers in Early America
51. The Early Boat Builders
52. Antoni van Leeuwenhoek
53. The African Gold Coast
54. Gorillas
55. The Picard Brothers
56. The Whaling Ships
57. Montgolfier
58. The Treasure Ships
59. The Eskimos
60. Prehistoric Man
61. Mount Olympus
62. Vasco de Gama
63. James Watt
64. The Middle Ages
65. California Gold Rush
66. Christopher Columbus
67. Louis Blériot
68. Peter the Hermit
69. Pueblo Indians
70. Kier and Drake
71. Abraham Lincoln
72. Guglielmo Marconi
73. Benjamin Franklin
74. Emperor Nero of Rome
75. The Covered Wagons
76. Easter Island
77. The Cave Paintings of Altamira
78. Louis Pasteur
79. The Search for Ancient Troy
80. Jacques Cousteau
81. The Statue of Liberty
82. John Cabot
83. John Smith and Pocahontas
84. The Middle Ages
85. Thor Heyerdahl
86. The Declaration of Independence
87. Johannes Gutenberg
88. The History of Rockets
89. Galileo Galilei
90. Early Man
91. Ponce de León
92. The Erie Canal
93. Charles Darwin (1)
94. The Duryea Brothers
95. Samuel De Champlain
96. The Customs of China
97. Michelangelo
98. Thomas Paine
99. Charles Lindbergh
100. Early Crete
101. The Australian Aborigines
102. Eskimo Life
103. Pompeii and Mount Vesuvius
104. Lewis Carroll
105. The Mystery of Stonehenge
