= Grant Simmons =

Grant Simmons may refer to:

- Grant Simmons (basketball) (born 1943), American basketball player
- Grant Simmons (footballer) (born 1952), Australian rules footballer
- Grant Simmons (marketer) (born 1961), Marketing professional, author, and speaker
