= Lorraine Thomson =

Canadian dancer (1931–2020)

- Born: July 12, 1931; Regina, Saskatchewan, Canada
- Died: August 13, 2020 (aged 89); Toronto, Ontario, Canada
- Occupation(s): dancer, television personality, television producer
- Known for: Interviewer on CBC Television, co-founder of ACTRA Awards

Lorraine Thomson (July 12, 1931 – August 13, 2020) was a Canadian dancer, television host, television producer and one of the co-founders, with Pierre Berton, of the ACTRA Awards. She was the first dancer hired by the CBC for their first televised variety show, The Big Revue, and made regular appearances as a dancer and actor on many television shows in the first decade of Canadian broadcasting. She turned to radio hosting in the 1960s, and then television hosting in the 1970s for CBC's The Naked Mind, The Weaker(?) Sex and V.I.P. She was one of the first women to produce variety shows on CBC, and for 18 years, she was the program coordinator for Front Page Challenge. She was nominated for several national awards for her work both in front of and behind the camera.

== Dancer ==
Thomson was born in Regina, Saskatchewan before her family moved to Toronto in 1945. After a childhood illness, she took up dance to speed her recovery. Although she studied several types of dance, she soon began to concentrate on ballet under Boris Volkoff, Betty Oliphant and Gweneth Lloyd; she also took summer classes in New York City.

In 1951, while in New York, she successfully auditioned for the Radio City Music Hall Rockettes and the touring company of Kiss Me Kate, but decided to return to Toronto, where she married her first husband, danced for various open-air productions, and taught ballet for Gweneth Lloyd at the Canadian School of Ballet.

In 1952, the new television department of the Canadian Broadcasting Corporation prepared to go on air with Canada's first live televised variety show, The Big Revue. Thomson auditioned with 110 other dancers for a spot on the three-person chorus line; she was the first dancer hired. There were many challenges and mishaps in the age of live television. On one show, Thomson was struck in the head by a swinging microphone boom just before going on-camera, and although she completed her routine, she couldn't remember anything about her dance afterwards; on another show, she had to walk down a set of stairs wearing a feathered costume while trying to hold on to two pigeons that were doing their best to frantically fly away. During the first decade of Canadian television, Thomson performed regularly on Wayne & Shuster, The Barris Beat, The Denny Vaughan Show, and Hit Parade (Canadian TV series), and also appeared as an actor in various live dramas. She also met or worked with both established stars such as Duke Ellington—who told her "I'm going to tickle the ivories, then I'm going to tickle you"—as well as then-unknowns like Norman Jewison — at the time the studio director on The Big Revue — singer Robert Goulet, and a young folksinger named Gordon Lightfoot, who told everyone in the CBC cafeteria that he was going to be a star.

In 1958, Thomson was elected to the board of ACTRA as a dancer representative. She would continue to serve ACTRA in many capacities over the next forty years, including as vice-president in 1975.

== Radio and television host ==
As her career progressed, Thomson moved from variety shows to current affairs programs. On the lifestyle show Open House (1960–62), she demonstrated exercises. She was an interviewer on Tabloid and Seven-O-One. And she was also a frequent guest panellist on Front Page Challenge.

In 1963 Thomson was choreographer for the television program Juliette (starring Canadian singer Juliette), but also started hosting the CBC radio program Audio. When she sat behind the microphone for Four for Forty, she became the first woman to host a radio game show.

In 1969, Thomson moved back in front of the television camera as host of The Weaker (?) Sex, and as a guest actor in the short-lived CBC detective series McQueen.

In 1970, she also took on a behind-the-scenes role as program coordinator for Front Page Challenge, a position she was to fill for the next 18 years, booking the mystery guests, preparing research and doing the pre-interviews with guests. Many of the guests provided special challenges backstage: Prime Minister Pierre Trudeau playfully tried to pull Thomson on-camera with him during a live show in 1974. Sarah Churchill showed up at the studio intoxicated; when Thomson tried to take her back to her hotel to get her sobered up before the taping, Churchill began hitting Thomson with her purse.

Front Page Challenge was only thirty minutes long, and because the panel had to guess the identity of each mystery guest, there wasn't much time left for an interview; some viewers complained that the very brief interviews didn't give the guests a chance to tell their stories. What was needed was a second opportunity for an in-depth interview with each guest. In 1973, this resulted in V.I.P., a nationally televised program hosted by Thomson, where she re-interviewed the special guests from Front Page Challenge at length. Her guests included Lord Thomson of Fleet, Martha Mitchell—who insisted Thomson search her hotel room for spies, since Mitchell was convinced she was being followed -- Harrison Salisbury, Clare Booth Luce, Sir Edward Heath, Ken Read, Chief Dan George, Buzz Aldrin, Clement Freud, Butterfly McQueen, Anna Russell, June Havoc and Lorne Greene. In its first season, V.I.P garnered over a million viewers each week. It would subsequently air for ten years. In 1981, Thomson was a finalist for the ACTRA award for Best Host Television for her work on V.I.P. In 1970, while sharing a taxi with actor Bruno Gerussi, Thomson and Gerussi conceived of the idea for an awards show that would honour Canadian radio and television. Two years later, she and author Pierre Berton co-founded the ACTRA Awards and for the next 8 years, Thomson would continue to co-ordinate the Awards with ACTRA and CBC Television.

In 1974, as a member of the Board of the Canadian Mental Health Association, she created and hosted the panel show The Naked Mind to examine issues around mental health. In addition to discussion by experts, the four-part program illustrated those issues with excerpts from famous plays performed by well-known Canadian actors.

Thomson was one of the first women to produce variety specials for CBC Television, including Juliette’s Favourite Things, and in 1988, she was a Best Variety Program finalist for a Gemini award as producer of Gordon Pinsent Sings Those Hollywood Songs.

In 1989, she retired from broadcasting to accept an appointment to the Canadian Immigration and Refugee Board.

== Personal life ==
Thomson had two children from her first marriage. Her second marriage, to CBC journalist Knowlton Nash in 1982, would continue until Nash's death in 2014.
