= Peter Kent =

Former Canadian politician

The Honourable Peter Kent PC
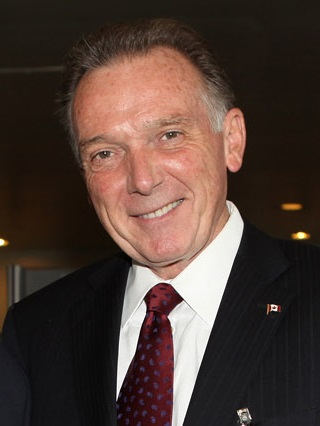

Minister of the Environment
- In office January 4, 2011 – July 15, 2013
- Prime Minister: Stephen Harper
- Preceded by: John Baird
- Succeeded by: Leona Aglukkaq

Chair of the Standing Committee on National Defence
- In office October 29, 2013 – February 4, 2016
- Minister: Rob Nicholson; Jason Kenney; Harjit Sajjan
- Preceded by: James Bezan
- Succeeded by: Robert Nault

Minister of State for Foreign Affairs (Americas)
- In office November 4, 2008 – January 4, 2011
- Prime Minister: Stephen Harper
- Preceded by: Position established
- Succeeded by: Position abolished

Member of Parliament for Thornhill
- In office October 14, 2008 – September 20, 2021
- Preceded by: Susan Kadis
- Succeeded by: Melissa Lantsman

Personal details
- Born: James Peter Kent; July 27, 1943 (age 83) Sussex, United Kingdom
- Party: Canadian Future
- Other political affiliations: Conservative Party of Canada
- Spouse: Cilla Kent
- Children: Trilby Kent
- Profession: News editor

James Peter Kent PC (born July 27, 1943) is a retired Canadian journalist and politician who served as the Conservative Member of Parliament for the riding of Thornhill from 2008 to 2021. He served as Minister of the Environment in the government of Prime Minister Stephen Harper. Before entering politics, he was the anchor of CBC Television's The National, and served as the Deputy Editor of the Global Television Network, a Canadian TV network. He has worked as a news editor, producer, foreign correspondent, and news anchorman on Canadian and American television networks.

== Background ==
Kent was born in Sussex, England in a Canadian Army hospital. Both his parents were serving with the Canadian Army. The family moved to Canada and, after a period in Ottawa, settled in Medicine Hat, Alberta. His parents were Aileen Marie (née Fears) and Arthur Parker Kent, both now deceased. The elder Kent was a long-time employee of the Southam Newspaper Group who retired as associate editor of the Calgary Herald. Peter Kent's younger brother, Arthur, is also a journalist, known in the first Gulf War as the "scud stud". Kent has three sisters: Adele, Norma and Susan. Norma was a local news anchor at CBC Windsor for a number of years before becoming co-host of the CBC consumer affairs programme Marketplace. She continues to work as a journalist. Susan Kent Davidson died of cancer in 2014. She was a writer and book editor, a committed member of the New Democratic Party, and the widow of the UTP editor Rik Davidson.

Peter Kent is married to Cilla, a former print journalist with South Africa's Argus newspaper group (a Cape Town paper now part of the Irish-based Independent News & Media) for over 26 years. They have a daughter, Trilby, who published her first novel, Medina Hill, in October 2009.

Kent was a member of the board of Canadian Coalition for Democracies and has represented them at public events such as a demonstration supporting publication of the controversial Muhammed cartoons.

Kent is a member of the Canadian Broadcast Hall of Fame and a past member of the Board of the Academy of Canadian Cinema and Television. He is also a Founding Supporter of Canadians for Defence and Security and was a member of the board of the revitalized ParticipACTION. He was a board member of the pro-Israel media advocacy group Honest Reporting Canada, and co-Chair of Ontario Cabinet for the Canadian Museum for Human Rights.

== Journalism ==
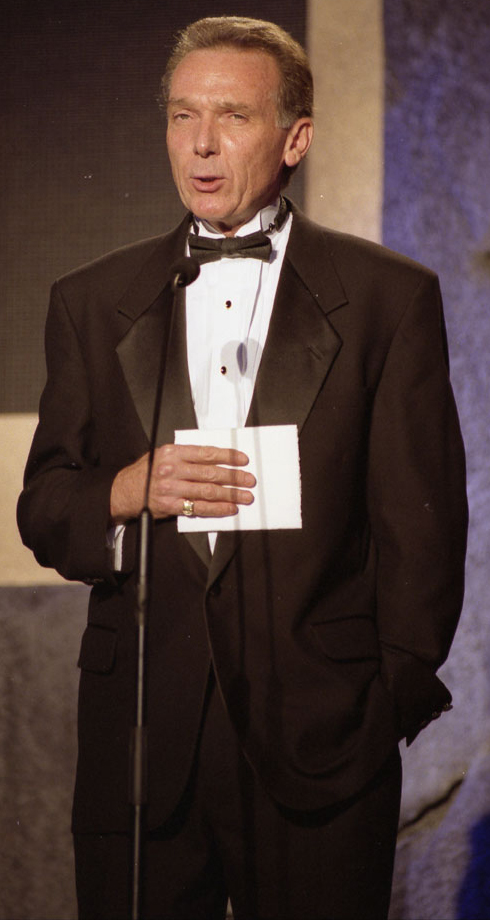
Kent at the 2000 Gemini Awards.

Kent began his career as a radio journalist in the early 1960s. He then moved to television, joining Calgary station CFCN-TV in 1965 and subsequently worked for CBC Television, CTV, Global, NBC and The Christian Science Monitor's television newscast.

In 1966, he went to South East Asia to cover the Vietnam War as a freelance foreign correspondent. He stayed on to cover the final withdrawal of US troops from Vietnam in 1973 and covered the fall of Cambodia to the Khmer Rouge in 1975. Kent returned to Canada and worked as a producer for CBC's The National and, in 1976, he became the broadcast's anchorman after Lloyd Robertson moved to CTV News.

In 1978 Kent agreed to step down as anchorman of The National after he submitted an intervention to the Canadian Radio-television and Telecommunications Commission (CRTC) recommending that the corporation's licence not be renewed until management created procedures and protocols to prevent political interference in the CBC's editorial decision-making. Kent's complaint involved messages conveyed through the then CBC President Al Johnson from the Prime Minister's Office that resulted in cancellation of a speech by Premier René Lévesque and coverage of a speech by Prime Minister Pierre Trudeau. As a result of his intervention and descent from The National anchor desk, Kent accepted assignment to the newly created African Bureau of the CBC, located in Johannesburg.

The CBC subsequently created protocols to govern Prime Ministerial access to the public broadcaster. They remain in effect today, and the most recent example was the speech made to the country by Prime Minister Jean Chrétien on the eve of the 1995 Quebec referendum. Kent returned briefly in 1978 to testify at a grievance hearing initiated by an unsuccessful anchor candidate who complained that Knowlton Nash, the vice-president of CBC News, had appointed himself to succeed Kent. In that testimony Kent—the first journalist to anchor The National—supported Nash's credentials.

Kent returned to Canada and the CBC in 1982 as a founding producer, correspondent and occasional co-host of The Journal, hosted by Barbara Frum and Mary Lou Finlay.

On January 24, 1984, the CBC television program The Journal broadcast a full edition documentary called "The Greenhouse Effect and Planet Earth," hosted, narrated and written by Kent. Broadcast nearly 40 years ago, this may be one of the first major media reports on the subject. Kent concluded with these words: "The greenhouse effect must be considered as the world's greatest environmental concern."

In 1984 Kent moved to NBC serving in Miami, Washington and New York bureaus and as the US network's senior European correspondent in the late 1980s, winning four Emmy nominations with the network. He then reported for and was back-up anchorman for John Hart and John Palmer at The Christian Science Monitor's World Monitor television news service. One of Kent's feature report series - on challenges in American inner cities - was awarded the Robert F. Kennedy Award.

In 1987, Peter Kent was a reporter on the team that produced the documentary “Six Days Plus 20 Years: A Dream Is Dying” which was condemned by both the Israeli left and right, including Premier Yitzhak Shamir, Foreign Minister Shimon Peres and Defense Minister Yitzhak Rabin, who were some of several Israeli government officials who refused to engage with NBC for a period of time afterwards. Kent returned to Canada to join Global News in 1992, and was the anchorman of its flagship news program First National until 2001. He then anchored the business news show MoneyWise on Global and Prime.

== Political career ==
=== Early political career ===
In the 2006 federal election, Kent ran as the Conservative Party of Canada candidate in the Toronto riding of St. Paul's. He placed second with 25.76% of the vote against the incumbent, Carolyn Bennett of the Liberals (50.25%), and ahead of Paul Summerville of the New Democratic Party (19.19%).

Kent ran again for the Conservatives in the 2008 election, this time in the riding of Thornhill, and was elected, defeating incumbent Susan Kadis by 5200 votes.

Kent was named to the junior cabinet post of Minister of State of Foreign Affairs (Americas) several weeks after the election. In an interview with journalist Steve Paikin on December 7, 2009, Kent acknowledged that as Minister, he is instructed to only use language vetted by the PMO, on occasion lifting Stephen Harper's statements from newspaper reports: "So when we're asked about the Israeli position on settlements, we never criticize Israel publicly. We say those settlements are 'unhelpful' in finding a comprehensive peace settlement. We've put on the record our position on nuclear power and India. We say 'it's no longer the 1970's, it's now 2009.' I saw the prime minister's quote in the newspapers to that effect yesterday, and so I used it today." Kent's comment that his government does not criticize Israel publicly was contradicted several months later by his senior minister, Lawrence Cannon, who went on record in the House of Commons "condemning" Israel's expansion of illegal settlements.

=== Minister of the Environment ===
In a cabinet shuffle on January 4, 2011, Kent was named Minister of the Environment.

In November 2011, Kent participated in the Durban Conference and in December of the same year announced that Canada would formally begin the process to withdraw from the Kyoto Protocol on climate change. Kent stated that “Kyoto, for Canada, is in the past,” predicted that other countries would also abandon Kyoto, and expressed his hope that a new agreement could be forged by 2015 that included the United States and China, the top two polluters. Kent claimed that the only way for Canada to avoid paying $14 billion of carbon offset penalties for failing to meet its Kyoto commitments was to withdraw, although there is no mechanism for fines in Kyoto, and Canada could have joined countries such as Japan that stayed in Kyoto without accepting new targets.

While defending the withdrawal from Kyoto during the December 14, 2011 session of the Canadian House of Commons, Kent criticized NDP Environment Critic Megan Leslie for not being at the Durban Conference despite his ministry having banned participation from all opposition MPs. During the heckling from opposition MPs over this statement, Justin Trudeau shouted "You piece of shit!" at Kent, but later apologized for losing his temper over Kent's statements regarding opposition participation in Durban. In December 2012, Canada became the first country to formally withdraw from the Kyoto Protocol.

As Minister of the Environment, Kent was a vocal supporter of the development of the oil sands, in line with the Conservative government's stated economic priorities.

In a CBC interview, Kent stated there is no evidence that the oil sands developments are polluting the Athabasca River. His statement was later contrasted by a "secret" Environment Canada presentation released under FOI. The presentation highlights contamination of the Athabasca River as a high-profile concern. Citing elevated levels of pollutants near mining sites including hydrocarbons and heavy metals, possible effects on health of wildlife and downstream communities, and questioning current government data which is unable to generate a "big picture" view of impacts on the ecosystem.

Kent was an advocate of improving the Species At Risk Act, in particular making it apply to whole ecosystems rather than just individual species.

==== Legacy ====
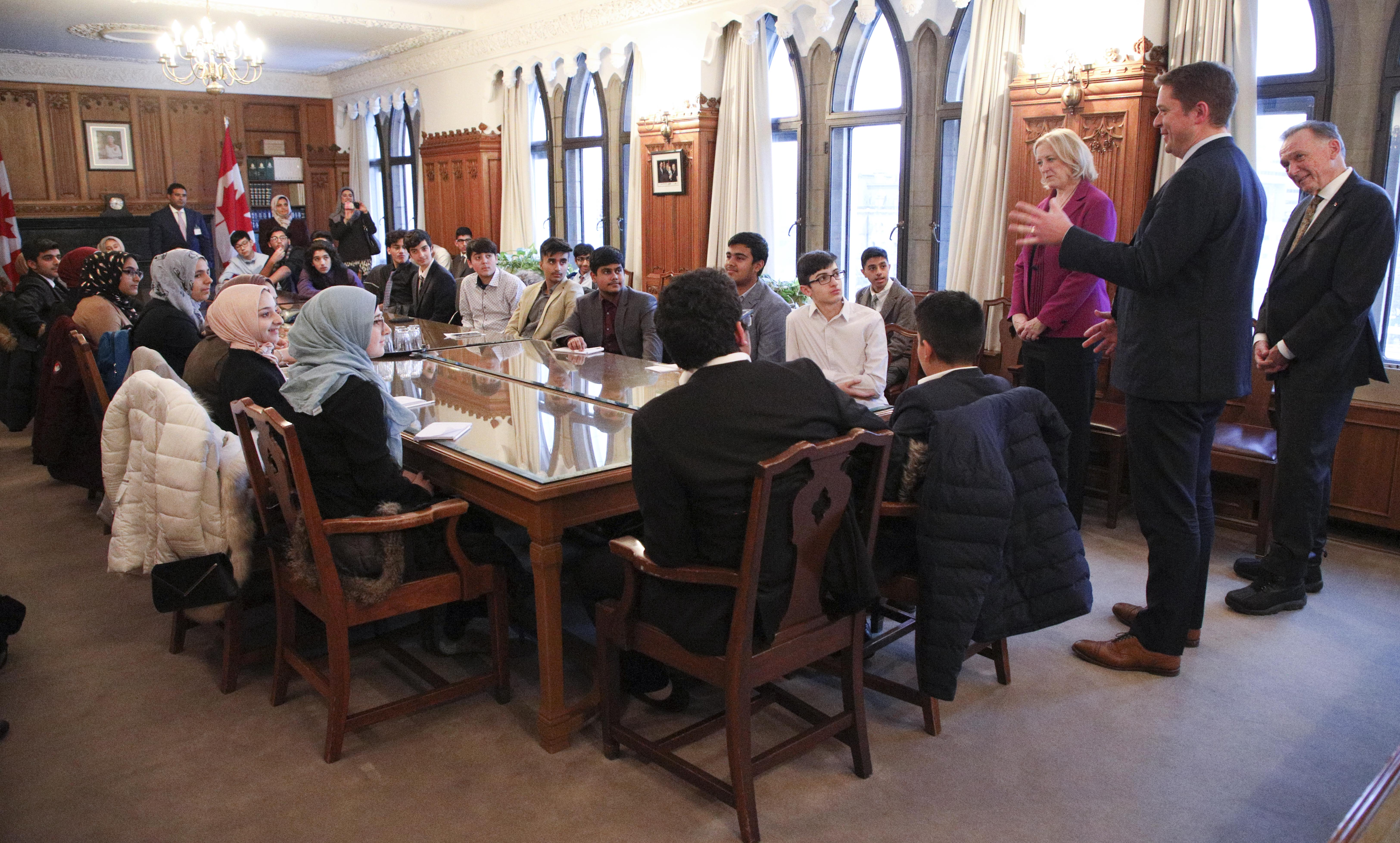
Kent (extreme right) meeting students during a school trip to Parliament Hill in 2018.

Kent was demoted from cabinet in the summer of 2013, shortly after his 70th birthday, in a cabinet shuffle which Prime Minister Harper described as "generational change" in order to make room for younger MPs to become ministers. He has been described by some critics such as environmentalist Rick Smith as "Canada's Worst Environment Minister Ever" for allegedly being a "green rubber stamp for destructive, ill-considered, industrial behaviour, all while glibly blaming "foreign interests" for meddling with Canada's overwhelmingly foreign-owned oil and gas sector" by restricting the ability of environmental assessment to limit pipeline construction, walking away from the Kyoto Protocol after the country had signed it, reducing protection for lakes and rivers, disbanding the National Round Table on the Environment and the Economy on the basis NRTEE had become an anachronistic entity.

Kent has named his accomplishments as being wastewater regulation, changes to the Species at Risk Act and overseeing greenhouse gas regulations for vehicle emissions, regulation of Canada's coal-fired electricity sector and banning the construction of any new coal-fired generating units. He regrets he was unable to convince cabinet colleagues to implement greenhouse gas regulations for the oil and gas industry.

=== Backbench ===
As a backbench MP, Kent called on the government to fund HPV vaccinations for boys, in addition to current vaccination programs for girls, after he survived a bout with throat and tongue cancer at the end of 2013. He also criticized the Harper government for drawing up an "enemies list" of uncooperative bureaucrats and hostile stakeholders.

Prior to his demotion from cabinet, Kent stated his intention of running in the 2015 federal election. During the election campaign, Kent tweeted a photo that falsely showed an ISIS fighter posing as a refugee to bolster his argument for "refugee screening". After the claim was debunked, Kent retracted and deleted the tweet.

Kent was re-elected in both the 2015 and 2019 elections. He announced on November 23, 2020, that he would not be running in the next federal election.

On September 17, 2021, he attended a protest with residents and municipal politicians in his riding and neighbourhood of Thornhill (split between the cities of Markham and Vaughan) opposing a route change for the proposed Yonge North subway extension, that would take the line from under Yonge Street and have it pass under homes, concerned it could potentially create noise and vibrations from passing subway trains. He was unsuccessful in convincing Metrolinx (the line's provincial planning agency) to route the subway back under Yonge, though Metrolinx did revise the plan by increasing the planned tunnel depth and reducing the number of homes the line would pass under.

He left office on September 21, 2021, just five days after the protest, when parliament was dissolved for the 2021 Canadian federal election.

== Electoral record ==
2019 Canadian federal election: Thornhill
Party	Candidate	Votes	%	±%	Expenditures
Conservative	Peter Kent	29,187	54.56	-4.00	$70,899.51
Liberal	Gary Gladstone	18,946	35.42	+1.66	$82,017.28
New Democratic	Sara Petrucci	3,469	6.48	+1.32	$1.38
Green	Josh Rachlis	1,600	2.99	+1.84	none listed
Rhinoceros	Nathan Bregman	217	0.41	–	$0.00
Canada's Fourth Front	Waseem Malik	77	0.14	–	none listed
Total valid votes/expense limit		53,496	98.92		111,210.50
Total rejected ballots		583	1.08	+0.49	
Turnout		54,079	63.62	-3.50	
Eligible voters		85,005	75.4%	–	
Conservative hold		Swing		-2.83	
Source: Elections Canada

2015 Canadian federal election: Thornhill
Party	Candidate	Votes	%	±%	Expenditures
Conservative	Peter Kent	31,911	58.60	-4.59	–
Liberal	Nancy Coldham	18,395	33.80	+11.31	–
New Democratic	Lorne Cherry	2,814	5.20	-6.29	–
Green	Josh Rachlis	627	1.20	-1.28	–
Libertarian	Gene Balfour	587	1.10	–	–
Seniors	Margaret Leigh Fairbairn	157	0.30	–	–
Total valid votes/Expense limit		54,491	100.0		$215,928.93
Total rejected ballots		324	0.59	+0.13	
Turnout		54,815	67.20	+6.22	
Eligible voters		81,106			
Conservative hold		Swing		-7.95	
Source: Elections Canada

2011 Canadian federal election: Thornhill
Party	Candidate	Votes	%	±%	Expenditures
Conservative	Peter Kent	36,629	61.38	+12.37	
Liberal	Karen Mock	14,125	23.67	-15.76	
New Democratic	Simon Strelchik	7,141	11.97	+5.35	
Green	Norbert Koehl	1,562	2.62	-2.32	
Animal Alliance	Liz White	215	0.36	–	
Total valid votes/Expense limit		59,672	100.00		
Total rejected ballots		275	0.46	–	
Turnout		59,947	60.98	–	
Eligible voters		98,312	–	–	
Conservative hold		Swing		+14.07	

2008 Canadian federal election: Thornhill
Party	Candidate	Votes	%	±%	Expenditures
Conservative	Peter Kent	26,660	49.01	+15.30	$91,400
Liberal	Susan Kadis	21,448	39.43	-13.67	$62,484
New Democratic	Simon Strelchik	3,601	6.62	-1.19	$4,835
Green	Norbert Koehl	2,686	4.94	+1.51	$7,314
Total valid votes/Expense limit		54,395	100.00	$95,547	
Conservative gain from Liberal		Swing		+14.49	

2006 Canadian federal election: St. Paul's
Party	Candidate	Votes	%	±%
Liberal	Carolyn Bennett	29,295	50.3	-8.1
Conservative	Peter Kent	15,021	25.8	+5.4
New Democratic	Paul Summerville	11,189	19.2	+3.5
Green	Kevin Farmer	2,785	4.8	-0.7
Total valid votes		58,290	100.0	
Liberal hold		Swing		-6.75

28th Canadian Ministry (2006–2015) – Cabinet of Stephen Harper
Cabinet post (1)
Predecessor	Office	Successor
John Baird	Minister of the Environment; 2011–2013	Leona Aglukkaq

Media offices
Preceded by Lloyd Robertson	Anchor of The National; 1976–1978	Succeeded by Knowlton Nash
