= Melissa Lantsman =

Canadian politician (born 1984)

Melissa Lantsman MP
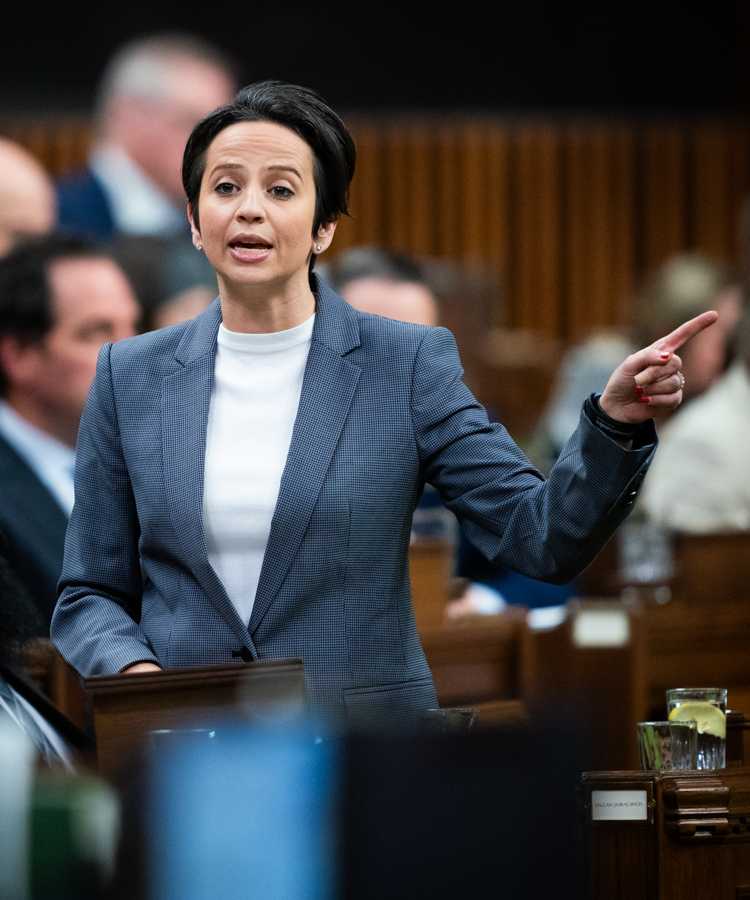
- Lantsman in the House of Commons, 2024

Deputy Leader of the Opposition
- Incumbent
- Assumed office September 13, 2022 Serving with Tim Uppal
- Leader: Pierre Poilievre; Andrew Scheer; Pierre Poilievre
- Preceded by: Luc Berthold

Deputy Leader of the Conservative Party
- Incumbent
- Assumed office September 13, 2022 Serving with Tim Uppal
- President: Robert Batherson; Stephen Barber
- Leader: Pierre Poilievre
- Preceded by: Luc Berthold

Shadow Minister of Transport
- In office November 9, 2021 – October 12, 2022
- Leader: Erin O'Toole; Candice Bergen; Pierre Poilievre
- Preceded by: Stephanie Kusie
- Succeeded by: Mark Strahl

Member of Parliament for Thornhill
- Incumbent
- Assumed office September 20, 2021
- Preceded by: Peter Kent

Personal details
- Born: April 8, 1984 (age 42) Toronto, Ontario, Canada
- Party: Conservative (federal); Progressive Conservative (provincial)
- Spouse: Lauren Rakowski (m. 2017)
- Children: 1
- Education: University of Toronto (BA); University of Ottawa
- Occupation: Politician, public relations executive, political strategist

Melissa Lantsman MP (born April 8, 1984) is a Canadian politician and former public relations executive who has served as the member of Parliament (MP) for Thornhill since 2021. A member of the Conservative Party, she is the party's co-deputy leader and the co-deputy leader of the Official Opposition, serving with Tim Uppal. Lantsman is the first openly lesbian and first Jewish woman ever elected as a Conservative MP. Upon Pierre Poilievre's election as Conservative Leader, he named Lantsman one of two deputy leaders along with Uppal.

Lantsman previously worked as a communications advisor to several cabinet members in the 28th Canadian Ministry of Prime Minister Stephen Harper. She was a senior advisor to the Progressive Conservative (PC) Party of Ontario and its chief spokesperson during the 2018 Ontario provincial election. Lantsman was previously the national vice president of Public Affairs at Enterprise Canada, a strategic communications firm.

In 2020, upon Peter Kent's retirement from Parliament, Lantsman announced her intention to seek the federal Conservative nomination in Thornhill. She defeated the incumbent PC member of Provincial Parliament (MPP), Gila Martow, to become the riding's CPC candidate on March 17, 2021. Lantsman was elected to Parliament on September 20, 2021, and sworn into office on October 28. Since November of that year, she served as the Opposition critic for transport in the Opposition Shadow Cabinet of Erin O'Toole. Lantsman was elected the vice-chair of the Parliamentary Standing Committee on Transport and Infrastructure. Currently, Lantsman sits on the Special Committee on the Canada–People’s Republic of China Relationship.

== Early life and education ==
Lantsman was born in Toronto in 1984 to a Ukrainian Jewish family and raised in Thornhill. She is the daughter of Ora and Michael Lantsman, who was from Odessa; her parents moved to Canada in 1975. Her mother was an accountant and her father was an uncredentialed engineer who worked in the taxi business and ran several pawn shops. She attended a French immersion program at Langstaff Secondary School in York Region and speaks fluent French in addition to English and Russian. Lantsman has one brother.

She attended University of Toronto and graduated with an Honours Bachelor of Arts. She later pursued graduate studies at the University of Ottawa and Rotman School of Management.

== Career ==
As an adolescent, Lantsman volunteered for Conservative Party candidates in local elections. During the 2008 Canadian federal election, she was appointed a senior communications advisor, with the party forming a minority government. Thereafter, she was appointed director of communications for the Ministry of Foreign Affairs under Ministers Lawrence Cannon and John Baird, serving from 2008 to 2011.

After a brief stint at The Coca-Cola Company as a senior public affairs advisor, Lantsman returned to government as director of communications for Minister of Finance Joe Oliver. Following the Harper government's loss in the 2015 Canadian federal election, Lantsman returned to the private sector as a senior director for CIBC Capital Markets.

In 2018, Lantsman served as director of communications for Ontario MPP Caroline Mulroney's candidacy for leadership of the Ontario PC Party. After Mulroney's loss, Lantsman joined the PC's campaign for the 2018 Ontario general election as its chief spokesperson and war room director. In this role, she oversaw all press communications and social media releases by the campaign. The election resulted in a PC majority government, the first since 1999, after 15 years of Liberal government in Ontario. After the election, Lantsman joined Hill+Knowlton Strategies, an international public relations strategy firm, at its Toronto office. In 2020, she joined Enterprise Canada, a strategic public relations consultancy, as its vice president for National Public Affairs. She relinquished her partnership in Enterprise in 2021 to focus on her political candidacy. According to public disclosure records, Lantsman is a director of a Toronto-based Venture Fund focused on investing in early-stage companies that prioritizes women founders.

Since 2019, Lantsman has appeared on the CBC News' Power & Politics as well as CTV's Power Play as a political panellist; she has also hosted a radio show on CFRB 1010 AM. She has sat on the board of the Canadian Jewish Political Affairs Committee, the Hot Docs Canadian International Documentary Festival, Jewish Addiction Community Services (JACS) and the Michael Garron Hospital in Toronto.

=== Political activism and candidacy ===
After the 2019 Canadian federal election, Lantsman and fellow Conservative strategist Jamie Ellerton published an opinion piece in The Globe and Mail, criticizing then-leader Andrew Scheer's approach to LGBTQ rights. Lantsman and Ellerton advocated that if the party wants to win, they needed to be more inclusive towards the LGBTQ community.

In 2020, Thornhill Conservative MP Peter Kent announced that he would not seek re-election at the next year's federal election. Kent had represented the electoral district since 2008. The riding has Canada's highest proportion of Jewish residents, at 37 per cent.

Lantsman announced her candidacy for the Conservative nomination on November 27, 2020. She was endorsed by former Prime Minister Stephen Harper, Alberta Premier Jason Kenney, former federal ministers John Baird, Joe Oliver, Pierre Poilievre, Rona Ambrose, Michelle Rempel Garner and Lisa Raitt, and incumbent Ontario provincial ministers Caroline Mulroney, Stephen Lecce, Greg Rickford and Paul Calandra. She was also endorsed by federal and provincial Conservative legislators, including Eric Duncan, Scott Aitchison, Logan Kanapathi, Stan Cho, Roman Baber and Vijay Thanigasalam.

Lantsman faced the incumbent MPP for Thornhill, Gila Martow, in the nomination contest. She participated in a series of nomination debates with Martow between December 2020 and March 2021. On April 3, 2021, Lantsman defeated Martow in the nomination election and was certified as the Conservative candidate for Thornhill. She faced Liberal candidate Gary Gladstone in the 2021 Canadian federal election on September 20 and, per preliminary results, won the seat with 51.3 per cent of the vote.

=== 44th Parliament (2021–2025) ===
Lantsman was sworn into the 44th Canadian Parliament on October 26, 2021. On November 9, she was appointed by Erin O'Toole to serve as the Shadow Minister of Transport.

After the House of Commons unanimously adopted a motion to ban conversion therapy, Lantsman tweeted that "Some days are exceptionally good days".

On February 16, 2022, in response to a question raised by Lantsman regarding the usage of the Emergencies Act, Prime Minister Justin Trudeau replied, "Conservative Party members can stand with people who wave swastikas." Lantsman responded, "I am a strong Jewish woman and a member of this House and the descendant of Holocaust survivors. I have never been made to feel less except for today when the Prime Minister accused me of standing with swastikas. I think he owes me an apology. I'd like an apology." Trudeau did not respond to Lantsman's request.

On February 27, Candice Bergen appointed Lantsman to serve in the Conservative Party leadership team as Chair of Outreach in addition to her role as Shadow Minister of Transport.

After the September 2022 Conservative Party of Canada leadership election, new Opposition Leader Pierre Poilievre named Lantsman co-deputy leader along with Alberta MP Tim Uppal.

In January 2023, Lantsman called for an emergency debate in Parliament on the rise in violence in the Toronto area, on the transit system, and across Canada.

In May 2023, Lantsman advocated that Canada should isolate Uganda after they passed anti-LGBTQ laws. She also attended the raising of the pride flag on Parliament Hill. During the Conservative Party policy convention, Lantsman defended the delegates' ability to bring anti-transgender resolution up for debate by arguing that it is a grassroot party and it was not the main priorities of the party.

Melissa Lantsman is considered pro-Israel. In March 2024, NDP MP Heather McPherson proposed a motion that Canada recognize the State of Palestine; Lantsman opposed the motion. Lantsman called for Canada to suspend funding to UNRWA. In response, protesters put posters on her office reading "Blood on your hands". Lantsman also said UNRWA was "an agency whose members actively participated on October 7, 2023".

Lantsman has advocated for "more approvals and less government gatekeepers" in housing construction as a solution to the Canadian housing crisis. Lantsman has also advocated for tying federal government funding to municipalities' housing unit approval rates.

After Poilievre made comments that transgender women should not be permitted access to women’s bathrooms in 2024, Lantsman defended his comments to The Hill Times by stating they were "common sense" and were supported by the caucus.

=== 45th Parliament (2025–present) ===
Lantsman was re-elected in the 2025 federal election, winning the most raw votes and the highest share of the vote in the Thornhill riding's history with 66.4%.

In July 2025, Lantsman officially authorized House of Commons petition E-6625 which calls for more government action against antisemitism. This was the first petition in the session dealing with antisemitism.

== Personal life ==
Lantsman is a lesbian. She and her wife, Lauren, were married in 2017. She lives with a severe form of Crohn's disease. She speaks English, French and Russian and is a fan of the Toronto Blue Jays.

== Electoral history ==
2025 Canadian federal election: Thornhill
Party	Candidate	Votes	%	±%	Expenditures
Conservative	Melissa Lantsman	44,419	66.40	+14.68	
Liberal	Liane Kotler	20,873	31.20	–4.86	
New Democratic	William McCarty	833	1.24	–4.73	
People's	Amir Hart	440	0.73	–3.87	
Green	Dominic Piotrowski	353	0.50	–1.14	
Total valid votes/expense limit		66,918			
Total rejected ballots		663			
Turnout		67,581	68.94		
Eligible voters		97,300			
Conservative notional hold		Swing		+9.61	
Source: Elections Canada

2021 Canadian federal election: Thornhill
Party	Candidate	Votes	%	±%	Expenditures
Conservative	Melissa Lantsman	25,687	51.3%	-3.26%	$105,101.06
Liberal	Gary Gladstone	18,168	36.3%	+0.88%	$92,712.82
New Democratic	Raz Razvi	3,041	6.1%	-0.38%	$4,940.19
People's	Samuel Greenfield	2,322	4.6%	–	$9,751.81
Green	Daniella Mikanovsky	844	1.7%	-1.29%	$0.00
Total valid votes/expense limit		50,062	99.2	0.28	$114,997.02
Total rejected ballots		390	0.77	-0.31	
Turnout		50,452	58.8	-4.82	
Eligible voters		85,739	76.06%	0.66%	
Conservative hold		Swing		-4.14	
Source: Elections Canada
