= The Weaker(?) Sex =

- Genre: Talk show
- Directed by: David Ruskin
- Presented by: Pamela Mason and Lorraine Thomson
- Country of origin: Canada
- Original language: English
- No. of seasons: 1

Production
- Executive producer: Don Brown
- Producers: Steven Krantz (1968); Bernard Cowan (1969); Sig Gerber (1969)
- Production company: Krantz Films

Original release
- Network: CBC Television
- Release: 30 September 1968 – 31 March 1969

The Weaker(?) Sex is a Canadian talk show that aired on CBC Television from 1968 to 1969.

== Premise ==
British presenter Pamela Mason hosted the initial 13-week run of this program in which she interviewed male guests with one exception (Judy LaMarsh). She was sometimes accompanied by Jim Fleming, a broadcaster who later became a federal cabinet minister. These episodes were coproductions between the CBC in Toronto and Krantz Films in New York. The program was broadcast on CBC in Canada and syndicated to American stations.

For the following three months, episodes were entirely produced by the CBC. Lorraine Thomson replaced Mason as host and interview subjects included more women. The first episode under this mid-season modification featured the topic "Why Women Dislike Men" with guests Barbara Hamilton and her sister Mary McInnis.

== Scheduling ==
This half-hour program was broadcast on weekdays at 4:00 p.m. (Eastern) from 30 September to 30 December 1968, then weekdays at 2:00 p.m. from 6 January to 31 March 1969.
