= Harry Freedman (author) =

British author

Harry Freedman is a British author who writes books on history, religion and culture and a weekly history article on Substack. His forthcoming book is the Rothschilds, The Untold Family Story.

== Education and early career ==
Born at the Bearsted Memorial Hospital in Stoke Newington in 1950, he grew up in St Johns Wood. In 1961 he was awarded an LCC scholarship to the City of London School, where he said he distinguished himself by being the first person in the school's 500-year history to be expelled from the, then compulsory, Combined Cadet Force. He studied Philosophy and Psychology at Exeter University and in 1971 opened the City Ditch, the West Country's first wholefood and vegetarian restaurant. In 1974 the City Ditch's food stall at the Windsor Free Festival came under attack from Thames Valley Police when, under instructions to break up the festival, they ‘invaded’ the site and evicted the festival-goers.

Subsequently, he developed an entrepreneurial career in property development and medical technology. In 1993 he was awarded an MA in Jewish Studies by Jews' College and in 1998 obtained a PhD from University College London on the Aramaic translation of the Torah known as Pseudo-Jonathan.

In 1994 was appointed Chief Executive of the Assembly of Masorti Synagogues. He left the post in 2001, after the death of Rabbi Dr Louis Jacobs, and the movement's subsequent change of direction. He subsequently criticised the movement for lacking cohesion, adducing both its intellectual foundations and 'expansionist ambitions', to argue that it was 'difficult, if not impossible, to retain both academic integrity and popular spiritual appeal'. In 2012 he established a careers consultancy, Career Energy, which he exited in 2010.

== Authorial career ==
Described by the publisher, Bloomsbury, as Britain's leading author of popular works of Jewish culture and history, his first book for them, in 2014, was The Talmud: A Biography. In the book, he asserts that the Talmud is a classic of world literature and that its story is an account of one of the most important cultural, historical, and religious works of our time. Subsequent books included The Murderous History of Bible Translations, Kabbalah: Secrecy, Scandal and the Soul, and Britain’s Jews. Reason To Believe: The Controversial Life of Rabbi Louis Jacobs, was a biography of the English Jewish rabbi and theologian whose views on revelation led him into conflict with the Orthodox rabbinate in the 1950s and 1960s.

Shylock’s Venice a narrative non-fiction study of the Jewish ghetto in Venice was published in 2024. Noel Malcom of the Daily Telegraph commented "one can see here some of the reasons for his success: a good eye for detail, an easy, fluent style, and the ability to distil complex issues without dumbing down."

In 2021 Bloomsbury published Leonard Cohen: The Mystical Roots of Genius, which discusses the spiritual and mystical sources that Leonard Cohen drew upon in his music. David Kirby, for The Washington Post, described it as "brimming with insight.... peppered with many valuable observations". Freedman followed in the genre in 2024 with Bob Dylan: Jewish Roots American Soil.

== Current Writing ==
His forthcoming book, The Rothschilds, The Untold Family Story, to be published by Hanover Square Press in December 2026, is a history of the Rothschild family, from their origins in the Frankfurt ghetto until today.

Freedman writes a weekly article on Jewish history on Substack. He speaks regularly at literary festivals and events including Jewish Book Week in London, and for the Jewish Book Council and the 92nd Street Y in New York. He lives in London.

== Works ==
- The Rothschilds: The Untold Family Story (2026 ISBN 978-1-335-00097-2)
- Bob Dylan: Jewish Roots, American Soil (2025 ISBN 978-1-3994-1627-6)
- Shylock's Venice: The Remarkable History of Venice's Jews and the Ghetto (2024, ISBN 978-1-3994-0727-4)
- Britain's Jews: Confidence, Maturity, Anxiety (2022, ISBN 978-1-4729-8721-1)
- Leonard Cohen: The Mystical Roots of Genius (2021, ISBN 978-1-4729-8730-3)
- Reason To Believe: The Controversial Life of Rabbi Louis Jacobs (2020, ISBN 978-1-4729-7938-4)
- Kabbalah: Secrecy, Scandal and the Soul (2019, ISBN 978-1-4729-5098-7)
- The Murderous History of Bible Translations (2016, ISBN 978-1-4729-2167-3)
- The Talmud: A Biography (2014, ISBN 978-1-4729-0594-9)
- Jerusalem Imperilled (2011, ISBN 978-1-4658-3372-3)
- The Gospels' Veiled Agenda (2009, ISBN 978-1-84694-260-0)
- How to Get a Job in a Recession (2009, ISBN 978-1-906821-09-8)
