= 55 North Maple =

Canadian television series

- Created by: Elsa Franklin
- Starring: Max Ferguson; Joan Drewery
- Country of origin: Canada
- Original language: English
- No. of seasons: 1

Production
- Executive producer: John Ross
- Producer: Elsa Franklin
- Running time: 30 minutes

Original release
- Network: CBC Television
- Release: 7 September 1970 – 15 September 1971

55 North Maple is a Canadian afternoon television series that aired on CBC Television during the 1970-1971 television season. The programme was a fusion of talk show, how-to and situation comedy.

== Premise ==
A magazine author (Max Ferguson) lives in a house at 55 North Maple with his sister (Joan Drewery) and her husband who was not cast but whose presence is implied. This premise provides a pretext to host various guests to demonstrate food preparation, redecoration or other how-to topics. In one episode, Ferguson described how to make carrot whiskey for guest Harry Freedman, while Drewery hosted other guests to illustrate interior decoration and fashion. A CBC statement described the production as "an information show in semi-dramatic form."

== Production ==
55 North Maple was produced by Elsa Franklin in Toronto at the studios of Robert Lawrence Productions. John Ross was the programme's executive producer who allowed Ferguson "full scope for his inventive genius" and intended that the episodes would be unscripted. This marked a rare television production for Ferguson.

The 1973 Canadian series The Real Magees was a subsequent attempt to produce another talk show which was structured around storyline elements.

== Scheduling ==
The half-hour programme aired weekday afternoons at 1:30 p.m. (Eastern).
