= Krantz Films =

Defunct Canadian animation studio and production company

Krantz Films, Inc. (KFI) was a Canadian animation studio and production company headed by American film producer Steve Krantz. From 1966 to 1974, it produced animated cartoon shows such as The Marvel Super Heroes, Rocket Robin Hood, Spider-Man, The Wonderful Stories of Professor Kitzel, and Max, the 2000-Year-Old Mouse.

It also produced the films Fritz the Cat, Heavy Traffic, The Nine Lives of Fritz the Cat and Cooley High, and many live-action television shows in Canada and Japan: The Space Giants in 1970, The Weaker(?) Sex in 1968 and many more. During production of the latter, the company was sold to cable system operator Vikoa, which later wound down the operation.

- The Marvel Super Heroes (1966) – Co-production with Grantray-Lawrence Animation
- Rocket Robin Hood (1966) – Co-production with Trillium Studios
- Max, the 2000-Year-Old Mouse (1967) – Co-production with Grantray-Lawrence Animation
- Spider-Man (1967–1970) – Co-production with Grantray-Lawrence Animation)
- Strange Paradise (1969–1970)
- The Space Giants (1970–1973) – Co-production with P Productions
