= Rodak =

Rodak or Rodák is a name. Notable people with the name include:

- Leo Rodak (1913–1991), American featherweight boxer
- Marek Rodák (born 1996), Slovak football player
- Mike Rodak (1917–1980), American football player
- Rodak, mother of Ardashir I of Persia
