= Images of Canada =

- Genre: Historical documentary
- Country of origin: Canada
- Original language: English
- No. of seasons: 4
- No. of episodes: 10

Production
- Executive producer: Vincent Tovell
- Running time: 60 minutes

Original release
- Network: CBC Television
- Release: 21 March 1972 – 27 October 1976

Images of Canada is a Canadian documentary television miniseries that aired on CBC Television occasionally from 1972 to 1976.

== Premise ==
This series examines various aspects of Canadian history.

== Episodes ==
=== 1972-73 ===
- 21 March 1972: "The Craft of History" (George Robertson producer) - host Ramsay Cook discussed aspects of Canadian history with Michel Brunet, Donald Creighton and Arthur R. M. Lower
- 28 March 1972: "The Folly on the Hill" (Vincent Tovell director) - featured Ottawa's Parliament Buildings, noting their history and design
- 21 February 1973: "Heroic Beginnings" (Donald Creighton narrator and director) - featured various historical locations such as Dawson City, Yukon and an Atlantic Viking community

=== "The Whitecomers" ===
Five of the episodes were grouped "The Whitecomers", three of which aired in 1973 and the remainder in 1974.

- 28 February 1973: "The Magic Circle" (Carol Myers director) - concerned New France between 1600 and 1867
- 7 March 1973: "Ties That Bind" (John Labow director) - concerned Atlantic Canada's history
- 14 March 1973: "Peace, Order, and Prosperity" (Carol Myers director) - featured the history of the Upper Canada region between 1776 and 1900
- 21 March 1973: rebroadcast of "The Follow on the Hill"
- 28 March 1973: rebroadcast of "The Craft of History"

=== 1974 ===
- 18 February 1974 - Donald Creighton reviews Canada's expansion
- 25 February 1974 - Portrait of New France 1600-1867
- 4 March 1974 - "Ties that Bind the Maritimes", Atlantic history from 1600 to 1867
- 11 March 1974 - "Upper Canada 1700-1900"
- 18 March 1974 - "The Promised Land", part of the Whitecomers sub-series, concerning the Prairies
- 25 March 1974 - "Spendour Undiminished", part of the Whitecomers sub-series, about British Columbia

=== 1976 ===
Two special episodes were broadcast in 1976:

- 6 April 1976 "Journey Without Arrival: A Personal Point of View From Northrop Frye" - the author and academic discusses Canadian identity and attitudes, discussing art and history in scenes recorded at various Canadian locations.
- 27 October 1976 "Spirit in a Landscape: The People Beyond" (Carol Myers director, Barbara Moon writer) - features Inuit art and culture. This episode was broadcast in three languages: English for CBC, French for Radio-Canada and Inuktitut for CBC's Northern Service.

== Scheduling ==
The first season of this hour-long series was broadcast on Tuesdays at 10:00 p.m. on 21 and 28 March 1972.

In 1973, the season consisted of four new episodes plus repeats of the two episodes from the first season, seen on Wednesdays at 9:30 p.m. from 21 February to 28 March 1973.

Images of Canada's third and final season aired Mondays at 10:00 p.m. from 18 February to 25 March 1974.

Episodes were rebroadcast on various Sundays during mid-1977 and mid-1979. Excerpts from the series were later seen in the Canadian School Telecasts broadcasts.
