= Harry Freeman (cricketer) =

Australian cricketer

Personal information
- Full name: Harry Septimus Freeman
- Born: 11 June 1860; Melbourne, Australia
- Died: 7 November 1933 (aged 73); Brunswick, Victoria, Australia

Domestic team information
- Years: Team
- 1887–1889: Victoria
- 1893–1895: Queensland
- Source: Cricinfo, 25 July 2015

Harry Septimus Freeman (11 June 1860 – 7 November 1933) was an Australian cricketer. He played four first-class cricket matches for Victoria between 1887 and 1889 and three for Queensland between 1893 and 1895.

== See also ==
- List of Victoria first-class cricketers
