= Grant Simmons (footballer) =

Australian rules footballer

Personal information
- Full name: Grant Simmons
- Born: 9 June 1952 (age 74)
- Original team: Sunshine
- Height: 193 cm (6 ft 4 in)
- Weight: 85 kg (187 lb)

Playing career^{1}
Years	Club	Games (Goals)
1970–71, 1973–76	Footscray	30 (1)
- ^{1} Playing statistics correct to the end of 1976.

Grant Simmons (born 9 June 1952) is a former Australian rules footballer who played with Footscray in the Victorian Football League (VFL).
