= Henry Freeman (lifeboatman) =

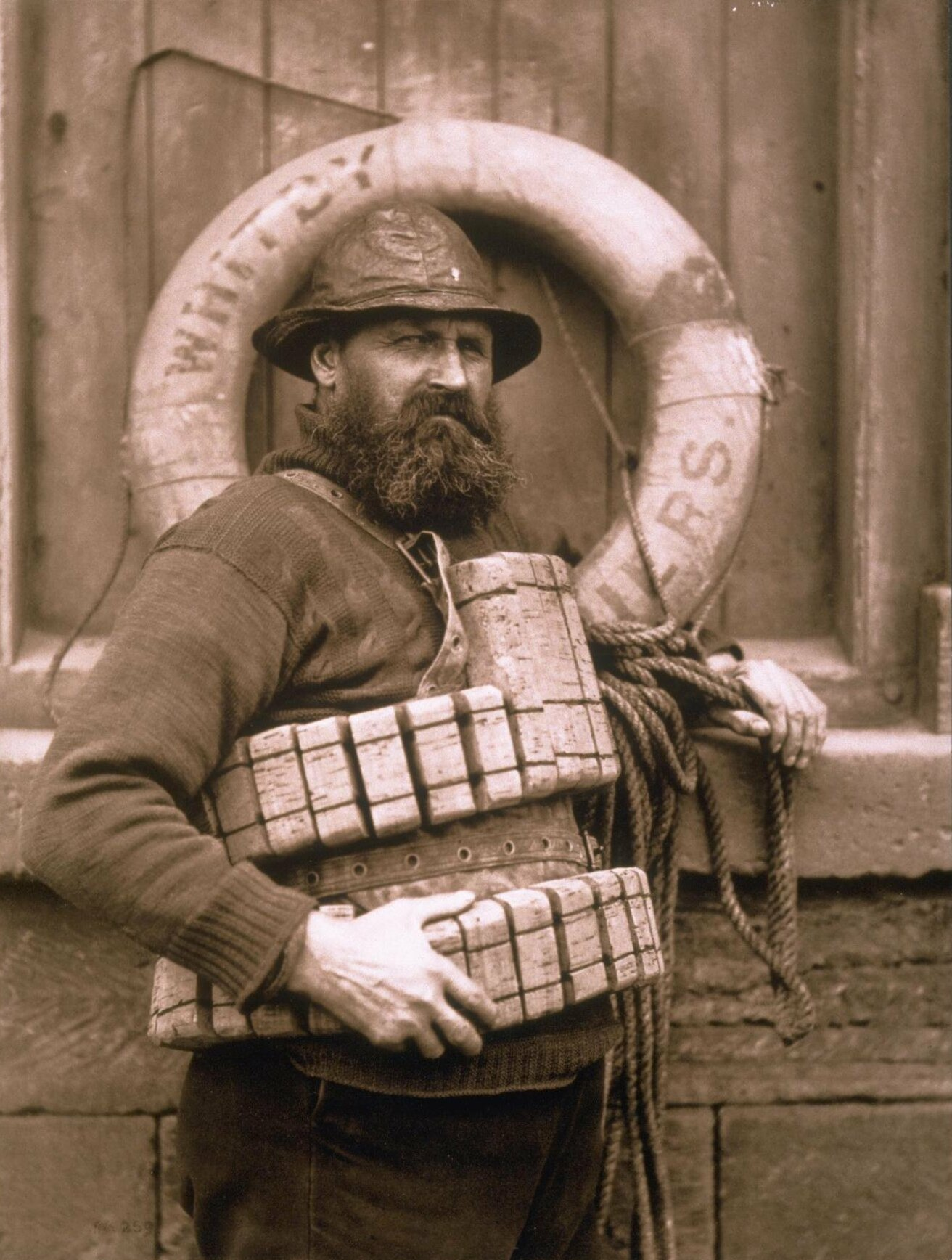
- Born: 29 April 1835; Bridlington
- Died: 13 December 1904 (aged 69)

Henry Freeman (29 April 1835 – 13 December 1904) was a Whitby fisherman and lifeboatman.

== Biography ==
Born in Bridlington, East Riding of Yorkshire, Freeman worked in his youth as a brickmaker. He was successful at his work, and rose to the position of manager. With the decline of the brick trade Freeman turned to the sea and fishing. He moved to Whitby, and became a fisherman and a lifeboatman.

Freeman was the only survivor of the Whitby Lifeboat disaster of 9 February 1861, during which a great storm wrecked more than 200 ships on the east coast. The Whitby lifeboat crew launched five times to rescue stricken vessels, but on their sixth launch, tragedy struck. A freak wave hit the lifeboat, which capsized, and all but one of the crew were lost. Freeman survived because he was wearing a new design of cork lifejacket. He was awarded an RNLI Silver Medal for the courage and determination he displayed that day, and later become the Whitby RNLI Coxswain.

Freeman was a lifeboatman for more than 40 years, 22 years as coxswain. He participated in many rescues, saved many lives, and became a respected ambassador for the lifeboat cause and a prominent spokesman for his fellow fishermen. In 1880, he was awarded a second RNLI Silver Medal.

== Personal life ==
Late in life Freeman married his deceased wife Elizabeth's widowed sister, Emma, an action that was illegal until the passage of the Deceased Wife's Sister's Marriage Act 1907.

== Death ==
Freeman died on 13 December 1904, aged 69.

== In popular culture ==
Freeman's story is retold in Storm Warrior : Turbulent Life of Henry Freeman (1991), by Ian Minter and Ray Shill.

In 2005, a solid bronze bust of Freeman, sculpted by Richard Sefton, was installed and unveiled at Lifeboat Museum in Pier Road, Whitby; it was transferred to an exterior wall on the new lifeboat station upon its completion in Spring 2007. The sculpture's display commemorates all those who have lost their lives at sea off Whitby.

In 2021, The Freeman 1st Foundation was created in honour of Henry Freeman. The grant-making charity provides financial and practical support to talented young people resident in Yorkshire and the Humber. The charity is located in Bridlington.

== See also ==
- Royal National Lifeboat Institution
