= Crocker Art Museum =

American art museum in Sacramento, California

- U.S. National Register of Historic Places
- California Historical Landmark No. 599
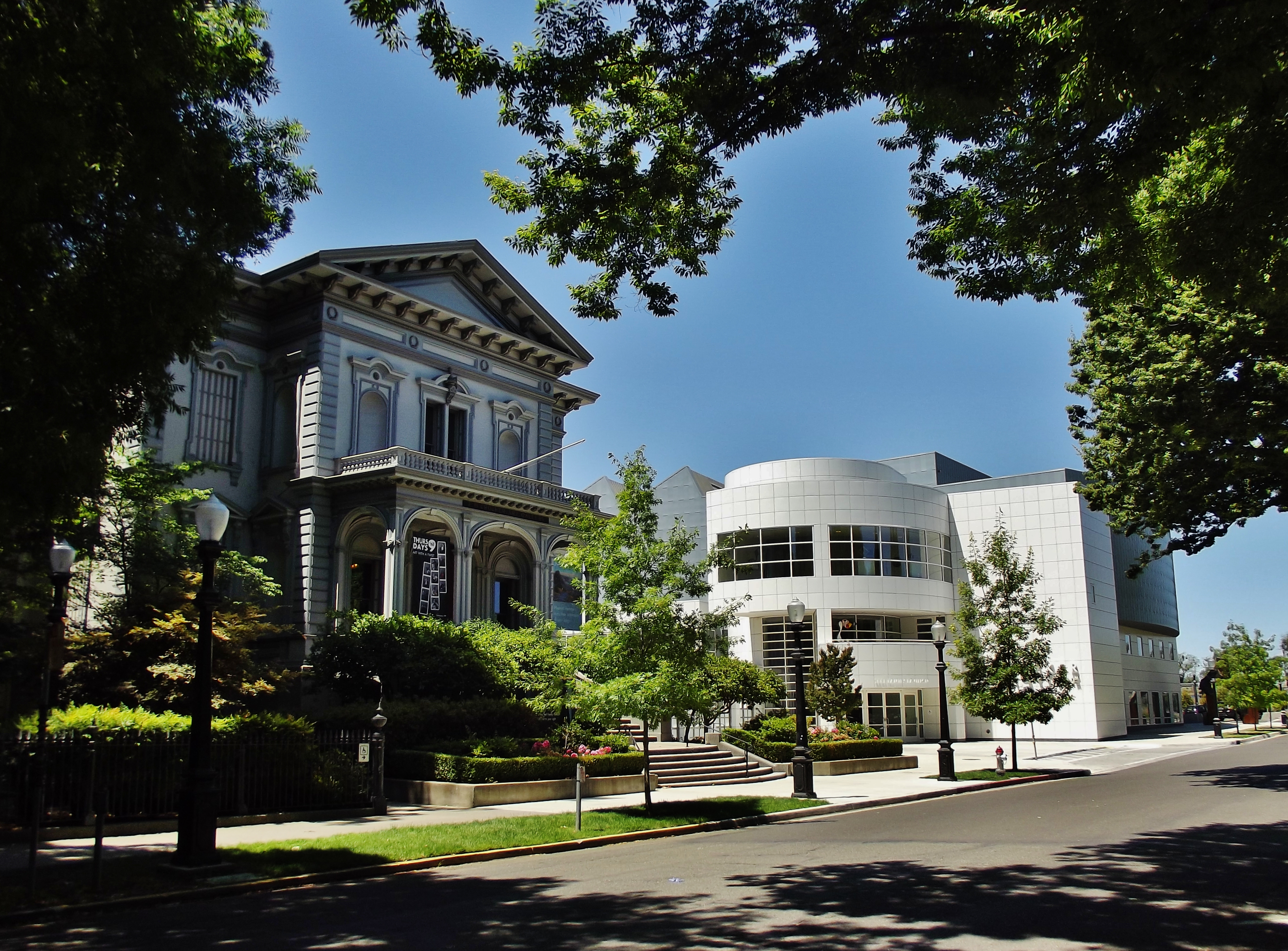
- Old and new buildings of the Crocker Art Museum
- Interactive fullscreen map
- Location: 216 O St., Sacramento, California
- Coordinates: 38°34′37″N 121°30′18″W
- Built: 1871; addition 2010
- Architect: Seth Babson (1871); Charles Gwathmey (2010)
- Architectural style: Italianate; Classic Contemporary
- NRHP reference No.: 71000176
- CHISL No.: 599
- Added to NRHP: May 6, 1971

The Crocker Art Museum is the oldest art museum in the Western United States, located in Sacramento, California. Founded in 1885, the museum holds one of the premier collections of Californian art. The collection includes American works dating from the Gold Rush to the present, European paintings and master drawings, one of the largest international ceramics collections in the U.S., and collections of Asian, African, and Oceanic art. The Crocker Art Museum is accredited by the American Alliance of Museums.

== History ==
Edwin B. Crocker (1818–1875), a wealthy California lawyer and judge, and his wife, Margaret Crocker (1822–1901), began to assemble a significant collection of paintings and drawings during an extended trip to Europe, from 1869 to 1871. Upon their return to Sacramento, they set about creating an art gallery in part of their grand home at the corner of Third and O streets. When the gallery was completed, it was opened to the public with proceeds funding the Sacramento Library. With 694 paintings, the gallery boasted the largest private collection in the country, and held more paintings than the Metropolitan Museum of Art. The gallery became of the hub of social activity in Sacramento, hosting benefits for local organizations and welcoming prominent visitors including the Hawaiian queen, Liliʻuokalani (1878), President Ulysses S. Grant (1879), and Oscar Wilde (1882).

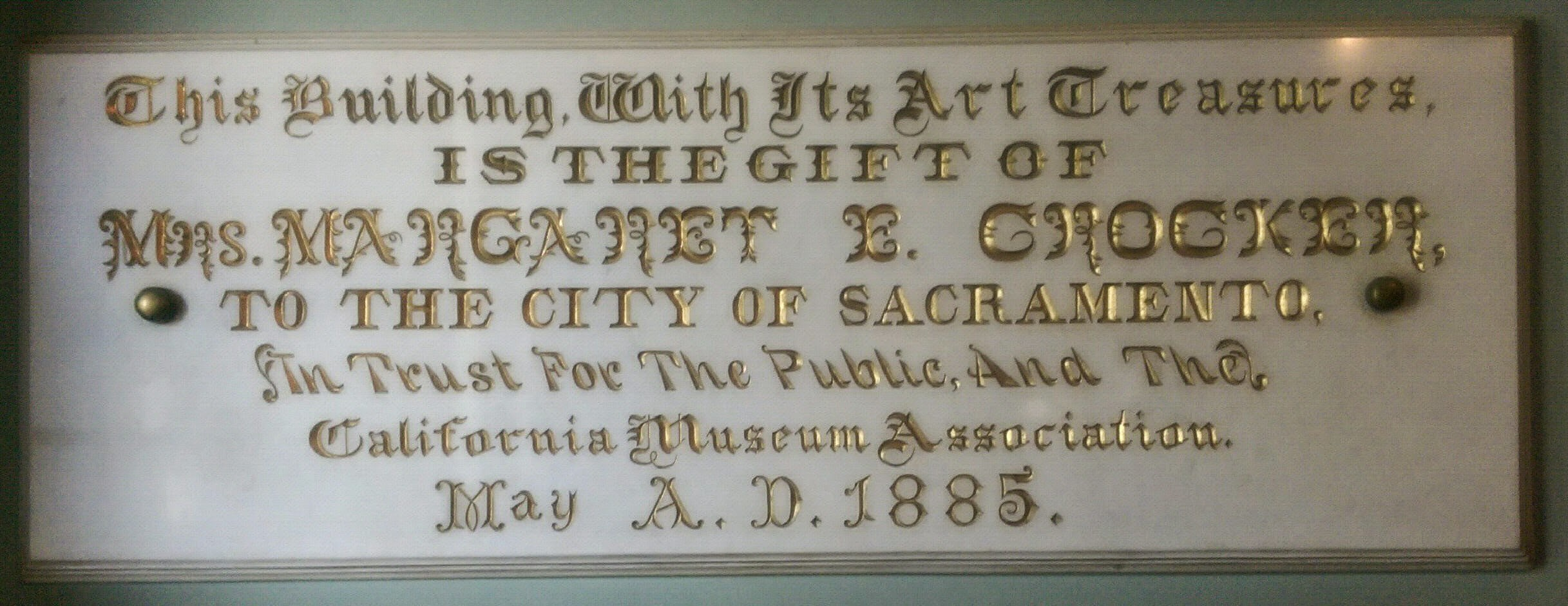
Marble commemorative plaque at the Crocker Art Museum

E. B. Crocker died in 1875. In 1885, his widow loaned the gallery to the California Museum Association (CMA) for Central California's first Art and Curio Loan Exhibition. This exhibition lasted two weeks and was a great success. The CMA's president, David Lubin, convinced Margaret (and E.B. Crocker's three daughters, who had equal rights to the gallery through Crocker's will) to donate the space to the museum association to ensure the long-term preservation of the gallery. Margaret Crocker was made a life director and presented the E. B. Crocker Art Gallery and collection to the City of Sacramento and the California Museum Association, "in trust for the public," the contents of which were valued at the time at more than $500,000. A school of art was established at the gallery in 1886.

In 1978, the Crocker Art Gallery was renamed the Crocker Art Museum. In 2002, to accommodate a burgeoning collection and the needs of the growing population of Sacramento and California's Central Valley region, the museum commissioned the firm of Gwathmey Siegel & Associates to design a major addition. The greatly expanded Crocker Art Museum opened on October 10, 2010.

== Permanent collections ==
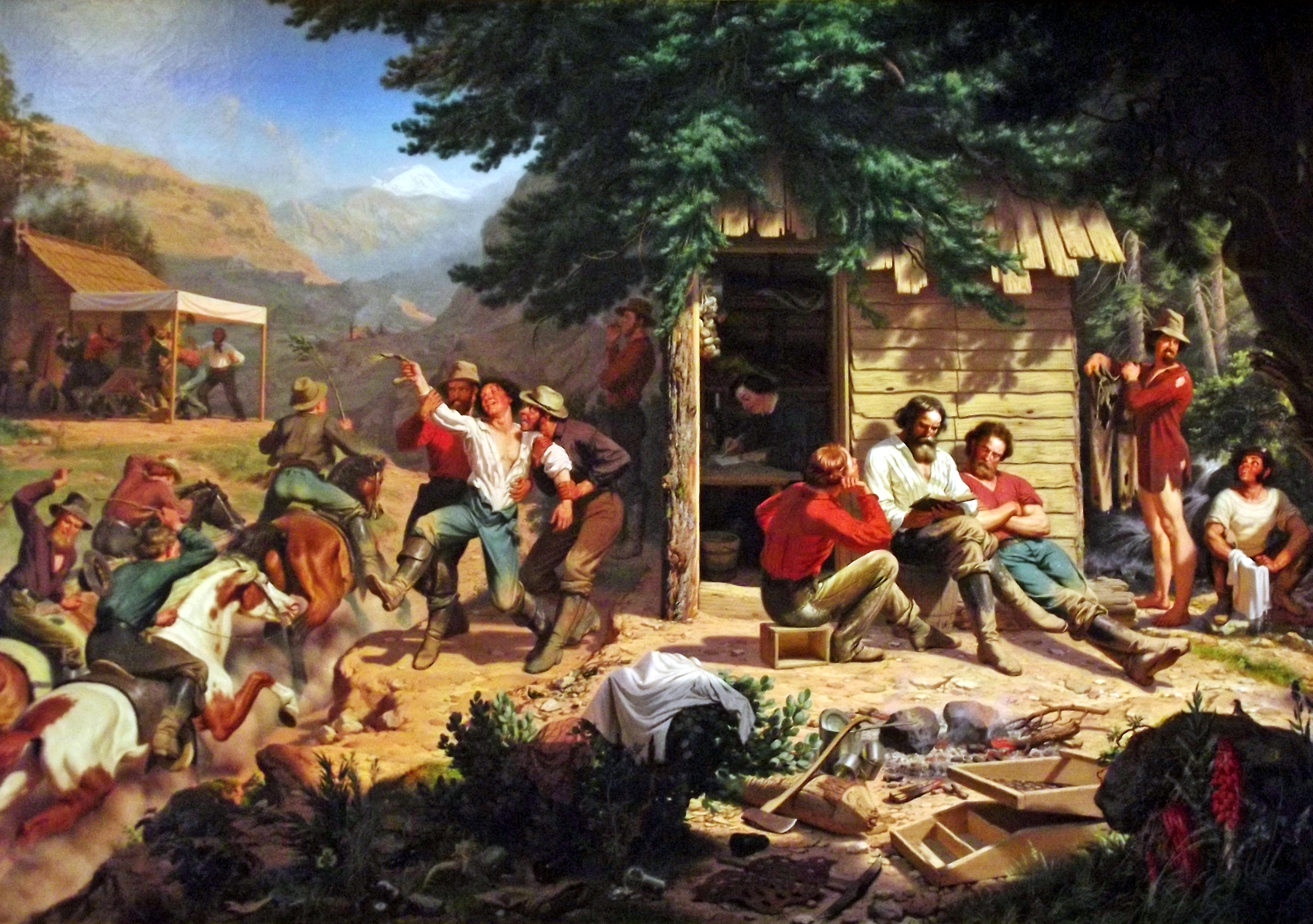
Charles Christian Nahl, Sunday Morning in the Mines

=== Californian art and American art ===
The Californian art collection includes works dating from statehood to the present. The core collection of early Californian art was assembled by Judge E. B. and Margaret Crocker in the early 1870s. Prominent in their collection are works by the German-American artist Charles Christian Nahl, who brought the large scale and copious detail of European history painting to works depicting the California Gold Rush. The Crockers commissioned five major works from Nahl, including Sunday Morning in the Mines (1872).

=== European art ===
==== Original collection ====
The collection of European art began with the Crocker family's trip to Europe, from 1869 to 1871. It was not a Grand Tour. The Crockers rented lodgings in Dresden for over a year, and traveled mostly in Germany. As a later director of the museum would write, "Mr. Crocker was a novice and completely susceptible to a kind of fraud in his anxiety to become the possessor of a large collection of masterpieces. He acquired in his wholesale search a collection of more than 700 paintings," most of them "not by the few famous names given him by the dealers in Munich and Dresden." (Works said to be by Rembrandt, Rubens, Poussin, Salvator Rosa, and even Leonardo da Vinci appear in the initial 1876 catalogue, but were reattributed in following decades.) However, among Crocker's purchases were a number of genuinely rare works by a broader array of artists than he realized, and for a brief time the Crockers possessed the largest private art collection in the United States.

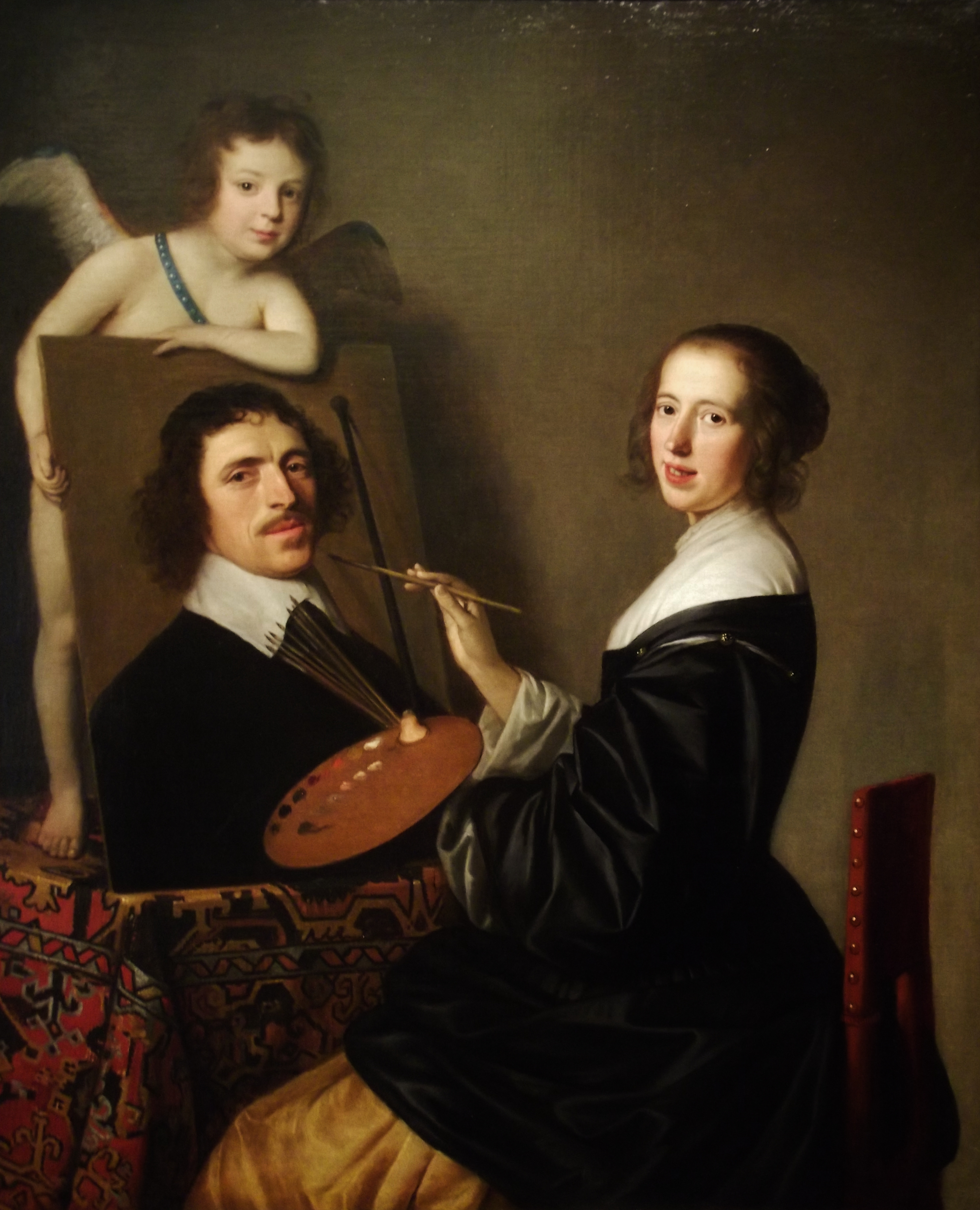
Gerrit van Honthorst's Allegory of Painting (1648)

Along with paintings, the Crockers also acquired 1344 Old Master drawings "and untold numbers of prints of rare craftsmanship." Systematic study of the origin and significance of these drawings began only in the 21st century.

Of more certain provenance were the numerous German and Central European paintings Crocker purchased, many by artists who were alive and working at the time. These 19th-century paintings would form the core of the European collection, along with a number of 17th-century Flemish and Dutch Golden Age still lifes and genre scenes, as well as French and Italian works of the 17th and 18th centuries. Artists represented in Crocker's original collection include Maarten van Heemskerck, Jan Brueghel the Elder, Klaes Molenaer, Pieter Quast, Antonio Joli, Francesco Solimena, Paolo de Matteis, Claude-Joseph Vernet, Jacques-Louis David, Andreas Achenbach, Maria van Oosterwyck, and Karl von Piloty. It was only in 1940 that some of these paintings resurfaced after having stayed 50 years virtually forgotten in the basement of the old Crocker Mansion in Sacramento.

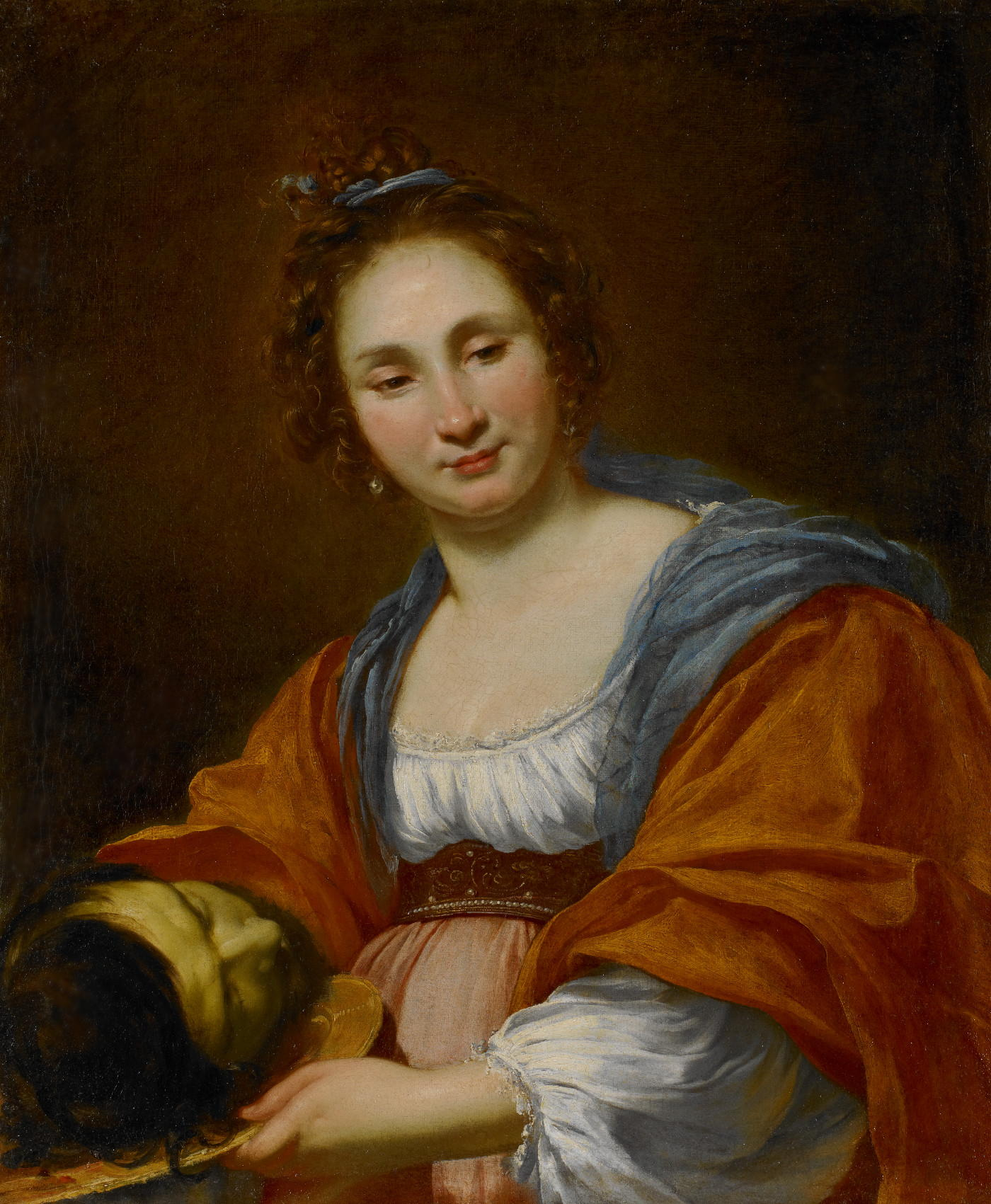
Salome (1626–1627) by Simon Vouet

==== Later acquisitions ====
Beginning in the 21st century, gifts by philanthropist Alan Templeton have expanded the scope of the European collection to include works by Italian artists Guercino, il Morazzone, Bernardo Strozzi, and Rosalba Carriera, the Swedish portrait painter Alexander Roslin, and French artists Simon Vouet, Philippe de Champaigne, Jean-Baptiste Perronneau, Charles Poërson, Pierre-Alexandre Wille, Louis-Jean-François Lagrenée, and Robert Lefèvre, as well as English portraitist Sir Thomas Lawrence, Austrian artists Josef Danhauser and Adolf Hirémy-Hirschl, German artist Heinrich Vogeler, and the Dutch artists Abraham Hondius and Jan van Bijlert.

Gifts and promised gifts by the Beekhuis family of 67 19th-century Dutch landscapes are presented in the Beekhuis Foundation Gallery, including works by Johannes Hermanus Koekkoek and his descendants, and various painters of the Hague School.

The Crocker's holdings of European art after 1900 are small, but include one of Northern California's most significant collections of works by Pierre-Auguste Renoir, in part due to gifts from the artist's grandson, Alain Renoir, a professor at the University of California, Berkeley. These include three small bronzes, two terra cotta relief sculptures, a Cagnes landscape painting, and works on paper, and also a ceramic vase by Jean Renoir. Works after 1900 also include two portraits of Crocker family members by Giovanni Boldini.

=== Works on paper ===
The collection of approximately 1,500 Old Master drawings include examples from the major European schools. Collection strengths include European drawings from the 17th and 18th centuries. Major drawings by artists such as Albrecht Dürer, Fra Bartolommeo, François Boucher, and Jean-Honoré Fragonard are represented. American photography and modern and contemporary California prints are also strengths of the works on paper collection.

== Museum buildings ==
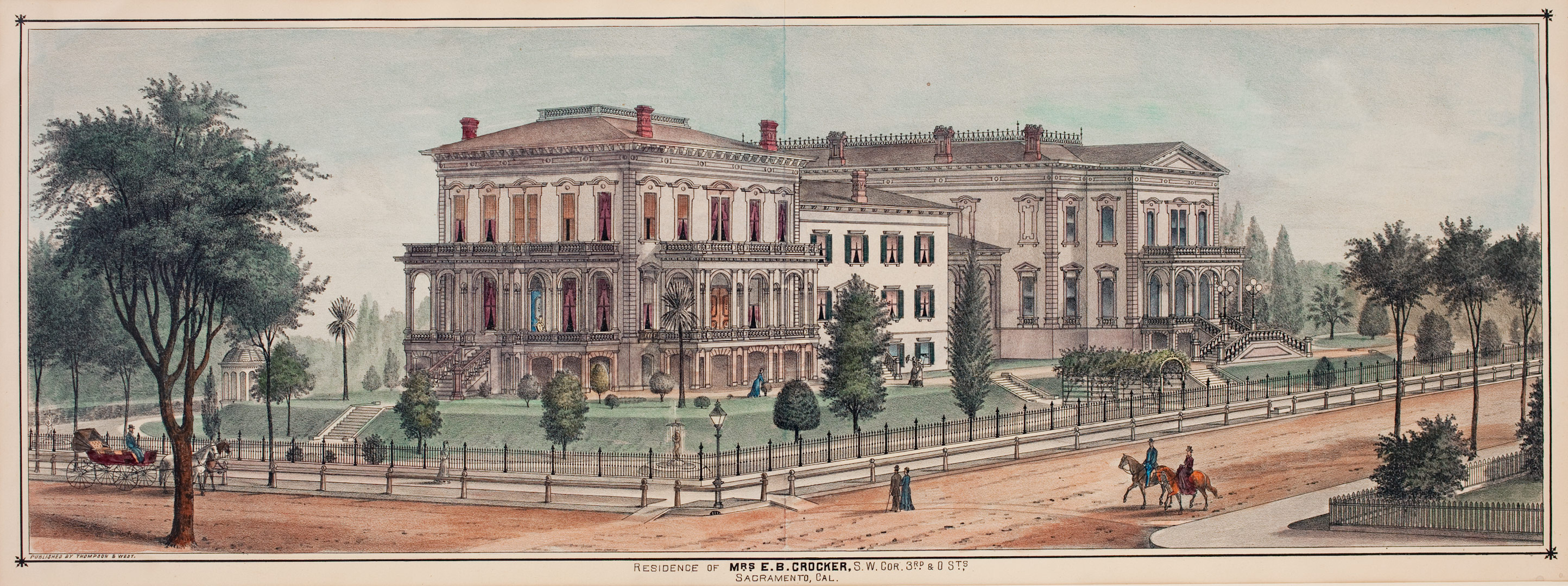
Vintage image of the residence of Mrs. E.B Crocker c. 1880, later to become the Crocker Art Museum. The building in the foreground was the family home; the structure to the right with its own entrance housed the art gallery. The entire complex is now part of the Crocker Art Museum.

=== Crocker family mansion and art gallery ===
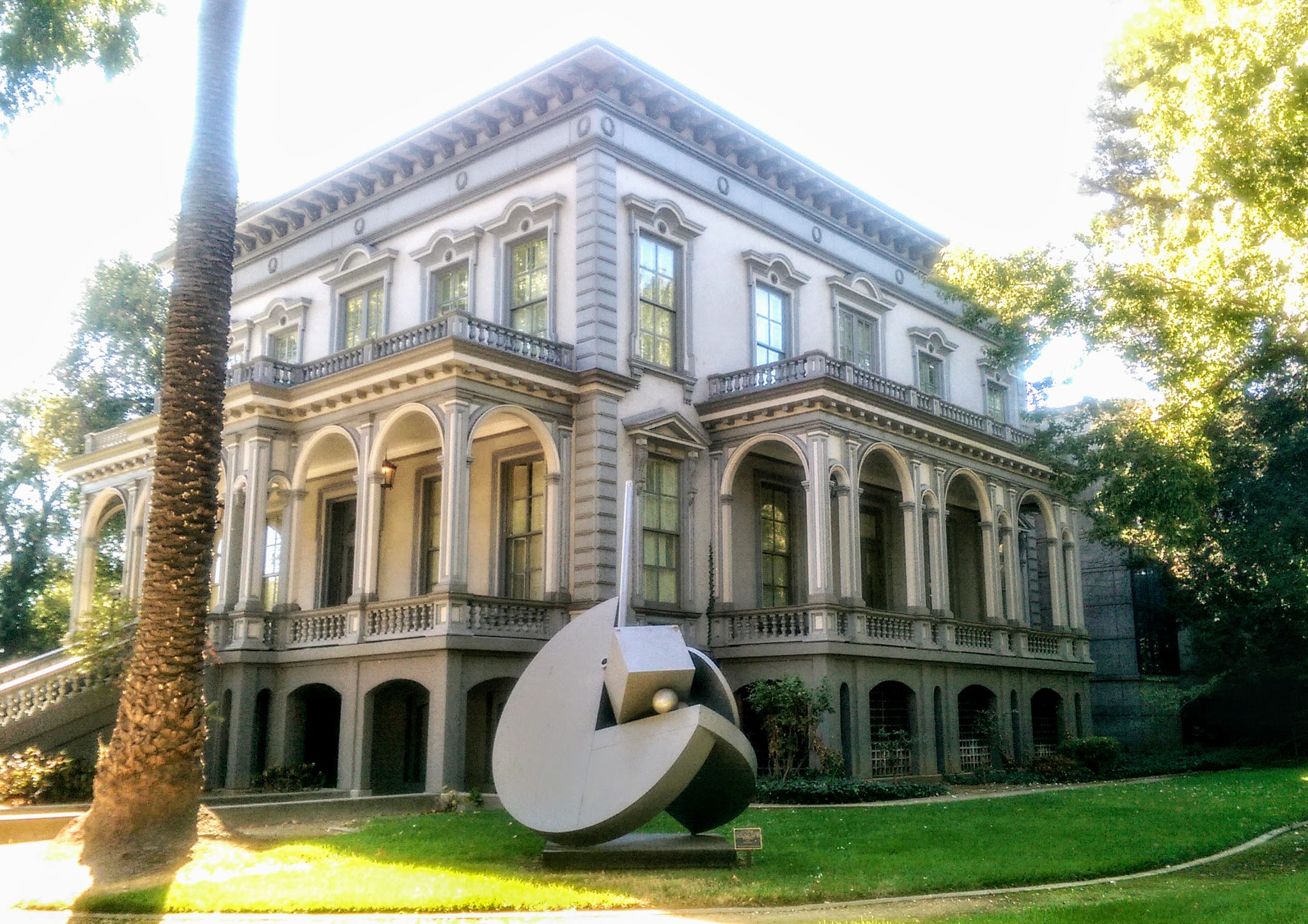
The Crocker family mansion, now part of the museum

In 1868, Judge Edwin B. Crocker purchased the property and existing building, built by B. F. Hastings in 1853, on the corner of Third and O Streets. In 1871 he commissioned Seth Babson (1830–1908), a local architect, to add a new building to the home to hold his growing art collection. (Babson had previously designed the home now known as the Leland Stanford Mansion in Sacramento.) Crocker asked Babson to design an elaborate gallery building in the Italianate style that would sit adjacent to the mansion and display the family's growing art collection.

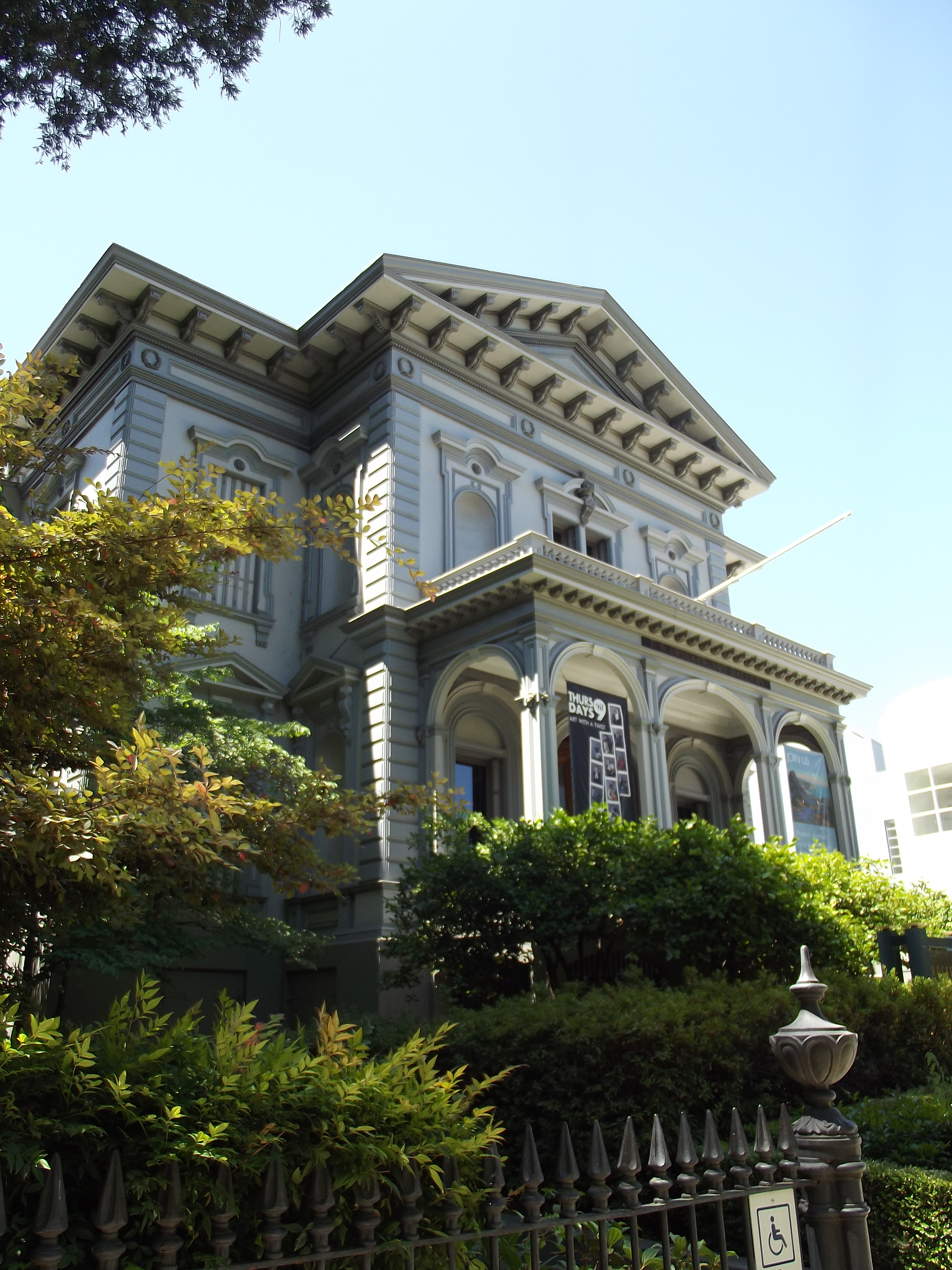
The historic Art Gallery building

Babson saw the home and gallery as an integrated complex, unique in design and demanding the finest materials. The gallery building included a bowling alley, skating rink and billiards room on the ground floor; a natural history museum and a library on the first floor; a 60 ft long ballroom, and a grand staircase. Public rooms were decorated with gold-leafed and frescoed panels, separated by long mirrors. Completed in 1874, the Crocker family mansion and art gallery are considered the masterpieces of Babson's career.

The family mansion went through several uses and reconstructions until a 1989 renovation restored the historic façade and created a modern gallery interior.

=== 2010 expansion ===
On October 10, 2010, the Crocker Art Museum opened a new 100,000-square-foot (9,300 m^{2}) building designed by Gwathmey Siegel & Associates Architects founded by Charles Gwathmey, known for having been a member of The New York Five, a group of like-minded architects. The custom facade system was designed and supplied by Overgaard Ltd., Hong Kong. The new building, named the Teel Family Pavilion, is attached to the museum's historic structures.

The expansion more than tripled the Crocker's size, from 45,000 to 145,000 square feet (4,200 to 13,500 m^{2}), adding four times the space for traveling exhibitions and three times the space for the Museum to showcase its permanent collection. The original museum accommodated only 4 percent of the museum's collection; 15 percent was displayed at the opening of the new section.

The expanded Museum includes a new education center with four studio art classrooms, an art education resource room for teachers and docents, an expanded library, and student and community exhibition galleries, as well as an auditorium and public gathering places.

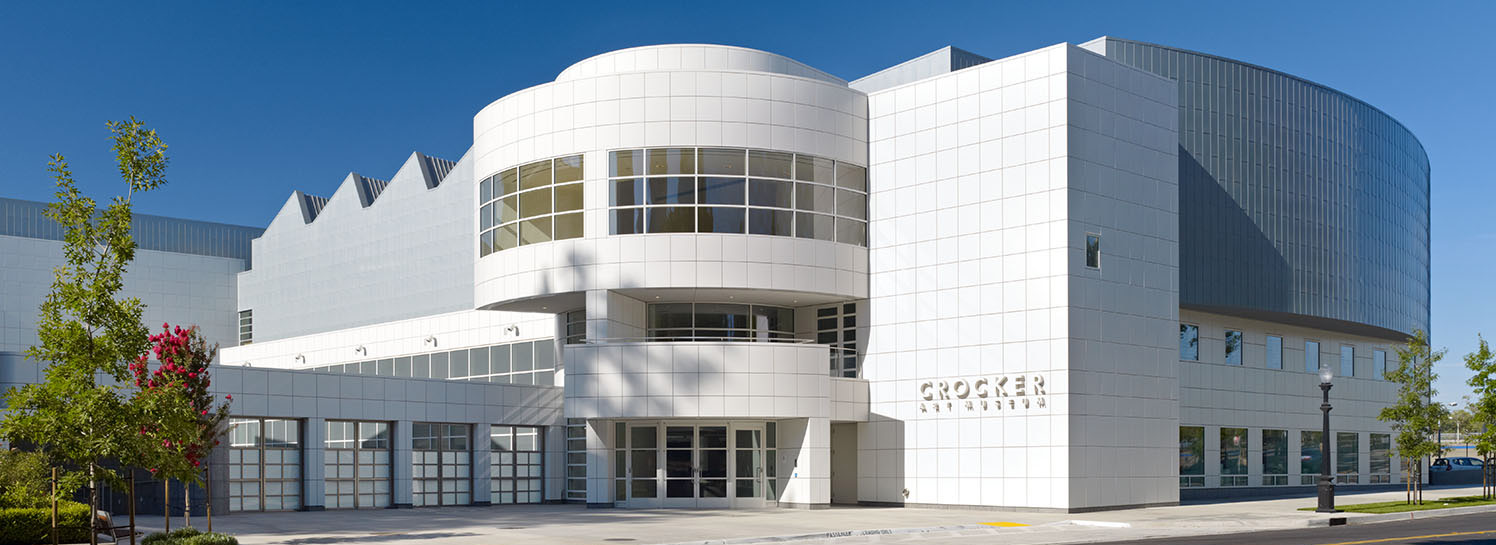
The Teel Family Pavilion, the new wing of the Crocker Art Museum

== Selected collection highlights (chronological) ==
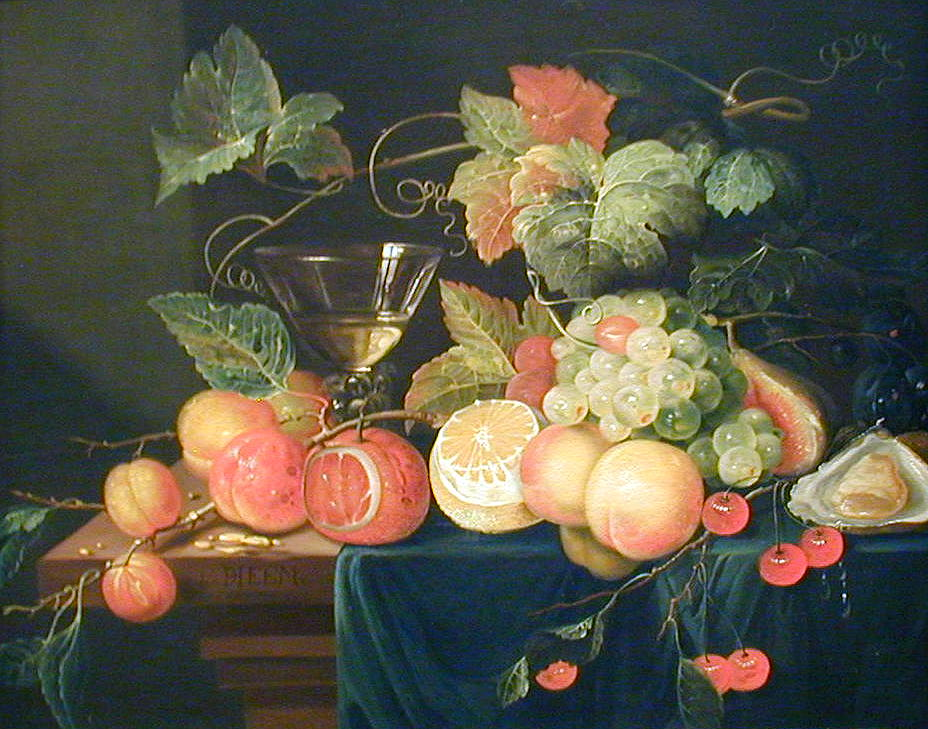
David de Heem I (c.1570-c.1632), Still Life with Fruit

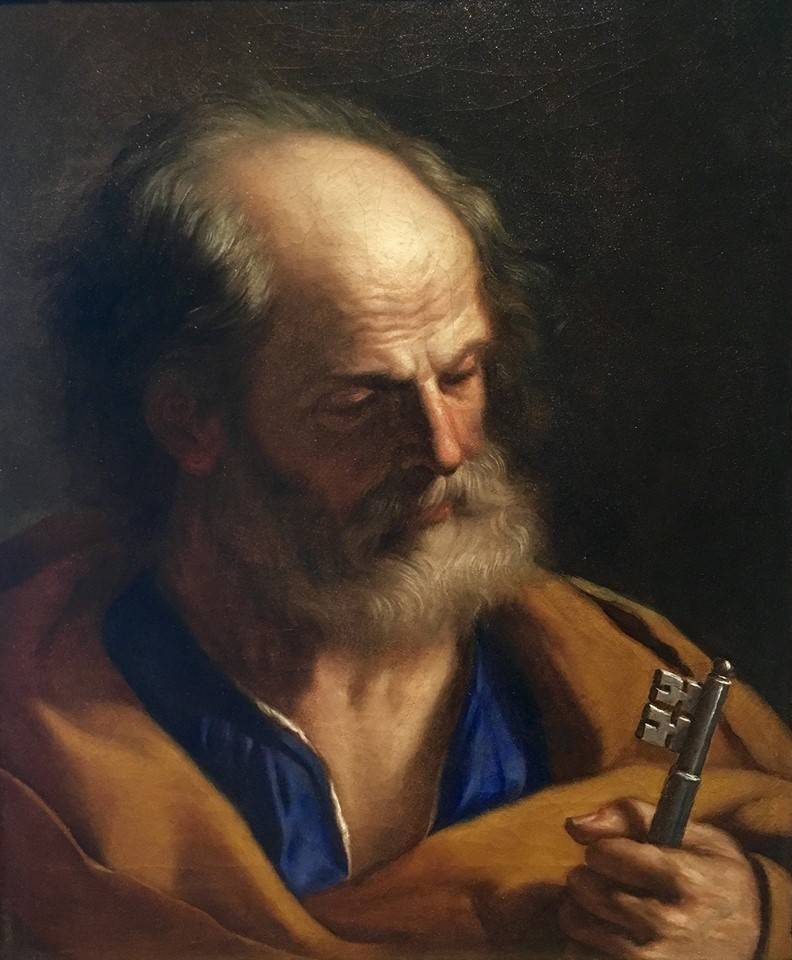
Guercino, Saint Peter, 1650

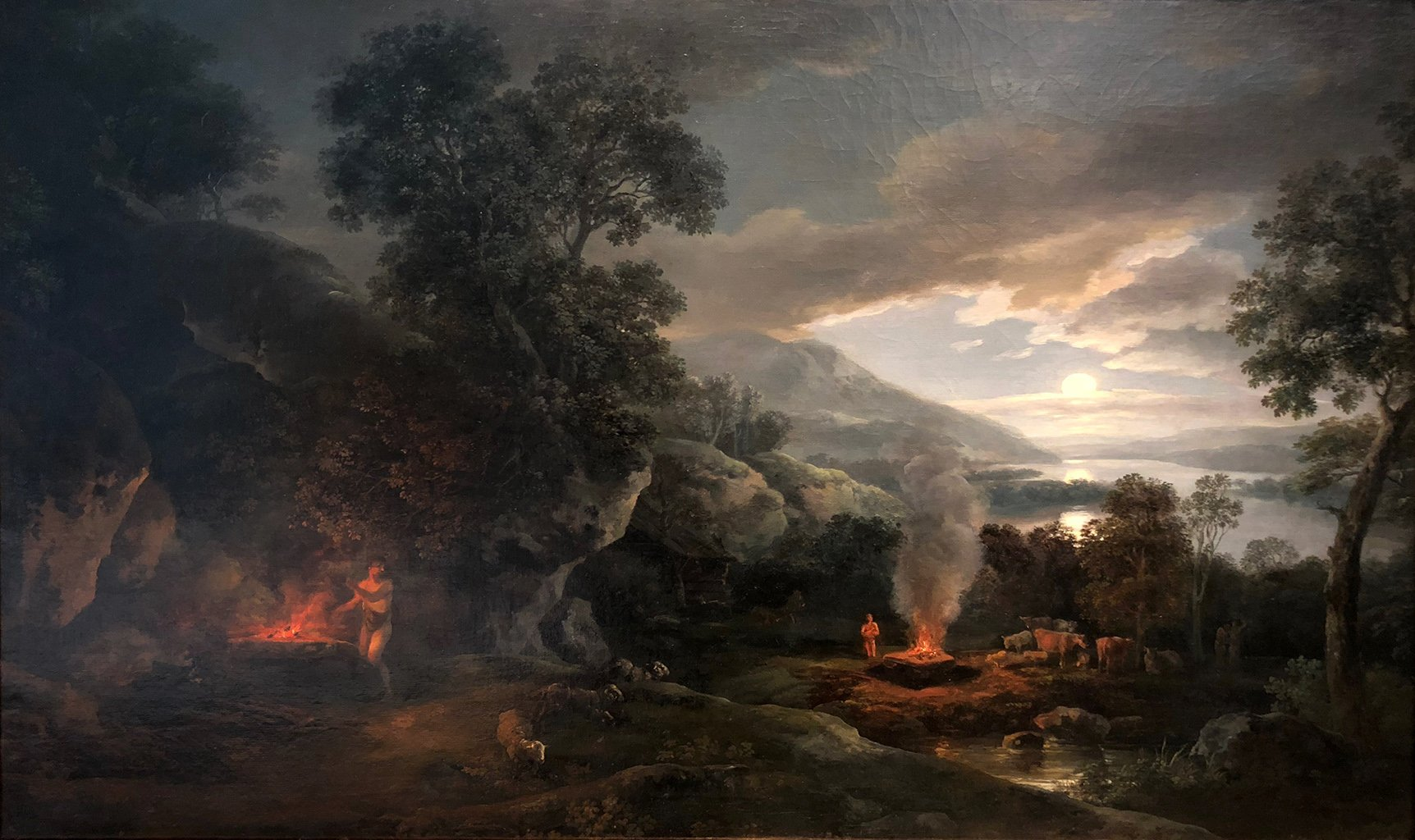
Claude-Joseph Vernet (1714–1789), Cain and Abel Bringing Their Sacrifices

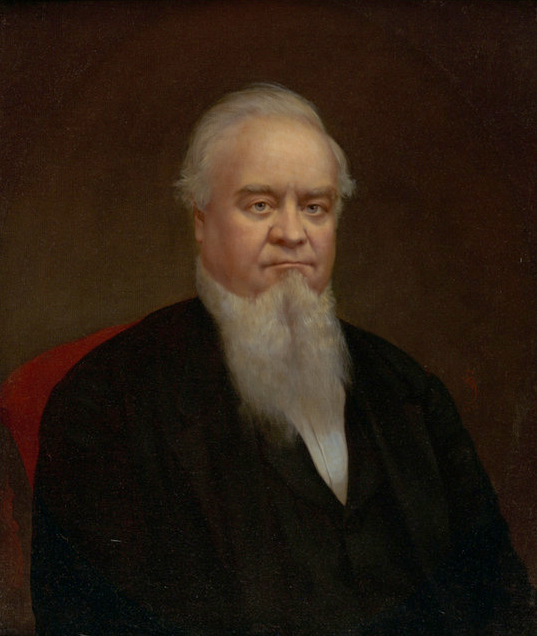
Stephen William Shaw, E.B. Crocker, 1872

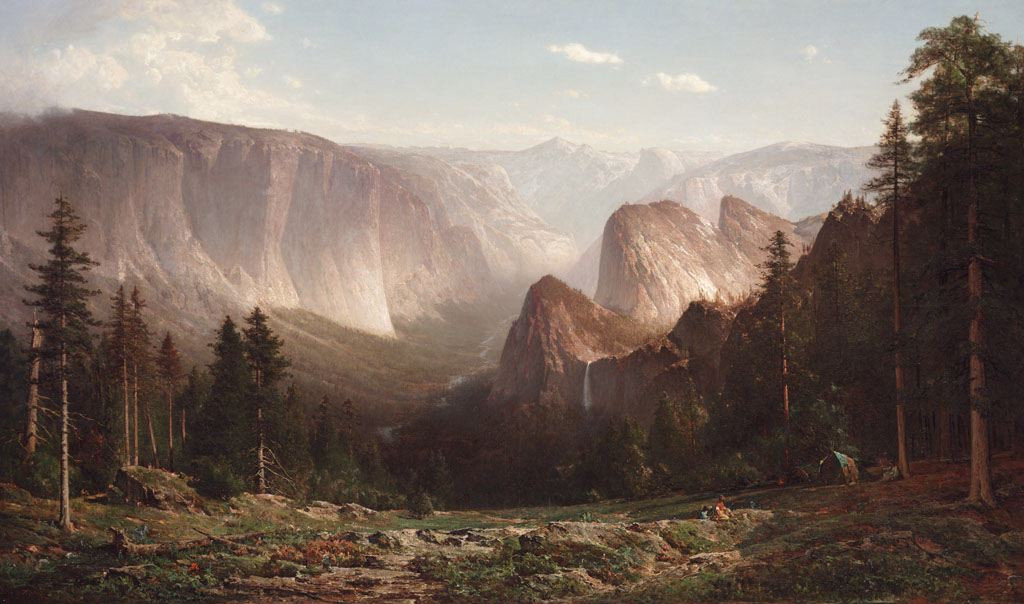
Thomas Hill, Great Canyon of the Sierra, Yosemite, 1872

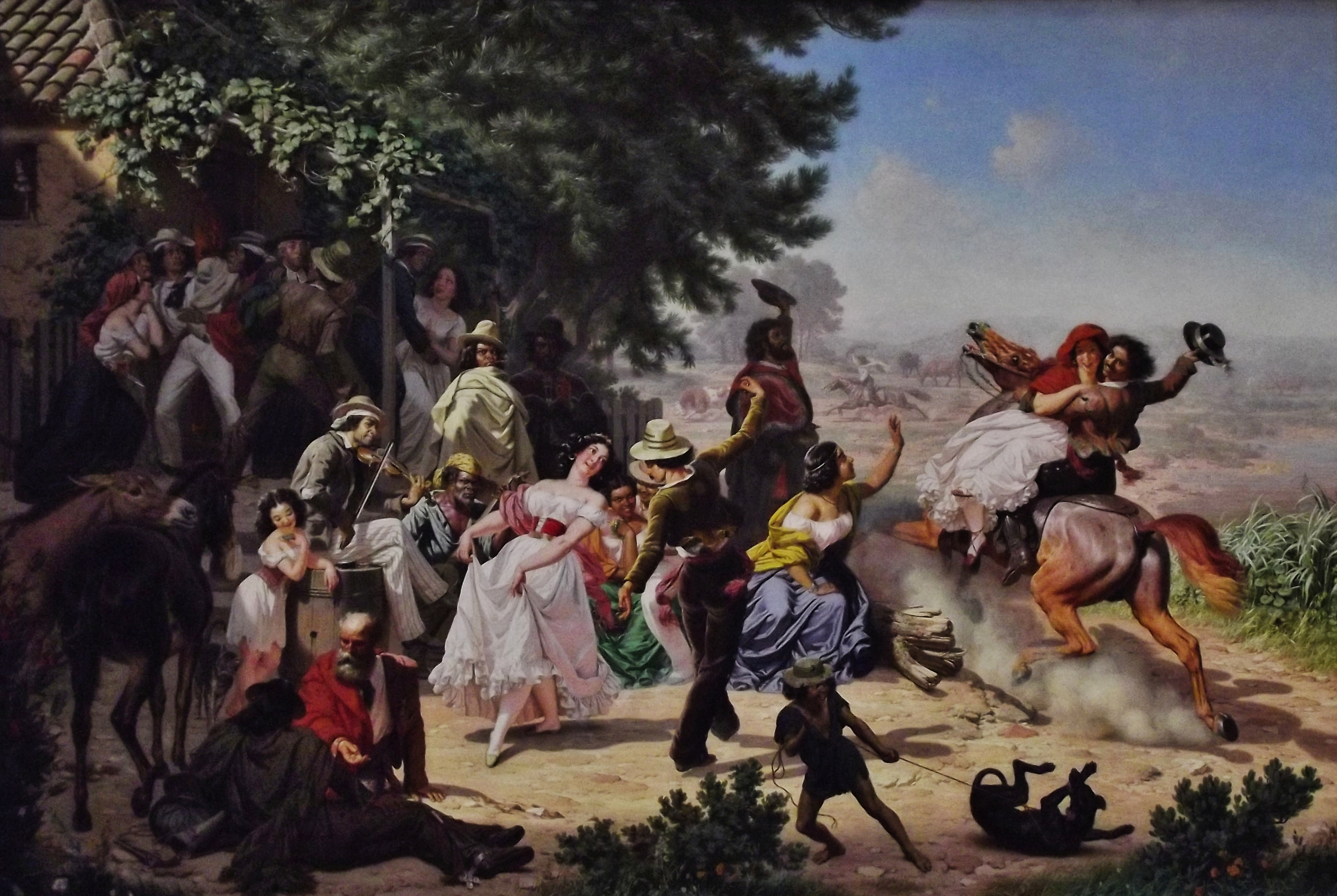
Charles Christian Nahl, The Fandango, 1873

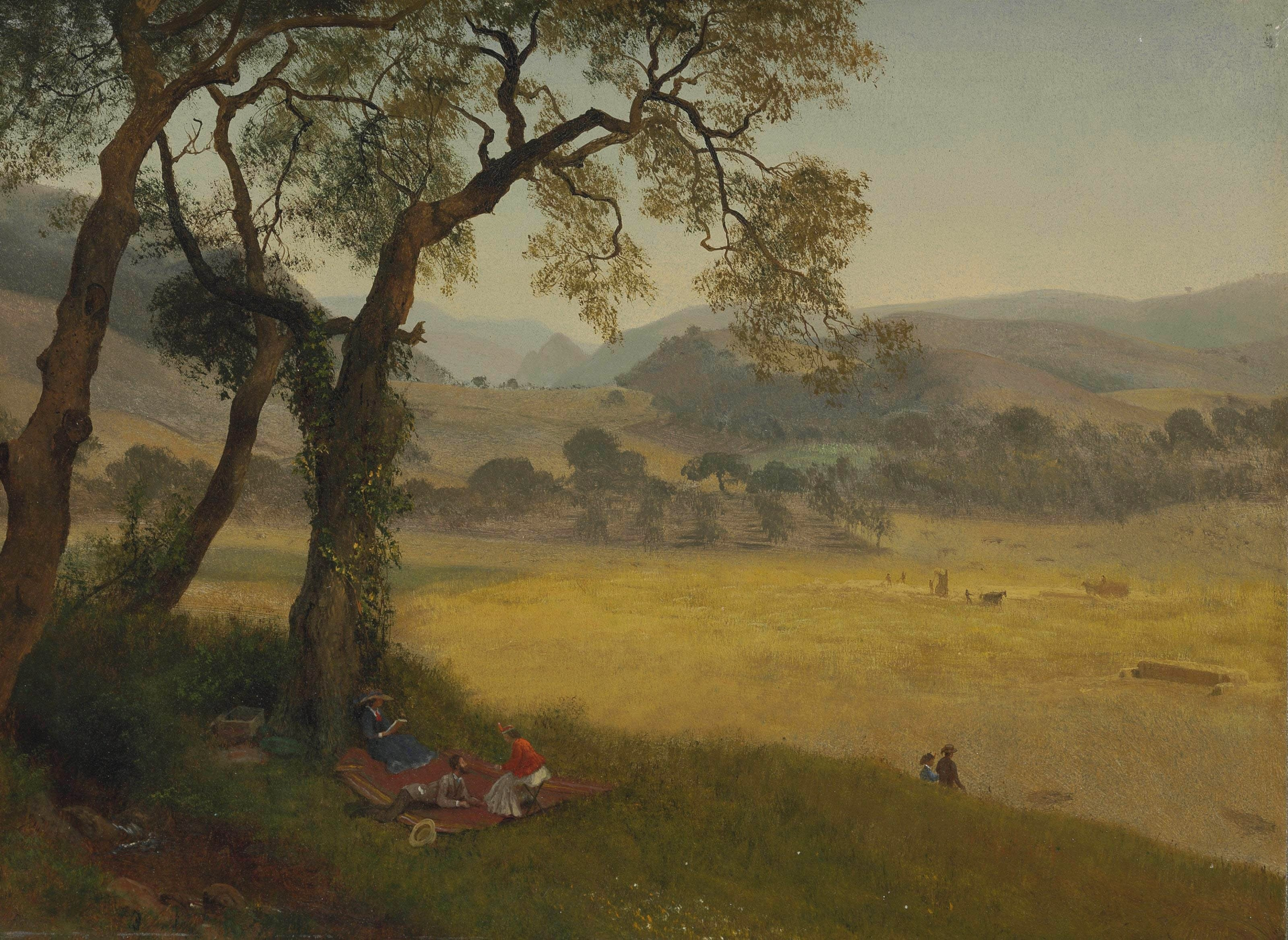
Albert Bierstadt, A Golden Summer Day Near Oakland, 1873

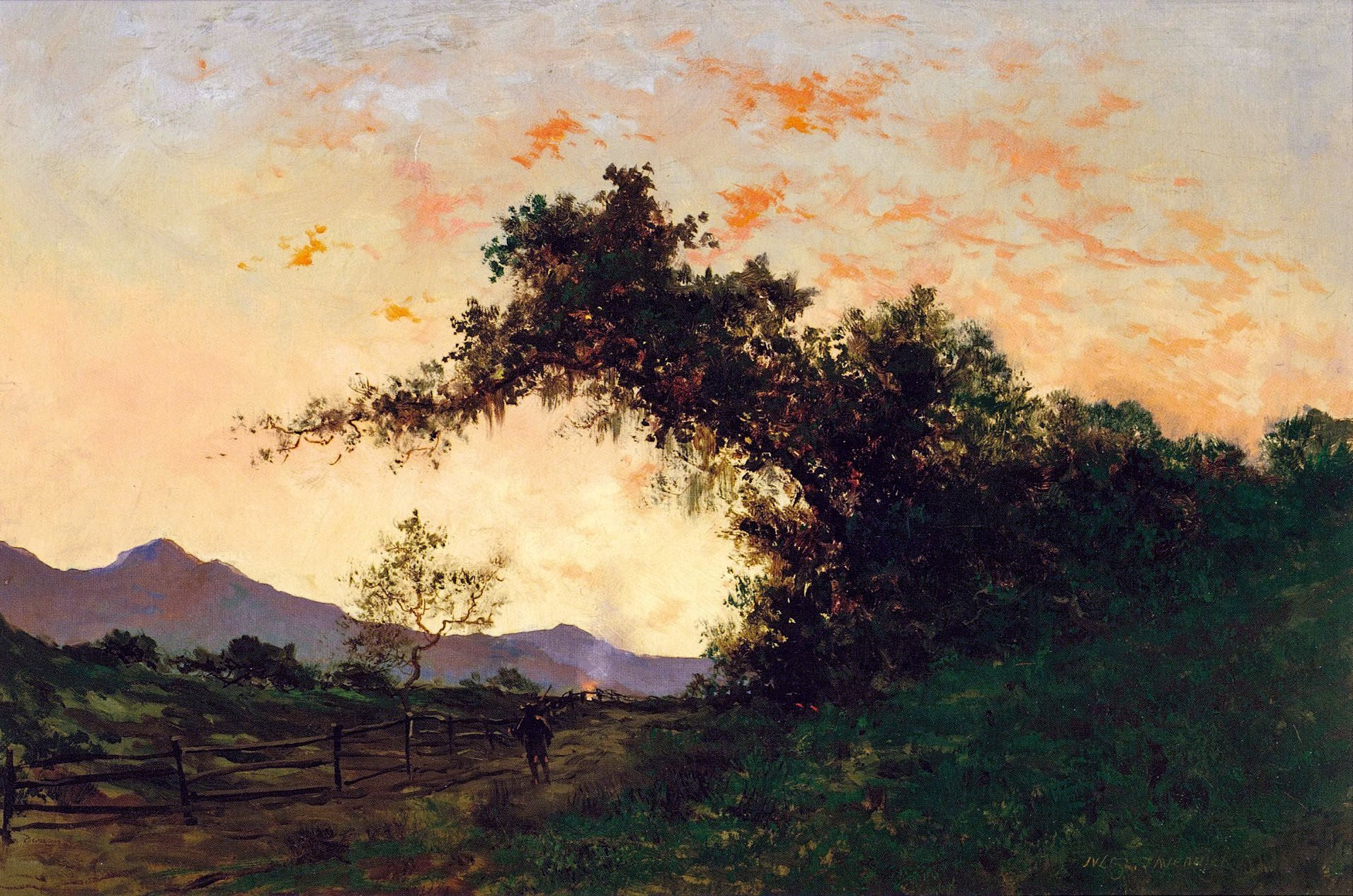
Jules Tavernier, Marin Sunset in Back of Petaluma, early 1880s

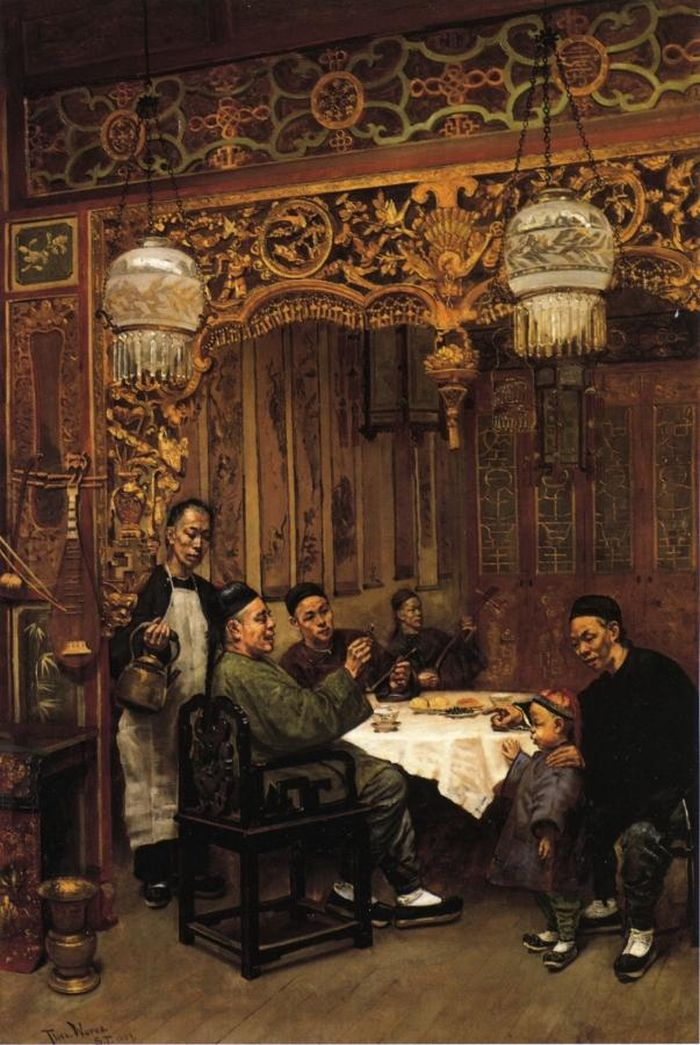
Theodore Wores, Chinese Restaurant, 1884

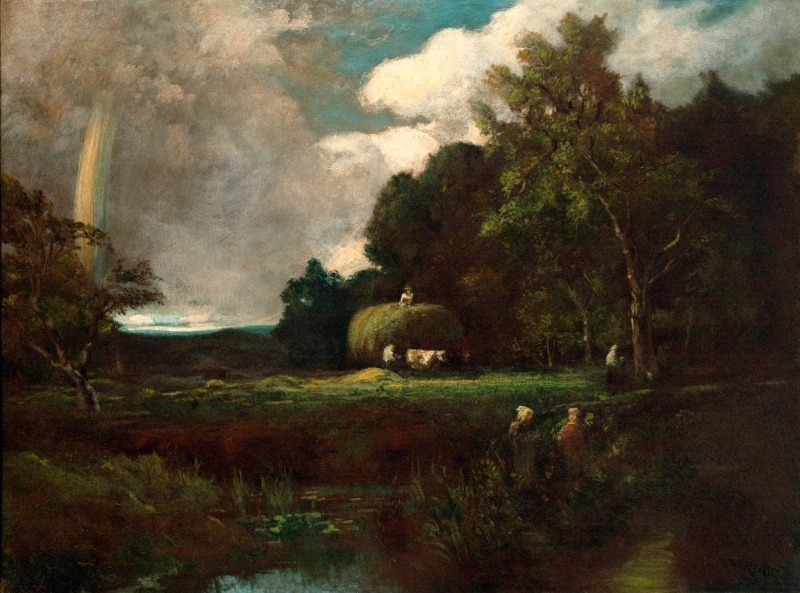
William Keith, After California Rain, 1890s

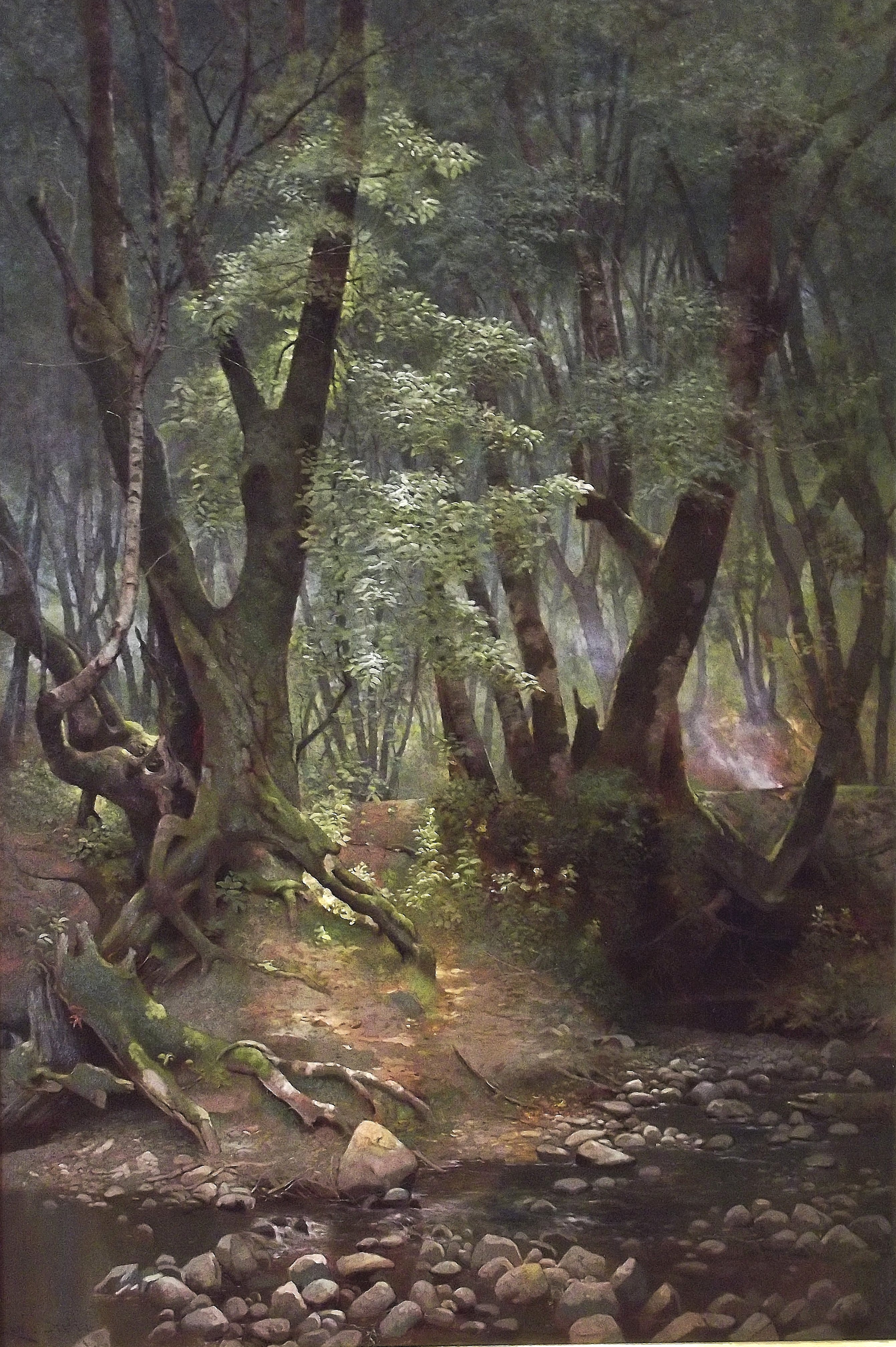
Edwin Deakin, Strawberry Creek, Berkeley, 1892

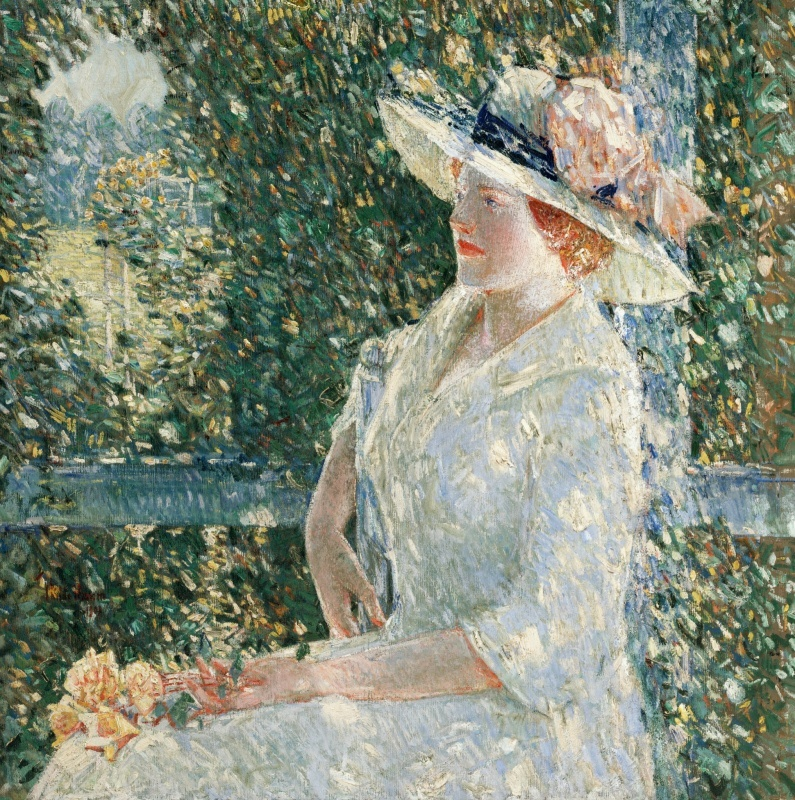
Childe Hassam, An Outdoor Portrait of Miss Weir, 1909

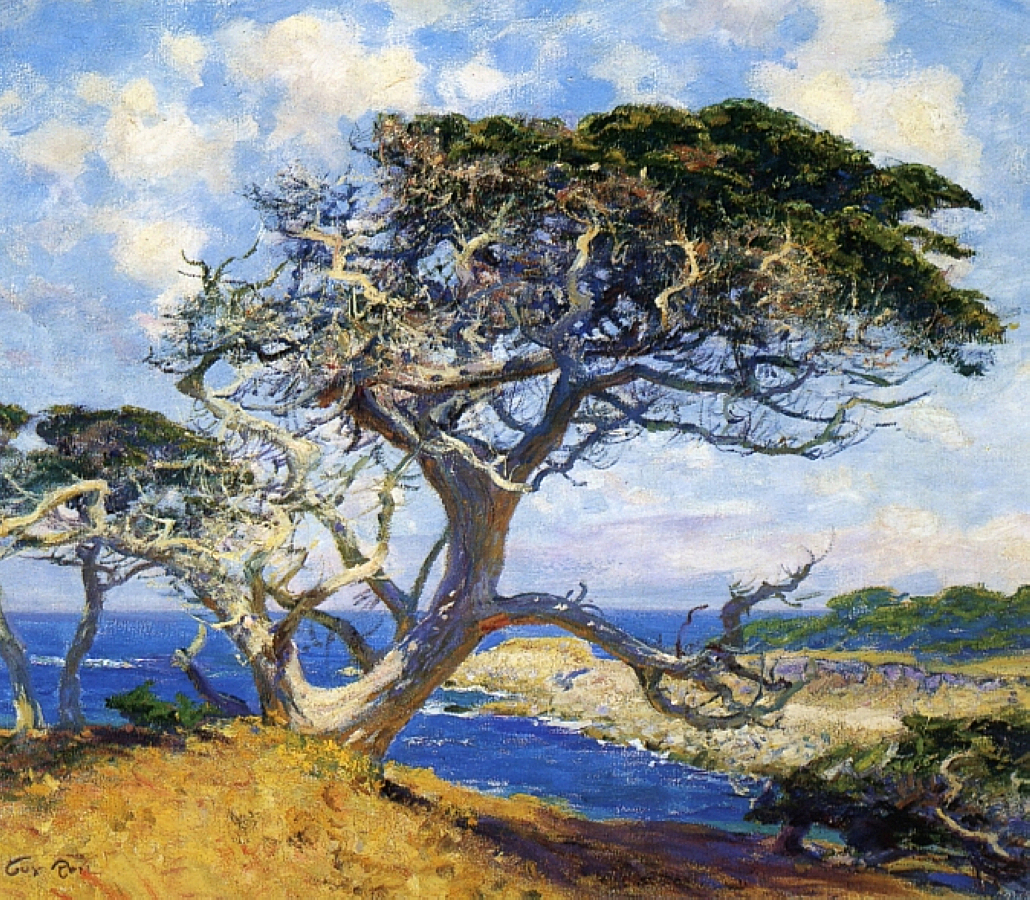
Guy Rose, Monterey Cypress, c. 1918

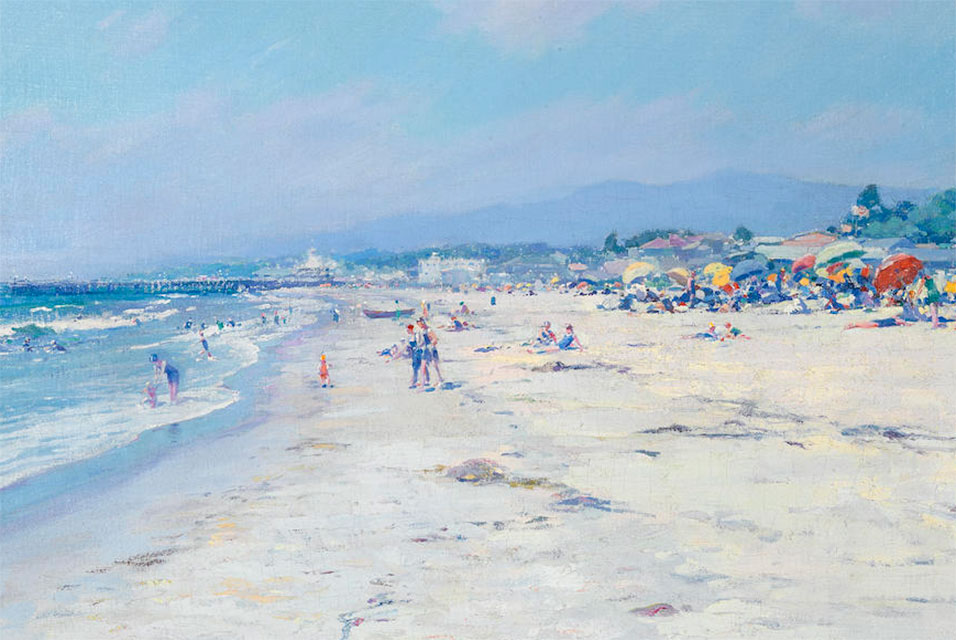
Jack Frost, The Beach, Santa Monica, 1921
