= 7th Venice International Film Festival (1946) =

Italian film festival in 1946

~~7th~~ Venice International Film Festival
- Festival poster
- Location: Venice, Italy
- Founded: 1932
- Festival date: 31 August – 15 September 1946
- Website: Website

The 7th annual Venice International Film Festival was held from 31 August to 15 September 1946. It is the first edition after the suspension, from 1943 to 1945, for the Second World War. This edition is regarded as a second foundation of Venice Film Festival. The prizes for the Best actor and other official prizes were not awarded: The prize for the Best film has lost the name of Mussolini Cup and above were unified into a single premium of the two (Best Foreign Film and Best Italian Film). This edition marks the return of the films of the United States that were absent since 1939.

== Jury ==
=== International Commission of journalists ===
- Francesco Pasinetti
- Umberto Barbaro
- Gino Visentini
- Francesco Callari
- Vinicio Marinucci
- Nikolaj Goršov
- Pierre Michaut

== In Competition ==
English title	Original title	Director(s)	Production country
—N/a	Sylvie et le Fantôme	Claude Autant-Lara	France
—N/a	L'Homme au chapeau rond	Pierre Billon	France
Panic	Panique	Julien Duvivier	France
Children of Paradise	Les Enfants du paradis	Marcel Carné	France
—N/a	L'Épouvantail (short film)	Paul Grimault	France
—N/a	Le Voleur de paratonnerres (short film)	Paul Grimault	France
The Sun Still Rises	Il sole sorge ancora	Aldo Vergano	Italy
—N/a	Eugenia Grandet	Mario Soldati	Italy
—N/a	Montecassino	Arturo Gemmiti	Italy
—N/a	Pian delle stelle	Giorgio Ferroni	Italy
—N/a	Paisà	Roberto Rossellini	Italy
—N/a	Bambini in città (short film)	Luigi Comencini	Italy
—N/a	Il cantico dei marmi (short film)	Giovanni Rossi, Piero Benedetti	Italy
The Southerner		Jean Renoir	USA

== Awards ==
- Best Feature Film
  - The Southerner (Jean Renoir)
- Volpi Cup
  - Best Actor - Not awarded.
  - Best Actress - Not awarded.
