= National Board of Review Awards 1945 =

Annual US film awards ceremony

17th National Board of Review Awards

December 21, 1945

"The True Glory"

The 17th National Board of Review Awards were announced on 21 December 1945.

== Best English Language Films ==
1. The True Glory
2. The Lost Weekend
3. The Southerner
4. The Story of G.I. Joe
5. The Last Chance
6. The Life and Death of Colonel Blimp
7. A Tree Grows In Brooklyn
8. The Fighting Lady
9. The Way Ahead
10. The Clock

== Winners ==
- Best English Language Film: The True Glory
- Best Actor: Ray Milland (The Lost Weekend)
- Best Actress: Joan Crawford (Mildred Pierce)
- Best Director: Jean Renoir (The Southerner)
