= Mildred Pierce (film) =

1945 American melodrama/film noir by Michael Curtiz

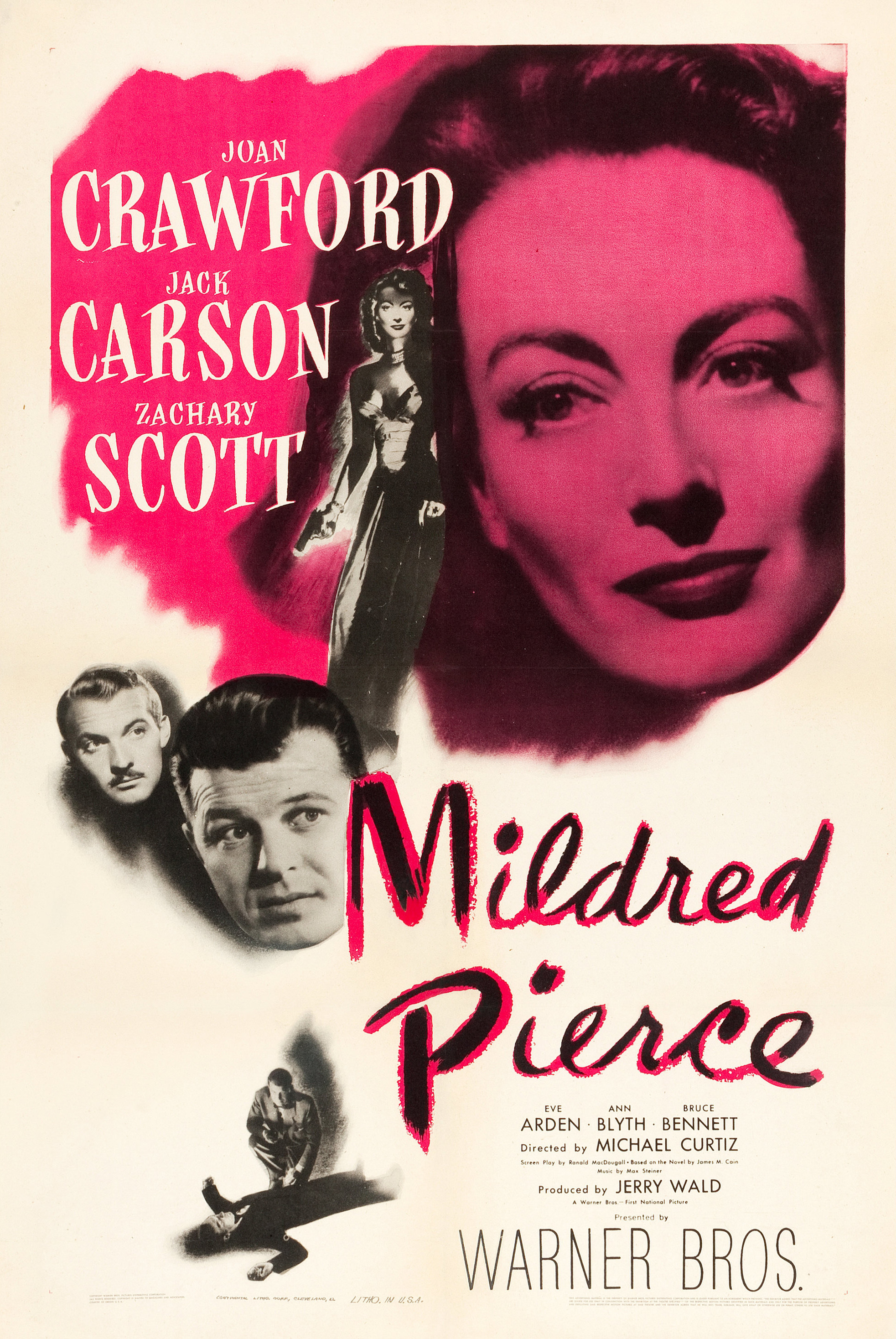
- Theatrical release poster
- Directed by: Michael Curtiz
- Screenplay by: Ranald MacDougall
- Based on: Mildred Pierce; 1941 novel by James M. Cain
- Produced by: Jerry Wald
- Starring: Joan Crawford; Jack Carson; Zachary Scott; Eve Arden; Ann Blyth; Bruce Bennett
- Cinematography: Ernest Haller
- Edited by: David Weisbart
- Music by: Max Steiner
- Distributed by: Warner Bros. Pictures
- Release dates: September 28, 1945 (New York City); October 20, 1945 (United States)
- Running time: 111 minutes
- Country: United States
- Language: English
- Budget: $1.4 million
- Box office: $5.6 million ($101 million in 2025)

Mildred Pierce is a 1945 American melodrama film noir directed by Michael Curtiz and starring Joan Crawford, Jack Carson, and Zachary Scott, and featuring Eve Arden, Ann Blyth, and Bruce Bennett. Based on the 1941 novel by James M. Cain, this was Crawford's first starring role for Warner Bros. Pictures after leaving Metro-Goldwyn-Mayer. She won the Academy Award for Best Actress for her performance. In 1996, Mildred Pierce was deemed "culturally, historically, or aesthetically significant" and selected for preservation in the United States Library of Congress National Film Registry.

== Plot ==
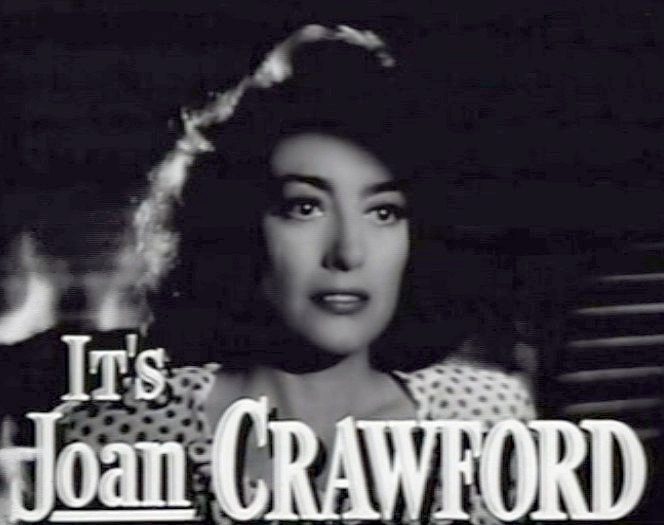
From the trailer for the film

Monte Beragon, the second husband of Mildred Pierce, is murdered. The police tell Mildred her first husband, Bert Pierce, is guilty of the murder, because he owned the gun, had a motive, and does not deny the crime. Mildred protests that he is too kind to commit murder and reveals her story to the officer in flashback.

Mildred and Bert are unhappily married. After Bert splits with his business partner, Wally Fay, Mildred must sell her baked goods to support the family. Bert accuses Mildred of favoring their two daughters over him. Their quarrel intensifies after a phone call from Bert's mistress, Maggie Biederhof, and they separate.

Mildred retains custody of 14-year-old Veda, a bratty social climber, and 10-year-old Kay, a tomboy. Mildred's principal goal is to provide material possessions for Veda, who longs for high social status and is ashamed of her mother being a baker. Mildred hides her other job as a waitress, but Veda learns the truth and treats her mother with disdain.

Mildred meets Monte Beragon, a Pasadena society playboy with an almost-depleted inheritance. Beragon owns the building that Mildred wants to purchase for a restaurant, and he pursues a romantic interest in her. While the two are at his beach house for a weekend, Kay contracts pneumonia and dies after a trip to Lake Arrowhead with Veda and Bert. Mildred channels her grief into work and throws herself into opening a new restaurant. With help from her friend and former supervisor, Ida Corwin, Mildred's restaurant is successful. Wally helps Mildred buy the property, and soon she owns a chain of restaurants throughout Southern California.

Veda secretly marries well-to-do Ted Forrester for his money and position, but his mother objects. Veda agrees to dissolve the marriage but claims she is pregnant and demands $10,000 from the Forresters. Veda smugly confesses her pregnancy is a sham to Mildred, who tears up the check and throws her out of the house.

Bert, too distraught to tell Mildred about Veda's latest escapade, takes her to Wally's nightclub, where Veda performs as a lounge singer. After seeing several sailors in the audience wolf-whistle at Veda in her sexy costume, Mildred begs her to come home. Veda sneers and says her mother can never give her the lifestyle she deserves.

Desperate to reconcile with her daughter, Mildred coaxes Monte into a loveless marriage to improve her social status, with Monte's price being a one-third share of her business to allow him to settle his debts. Veda, eager to live out her dream as a debutante, pretends to reconcile with her mother and moves into Beragon's lavish mansion.

Eventually, the cost of supporting Monte's and Veda's affluent lifestyles—and Monte's underhanded ploy to retain his share in the business while causing his wife to forfeit her own—bankrupts Mildred, forcing her to sell the restaurant chain. After driving to his beach house to confront Monte, Mildred finds Veda in his arms. Veda scornfully tells her mother that Monte intends to marry her after divorcing Mildred, who runs to her car in tears after dropping a gun she intended to use on Monte. When Monte tells Veda he would never marry her because she is a "rotten little tramp", she shoots him with Mildred's gun.

Veda begs her mother to help conceal the murder; Mildred reluctantly agrees. Fed up with Wally's misdeeds—helping Veda blackmail the Forresters, hiring her to sing in his seedy nightclub, assenting to Monte's business move against her, and making constant sexual overtures toward her—Mildred tries to pin the murder on Wally by luring him to the beach house. Police officers arrest Wally when he flees in panic after seeing Monte's body. Still, the investigating officer tells Mildred that Wally cannot be the killer because he has no motive.

In the present, the detectives admit they knew all along that Veda committed the murder. Mildred tries to apologize as her daughter is sent to jail, but Veda rebuffs her. Mildred leaves the police station to find Bert waiting for her outside.

== Cast ==
- Joan Crawford as Mildred Pierce Beragon
- Jack Carson as Wally Fay
- Zachary Scott as Monte Beragon
- Eve Arden as Ida Corwin
- Ann Blyth as Veda Pierce Forrester
- Bruce Bennett as Albert "Bert" Pierce
- Lee Patrick as Mrs. Maggie Biederhof
- Moroni Olsen as Inspector Peterson
- Veda Ann Borg as Miriam Ellis
- Jo Ann Marlowe as Kay Pierce
- Butterfly McQueen as Lottie (uncredited)
- John Compton as Ted Forrester (uncredited)
- Charles Trowbridge as lawyer (uncredited)
- Garry Owen as the policeman on the pier (uncredited)

== Comparison to the novel ==
Although James M. Cain was often labeled a "hard-boiled crime writer", his novel Mildred Pierce (1941) was mostly a psychological work, with little violence. The adaptation, released four years later, was designed as a thriller, and a murder was introduced into the plot.

The novel spans nine years (from 1931 to 1940), whereas the film is set from 1939 to the 1940s and spans only four years. Its characters do not age as a consequence. Mildred's physical appearance does not change, although her costumes become more elegant as her business grows. Veda ages from around 13 to 17. Mildred is more of a tycoon in the film; her restaurants are glamorous places, and she owns a whole chain (Mildred's) instead of the novel's three. Evil, spoiled Veda, who is prodigiously talented and brilliantly devious in the novel, is somewhat less formidable in the film. All references to the Depression and the Prohibition era, which are important in the novel, are absent from the screenplay.

The plot is simplified and the number of characters reduced. Veda's training and success as a singer (including her performance at the Hollywood Bowl) were dropped in the film and her music teachers only mentioned in passing. Lucy Gessler, a key character in the novel and Mildred's good friend, is eliminated. Ida, Mildred's boss at the restaurant where she works as a waitress, is given much of Gessler's wise-cracking personality.

Monte does not die in the novel, and Veda never goes to jail. The murder portion of the story was invented by the filmmakers because the censorship code of that time required evildoers to be punished for their misdeeds. The 2011 HBO miniseries Mildred Pierce follows the novel more faithfully in this respect.

== Production ==
The working title for Mildred Pierce was House on the Sand. Its filming began on December 7, 1944, and it was shot in Glendale and Malibu, California. Ralph Bellamy, Donald Woods, and George Coulouris were considered for the role of Bert, and Bonita Granville, Virginia Weidler, and Martha Vickers were considered for Veda. Permission had to be received from the U.S. Navy to shoot in Malibu because of wartime restrictions.

At the end of 1943, Joan Crawford asked for her release from Metro-Goldwyn-Mayer due to a mutual agreement, and signed with Warner Bros. seeking better film roles. Crawford campaigned for the lead role in Mildred Pierce, which most lead actresses did not want because of the implied age as mother of a teenage daughter. Warner Bros. and director Michael Curtiz originally wanted Barbara Stanwyck to play the title role, but she declined. Curtiz did not initially want Crawford to play the part, thinking she was not right for the role, but he approved Crawford's casting after seeing her screen test. At first, Curtiz and Crawford were at odds on the set, with producer Jerry Wald acting as peacemaker. Eventually, Curtiz and Crawford became good friends and worked together several years later on Flamingo Road.

== Reception ==
=== Box office ===
The film was a box-office success. According to Warner Bros. figures, it earned $3,483,000 (equivalent to $62,288,000 in 2025) in the United States and $2,155,000 (equivalent to $42,365,000 in 2025) in other markets.

=== Critical response ===
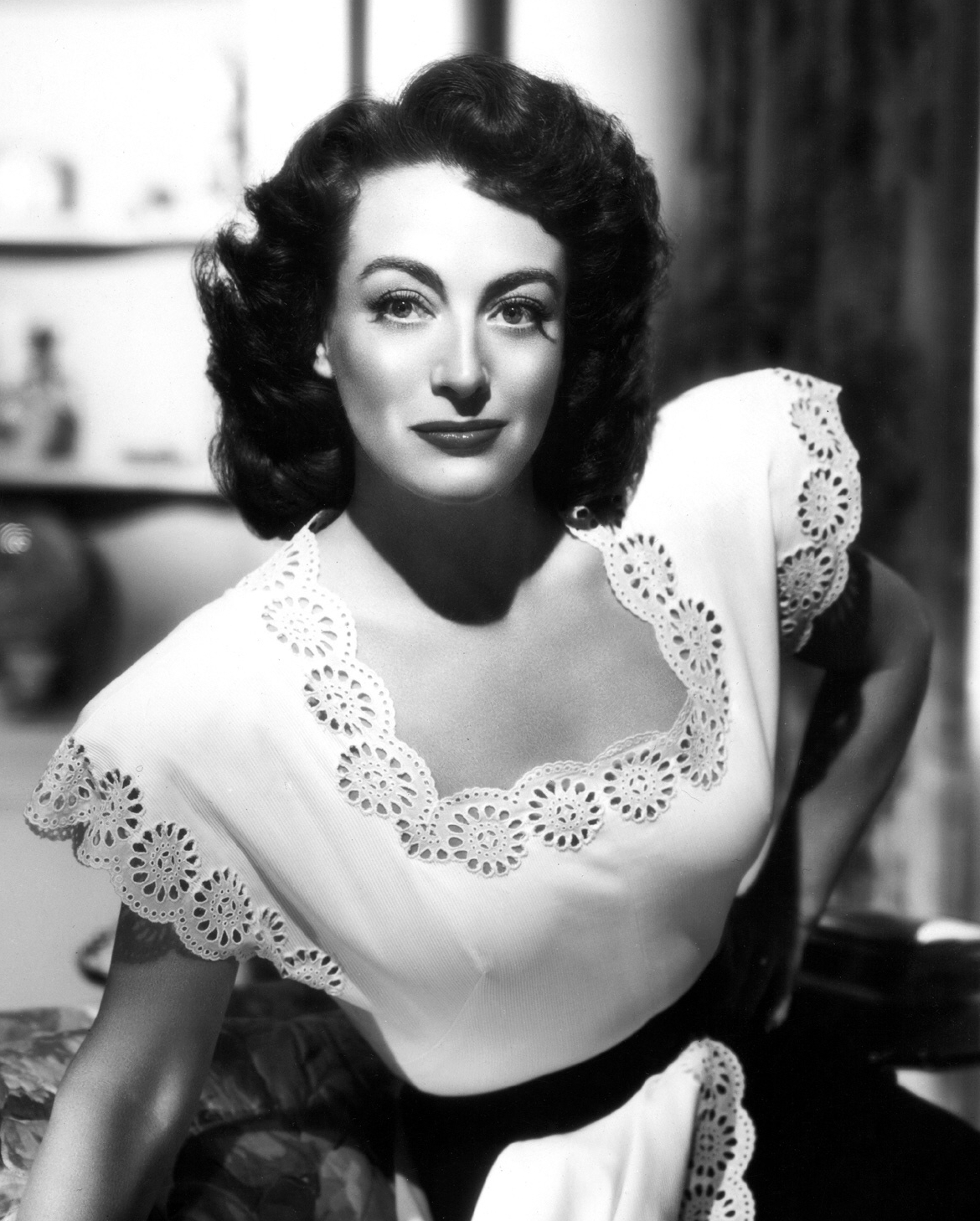
Joan Crawford's performance garnered widespread critical acclaim and eventually won her the Academy Award for Best Actress; pictured is from Humoresque (1946).

Contemporary reviews praised Crawford's performance but had mixed opinions about other aspects of the film. A review in The New York Times stated that, although Crawford gave "a sincere and generally effective characterization", the film "lacks the driving force of stimulating drama", and it did "not seem reasonable that a level-headed person like Mildred Pierce, who builds a fabulously successful chain of restaurants on practically nothing, could be so completely dominated by a selfish and grasping daughter, who spells trouble in capital letters." Writing in The Nation in 1945, film critic and author James Agee: "Nasty, gratifying version of the James Cain novel ... Attempt made to sell Mildred as noble when she is merely idiotic or at best pathetic; but constant, virulent, lambent attention to money and its effects, and more authentic suggestions of sex than one hopes to see in American films." Pauline Kael wrote: "Miss Crawford's heavy breathing was certified as acting when she won an Academy Award for her performance here." Leslie Halliwell gave it two of four stars: "A woman's picture par excellence, glossily and moodily photographed, with a star suffering in luxury on behalf of the most ungrateful daughter of all time."

Film critic of the time, Pauline Kael, mentions that the film, and others like it, work on the seducing adult being sophisticated and worldly while the manipulated youth are basically innocent kids.

William Brogdon of Variety liked the film, especially the screenplay, and wrote:

At first reading James M. Cain's novel of the same title might not suggest screenable material, but the cleanup job has resulted in a class feature, showmanly produced by Jerry Wald and tellingly directed by Michael Curtiz ... The dramatics are heavy but so skillfully handled that they never cloy. Joan Crawford reaches a peak of her acting career in this pic. Ann Blyth, as the daughter, scores dramatically in her first genuine acting assignment. Zachary Scott makes the most of his character as the Pasadena heel, a talented performance.

Harrison's Reports wrote that Crawford delivered a "good performance", but the story "lacks conviction, and the main characterizations are overdrawn. For example, the daughter's hatred for her mother has no logical basis, consequently, it weakens the story."

John McCarten of The New Yorker wrote:

Certainly, despite its unconscionable length—it takes almost two hours—Mildred Pierce contains enough excitement to jolt even the most lethargic customer...it is pleasant to report that Miss Crawford is no longer as frantic in appearance as she once was. Despite all kinds of chances to go berserk as a Cain mother, Miss Crawford remains subdued and reasonable, like most of the rest of a highly competent cast.

In a 2005 review, Jeremiah Kipp of Slant Magazine gave the film a mixed review:

Mildred Pierce is melodramatic trash, constructed like a reliable Aristotelian warhorse where characters have planted the seeds of their own doom in the first act, only to have grief-stricken revelations at the climax. Directed by studio favorite Michael Curtiz in German Expressionistic mode, which doesn't quite go with the California beaches and sunlight but sets the bleak tone of domestic film noir, and scored by Max Steiner with a sensational bombast that's rousing even when it doesn't match the quieter, pensive mood of individual scenes, Mildred Pierce is professionally executed and moves at a brisk clip.

In 1978, historian June Sochen argued the film lies at the intersection of the "weepie" and "independent woman" genres of the 1930s and 1940s. It accentuates common ground of the two: Women must be submissive, live through others, and remain in the home.

In his 1986 book Guide for the Film Fanatic, Danny Peary wrote,

[Mildred Pierce] is essentially a film noir piece where it's a woman, [Joan] Crawford, rather than a man, who is led by a greedy, manipulative, evil femme fatale – in this case, the woman's daughter, [Ann] Blyth – down a fatalistic path full of deception, money for greedy people, murder, and doom (only here an optimistic ending is added). Like classic femme fatales, Blyth is the catalyst for the moral protagonist to reveal not so admirable traits – indeed, Blyth personifies Crawford's sublimated greed and ambition due to an impoverished upbringing. [Mildred Pierce] is also a standard "woman's picture," a soap opera about suffering mothers in the Stella Dallas tradition. But here is the rare case in which we think the mother is foolish for leading her life to please her daughter – because, unlike the daughters in those other films who were basically flawed but decent girls, Blyth isn't worthy of anyone's devotion.

Peary also wrote,

Crawford's faltering career was saved with her Oscar-winning portrayal of Mildred Pierce, regarded by many as her quintessential role, one that melded together several of her screen personae. But she's really not very good, playing every scene in an understated manner. Her Mildred isn't an interesting character to begin with – despite her strength, despite being a working woman/businesswoman. Since she's the type of woman who attracts bland losers such as [Bruce] Bennett, [Zachary] Scott, and Jack Carson, one can't be too impressed.

The February 2020 issue of New York Magazine lists Mildred Pierce as among "The Best Movies That Lost Best Picture at the Oscars."

On the review aggregator website Rotten Tomatoes, the film holds an approval rating of 88% based on 50 reviews, with an average rating of 8.1/10. The website's critics consensus reads, "Tied together by a powerhouse performance from Joan Crawford, Mildred Pierce blends noir and social drama to soapily intoxicating effect.".

Gay Following

Mildred Pierce is the focus of David M. Halperin's 2012 book How to be Gay, which describes the film as "a gay male cult classic," which "helped Crawford achieve her status as a notorious gay icon."

=== Accolades ===
Award	Category	Nominee(s)	Result
Academy Awards	Best Picture	Jerry Wald (for Warner Bros.)	Nominated
Academy Awards	Best Actress	Joan Crawford	Won
Academy Awards	Best Supporting Actress	Eve Arden	Nominated
Academy Awards	Best Supporting Actress	Ann Blyth	Nominated
Academy Awards	Best Screenplay	Ranald MacDougall	Nominated
Academy Awards	Best Cinematography – Black-and-White	Ernest Haller	Nominated
National Board of Review Awards	Best Actress	Joan Crawford	Won
National Film Preservation Board	National Film Registry		Inducted
New York Film Critics Circle Awards	Best Actress	Joan Crawford	Nominated

American Film Institute lists

- AFI's 100 Years ... 100 Heroes and Villains:
  - Veda Pierce – Nominated Villain
- AFI's 100 Years ... 100 Movie Quotes:
  - "Personally, Veda's convinced me that alligators have the right idea. They eat their young." – Nominated
- AFI's 100 Years ... 100 Movies (10th Anniversary Edition) – Nominated

== Adaptations ==
A 5-part miniseries of Mildred Pierce premiered on HBO in March 2011, starring Kate Winslet as Mildred, Guy Pearce as Beragon, Evan Rachel Wood as Veda, and Mare Winningham as Ida. Separate actresses portray Veda at different ages, as opposed to Ann Blyth alone in the 1945 film. Wally Fay's character in the original has been changed back to the novel's Wally Burgan, and is portrayed by James LeGros. The cast also includes Melissa Leo as Mildred's neighbor and friend, Lucy Gessler, a character omitted from the Crawford version. The film is told in chronological order with no flashbacks or voice-over narration, and eliminates the murder subplot that was added for the 1945 version.

== Mildred Pierce in popular culture ==
=== In films ===
The 1981 film Mommie Dearest mentions the screen test Crawford (played by Faye Dunaway) must endure, a rehearsal scene at her home for the film, a portrayal of her at home during the Academy Awards radio broadcast announcing the 1945 winners, and her acceptance speech outside her home for a team of reporters.

=== In television ===
In 1976, the ninth episode of the tenth season of The Carol Burnett Show featured a take-off of the film called "Mildred Fierce", with Carol Burnett as Mildred, Vicki Lawrence as Veda, and Harvey Korman as Monte.

In the third episode of The Deuce, "The Principle Is All", Darlene watches Mildred Pierce with one of her regulars.

In 2017, Feud showcased the famous rivalry of Crawford and actress Bette Davis (Susan Sarandon), in which Jessica Lange portrays Joan. Lange can be seen throughout the series in a variety of flashbacks depicting Crawford's famous roles. The Mildred Pierce bit recreates the slapping scene between Mildred and Veda.

=== In music ===
The eighth track on the 1990 album Goo by alternative rock band Sonic Youth is titled "Mildred Pierce".

=== Other ===
A bar and restaurant called Mildred Pierce opened in late 1980 on Manhattan's 46th Street, between Eighth and Ninth Avenues.

The Gainesville, Florida, restaurant Mildred's Big City Food is named after the film's title character.

The movie appears as a collectable film reel in 2011's L.A. Noire.

== Home media ==
Mildred Pierce is available on Region 2 DVD in a single disc edition which includes an 86-minute documentary about the career and personal life of Joan Crawford. The documentary features contributions from fellow actors and directors, including Diane Baker, Betsy Palmer, Anna Lee, Anita Page, Cliff Robertson, Virginia Grey, Dickie Moore, Norma Shearer, Ben Cooper, Margaret O'Brien, Judy Geeson, and Vincent Sherman. Mildred Pierce is also included in a Region 2 signature collection of Crawford's films with Possessed, Grand Hotel, The Damned Don't Cry, and Humoresque.

The Region 1 edition is a flipper single disc with "Joan Crawford: The Ultimate Movie Star" documentary and a series of trailer galleries on the reverse of the film.

Mildred Pierce is available on DVD and Blu-ray from The Criterion Collection for Regions 1 and 2 in a special edition which includes a host of special features, including "Joan Crawford: The Ultimate Movie Star", a 2002 feature-length documentary, a Q&A with actor Ann Blyth from 2006, a conversation on the film between critics Molly Haskell and Robert Polito, an excerpt from The David Frost Show featuring Joan Crawford, a booklet with an essay by critic Imogen Sara Smith, and more.

The 2017 4K restoration of the film was released on 4K UHD on March 7, 2023, by Criterion.

== See also ==
- List of cult films
