= The Notebooks of Captain Georges =

1966 novel by Jean Renoir

- Author: Jean Renoir
- Original title: Les Cahiers du Capitaine Georges
- Language: French
- Publisher: Éditions Gallimard
- Publication date: 23 February 1966
- Publication place: France
- English publication date: 19 October 1966
- Pages: 328

The Notebooks of Captain Georges: Memories of Love and Warfare 1894–1945 (French: Les Cahiers du Capitaine Georges. Souvenirs d'amour et de guerre, 1894–1945) is a 1966 novel by the French writer Jean Renoir. It follows the life, especially lovelife, of an upper-class Frenchman who serves in the First and Second World Wars.

Renoir had been a famous film director and screenwriter since the 1920s. The Notebooks of Captain Georges was the first of four novels he wrote when he was unable to get funding or in too poor health to direct films.
