= Renoir, My Father =

1962 book by Jean Renoir

- Author: Jean Renoir
- Original title: Pierre-Auguste Renoir, mon père
- Language: French
- Subject: Pierre-Auguste Renoir
- Genre: biography
- Publisher: Hachette
- Publication date: 1962
- Publication place: France
- English publication date: 5 November 1962

Renoir, My Father (French: Pierre-Auguste Renoir, mon père) is a 1962 biography about the French painter Pierre-Auguste Renoir, written by his son Jean Renoir. It describes the 19th-century Paris in which Renoir and the Impressionist painters emerged, covers Renoir's career developments, and portrays his character and thoughts, based on Jean Renoir's memories of him.

Heavy on anecdotes rather than meticulous research, Raymond Durgnat called the book Boswellian, which means it is "an inspired reportage tracing a sensibility throughout dimensions which the work reveals without defining".

The book received the Charles-Blanc Prize from the Académie Française.
