= Mildred's Big City Food =

Restaurant in Gainesville, Florida

Coordinates: 29.65114°N 82.37461°W

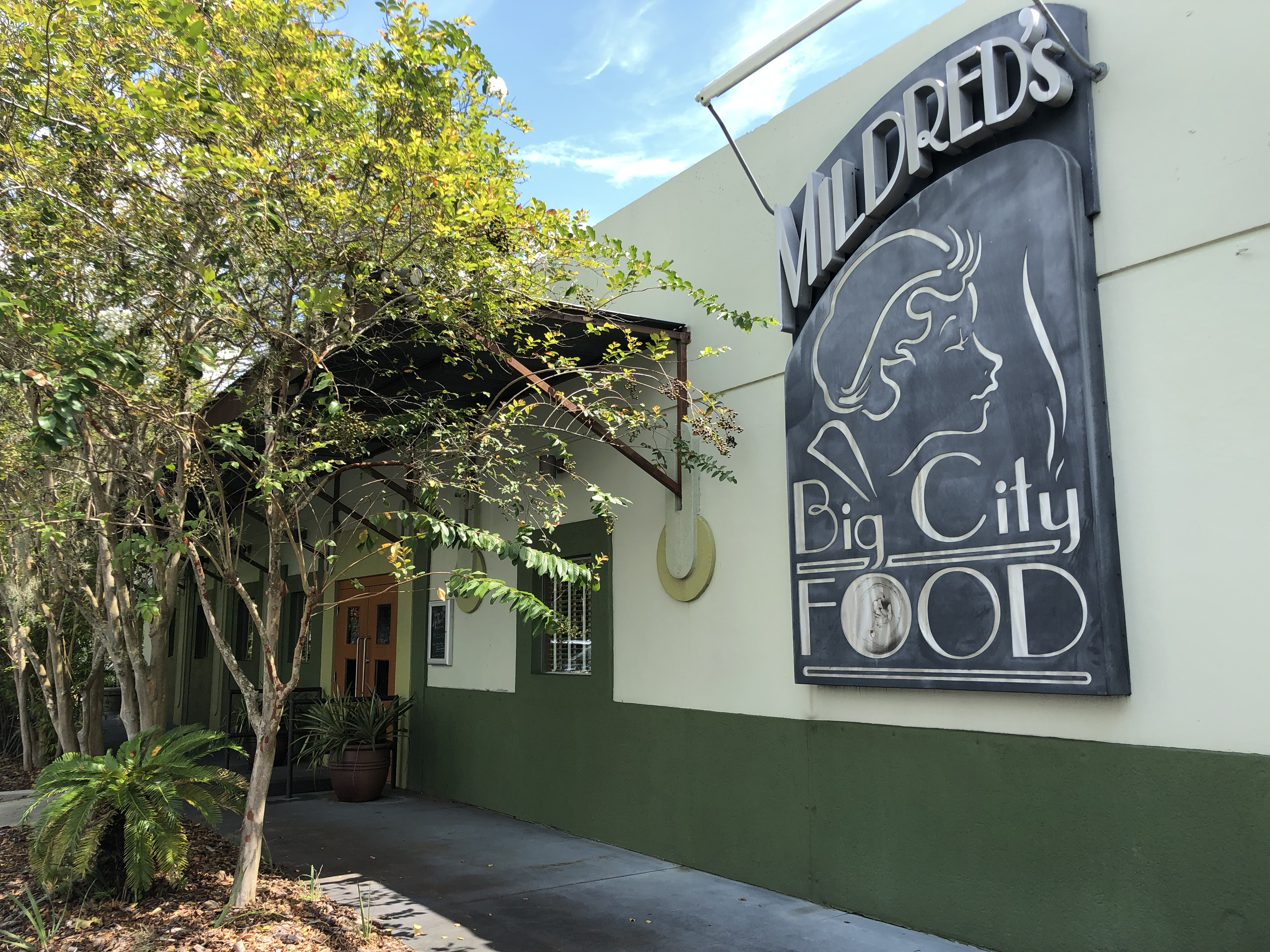
- Company type: Private
- Industry: Restaurant
- Founded: Micanopy, Florida (1994)
- Key people: Bert Gill (owner); Russell and Nancy Baum (former co-owners)
- Website: mildredsbigcityfood.com

Mildred's Big City Food is a restaurant in Gainesville, Florida.

== History ==
Opened around 1994 as Mildred's Cottage Gourmet in Micanopy, Florida, owners Russell and Nancy Baum relocated the restaurant to Gainesville in 1998. The restaurant is named after the character played by Joan Crawford in Mildred Pierce.

In 2020, during the COVID-19 pandemic, the owners of the restaurant worked with local advocacy groups to donate food and deliver meals. Later that year, they distributed over 700 free Thanksgiving meals to local families in need. They also adjusted the restaurant's seating arrangements to account for local indoor dining restrictions.

== Restaurant ==
Mildred's dishes often include regional specialties such as tripletail. Sides include North Florida okra, chestnut, turnip, melon and persimmon. Wine dinners have been offered.

=== New Deal Cafe ===
The owners of Mildred's Big City Food also run a casual restaurant in the same building, right next door to Mildred's. Similar to Mildred's, the New Deal Cafe uses locally sourced ingredients, including beef from the University of Florida, but instead focuses on more fast casual menu items like hamburgers.
