= My Life and My Films =

1974 memoir by Jean Renoir

- Author: Jean Renoir
- Original title: Ma vie et mes films
- Language: French
- Genre: memoir
- Publisher: Flammarion
- Publication date: 1974
- Publication place: France
- English publication date: 1974
- Pages: 272
- ISBN: 9782080607171

My Life and My Films (French: Ma vie et mes films) is a 1974 memoir by the French filmmaker Jean Renoir. Renoir tells anecdotes from his life, covering subjects such as the respect for natural unity he was imprinted with in childhood, his time in World War I, his career in French cinema with many commercial failures, his family life, and his exile during World War II and work in Hollywood.
