= The Southerner (film) =

1945 film by Jean Renoir

- Theatrical release poster
- Directed by: Jean Renoir
- Screenplay by: Hugo Butler; Jean Renoir
- Based on: Hold Autumn in Your Hand; 1941 novel by George Sessions Perry
- Produced by: Robert Hakim; David L. Loew
- Starring: Zachary Scott; Betty Field; J. Carrol Naish; Beulah Bondi; Percy Kilbride
- Cinematography: Lucien N. Andriot
- Edited by: Gregg C. Tallas
- Music by: Werner Janssen
- Production companies: Loew-Hakim, Inc.
- Distributed by: United Artists
- Release date: May 18, 1945
- Running time: 92 minutes
- Country: United States
- Language: English
- Budget: $750,000

The Southerner (1945) by Jean Renoir

The Southerner is a 1945 American drama film directed by Jean Renoir and based on the 1941 novel Hold Autumn in Your Hand by George Sessions Perry. The film received Oscar nominations for Best Director (the only Oscar nomination Renoir received), Original Music Score, and Sound. Renoir was named Best Director by the National Board of Review, which also named the film the third best of 1945. The film portrays the hardships of a poor family struggling to establish a cotton farm in Texas in the early 1940s.

== Plot ==
Texas sharecropper, Sam Tucker, is picking cotton alongside his wife Nona and his elderly Uncle Pete. Pete suddenly collapses due to the extreme heat and to what he blames as "my darned old heart". Before he dies, he tells his nephew, "Work for yourself; grow your own crops." Sam heeds his uncle's advice, so Nona, their children Daisy and Jot, "Granny", and he leave the migrant camp and set out to work a vacant 68-acre tenant farm with little more than two mules, a second-hand plow, and some cotton seed and fertilizer. The land the family leases includes only a decaying shack and a dry well. In immediate need of drinking water, Sam visits a gruff neighboring farmer, Henry Devers, who reluctantly allows the Tuckers to share water from his well.

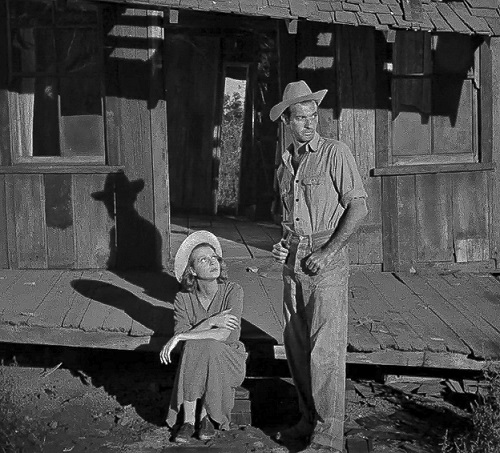
Cinematographer Lucien Andriot used low-level soundstage lighting to create dramatic shadows for the Tuckers' arrival at the farm.

Sam and his family nearly freeze and starve during their first winter on the farm, surviving largely on a limited diet of opossums, raccoons, and other small game that he is able to shoot. As spring arrives, Jot falls ill with "spring sickness". The town doctor informs Nona that the boy needs more diverse, vitamin-enriched foods, including vegetables, fruits, and milk to survive. The Tuckers immediately plant a garden, but its produce will take time to mature. Daily servings of milk would provide the suffering Jot with some timely relief, but the family cannot afford to buy or even rent a cow.

Sam's friend Tim offers to help get him a factory job that pays the attractive wage of seven dollars a day, but Sam remains determined to succeed as a farmer. Soon, the family's prayers are answered when Harmie, who owns the local general store, and Tim arrive in Harmie's flatbed truck with a milk cow, which young Daisy names "Uncle Walter". The family's cotton crop and the much-needed vegetable garden they planted finally begin to flourish. Meanwhile, the embittered Devers and his strange nephew Finley plot to ruin the Tuckers so Devers can buy the tenant farm for a cheaper price from its owner.

After Finley destroys the Tuckers' garden, Sam confronts Devers at his farm. There, Devers, armed with a knife, declares he will no longer share his well water, whereupon the two men have a near-deadly fight. Sam leaves and Devers gets a rifle and follows him. Soon, he finds Sam at the nearby river pulling in a fishing line on which he has hooked "Lead Pencil," an enormous catfish that Devers has been trying to catch for years. In return for the fish and the bragging rights that he was the one who caught it, Devers agrees to give Sam his garden and allow him continued access to his well, a deal that effectively puts an end to the trouble between the two families.

This location shot with actors (left to right) Naish, Scott, and Lloyd illustrates Androit's use of early- and late-day sunlight to maintain stark shadowing effects.

Harmie now marries Sam's mother, and a party is held at his general store to celebrate the wedding. Life at last seems to offer true promise for the Tuckers on that joyful occasion. Unfortunately, a violent rainstorm rolls in as the party is ending. The next day, the family returns to their farm, where heavy winds and flooding have ruined their entire cotton crop and ravaged their home. Sam, stunned by the sudden devastation, lets Tim accompany him as he searches for the family's missing cow, which they find alive but struggling in the swollen river. Tim nearly drowns in the deep water, but Sam rescues him. After pulling his friend to safety, Sam tells him that he is giving up farming and is now willing to take a factory job. Upon returning to the battered farm, though, he reconsiders his decision after he sees the resilience of his wife and grandmother, who are busy cleaning up what remains of the house and professing their resolve to start over again. The film ends with Sam and Nona, months after the flood, standing together in a freshly plowed field preparing for a new season and a new crop.

== Cast ==
- Zachary Scott as Sam Tucker
- Betty Field as Nona Tucker
- J. Carrol Naish as Henry Devers
- Beulah Bondi as Granny Tucker
- Percy Kilbride as Harmie
- Charles Kemper as Tim
- Blanche Yurka as Mama Tucker
- Norman Lloyd as Finley
- Estelle Taylor as Lizzie
- Paul Harvey as Ruston
- Noreen Nash as Becky Devers
- Jack Norworth as Dr. White
- Nestor Paiva as the bartender
- Paul E. Burns as Uncle Pete Tucker
- Jay Gilpin as Jot Tucker
- Jean Vanderwilt as Daisy Tucker

== Production ==
The Southerner was the fourth of six films that Jean Renoir directed while living in the United States during the 1940s. It was also the first of his independent Hollywood productions. Renoir's other "American" films are Swamp Water (1941), This Land Is Mine (1943), The Amazing Mrs. Holliday (1943), The Diary of a Chambermaid (1946), and The Woman on the Beach (1947). The Southerner, however, is now regarded by some reviewers and film historians to be his "Hollywood masterpiece" and generally recognized as the French director's "most American" film with regard to its content, structure, and overall presentation.

Contemporary news items in Hollywood reported that Joel McCrea and his wife Frances Dee were set to play the lead roles of Sam and Nona Tucker in The Southerner, but the couple left the project in pre-production out of McCrea's dissatisfaction with the script and his "creative differences" with Renoir. The roles then went to Zachary Scott and Betty Field. Although Scott did not possess McCrea's "star power" as a leading man and had relatively little experience in feature films, he did have one distinct advantage in preparing to portray Sam Tucker; he was a native of Texas, the setting for The Southerner.

Robert Aldrich, at age 26, was the assistant director on The Southerner, which was filmed at various locations in California, including the Arthur Ranch in the San Fernando Valley, Hotchkiss Ranch in Firebaugh, California, at RKO Pictures' movie ranch near Encino, in Malibu, at sites along the banks of the San Joaquin River, and in cotton fields near the town of Madera, about 240 miles northwest of Hollywood. The flood depicted in the production was created with water supplied from the Friant Dam and was shot where Millerton Lake is located today.

== Critical reception ==
In its May 2, 1945 issue, the widely read trade paper Variety recounts the despair fostered by the film's generally bleak tone but praises the performances of the film's stars and principal supporting cast:

"The Southerner" creates too little hope for a solution to the difficulties of farm workers who constantly look forward to the day when they can settle forever their existence of poverty with a long-sought harvest—a harvest that invariably never comes...Zachary Scott and Betty Field give fine performances, as do Beulah Bondi, the grandmother, Percy Kilbride, Charles Kemper and J. Carrol Naish.

Bosley Crowther, the film critic for The New York Times, liked the film and in 1945 wrote, "The Southerner may not be an 'entertainment' in the rigid Hollywood sense and it may have some flaws, but it is, nevertheless, a rich, unusual and sensitive delineation of a segment of the American scene well worth filming and seeing."

James Agee, among the most influential writers and film critics in the United States during the 1940s, admired several aspects of The Southerner, including the "sense of tactile reality" that Renoir captured in the film's general surroundings. For Agee, however, that sense of reality ended with the dialogue and attempted southern accents used in much of the film, which he deemed wholly unrealistic, as were in his view the actors' mannerisms and overall behavior on screen. The film, Agee contended, essentially "rang false", for it neither accurately portrayed the South's basic character nor the people who inhabited its rural subculture. A native of Tennessee, Agee was very knowledgeable about the South and in particular about tenant farmers and "croppers". In fact, he had first-hand experience observing the day-to-day challenges facing poor cotton farmers. He had lived for two months in Alabama with sharecroppers in the summer of 1936 and had recorded in great detail their families' troubled histories and meager existence at the time. Later that written record, accompanied by the photographs of Walker Evans, formed the highly acclaimed book Let Us Now Praise Famous Men, which was published just four years prior to the release of The Southerner.

== Controversy ==
The release of The Southerner in 1945 provoked intense negative reactions in various locations throughout the Southern United States. In spite of Sam Tucker's portrayal as an honest, hard-working, highly devoted family man in the film, some people in the American South strongly objected to The Southerner due to what they viewed as the film's "sordid depiction of life in the Southern states." The film was even banned from being shown in Tennessee by Lloyd T. Binford, who for nearly three decades served as head of the Memphis Board of Censors and whose influence in that position extended to review boards and movie theaters across that state. Outside of Tennessee, Binford by the 1940s had already established a reputation in Hollywood and nationally as "the toughest censor in America". Disgusted by The Southerner, he condemned the film as a "slur against Southern farmers" and for its characters being portrayed as nothing more than "'common, lowdown, ignorant white trash'". The Ku Klux Klan also condemned Renoir's film and advocated boycotting it at theaters elsewhere in the South. Yet, condemnation of The Southerner was by no means universal in the region. The United Daughters of the Confederacy was one of its supporters. The organization endorsed the film and complimented how its lead characters exemplified the South's best attributes of "'courage, stout-heartedness and love of our land'".

The regionalized title of The Southerner contributed to the film's controversy, a title that was being criticized by reviewers and influential movie promoters well before the film started to reach theaters in August 1945. The film-industry trade magazine Boxoffice, in its issue of May 5, 1945, cautioned theater owners that although The Southerner was an "outstanding picture", it was hampered by "an inept title" and by "a cast of questionable drawing power." One of the alternate titles considered for The Southerner by its producers and its distributor United Artists was The Tuckers of Texas.

== Promotion ==
In the 1940s the film industry's weekly trade magazine Boxoffice provided news and advertisements of special interest to theater owners. It also provided film reviews, reports about the public's response to new releases, and a "Showmandizer Section". That latter section gave "exploitips" on what publicity methods theaters could employ to attract more ticket-buyers. With regard to promoting The Southerner in 1945, Boxoffice furnished to theaters a card-sized reference that contained the following "Selling Angles" for the film:

Obtain bookstore tieups on George Session[s] Perry's novel "Hold Autumn in Your Hand," from which the picture was adapted. Get cooperation of 4H Clubs, the Grange and similar organizations in endorsing and publicizing this film. Window hookups with farm supply stores and feed shops—with live exhibits if possible, such as baby chicks, suckling pigs, etc.—should prove advantageous. Play up angling [fishing] angle: offer ticket prizes for largest fish caught, or biggest whopper [exaggerated fishing story] told.

The recommended "angle" offered by Boxoffice to attract even fishing enthusiasts to The Southerner relates to scenes in the film involving a catfish so large that it has "chin whiskers like lead pencils". Later in the story, when Sam Tucker actually catches "Lead Pencil", its huge size proves that Finley's earlier description or suspected "whopper" about the fish was no exaggeration. Boxoffice also gave theater owners "catchlines" or promotional phrases to use on their marquees and to send to newspapers and local radio stations to publicize The Southerner. In addition to "There Were Two Loves in His [Sam Tucker's] Life—His Family and His Farm", one other catchline given by Boxoffice to exploit the fishing angle, though misleading, was "Things Went From Bad to Pieces . . . Until Fisherman's Luck Changed an Enemy Into a Friend".

== Awards ==
Wins

- National Board of Review: NBR Award, Best Director, Jean Renoir, also Top Ten Film; 1945.
- Venice Film Festival: Best Feature Film, 1946.

Nominations

- Academy Awards: Oscar, Best Director, Jean Renoir; Best Music, Scoring of a Dramatic or Comedy Picture, Werner Janssen; Best Sound, Recording Jack Whitney (Sound Services Inc); 1946.
