= Alain Renoir =

French-American writer

Alain Renoir (October 31, 1921 – December 12, 2008) was a French-American literary critic and professor of Medieval literature, son of the filmmaker Jean Renoir and actress Catherine Hessling, and grandson of the impressionist painter Pierre-Auguste Renoir.

Renoir was born in Cagnes-sur-Mer, the only child of Jean Renoir. As a teenager, he worked in a few of his father's films, including House Party (1936), and as an assistant cameraman on The Human Beast (1938) and The Rules of the Game (1939). In 1942, after serving time in the French Army, he joined his father in Los Angeles. His father encouraged him to fight for his new country, and so he enlisted in the American Army and served in combat in the Pacific.

After the war, he studied English and comparative literature at the University of California Santa Barbara, eventually earning his doctorate from Harvard University, where he studied under Francis Peabody Magoun. It was at Harvard that he was introduced to the work of Milman Parry and Albert Lord on the oral-formulaic theory of epic poetry, and he went on to become a passionate proponent of this theory throughout most of his critical works, culminating in his final publication (and sole book), A Key to Old Poems: The Oral-Formulaic Approach to the Interpretation of West-Germanic Verse (Penn State University Press, 1990)

In 1956, Renoir became a professor of the Department of English at the University of California, Berkeley, the institution where he was to remain for the rest of his career. In 1966, he founded the Department of Comparative Literature but returned to the Department of English some dozen years later. He was considered a leading scholar of medieval, and particularly, Old English, literature, and published many articles on Beowulf and other Old and Middle English poetry. In 1992, the oral-formulaic scholar John Miles Foley honored Renoir with the festschrift, De Gustibus: Essays for Alain Renoir.

After retiring from UC Berkeley in 1988, Renoir spent his last years running a small sustainable farm in north central California, doing much of the work himself.

With his wife, Jane, he had three children, John, Peter, and Anne.
