= Jean Renoir =

French filmmaker (1894–1979)

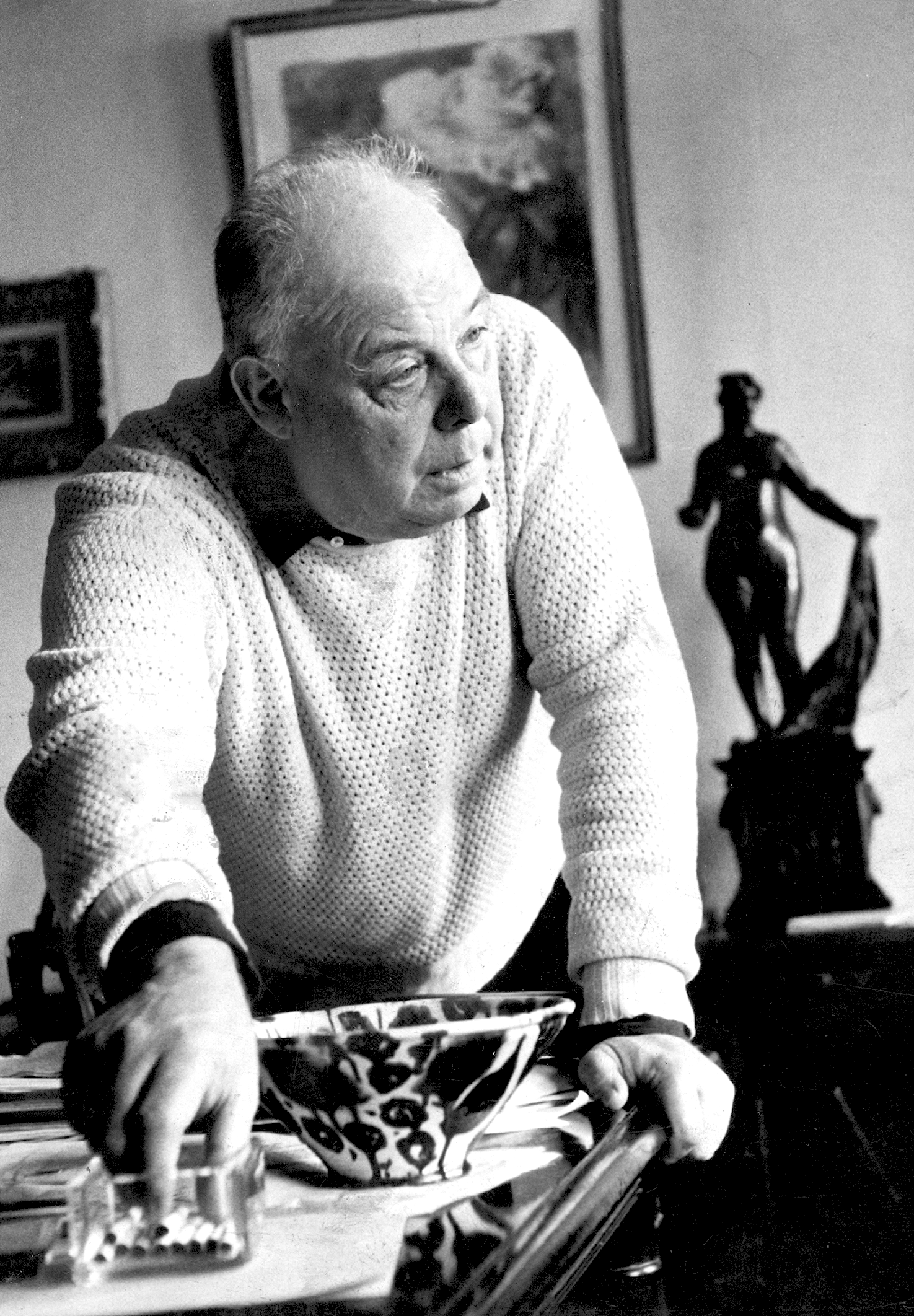
- Renoir in 1959
- Born: 15 September 1894; Paris, France
- Died: 12 February 1979 (aged 84); Beverly Hills, California, U.S.
- Occupations: Film director; screenwriter; actor; producer; author
- Years active: 1924–1978
- Notable work: La Grande Illusion; The Rules of the Game; The Southerner; The River; The Golden Coach; French Cancan
- Spouses: Catherine Hessling (m. 1920; div. 1943) Dido Freire (m. 1944)
- Partner: Marguerite Renoir (1932–1939)
- Relatives: Pierre-Auguste Renoir (father); Alain Renoir (son); Pierre Renoir (brother); Claude Renoir (nephew); Sophie Renoir (grand-niece)

Jean Renoir (French: [ʒɑ̃ ʁənwaʁ]; 15 September 1894 – 12 February 1979) was a French filmmaker, actor, producer and author. His La Grande Illusion (1937) and The Rules of the Game (1939) are often cited by critics as among the greatest films ever made. In 2002, he was ranked fourth on the BFI's Sight & Sound poll of the greatest directors. Among numerous honours accrued during his lifetime, he received a Lifetime Achievement Academy Award in 1975. Renoir was the son of the painter Pierre-Auguste Renoir and the uncle of the cinematographer Claude Renoir. With Claude, he made The River (1951), the first color film shot in India. A lifelong lover of theater, Renoir turned to the stage for The Golden Coach (1952) and French Cancan (1955). He was one of the first filmmakers to be known as an auteur; the critic Penelope Gilliatt said a Renoir shot could be identified "in a thousand miles of film."

Pauline Kael wrote that "At his greatest, Jean Renoir expresses the beauty in our common humanity—the desires and hopes, the absurdities and follies, that we all, to one degree or another, share." Per The New York Times: "The style that ran through Mr. Renoir's films — a mixture of tenderness, irony and Gallic insouciance‐was caught in a famous line from his 1939 masterpiece, The Rules of the Game. It was spoken by Octave, played by the director himself: 'You see, in this world, there is one awful thing, and that is that everyone has his reasons.'"

== Early life ==
The young Renoir with Gabrielle Renard in a painting by his father Pierre-Auguste Renoir (1895–96)

Renoir was born in the Montmartre district of Paris, France. He was the second son of Aline (née Charigot) Renoir and Pierre-Auguste Renoir, the Impressionist painter. His elder brother was Pierre Renoir, a French stage and film actor, and his younger brother Claude Renoir (1901–1969) had a brief career in the film industry, mostly assisting on a few of Jean's films. Jean Renoir was also the uncle of Claude Renoir (1913–1993), the son of Pierre, a cinematographer who worked with Jean Renoir on several of his films. He recalls that "I discovered Alexandre Dumas when I was about ten. I am still discovering him."

Renoir was largely raised by Gabrielle Renard, his nanny and his mother's cousin, with whom he developed a strong bond. Shortly before his birth, she had come to live with the Renoir family. She introduced the young boy to the Guignol puppet shows in Montmartre, which influenced his later film career. He wrote in his 1974 memoirs My Life and My Films, "She taught me to see the face behind the mask and the fraud behind the flourishes. She taught me to detest the cliché." Gabrielle was also fascinated by the new early motion pictures, and when Renoir was only a few years old she took him to see his first film.

As a child, Renoir moved to the south of France with his family. He and the rest of the Renoir family were the subjects of many of his father's paintings. His father's financial success ensured that the young Renoir was educated at fashionable boarding schools, from which, as he later wrote, he frequently ran away.

At the outbreak of World War I, Renoir was serving in the French cavalry. Later, after receiving a bullet in his leg, he served as a reconnaissance pilot. His leg injury left him with a permanent limp, but allowed him to develop his interest in the cinema, since he recuperated with his leg elevated while watching films, including the works of Charlie Chaplin, D.W. Griffith and others. After the war, Renoir followed his father's suggestion and tried making ceramic art, but he soon set that aside to make films in the attempt, he would later claim, to make his wife, Hessling, a star. He was particularly inspired by Erich von Stroheim's work.

== Career ==
=== Early years ===
In 1924, Renoir directed Une Vie Sans Joie or Catherine, the first of his nine silent films, most of which starred his first wife, Catherine Hessling, who was also his father's last model. At this stage, his films did not produce a return. Renoir gradually sold paintings inherited from his father to finance them. Hessling also starred in Nana shot in 1926 and the 1927 silent futuristic fantasy film Charleston Parade (Sur un air de Charleston) with the African American mime artist Johnny Hudgins.

=== International success in the 1930s ===
During the 1930s Renoir enjoyed great success as a filmmaker. In 1931 he directed his first sound films, On purge bébé (Baby's Laxative) and La Chienne (The Bitch). The following year he made Boudu Saved from Drowning (Boudu sauvé des eaux), a farcical sendup of the pretensions of a middle-class bookseller and his family, who meet with comic, and ultimately disastrous, results when they attempt to reform a vagrant played by Michel Simon. In 1934, he filmed an adaptation of Gustave Flaubert's Madame Bovary (1857). His 1935 film Toni, shot on locations with a nonprofessional cast, was later an influence on the French New Wave.

By the middle of the decade, Renoir was associated with the Popular Front. Several of his films, such as The Crime of Monsieur Lange (Le Crime de Monsieur Lange, 1935), Life Belongs to Us (1936) and La Marseillaise (1938), reflect the movement's politics.

In 1937, he made La Grande Illusion, one of his best-known films, starring Erich von Stroheim and Jean Gabin. A film on the theme of brotherhood, relating a series of escape attempts by French POWs during World War I, it was enormously successful. It was banned in Germany, and later in Italy, after having won the Best Artistic Ensemble award at the Venice Film Festival. It was the first foreign language film to receive a nomination for the Academy Award for Best Picture. In 1938, the Nazis disrupted a showing of La Grande Illusion. Renoir reflected, "This is a story that fills me with real pride."

He followed it with The Human Beast (La Bête Humaine) (1938), a film noir and tragedy based on the novel by Émile Zola and starring Gabin and Simone Simon. It too was a success.

In 1939, able to co-finance his own films, Renoir made The Rules of the Game (La Règle du Jeu), a satire on contemporary French society with an ensemble cast. Renoir played the character Octave, who serves to connect characters from different social strata. The film was his greatest commercial failure, met with derision by Parisian audiences at its premiere. He extensively reedited the work, but without success at the time.

A few weeks after the outbreak of World War II, the film was banned by the government. Renoir was a known pacifist and supporter of the French Communist Party, which made him suspect in the tense weeks before the war began. The ban was lifted briefly in 1940, but after the fall of France that June, it was banned again. Subsequently, the original negative of the film was destroyed in an Allied bombing raid. It was not until the 1950s that French film enthusiasts Jean Gaborit and Jacques Durand, with Renoir's cooperation, reconstructed a near-complete print of the film. Since that time, The Rules of the Game has been reappraised and has frequently appeared near the top of critics' polls of the best films ever made.

A week after the disastrous premiere of The Rules of the Game in July 1939, Renoir went to Rome with Karl Koch and Dido Freire, subsequently his second wife, to work on the script for a film version of Tosca. At the age of 45, he became a lieutenant in the French Army Film Service. He was sent back to Italy, to teach film at the Centro Sperimentale di Cinematografia in Rome, and resume work on Tosca. The French government hoped this cultural exchange would help maintain friendly relations with Italy, which had not yet entered the war. He abandoned the project to return to France and make himself available for military service in August 1939.

=== Hollywood ===
After Germany invaded France in May 1940, Renoir fled to the United States with Dido Freire. "Dido and I travelled by sea from Marseille to Algeria, Morocco and Lisbon... At Lisbon we got places on an American ship, and I was delighted to find myself sharing a cabin with none other than the writer Saint-Exupéry." In Hollywood, Renoir had difficulty finding projects that suited him. His first American film, Swamp Water (1941), was a drama starring Dana Andrews and Walter Brennan. His second, The Amazing Mrs. Holliday, suffered numerous production difficulties, and Renoir was eventually replaced as the credited director by the film's producer, Bruce Manning. He co-produced and directed an anti-Nazi film set in France, This Land Is Mine (1943), starring Maureen O'Hara and Charles Laughton, as well as a short documentary, Salute to France, co-directed with Garson Kanin. Renoir's greatest American success came in 1945, when he made The Southerner (1945) and was nominated for an Academy Award for Directing.

Diary of a Chambermaid (1946) is an adaptation of the Octave Mirbeau novel, Le Journal d'une femme de chambre, starring Paulette Goddard and Burgess Meredith. His The Woman on the Beach (1947), starring Joan Bennett and Robert Ryan, was heavily reshot and reedited after it fared poorly among preview audiences in California. Both films were poorly received; they were the last films Renoir made in America. At this time, Renoir became a naturalized citizen of the United States.

=== Post-Hollywood ===
In 1949 Renoir traveled to India to shoot The River (1951), his first color film. Based on the novel of the same name by Rumer Godden, the film is both a meditation on human beings' relationship with nature and a coming of age story of three young girls in colonial India. The film won the International Prize at the Venice Film Festival in 1951.

After returning to work in Europe, Renoir made a trilogy of color musical comedies on the subjects of theater, politics and commerce: Le Carrosse d'or (The Golden Coach, 1953) with Anna Magnani; French Cancan (1954) with Jean Gabin and María Félix; and Eléna et les hommes (Elena and Her Men, 1956) with Ingrid Bergman and Jean Marais. During the same period Renoir produced Clifford Odets' play The Big Knife in Paris. He also wrote his own play, Orvet, and produced it in Paris featuring Leslie Caron.

Renoir made his next films with techniques adapted from live television. Le Déjeuner sur l'herbe (Picnic on the Grass, 1959), starring Paul Meurisse and Catherine Rouvel, was filmed on the grounds of Pierre-Auguste Renoir's home in Cagnes-sur-Mer, and Le Testament du docteur Cordelier (The Testament of Doctor Cordelier, also 1959), starring Jean-Louis Barrault, was made in the streets of Paris and its suburbs.

Renoir's penultimate film, Le Caporal épinglé (The Elusive Corporal, 1962), with Jean-Pierre Cassel and Claude Brasseur, is set among French POWs during their internment in labor camps by the Nazis during World War II. The film explores the twin human needs for freedom, on the one hand, and emotional and economic security, on the other.

Renoir's loving memoir of his father, Renoir, My Father (1962) describes the profound influence his father had on him and his work. As funds for his film projects were becoming harder to obtain, Renoir continued to write screenplays for income. He published a novel, The Notebooks of Captain Georges, in 1966. Captain Georges is the nostalgic account of a wealthy young man's sentimental education and love for a peasant girl, a theme also explored earlier in his films Diary of a Chambermaid and Picnic on the Grass.

=== Last years ===
Renoir's last film is Le Petit théâtre de Jean Renoir (The Little Theatre of Jean Renoir), released in 1970. It is a series of three short films made in a variety of styles. It is, in many ways, one of his most challenging, avant-garde and unconventional works.

Unable to obtain financing for his films and suffering declining health, Renoir spent his last years receiving friends at his home in Beverly Hills, and writing novels and his memoirs.

In 1973 Renoir was preparing a production of his stage play, Carola, with Leslie Caron and Mel Ferrer when he fell ill and was unable to direct. The producer Norman Lloyd, a friend and actor in The Southerner, took over the direction of the play. It was broadcast in the series program Hollywood Television Theater on WNET, Channel 13, New York on 3 February 1973.

Renoir's memoir, My Life and My Films, was published in 1974. He wrote of the influence exercised by Gabrielle Renard, his nanny and his mother's cousin, with whom he developed a mutual lifelong bond. He concluded his memoirs with the words he had often spoken as a child, "Wait for me, Gabrielle."

In 1975 Renoir received a lifetime Academy Award for his contribution to the motion picture industry. That same year a retrospective of his work was shown at the National Film Theatre in London. Also in 1975, the government of France elevated him to the rank of commander in the Légion d'honneur.

== Personal life and death ==
Renoir was married to Catherine Hessling, an actress and model. After many years, they divorced. His second wife was Dido Freire.

Renoir's son Alain Renoir (1921–2008) became a professor of English and comparative literature at the University of California, Berkeley and a scholar of medieval English literature.

Jean Renoir died in Beverly Hills, California, on 12 February 1979 of a heart attack. His body was returned to France and buried beside his family in the cemetery at Essoyes, France.

== Legacy ==
"His work unfolds as if he had devoted his most brilliant moments to fleeing the masterpiece, to escape any notion of the definite and the fixed, so as to create a semi-improvisation, a deliberately 'open' work that each viewer can complete for himself, comment on as it suits him, approach from any side."

— François Truffaut

On his death, fellow director and friend Orson Welles wrote "Jean Renoir: The Greatest of All Directors" in the Los Angeles Times. Renoir's films have influenced many other directors, including Éric Rohmer, Jean-Marie Straub and Danièle Huillet, Peter Bogdanovich, François Truffaut, Robert Altman, Errol Morris Martin Scorsese and Mike Leigh. Truffaut named his production company "Les Films du Carrosse" after Renoir's The Golden Coach (Le Carrosse d'Or). Several of Renoir's crew members, including Satyajit Ray, Luchino Visconti, Robert Aldrich and Jacques Becker, would go on to become highly acclaimed directors in their own right. He was an influence on the French New Wave, and his memoir is dedicated "to those film-makers who are known to the public as the 'New Wave' and whose preoccupations are mine." Altman said "I learned the rules of the game from The Rules of the Game."

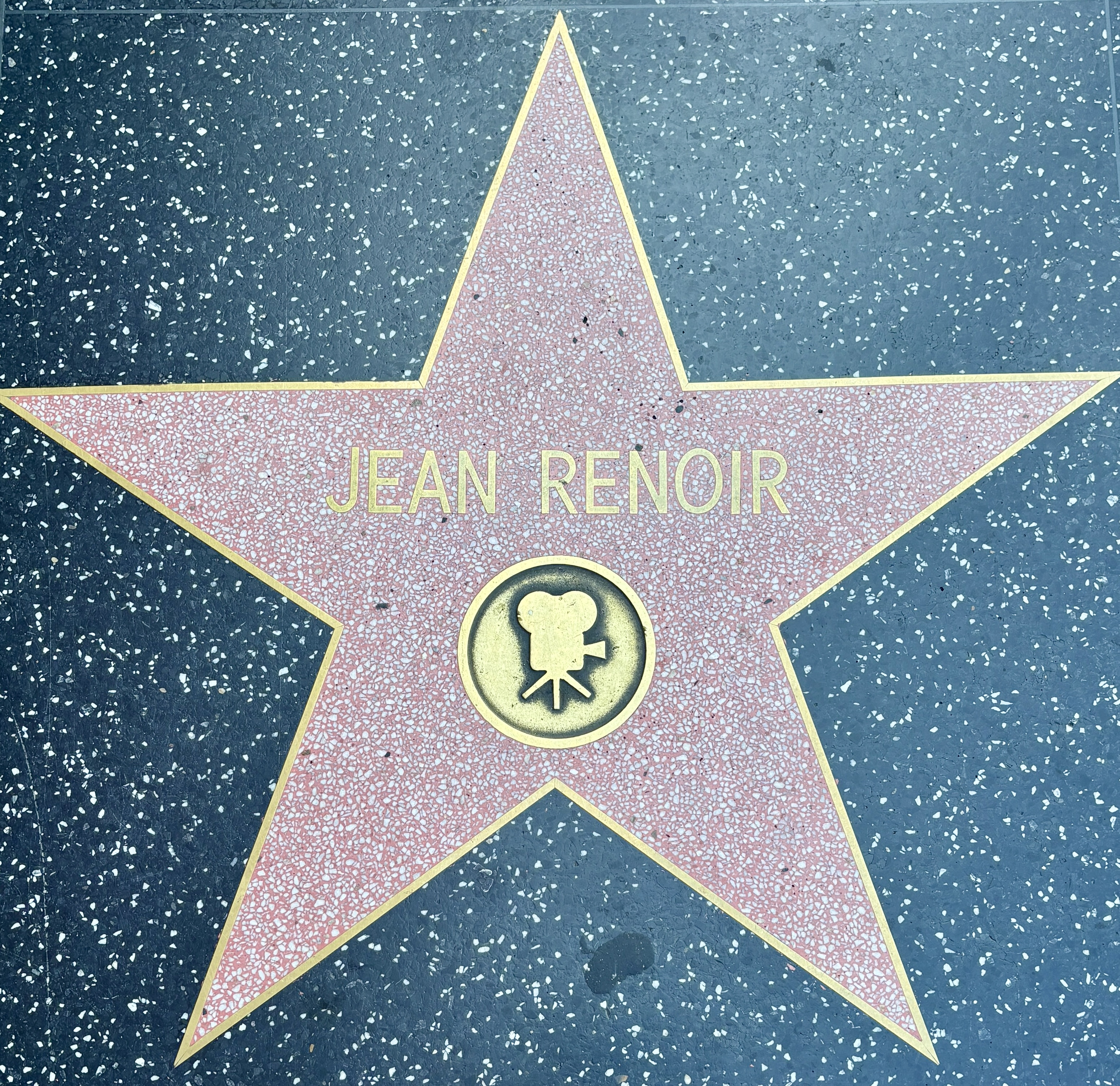
Hollywood Walk of Fame star

Renoir has a star on the Hollywood Walk of Fame at 6212 Hollywood Blvd. Several of his ceramics were collected by Albert Barnes, who was a major patron and collector of Renoir's father. These can be found on display beneath Pierre-Auguste Renoir's paintings at the Barnes Foundation in Philadelphia.

According to David Thomson, Renoir was "the model of humanist cinema, an informal genre that included Frank Capra, Vittorio De Sica, Satyajit Ray, Yasujirō Ozu or even Charlie Chaplin." In The New Biographical Dictionary of Film, he writes: "Renoir asks us to see the variety and muddle of life without settling for one interpretation. He is the greatest of directors, he justifies cinema ... In Renoir, My Father and in his own autobiography, My Life and My Films, Jean clearly adopts his father's wish to float on life like a cork. That same stream carries Boudu away to freedom, wrinkles with pain at the end of Partie de campagne, overflows and engenders precarious existence in The Southerner, and is meaning itself in The River:

The river runs, the round world spins

Dawn and lamplight, midnight, noon.

Sun follows day, night stars and moon.

The day ends, the end begins."

== Awards ==
- Chevalier de la Légion d'honneur, 1936
- Selznick Golden Laurel Award for lifetime work, Brazilian Film Festival, Rio de Janeiro, 1958
- Prix Charles Blanc, Académie française, for Renoir, My Father, biography of father, 1963
- Honorary Doctorate in Fine Arts, University of California, Berkeley, 1963
- Fellow of the American Academy of Arts and Sciences, 1964
- Osella d'Oro as a master of the cinema, Venice Festival, 1968
- Honorary Doctorate of Fine Arts, Royal College of Art, London, 1971
- Honorary Academy Award for Career Accomplishment, 1974
- Special Award, National Society of Film Critics, 1975
- Commandeur de la Légion d'honneur, 1975
- Prix Goncourt de la Biographie, 2013

== Bibliography ==
=== Renoir's writings ===
- 1955: Orvet, Paris: Gallimard, play.
- 1960: Carola, play. Reworked as a screenplay and published in "L'Avant-Scène du Théâtre" no. 597, 1 November 1976.
- 1962: Renoir, Paris: Hachette (Renoir, My Father), biography.
- 1966: Les Cahiers du Capitaine Georges, Paris: Gallimard (The Notebooks of Captain Georges), novel.
- 1974: Ma Vie et mes Films, Paris: Flammarion (My Life and My Films), autobiography.
- 1974: Écrits 1926–1971 (Claude Gauteur, ed.), Paris: Pierre Belfond, writings.
- 1978: Le Coeur à l'aise, Paris: Flammarion, novel.
- 1978 Julienne et son amour; suivi d'En avant Rosalie!, Paris: Henri Veyrier, screenplays.
- 1979: Le crime de l'Anglais, Paris: Flammarion, novel.
- 1980: Geneviève, Paris: Flammarion, novel.

=== Writings featuring Renoir ===
- 1979: Jean Renoir: Entretiens et propos (Jean Narboni, ed.), Paris: Éditions de l'étoile/Cahiers du Cinéma, interviews and remarks.
- 1981: Œuvres de cinéma inédités (Claude Gauteur, ed.), Paris: Gallimard, synopses and treatments.
- 1984: Lettres d'Amérique (Dido Renoir & Alexander Sesonske, eds.), Paris: Presses de la Renaissance ISBN 2-85616-287-8, correspondence.
- 1989: Renoir on Renoir: Interviews, Essays, and Remarks (Carol Volk, tr.), Cambridge: Cambridge University Press.
- 1994: Jean Renoir: Letters (David Thompson and Lorraine LoBianco, eds.), London: Faber & Faber, correspondence.
- 2005: Jean Renoir: Interviews (Bert Cardullo, ed.), Jackson, MS: Mississippi University Press, interviews.
