= Joel Spector =

American theater producer and television executive

- Occupation: producer

Joel Max Spector was an American theater producer and television executive active during the mid-20th century. He is best known for his contributions to Broadway productions and early television programming.

== Broadway productions ==
Spector often collaborated with the Plumstead Theatre Society, Inc. His Broadway credits include:

- The Barrier (1950), a musical drama for which Spector served as a producer.
- Make a Million (1958), a play produced by Spector that ran from October 23, 1958, to July 18, 1959.
- Let It Ride! (1961), a musical comedy produced by Spector, which opened on October 12, 1961.
- First Monday in October (1978), a play produced by the Plumstead Theatre Society with Spector as one of the producers..

== Television work ==
Spector is credited as a producer for several television programs, including:

- Confidential for Women (1966), a television program focusing on women's issues.
- The Alcoa Hour (1955), an anthology drama series that aired live on NBC.
- This Is Your Life (1955), a biographical television series.
- The Stingiest Man in Town (1956), a musical adaptation of Charles Dickens's A Christmas Carol, with music by Fred Spielman and lyrics by Janice Torre. It was the first musical version of A Christmas Carol to be televised in color.
