= Waterloo Bridge (1940 film) =

1940 film by Mervyn LeRoy

- Original film poster
- Directed by: Mervyn LeRoy
- Written by: S. N. Behrman; Hans Rameau; George Froeschel
- Based on: Waterloo Bridge a 1930 play by Robert E. Sherwood
- Produced by: Sidney Franklin
- Starring: Vivien Leigh; Robert Taylor; Lucile Watson; Virginia Field; Maria Ouspenskaya; C. Aubrey Smith
- Cinematography: Joseph Ruttenberg
- Edited by: George Boemler
- Music by: Herbert Stothart
- Production company: Metro-Goldwyn-Mayer
- Distributed by: Loew's Inc.
- Release date: May 17, 1940
- Running time: 108 minutes
- Country: United States
- Language: English
- Budget: $1.2 million
- Box office: $2.5 million

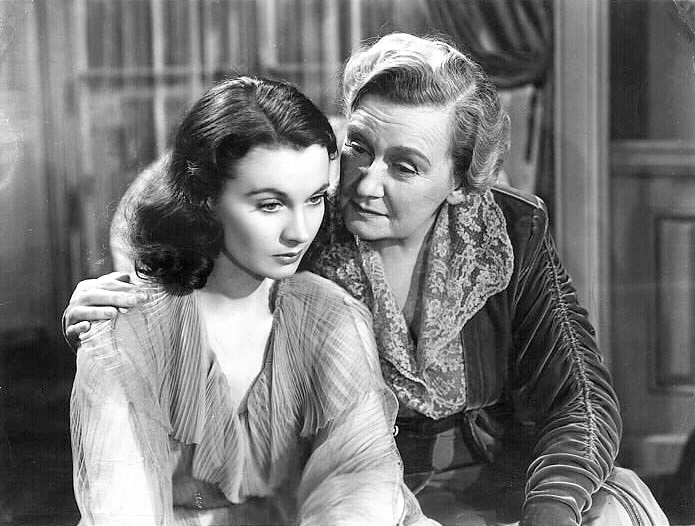
Vivien Leigh and Lucile Watson

Waterloo Bridge is a 1940 American drama film as well as the remake of the 1931 pre-Code film of the same name, adapted by S. N. Behrman, Hans Rameau and George Froeschel, from the 1930 play Waterloo Bridge by Robert E. Sherwood. In an extended flashback narration, it recounts the story of a dancer and an army captain who meet by chance on Waterloo Bridge in London. The film was made by Metro-Goldwyn-Mayer, directed by Mervyn LeRoy and produced by Sidney Franklin and Mervyn LeRoy. The music is by Herbert Stothart and cinematography by Joseph Ruttenberg.

The film stars Robert Taylor and Vivien Leigh. It was a success at the box office and nominated for two Academy Awards: Best Music for Herbert Stothart and Best Cinematography. It was also considered a personal favorite by both Leigh and Taylor.

In 1956, it was remade again as Gaby, which stars Leslie Caron and John Kerr.

== Plot ==
After Britain's declaration of war in World War II, army colonel Roy Cronin is driven to London's Waterloo station on his way to France, and briefly stops at Waterloo Bridge. He gazes at a good-luck charm and reminisces about the love of his life.

Early in World War I, Roy, a captain in the Rendleshire Fusiliers is preparing to head to the front when he meets Myra, a ballerina, while crossing Waterloo Bridge during an air raid. The pair strike up an immediate rapport while taking shelter. Myra invites Roy to attend that evening's ballet performance and an enamored Roy ignores an obligatory dinner with his colonel. Roy sends a note to Myra to join him after the performance, but the note is intercepted by the mistress of the ballet troupe, the tyrannical Madame Olga, who admonishes any distraction from the ballet. Nevertheless, Roy and Myra meet at a romantic night spot. Roy has to travel to the front immediately and proposes marriage, which Myra accepts, but they are unable to have it officiated before Roy is forced to depart that evening. Myra chooses to see him off at the train station as a gesture of her commitment, knowing it will make her late for the ballet. Madame Olga dismisses her from the troupe along with fellow dancer Kitty for defending Myra.

The two young women share a small flat. Unable to find work, they soon become penniless. Myra goes to meet Roy's mother, Lady Margaret Cronin, for tea. While waiting for her arrival, Myra scans a newspaper is horrified to find Roy listed among the war dead. She is unable to disclose the dreadful news to Lady Margaret, who withdraws from the incoherent young woman. Myra is overcome with grief and faints. Kitty manages to cover their shared expenses by becoming a prostitute. Myra learns of her choice, and feeling that she has nothing left to lose, resorts to prostitution as well. A year passes.

While offering herself to soldiers on leave arriving at Waterloo Station, Myra sees Roy, who is alive and well. He had only been wounded and held as a prisoner of war. The reunion is joyous for Roy but bittersweet for Myra. The couple travel to the family estate in Scotland to visit a welcoming Lady Margaret. Myra is also accepted by Roy's charismatic uncle, the Duke, who inadvertently feeds her guilt by expressing his faith that she could never dishonour the family. To eliminate the possibility of a scandal, Myra decides to break off the engagement. She goes to inform Lady Margaret, who says she has forgiven Myra after learning that her former manic behavior had been due to Roy's presumed death, further regreting that she been unable to find Myra and support her. Myra discloses her secret, prompting Lady Margaret to ask her to wait until morning to make a decision. Leaving Roy a goodbye note, Myra returns quietly to London. Roy and Kitty search for her, but as Roy learns the truth he realizes that he has already lost her. Myra returns to Waterloo Bridge, where she commits suicide by walking into the path of an oncoming truck.

== Cast ==
- Vivien Leigh as Myra Lester
- Robert Taylor as Roy Cronin
- Lucile Watson as Lady Margaret Cronin
- Virginia Field as Kitty Meredith
- Maria Ouspenskaya as Madame Olga Kirowa
- C. Aubrey Smith as The Duke
- Janet Shaw as Maureen
- Janet Waldo as Elsa
- Steffi Duna as Lydia
- Virginia Carroll as Sylvia
- Leda Nicova as Marie
- Florence Baker as Beatrice
- Margery Manning as Mary
- Frances MacInerney as Violet
- Eleanor Stewart as Grace
- Gilbert Emery as a colonel at the luncheon (uncredited)
- Halliwell Hobbes as the vicar at St. Matthews (uncredited)
- Harry Stubbs as the proprietor of a restaurant (uncredited)
- Martha Wentworth as the tart on the bridge at the end (uncredited)

== Production ==
MGM bought the 1931 version of Waterloo Bridge from Universal Studios in order to produce the remake. From its initial release, the 1931 film had been censored in major American cities because of objections to the portrayal of prostitution. The censorship was imposed first by local authorities, such as a Chicago police censorship board, before enforcement by the Hays Office in 1934 made it impossible to exhibit the film anywhere in the United States.

Prostitution is a subject that neither our Ordinance nor Commissioner Alcock permits us to leave in pictures whether for an adult or a general permit. It is a clear violation of all our standards and also, we had understood, a violation of the underlying purpose of the [Motion Picture Production] Code.

— Chicago police censorship board, 1931

Because of the Motion Picture Production Code, which had not been in effect when the 1931 film version was made, plot details of the 1940 version were significantly changed and somewhat sanitized. In the original play and film, based on Sherwood's personal experiences, both characters are Americans; Myra is an unemployed chorus girl who has turned to prostitution and Roy is a callow 19-year-old expatriate who does not realize how she makes money. However, in the 1940 version, both are British, Myra a promising ballerina in a prestigious dance company who becomes a prostitute only after believing that her sweetheart has been killed and Roy a mature officer of Scottish nobility. In the original film, Myra is accidentally killed after her situation with Roy has apparently been happily resolved; in the 1940 version, she commits suicide when her inner conflict becomes insurmountable. The flashback format of the 1940 version was a device added in acknowledgment of the recent onset of war when the script was written in 1939.

Waterloo Bridge capitalized on Leigh's success the previous year in Gone with the Wind. Taylor was eager to show audiences that he was more than the suave and youthful lover whom he had played in such films as Camille and Three Comrades. Leigh wanted Laurence Olivier for the role of Roy Cronin and was unhappy that Taylor had been cast in the part, although she had enjoyed him on the set of A Yank at Oxford. She wrote to her husband Leigh Holman: "Robert Taylor is the man in the picture, and as it was written for Larry, it's a typical piece of miscasting. I am afraid it will be a dreary job ..." Taylor later said of his performance: "It was the first time I really gave a performance that met the often unattainable standards I was always setting for myself." Of Leigh, Taylor said, "Miss Leigh was simply great in her role, and she made me look better." Of all her films, Leigh stated Waterloo Bridge was her favorite. Taylor also named the film as his personal favorite.

Ethel Griffies and Rita Carlisle (then Carlyle), cast respectively in the 1931 film as Myra's landlady and a woman on the bridge when they meet, appear in the 1940 version in similar roles.

== Reception and legacy ==
Waterloo Bridge opened in New York and shortly after in London to positive reviews.

In a contemporary review for The New York Times, critic Bosley Crowther was effusive in his praise for Vivien Leigh: "Let there be no doubt about it. Vivien Leigh is as fine an actress as we have on the screen today. Maybe even the finest, and that's a lot to say. Plenty of skeptics are still mumbling that her Scarlett O'Hara was a freak, that any one could have played it with such a wide-open field. We know all about them—and we know, too, about the unreconstructed dissidents. So this is an urgent hint that they ... see this remarkable Miss Leigh in her first picture since 'Gone With the Wind.' If they are not then convinced, we will cover ourself with a sack."

When the film was released in China in November 1940, it was enormously popular. As a result, the story became a standard of Shanghai opera and the song "Auld Lang Syne" became widely known in China.

The film was nominated by the American Film Institute for inclusion in its 2002 list AFI's 100 Years...100 Passions.

=== Box office ===
According to MGM records, the film earned $1,250,000 in the U.S. and Canada and $1,217,000 elsewhere, resulting in a profit of $491,000.

=== Radio adaptations ===
Waterloo Bridge was dramatized as a half-hour radio play on two broadcasts of The Screen Guild Theater, the first on January 12, 1941, with Brian Aherne and Joan Fontaine and the second on September 9, 1946, with Barbara Stanwyck and Robert Taylor. It was also presented as a half-hour broadcast of Screen Directors Playhouse on September 28, 1951, with Norma Shearer.

== See also ==
- Auld Lang Syne
- Shanghai Blues
- The Crossing (2014 film)
