= The Stingiest Man in Town =

1978 animated Christmas television special

- Title page
- Genre: Christmas Family-musical
- Written by: Charles Dickens; Romeo Muller
- Directed by: Katsuhisa Yamada, Jules Bass, Arthur Rankin Jr.
- Music by: Fred Spielman, Janice Torre

Production
- Producers: Arthur Rankin, Jr. Jules Bass
- Running time: 51 minutes
- Production companies: Rankin/Bass Productions; Topcraft Limited Company

Original release
- Network: NBC
- Release: December 23, 1978

Related
- Rudolph the Red-Nosed Reindeer (1964) (Note: Recurring characters include Rudolph (voiced by Billie Mae Richards), Santa Claus (voiced by Stan Francis), and Mrs. Claus (voiced by Peg Dixon) in this special. Various actors portray the other reindeer.); Frosty the Snowman (1969) (Note: Recurring characters include Frosty the Snowman (voiced by Jackie Vernon), Santa (voiced by Paul Frees), and Professor Hinkle Tinkerton (voiced by Billy De Wolfe) in this special. Santa's reindeer also feature.); Santa Claus Is Comin' to Town (1970) (Note: Recurring characters include Santa (voiced by Mickey Rooney), Mrs. Jessica Claus (voiced by Robie Lester), and S.D. Kluger (voiced by Fred Astaire) in this special. Rudolph and Santa's other reindeer also feature.); Here Comes Peter Cottontail (1971) (Note: Recurring characters include the Easter Bunny (voiced by Casey Kasem), and Santa (voiced by Frees) in this special. Santa's reindeer also feature.); 'Twas the Night Before Christmas (1974) (Note: Recurring characters in this special include Santa (voiced by Allen Swift), alongside his featured reindeer.); The Year Without a Santa Claus (1974) (Note: Recurring characters include Santa (voiced by Rooney), Mrs. Claus (voiced by Shirley Booth), Snow Miser (voiced by Dick Shawn), Heat Miser (voiced by George S. Irving), and Mother Nature (voiced by Rhoda Mann) in this special. Rudolph and Santa's other reindeer also feature.); The First Easter Rabbit (1976) (Note: Recurring characters include Easter Bunny (voiced by Robert Morse and Burl Ives), and Santa (voiced by Frees) in this special. Santa's reindeer also feature.); Frosty's Winter Wonderland (1976) (Note: Recurring characters include Frosty (voiced by Vernon), Mrs. Crystal Frosty (voiced by Shelley Winters), and Jack Frost (voiced by Frees) in this special.); Rudolph's Shiny New Year (1976) (Note: Recurring characters include Rudolph (voiced by Richards) and Santa (voiced by Frees) in this special. Santa's other reindeer also feature.); The Easter Bunny Is Comin' to Town (1977) (Note: Recurring characters include Easter Bunny (voiced by Skip Hinnant), and S.D. Kluger (voiced by Astaire) in this special.); Nestor, the Long-Eared Christmas Donkey (1977) (Note: Recurring characters in this special include Santa (voiced by Frees), alongside Rudolph and his other featured reindeer.); The Stingiest Man in Town (1978) (Note: Recurring characters in this special include Santa Claus during a scene which compares the Ghost of Christmas Present to him (both characters were voiced by Frees).); Jack Frost (1979) (Note: The recurring character is Jack Frost (voiced by Robert Morse) in this special.); Rudolph and Frosty's Christmas in July (1979) (Note: Recurring characters include Rudolph (voiced by Richards), Frosty (voiced by Vernon), Santa (voiced by Rooney), Mrs. Claus (voiced by Darlene Conley), Crystal (voiced by Winters), and Jack Frost (voiced by Frees) in this special. Santa's other reindeer also feature.); Pinocchio's Christmas (1980) (Note: The recurring characters in the special include Santa (voiced by Swift), alongside his featured reindeer.); Frosty Returns (1992) (Note: The recurring character is Frosty (voiced by John Goodman) in this special. Mother Nature is also referenced in the short.); Rudolph the Red-Nosed Reindeer and the Island of Misfit Toys (2001) (Note: Recurring characters include Rudolph (voiced by Kathleen Barr), Santa (voiced by Garry Chalk), and Mrs. Claus (also voiced by Barr) in this film. Santa's other reindeer, and various other characters from the 1964 original also feature.); The Legend of Frosty the Snowman (2005) (Note: Recurring characters include Frosty (voiced by Bill Fagerbakke), and Professor Tinkerton (voiced by Kath Soucie) in this special.); A Miser Brothers' Christmas (2008) (Note: Recurring characters include Snow Miser (voiced by Juan Chioran), Heat Miser (voiced by Irving), Santa (voiced by Rooney), Mrs. Claus (voiced by Catherine Disher), and Mother Earth (voiced by Patricia Hamilton) in this special. Santa's reindeer also feature.)

The Stingiest Man in Town is a 1978 animated Christmas musical television special based on Charles Dickens's 1843 novella A Christmas Carol. It was created by Arthur Rankin Jr. and Jules Bass, and features traditional animation rather than the stop motion animation most often used by the company. It was an animated remake of a long-unseen, but quite well received, live-action musical special (also called The Stingiest Man in Town) which had starred Basil Rathbone, Martyn Green and Vic Damone. The live-action version had been telecast on December 23, 1956, on the NBC anthology series The Alcoa Hour, and was released on DVD in 2011 by VAI. The animated remake first aired December 23, 1978, in the United States on NBC, and was telecast in Japan the next day.

== Plot ==
The Stingiest Man in Town is the tale of Ebenezer Scrooge, told through the perspective of the insect B.A.H. Humbug, a word play on Scrooge's catchphrase, "bah humbug". Scrooge is portrayed as the tightwad Charles Dickens intended him to be, with his consistent resistance to assist the poor, or even have Christmas dinner with his nephew Fred and his family. In hopes of resuscitating the goodness of his friend, the ghost of Jacob Marley, Scrooge's former business partner, visits Scrooge in his mansion, exhorting him to change his ways. Scrooge deems this to be madness and soon prepares for bed.

Nevertheless, Scrooge's attitude soon changes after a fateful night, wherein three ghosts visit him and take him through his past and present, and show him what his future will be like if he does not change. With The Ghost of Christmas Past, Scrooge sees a younger version of himself and realizes how greedy and miserly he has become. The Ghost of Christmas Present proceeds to take Scrooge to the home of his diligent employee Bob Cratchit, and discovers just how much poverty Cratchit and his family wallow in. Cratchit's crippled son Tiny Tim touches Scrooge's heart and instigates a transformation within his personality. The Ghost of Christmas Future then brings Scrooge to a cemetery to show the result of his once greedy behaviour. The production concludes with Scrooge assisting those less fortunate than himself.

== Cast ==
- Walter Matthau as Ebenezer Scrooge
  - Robert Morse as Young Ebenezer Scrooge
- Tom Bosley as B. A. H. Humbug, Esq.
- Theodore Bikel as Jacob Marley's Ghost
- Dennis Day as Nephew Fred
- Paul Frees as The Ghost of Christmas Past, The Ghost of Christmas Present, Old Joe
- Sonny Melendrez as Bob Cratchit
- Debbie Clinger as Martha Cratchit
- Robert Rolofson as Tim "Tiny Tim" Cratchit
- Steffani Calli as Belinda Cratchit
- Eric Hines as Peter Cratchit
- Darlene Conley as Mrs. Cratchit
- Shelby Flint as Belle
- Charles Matthau as The Boy
- Dee Stratton as Fred's Wife
- Diana Lee as Voice

== Staff ==
One of the original advertisements for the television special.

- Producers/Directors - Arthur Rankin, Jr., Jules Bass
- Associate Producer - Masaki Iizuka
- Writer - Romeo Muller
- Based on the 1843 novella A Christmas Carol - Charles Dickens
- Music - Fred Spielman
- Book and Lyrics - Janice Torre
- Design - Paul Coker, Jr.
- Animation Coordinator - Toru Hara
- Animation Supervisor - Tsuguyuki Kubo
- Animation Director - Katsuhisa Yamada
- Background Design - Minoru Nishida
- Backgrounds - Kazusuke Yoshihara, Kazuko Ito
- Layouts - Kazuyuki Kobayashi, Tadakatsu Yoshida, Hidemi Kubo
- Animation - Yoshiko Sasaki, Masahiro Yoshida
- Sound Recording - John Curcio, John Richards, Dave Iveland, Robert Elder
- Sound Effects - Tom Clack
- Vocal Arrangements - Jerry Graff
- Music Supervision - Maury Laws
- Music Arranger/Conductor - Bernard Hoffer

== Production ==
As with previous Rankin-Bass specials, animation duties for the 1978 version were provided by a Japanese studio, in this case Topcraft, many of whose animators would later form the core of Studio Ghibli. The Stingiest Man in Town was broadcast in Japan on Christmas Eve of 1978 (under the title Machi Ichiban Kechinbō). The Japanese version was directed by Katsuhisa Yamada, better known for his work on Mazinger Z and Devil Hunter Yohko and the characters were designed by Paul Coker Jr.

As of 2025, MeTV Toons owns the television rights to the special, which they aired as part of their "'Tis the Season for Toons" block on December 14, 2025.

== Home media ==
After acquiring the distribution rights to the post-1973 Rankin/Bass specials, Warner Home Video released The Stingiest Man in Town on VHS in 1993. Currently, the special has never had its own individual DVD release; it was instead made available on Warner's Classic Christmas Favorites box set in 2008. It was later included in the Rankin/Bass TV Holiday Favorites Collection manufacture-on-demand DVD, originally released by Warner Archive on July 30, 2012. The latter DVD was re-released (as a pressed disc) as part of The Complete Rankin/Bass Christmas Collection box set on October 18, 2022. The special made its physical high-definition debut on The Complete Rankin/Bass Christmas Collection's Blu-ray version, released in October 2023.

== Songs ==
The production features an unusual number of songs, far more than in other animated productions of the story.

- Sing a Christmas Carol
- An Old Fashioned Christmas
- Humbug
- The Stingiest Man in Town
- I Wear a Chain
- Golden Dreams
- It Might Have Been
- The Christmas Spirit
- Yes, There is a Santa Claus
- Birthday Party of the King
- One Little Boy
- You Wear a Chain
- Mankind Should be My Business

== See also ==
- Adaptations of A Christmas Carol
- List of Christmas films
