= Gaby (film) =

1956 drama film directed by Curtis Bernhardt

- Original film poster
- Directed by: Curtis Bernhardt
- Written by: S. N. Behrman; Paul H. Rameau; George Froeschel; Albert Hackett; Frances Goodrich; Charles Lederer
- Based on: Waterloo Bridge; 1930 play by Robert E. Sherwood
- Produced by: Edwin H. Knopf
- Starring: Leslie Caron; John Kerr; Cedric Hardwicke
- Cinematography: Robert H. Planck
- Edited by: John McSweeney Jr.
- Music by: Conrad Salinger
- Production company: Metro-Goldwyn-Mayer
- Distributed by: Loew's Inc.
- Release date: May 9, 1956
- Running time: 96 minutes
- Country: United States
- Language: English
- Budget: $1,863,000
- Box office: $1,357,000

Gaby is a 1956 American drama film directed by Curtis Bernhardt and starring Leslie Caron, John Kerr, Cedric Hardwicke, Taina Elg and Margalo Gillmore. It is the third version of the 1930 play Waterloo Bridge, previously made into films Waterloo Bridge (1931) and Waterloo Bridge (1940). It is the only version of the play made in color, and the least faithful to it. The title, the names of the main characters, and plot details were all changed. Unlike the 1931 and 1940 versions, this film ends happily.

This version was made by MGM and produced by Edwin H. Knopf. The screenplay was by Albert Hackett, Frances Goodrich and Charles Lederer, based on the screenplay of Waterloo Bridge (1940) by S. N. Behrman, Paul H. Rameau and George Froeschel. All three versions were based on the play by Robert E. Sherwood.

== Plot ==
Gaby is a ballet dancer in 1944 London who runs into corporal Gregory Wendell while rushing to catch the bus. Greg is mesmerized by Gaby and goes to the ballet to see her on stage, but Gaby wants nothing to do with Greg. He persists, and by the end of the day, she agrees to marry him.

Before they can marry, there is a mountain of red tape and Greg is shipped out suddenly for the D-Day landing, promising to marry her on his return. When she hears that he has been killed, Gaby becomes a prostitute as the only way to support herself (as in the 1940 film). When the report turns out to be false, and Greg returns alive, Gaby repeatedly tells him that she cannot marry him, but he is unable to guess the correct reason. When she finally tells him, he is shocked speechless for a very long time and she runs away into a bombing raid.

Greg drives after her in his father's car, then has to continue the pursuit on foot. He yells at her to "have a heart – I am crippled." Just as a V-1's engine stops, indicating an imminent explosion, he tells Gaby to duck into a doorway, saving her life. He says, "If you had died just now, I would never have been able to love anyone else." Gaby asks how he could possibly love her after what circumstances had forced her to do, but he says, "Let's forget the terrible things this war made us do."

== Cast ==
- Leslie Caron as Gaby
- John Kerr as Gregory Wendell
- Cedric Hardwicke as Edgar Carrington
- Taina Elg as Elsa
- Margalo Gillmore as Mrs. Carrington
- Scott Marlowe as Jan
- Ian Wolfe as Registrar
- Joe Di Reda as Allen
- Joe Corey as Pete
- James Best as Jim
- Lisa Montell as Claire
- Ruta Lee as Denise
- Narda Onyx as Olga
- Gloria Wood as Singer at the Bottle Club
- Lillian Kemble-Cooper as Mrs. Edward
- Gordon Richards as Air Raid Warden
- Queenie Leonard as Canteen Worker
- Wilbur Mack as Carrington's Butler
- Betty Harford as English Girl
- Alma Lawton as English Girl

== Plot differences ==
In contrast to the 1931 and 1940 films, Gaby was made after D-Day and the horror of the V-1 attacks on London, and incorporates references to both within its plot. In addition, made post-War, the atmosphere of hopelessness present in 1940 is replaced by an air of optimism.

== Production ==
The film was envisioned as a vehicle for Leslie Caron. The male lead was given to John Kerr, who had become a star on Broadway in Tea and Sympathy and had just made The Cobweb for MGM. Kerr turned down Friendly Persuasion (1956) to take the role in Gaby because the latter was a lead, not a supporting part. He made it under a two picture deal with MGM the other one being Tea and Sympathy.

== Reception ==
=== Box office ===
According to MGM records the film earned $647,000 in the US and Canada and $710,000 elsewhere, resulting in a loss of $1,356,000.

=== Critical ===
Filmink called it "not a very good movie, with a stupid script (why have a happy ending? Why not make it clear Caron is a prostitute?), the leads have no chemistry or heat... and Kerr’s golly-gee-whiz performance is adequate but feels half-hearted. In his defence, he lacks a decent character to play."

== See also ==
- List of American films of 1956
- Waterloo Bridge (1931)
- Waterloo Bridge (1940)
