= The High Road (play) =

The High Road is a comedy play by the British writer Frederick Lonsdale which was first staged in 1927. It opened in the West End at the Shaftesbury Theatre, and ran for 234 performances. The following year, it opened on Broadway at the Fulton Theatre, where ran for 144 performances, with Alfred Drayton and Frederick Kerr from the London cast.

In 1930 it was adapted into the American film The Lady of Scandal directed by Sidney Franklin and starring Ruth Chatterton and Basil Rathbone.

== Original London cast ==
- Ernest - Brian Gilmour
- Lord Trench - Fred Kerr
- Sir Reginald Whelby - Miles Clifton
- Lord Crayle - Allan Aynesworth
- Morton - Claude Disney-Roebuck
- Duke of Warrington - Ian Hunter
- Lord Teylesmore - Colin Keith-Johnston
- James Hilary - Alfred Drayton
- Alex - Marjorie Brooks
- Lady Minister - Mary Jerrold
- Lady Trench - Gertrude Kingston
- Elsie Hilary - Cecily Byrne

== Bibliography ==
- Donaldson, Frances. Freddy Lonsdale. Bloomsbury Publishing, 2011.
- Nicoll, Alardyce. English Drama, 1900-1930: The Beginnings of the Modern Period. Part I. Cambridge University Press, 1973.
