= Tragedy in a Temporary Town =

"Tragedy in a Temporary Town" may refer to:

- Tragedy in a Temporary Town (The Alcoa Hour), a 1956 episode of The Alcoa Hour
- Tragedy in a Temporary Town (Shell Presents), a 1959 episode of Shell Presents
