= Waterloo Bridge (1931 film) =

1931 film

- Theatrical release poster
- Directed by: James Whale
- Written by: Benn Levy; Tom Reed
- Based on: Waterloo Bridge; 1930 play by Robert E. Sherwood
- Produced by: Carl Laemmle, Jr.
- Starring: Mae Clarke; Kent Douglass
- Cinematography: Arthur Edeson
- Edited by: Clarence Kolster
- Color process: Black and white
- Production company: Universal Pictures
- Distributed by: Universal Pictures
- Release date: September 4, 1931
- Running time: 81 minutes
- Country: United States
- Language: English
- Budget: $252,000

Waterloo Bridge is a 1931 American pre-Code drama romance war film directed by James Whale and starring Mae Clarke and Kent Douglass. The screenplay by Benn Levy and Tom Reed is based on the 1930 play Waterloo Bridge by Robert E. Sherwood.

The film was remade in 1940 as Waterloo Bridge and as Gaby in 1956. Both remakes were made by Metro-Goldwyn-Mayer, which bought the 1931 version from Universal. Today, the rights to all three films are held by Warner Bros. and their subsidiary Turner Entertainment. This film was one of Bette Davis' early movies.

As a published work from 1931, Waterloo Bridge will enter the American public domain on January 1, 2027.

== Plot ==
Unable to find work in London at the height of World War I, American chorus girl Myra Deauville resorts to prostitution to support herself. She sometimes meets her clients on Waterloo Bridge, the primary entry point into the city for soldiers on military leave. During an air raid, she meets fellow American Roy Cronin, a soldier serving with the Canadian Expeditionary Force. Distracted from her original plans by the air raid, she makes no attempt to solicit him, and the naïve young soldier remains unaware of her profession. After the bombing stops, Roy escorts her to her apartment, where the two have dinner.

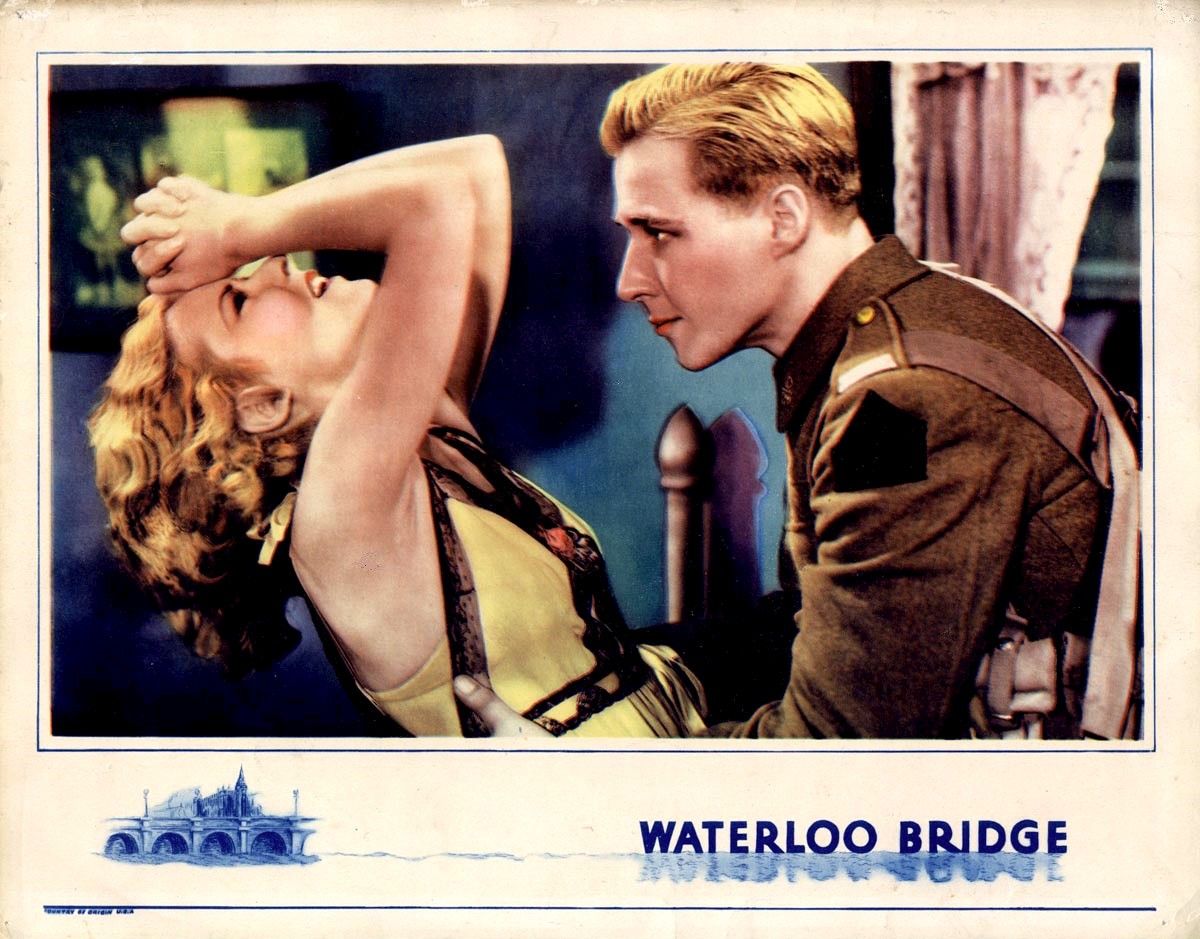
Lobby card

Describing herself simply as an unemployed chorus girl, Myra gains Roy's sympathy. He offers to pay her overdue rent, but she rejects his offer. After the all clear is sounded, Roy departs, and Myra returns to the streets. The following morning, Roy returns to visit her, and landlady Mrs. Hobley lets him into her apartment. There he meets Myra's friend and neighbor Kitty, who tells him Myra needs someone to love and protect her. Myra later berates Kitty for interfering and rejects her advice to marry Roy to ensure a better future for herself.

Roy takes Myra to visit his family at their country estate, where he proposes to her. Later that night she tells Roy's mother, Mary, the truth about herself. Mary is sympathetic but implores Myra not to marry Roy. The following morning, Myra slips away and returns to London by train. Eventually Roy visits her and asks her to explain her abrupt departure. Because he is on the verge of returning to the battlefields in France, he begs Myra to marry him immediately. Initially she agrees, but after asking him to wait outside in the hall, she changes her mind and escapes through the apartment window. Seeking the rent, Mrs. Hobley enters, and believing Myra has run off to avoid her financial obligation, reveals her true profession to Roy.

Although shocked, Roy searches for Myra and eventually finds her on Waterloo Bridge, where he tells her he still loves and wants to marry her. The military police insist Roy join a truck of departing soldiers or be considered a deserter, and once he secures Myra's promises to marry him upon his return, he departs. The air raid sirens sound, and as Myra seeks shelter, she is killed by a bomb.

== Cast ==
- Mae Clarke as Myra
- Douglass Montgomery (credited as Kent Douglass) as Roy Cronin
- Doris Lloyd as Kitty, Myra's friend
- Frederick Kerr as Major Wetherby, Roy's stepfather
- Enid Bennett as Mrs. Wetherby, Roy's mother
- Bette Davis as Janet Cronin, Roy's sister
- Ethel Griffies as Mrs. Hobley, Myra's landlady
- Rita Carlisle as the old woman who drops her potatoes
- Ruth Handforth as Augusta, the Wetherby's maid

== Production ==
Robert E. Sherwood had based his play on his own wartime experiences, including a chance meeting during a 1918 air raid with an American chorus girl turned streetwalker. The Broadway production opened on January 6, 1930 at the Fulton Theatre, where it ran for only 64 performances. Despite the fact it was neither a critical nor commercial success, film producer Carl Laemmle, Jr. considered it a prestige project and purchased the film rights for Universal Pictures.

Having been impressed by the film Journey's End (1930), Laemmle hired James Whale to direct Waterloo Bridge. Sherwood's play had evolved into a war film in the original screenplay, Benn Levy was hired to restore it to a character drama, and Tom Reed provided "continuity and additional dialogue." Because Universal was undergoing financial problems, Laemmle budgeted the film at $252,000 and gave Whale a 26-day shooting schedule.

Rose Hobart, under contract to Universal, was assigned the role of Myra Deauville but declined it when she learned the studio did not intend to renew her contract. She was replaced by Mae Clarke, a Columbia Pictures contract player now best known to audiences as the woman whose face was the target of half a grapefruit shoved into it by James Cagney in The Public Enemy. "I think Whale saw something I know I had then", Clarke later recalled, "and that was a basic confusion and insecurity I didn't mind projecting into my work." She enjoyed working with the director, who "wanted to see what you thought of it," she said. "He wouldn't say how to do it. He would tell you what was happening."

Less experienced co-star Kent Douglass, later known as Douglass Montgomery, required a great deal of attention from Whale, who shut down production for three days while he worked with the novice actor. Also in the cast was Bette Davis who, in the small role of Janet Cronin, was listed sixth out of nine in the opening credits and was ignored by all the critics. "Perfectly logical," Davis later recalled. "I had about four lines ... I yearned all during shooting to play Myra. I could have!"

Whale completed the film $50,000 under budget, and Laemmle was so impressed he gave the director the choice of any property the studio had in the planning stages. He selected Frankenstein and became one of the leading directors at Universal.

== Censorship, remakes, and re-release ==
Because of its controversial material, censor boards in Chicago, New York City, and Pennsylvania insisted extensive cuts be made to the film. When the Production Code was enforced in July 1934, it became impossible to re-release the original version of Waterloo Bridge. In 1939, MGM bought the rights to the property, and the following year released an adaptation starring Vivien Leigh and Robert Taylor and directed by Mervyn LeRoy. In that version, Leigh plays a ballerina who only turns to prostitution after she is dismissed from her job for seeing Taylor's character, and she thinks he has died in the war.

The 1956 film Gaby, directed by Curtis Bernhardt and starring Leslie Caron and John Kerr, advanced the story's timeline to World War II and created a happy rather than tragic ending. After being stored in the studio vaults for 35 years, Waterloo Bridge was re-discovered in 1975, but a joint ownership agreement between MGM and Universal prevented it from being seen for another two decades.

== Critical reception ==
Mordaunt Hall of The New York Times called the film "a praiseworthy picture" that "is somewhat sketchy in substance, but it is acted cleverly and there is imagination in the employment of the camera and the microphone." He added, "It might have been even a more satisfactory production had Mr. Whale had full say as to the dialogue, for the lines from some of the cockney characters are occasionally a little forced. The whole narrative is an attenuated short story, with the result that parts of it are not especially interesting."

Billy Wilkerson of The Hollywood Reporter wrote "It is grown up entertainment, not sophisticated, but mature ... so moving and believable as to send any audience out talking and raving in appreciation."

== Home media ==
On December 5, 2006, Warner Home Video released the film, together with Baby Face and Red-Headed Woman, as part of a DVD box set titled TCM Archives – Forbidden Hollywood Collection, Vol. 1.
