= Acropolis (disambiguation) =

An acropolis is a "high city" or citadel.

Acropolis or Akropolis may also refer to:

- Acropolis of Athens, ancient citadel located on a high rocky outcrop above the city of Athens
- Acropolis or Makrygianni, Athens, a neighborhood near the monument
- Acropolis metro station in Athens
- Acropolis of Rhodes, the acropolis of ancient Rhodes (city)
- Acropolis (butterfly), a genus in the family Nymphalidae
- Akropolis (Vilnius), the largest shopping mall in Lithuania
- Akropolis (Kaunas), the fourth largest shopping mall in Lithuania
- Akropolis (Klaipėda), the sixth largest shopping mall in Lithuania
- Akropolis (newspaper), a Greek newspaper based in Athens
- Acropolis (play), by Robert E. Sherwood (1933)
- The Acropolis (mountain), in Tasmania

== See also ==
- Acropolis Rally, racing competition in Greece
- Acropolis Tournament, basketball international tournament
- Acropoliis, Indian film production company
