= The Stingiest Man in Town (1956) =

- Basil Rathbone as Scrooge
- Genre: Christmas Family-musical
- Written by: Charles Dickens; Janice Torre
- Directed by: Daniel Petrie
- Music by: Fred Spielman; Janice Torre

Production
- Producer: Joel Spector
- Running time: 81 minutes
- Production companies: Showcase Productions, Inc.

Original release
- Network: NBC
- Release: December 23, 1956

The Stingiest Man in Town is a 1956 American musical television special directed by Daniel Petrie. It aired on December 23, 1956, as part of the NBC anthology series The Alcoa Hour. The production is a musical adaptation of Charles Dickens's 1843 novella A Christmas Carol, with music by Fred Spielman and lyrics by Janice Torre. It is notable for being the first musical version of A Christmas Carol to be televised in color.

== Plot ==
Faithful to Dickens's original story, The Stingiest Man in Town follows the journey of Ebenezer Scrooge, a miserly old man who despises Christmas and all forms of generosity. On Christmas Eve, he is visited by the ghost of his former business partner Jacob Marley and the spirits of Christmas Past, Present, and Yet to Come. Through these supernatural encounters, Scrooge is forced to confront the consequences of his greed and is ultimately transformed into a kinder, more compassionate man.

== Cast ==
- Basil Rathbone as Ebenezer Scrooge
- Robert Weede as Jacob Marley
- Martyn Green as Bob Cratchit
- Vic Damone as Fred, Scrooge's nephew
- The Four Lads as Vocal Quartet / Carolers
- Patrice Munsel as Belle, Scrooge's lost love
- Johnny Desmond as the narrator (in some listings)

== Musical Numbers ==
The production featured several original songs by Spielman and Torre, including:

- "I Wear a Chain"
- “An Old-Fashioned Christmas”
- “The Stingiest Man in Town”
- “A Christmas Carol”
- “Yes, There Is a Santa Claus”

== Reception ==
Upon its initial broadcast, The Stingiest Man in Town received praise for its performances, particularly Rathbone's portrayal of Scrooge, and for its music and lavish staging. Though it aired only once on live television, it gained a lasting legacy and is remembered as a pioneering color television musical.

== Legacy ==
In 1978, Rankin/Bass produced an animated television remake, featuring the voice of Walter Matthau as Scrooge and including many of the same songs from the 1956 version. This adaptation introduced the story to a new generation and helped preserve the musical's place in the canon of Christmas television specials. Although the 1956 broadcast was believed to be lost for many years, a kinescope recording resurfaced in 2011 and has been made available for public viewing, including DVD releases and occasional airings on classic television networks.

== See also ==
- A Christmas Carol adaptations
- Rankin/Bass holiday specials
- Basil Rathbone filmography
