= Robert Anderson (playwright) =

American playwright, screenwriter, and theater producer

- Born: Robert Woodruff Anderson; April 28, 1917; Manhattan, New York, U.S.
- Died: February 9, 2009 (aged 91); Manhattan, New York, U.S.
- Resting place: Roxbury Center Cemetery, Roxbury, Connecticut, U.S.
- Education: Harvard University
- Occupations: playwright screenwriter theatrical producer
- Spouses: Phyllis Stohl (m. 1940; died 1956) Teresa Wright (m. 1959; div. 1978)
- Writing career
- Years active: 1948–1992

Robert Woodruff Anderson (April 28, 1917 – February 9, 2009) was an American playwright, screenwriter, and theatrical producer. He received two Academy Award nominations for Best Writing, Screenplay Based on Material from Another Medium, for the drama films The Nun's Story (1959) and I Never Sang for My Father (1970), the latter based on his play.

== Life and career ==
Anderson was born in New York City, the son of Myra Esther (Grigg) and James Hewston Anderson, a self-made businessman. He was educated at Phillips Exeter Academy, which he later said he found a lonely experience. While there he fell in love with an older woman, an event which later becomes the basis of the plot of Tea and Sympathy. Anderson also attended Harvard University, where he took an undergraduate as well as a master's degree.

He may be best-remembered as the author of Tea and Sympathy. The play made its Broadway debut in 1953 and was made into a Metro-Goldwyn-Mayer film in 1956; both starred Deborah Kerr and John Kerr.

You Know I Can't Hear You When the Water's Running, a collection of four one-act comedies, opened in New York in 1967 and ran for more than 700 performances. His other successful Broadway plays were Silent Night, Lonely Night (1959) and I Never Sang for My Father (1968).

He wrote the screenplays for Until They Sail (1957), The Nun's Story (1959), and The Sand Pebbles (1966). He also wrote many television scripts, including the TV play The Last Act Is a Solo (1991) and the novels After (1973) and Getting Up and Going Home (1978).

He was inducted into the American Theater Hall of Fame in 1981.

Anderson was married to Phyllis Stohl from 1940 until her death in 1956 and to actress Teresa Wright from 1959 until their divorce in 1978. Anderson died of pneumonia on February 9, 2009, at his home in Manhattan, aged 91. He had been suffering from Alzheimer's disease for seven years prior to his death.

== Advocacy ==
As a supporter of writers' rights in theatre, Anderson was a member of the Dramatists Guild of America and was elected president in 1971. He continued to serve the non-profit organization until 1973.

== Selected credits ==
=== Plays ===
- Dance Me a Song (1950) - contributing sketch writer
- Tea and Sympathy (1953) - writer - original Broadway production ran 712 performances
- Sabrina Fair (1954) - producer, via the Playwrights' Company
- All Summer Long (1955) - writer and producer via the Playwrights' Company
- Time Remembered (1957) - producer via the Playwrights' Company
- The Rope Dancers (1957) - producer via the Playwrights' Company
- You Know I Can't Hear You When the Water's Running (1967) (four unrelated one-acts) - writer
- Silent Night, Lonely Night (1969) - writer
  - I'm Herbert
  - The Shock of Recognition
  - The Footsteps of Doves
  - I'll Be Home for Christmas
- I Never Sang for My Father (1968) - writer
- Double Solitaire (1970) - writer
- The Last Act Is a Solo (1991) - writer

=== Television ===
- The Philco-Goodyear Television Playhouse (1948)
- The Prudential Family Playhouse -adaptation of "Biography" (1950)
- The Prudential Family Playhouse - adaptation of "Dodsworth" (1950)
- Studio One in Hollywood - adaptation of story "Wintertime" (1951)
- Schlitz Playhouse - adaptation of Still Life by Noël Coward (1951)
- Suspense (TV series) - "The Moving Target" directed by Robert Mulligan (1952)
- Suspense - "The Man Who Cried Wolf" directed by Robert Mulligan (1953)
- Medallion Theatre - adaptation of "The Canterville Ghost" (1953)
- Alcoa Hour - "Eden Rose" (1956)
- Goodyear Playhouse - "Rise Up and Walk" (1956)
- Goodyear Playhouse - adapted his own "All Summer Long" (1956)
- Armchair Theatre/The United States Steel Hour - adaptation of "The Old Lady Shows Her Medals" by J.M. Barrie (1956)
- ITV Play of the Week - adapted his own "All Summer Long" (1960)
- Play of the Week - adapted his own "All Summer Long" (1961)
- Festival - adaptation of Silent Night Lonely Night (1965)
- Double Solitaire (1974) - adapted from his play
- The Patricia Neal Story (1981)
- The General Motors Playwrights Theater - adaptation of "The Last Act Is a Solo" (1991)
- Absolute Strangers (1991)
- Getting Up and Going Home (1992) - based on his book

=== Screenplays ===
- Tea and Sympathy (1956) - screenplay, based on his play
- Until They Sail (1957)
- The Nun's Story (1959)
- The Sand Pebbles (1966)
- Silent Night, Lonely Night (1969, TV movie) - based on his play
- I Never Sang for My Father (1970) - screenplay based on his play

=== Novels ===
- After (1973)
- Getting Up and Going Home (1978)

== Awards and nominations ==
Year	Award	Category	Nominated work	Result
1960	12th Writers Guild of America Awards	Best Written American Drama	The Nun's Story	Nominated
1960	32nd Academy Awards	Best Writing, Screenplay Based on Material from Another Medium	The Nun's Story	Nominated
1967	24th Golden Globe Awards	Best Screenplay	The Sand Pebbles	Nominated
1967	19th Writers Guild of America Awards	Best Written American Drama	The Sand Pebbles	Nominated
1971	23rd Writers Guild of America Awards	Best Drama Adapted from Another Medium	I Never Sang for My Father	Won
1971	43rd Academy Awards	Best Writing, Screenplay Based on Material from Another Medium	I Never Sang for My Father	Nominated
