= Tragedy in a Temporary Town (The Alcoa Hour) =

- The Alcoa Hour episode
- Episode no.: Season 1 Episode 10
- Directed by: Sidney Lumet
- Teleplay by: Reginald Rose
- Original air date: 19 February 1956
- Running time: 47–50 minutes

Guest appearance
- Lloyd Bridges

"Tragedy in a Temporary Town" is a dramatic teleplay written by Reginald Rose. It was originally produced for The Alcoa Hour in the US directed by Sidney Lumet and sparked media attention for its portrayal of race and for Lloyd Bridges' ad-libbed profanity during its live broadcast. Bridges was nominated for the 1957 Emmy Award for Best Single Performance by an Actor, but did not win.

In 1959, the same script was produced as the third episode of the Australian anthology drama show Shell Presents starring Michael Pate.

== Plot ==
In a small town, a group of migrant workers are employed at an aircraft factory and live in a trailer park. When 15 year-old Dotty Fisher claims she has been attacked, a group of men, led by Frank Doran, attempt to find out who is possible. They seize a boy, Raphael Infante, and threaten to lynch him. Only a tolerant man called Alec Beggs dares to stand up to the mob in an attempt to stop them.

== Cast ==
For the 1956 Alcoa Hour Production:

- Edward Binns as Anderson
- Lloyd Bridges as Alec Beggs
- Rafael Campos as Raphael Infante
- Robert Dryden as Sankey
- Robert Emhardt as Matt Fisher
- Pete Gumeny as Reynolds
- Donald Harron as Mickey Doran
- Betty Lou Keim as Dotty Fisher
- Will Kuluva as Julio Infante
- Vivian Nathan as Grace Beggs
- Milton Selzer as Pike
- Clifford Tatum Jr. as Buddy Beggs
- Jack Warden as Frank Doran
- Jane White as Dolores Infante

== Reception ==
The US production garnered press in February 1956 for actor Lloyd Bridges' emotional performance during which Bridges inadvertently slipped some profanity in while ad-libbing. Although the slip of the lip and the racial content generated some complaints, most of the public feedback was positive. The episode won a Robert E. Sherwood Television Award, with Bridges' slip being defended even by some members of the clergy. The episode, during which an innocent Puerto Rican man is targeted by a mob for a sexual crime, was cited by the Anti-Defamation League as "the best dramatic program of the year dealing with interethnic group relations."
