= John Kerr (actor) =

American actor and attorney (1931–2013)

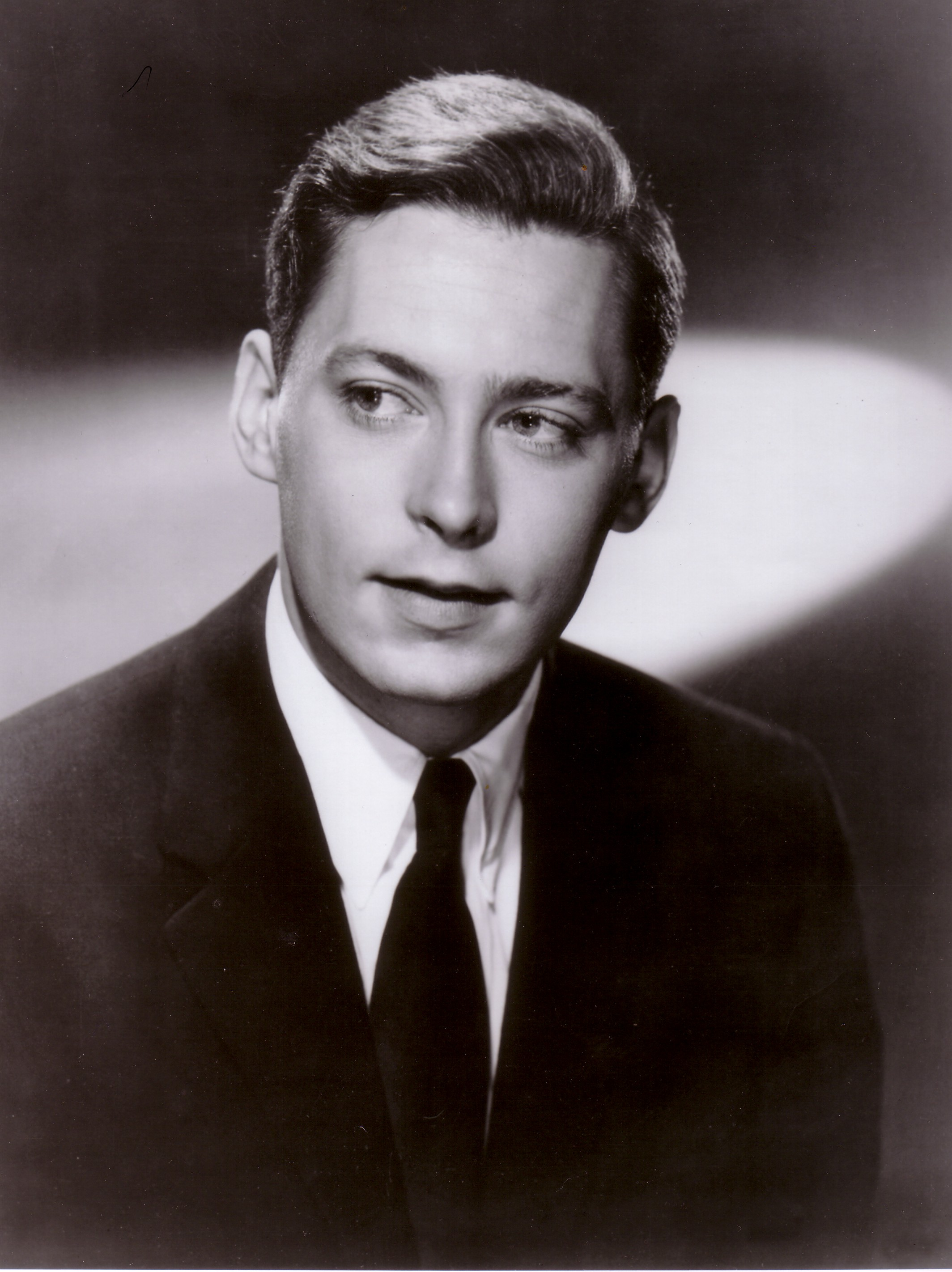
- Kerr in 1957
- Born: John Grinham Kerr; November 15, 1931; New York City, U.S.
- Died: February 2, 2013 (aged 81); Pasadena, California, U.S.
- Education: Harvard University; UCLA Law School
- Occupations: Actor (1940-1987), attorney (1969-2000)
- Years active: 1940–2000
- Spouses: Priscilla Smith (m. 1952; div. 1972); Barbara Chu (m. 1979)
- Children: 3
- Parent(s): Geoffrey Kerr; June Walker
- Relatives: Frederick Kerr (grandfather)
- Awards: Tony Award for Best Featured Actor in a Play; 1954 Tea and Sympathy Theatre World Award; 1953 Bernardine Golden Globe Award for New Star of the Year – Actor; 1956 Tea and Sympathy
- Website: www.fitweb.or.jp/~johnkerr/play.html

John Grinham Kerr (November 15, 1931 – February 2, 2013) was an American actor and attorney.

He began his professional career on Broadway, earning critical acclaim for his performances in Mary Chase's Bernardine and Robert Anderson's Tea and Sympathy, then made a transition into a screen career.

He reprised his role in the film version of Tea and Sympathy, which won him the Golden Globe Award for Most Promising Newcomer, and portrayed Lieutenant Joseph Cable in the Rodgers and Hammerstein movie musical South Pacific. He appeared in a number of television series, including a starring role on Peyton Place.

In the 1970s, he largely moved from acting to becoming a lawyer, making appearances in a few small roles in Canadian-produced films such as Plague and The Amateur. He operated a legal practice in Beverly Hills until 2000, when he retired from the profession.

== Early life ==
Kerr was born November 15, 1931, in New York City to British-born Geoffrey Kerr and American-born June Walker. Both were stage and film actors, and his grandfather was Frederick Kerr, a British trans-Atlantic character actor in the period 1880–1930; Kerr developed an early interest in following in their footsteps.

He grew up in the New York City area, and went to Phillips Exeter Academy in New Hampshire; after graduating from Harvard University, he worked at the nearby Brattle Theatre in Cambridge, Massachusetts, and in summer stock. For some time, he pursued graduate studies in the Russian (now Harriman) Institute of Columbia University.

== Acting career ==
=== Stage ===
He made his Broadway debut in 1953 in Mary Coyle Chase's Bernardine, a high-school comedy for which he won a Theatre World Award. In 1953–1954, he received critical acclaim as a troubled prep school student in Robert Anderson's play Tea and Sympathy. In 1954, he won a Tony Award, New York Drama Critics Award, and Donaldson Award for his performance, and he later starred in the film version in 1956. He starred in stagings of All Summer Long and The Infernal Machine, and both starred and directed a staging of Bus Stop at the Fred Miller Theatre in Milwaukee.

Throughout the 1960s, he was affiliated with a number of non-profit theatre companies in Southern California, including the La Jolla Playhouse, the UCLA Theatre Group. For a time he was an artist-in-residence at Stanford University. He was the producer of a 1964 summer season of the American National Theater and Academy, held at Beverly Hills High School.

=== Film and television ===
He made The Cobweb for MGM, which liked his work so much it co-starred him with Leslie Caron in Gaby (1956), the third remake of Waterloo Bridge, which, in its original pre-Code 1931 version, featured Kerr's grandfather, actor Frederick Kerr. Kerr starred with Deborah Kerr (no relation) in Tea and Sympathy in 1956, reprising his role from the stage version. Filmink magazine declared "for a red hot minute" that Kerr was going to be "the Next Big Thing".

In a widely publicized decision, Kerr declined to play the role of Charles Lindbergh in The Spirit of St. Louis because he did not respect Lindbergh's early alleged support of the Nazi regime in Germany before America's entry into World War II. "I don't admire the ideals of the hero," Mr. Kerr told The New York Post. (Producer Leland Hayward also claimed Kerr did not want to be permanently identified with the part.) The part instead went to Jimmy Stewart, a veteran of World War II, who was over 20 years older than Kerr and nearly twice the age of Lindbergh when he made his historic 1927 flight. Kerr also reportedly turned down the role of Ensign Pulver in the film of Mister Roberts and the juvenile lead in Friendly Persuasion.

Kerr had a major role in the film version of Rodgers and Hammerstein's South Pacific (1958), playing Lt. Joseph Cable, the newly arrived Marine about to be sent on a dangerous spy mission. In The Crowded Sky (1960), Kerr played a pilot who helps the Captain (Dana Andrews) steer a crippled airliner back to earth. Another film appearance was in Roger Corman's The Pit and the Pendulum (1961). In 1963, Kerr had a continuing role on Arrest and Trial, playing Assistant District Attorney Barry Pine. As noted by Filmink "these were support roles and it was clear Hollywood no longer regarded Kerr as a leading man."

During the 1960s, Kerr guest starred on several TV series, including The Alfred Hitchcock Hour, Rawhide, Gunsmoke and Adam-12. He had a regular role on the TV series Peyton Place, playing District Attorney John Fowler during the 1965–1966 season. Also in 1964-1965, he appeared as guest star on several episodes of Twelve O'Clock High.

In the 1970s, Kerr had a recurring role as prosecutor Gerald O'Brien on The Streets of San Francisco and he made guest appearances in several other TV programs including The Mod Squad, Columbo, McMillan and Wife, Barnaby Jones and The Feather and Father Gang.

== Legal career ==
Kerr took an interest in film directing, and worked as an apprentice with Leo Penn, who was then directing episodes of the television series Run for Your Life — but Kerr was quickly disenchanted by the mundane aspects of the work, and applied to and was accepted at UCLA Law School. He received his J.D. degree from that law school, and passed the California bar in 1970. He later pursued a full-time career as a lawyer, but still accepted occasional small roles in a variety of television productions over the years. With regard to turning to law, Kerr told American Legends website: "I felt it was time for a change and wanted to do something different. In the 1960s I was a semi-regular on Peyton Place with Barbara Parkins, Mia Farrow, and Ryan O'Neal. I played a lawyer--and prosecuted Ryan O'Neal on the show, before heading off to law school." He retired from legal practice in 2000.

== Personal life and death ==
Kerr married Priscilla Smith in 1952; the couple divorced in 1972. He married Barbara Chu in 1979. He had two daughters and a son with Smith as well as a stepson and stepdaughter from his marriage to Chu.

Kerr died of heart failure on February 2, 2013, at Huntington Hospital in Pasadena, California. He was cremated and his ashes given to his widow.

== Stage credits ==
| Run | Title | Role | Director | Theatre | Notes |
|---|---|---|---|---|---|
| 08/5/40 - 08/10/40 | Tomorrow and Tomorrow | Ruth's Son | Arthur Walton | The Cape Playhouse | |
| 07/19/49 - 07/24/49 | O Mistress Mine | Michael Brown | Arthur Walton | The Cape Playhouse | |
| 10/16/52 - 02/28/53 | Bernardine | Arthur Beaumont | Guthrie McClintic | Playhouse Theatre | Theatre World Award |
| 09/30/53 - 06/18/55 | Tea and Sympathy | Tom Robinson Lee | Elia Kazan | Ethel Barrymore Theatre; Longacre Theatre; 48th Street Theatre | Tony Award for Best Featured Actor in a Play; New York Drama Critics Award for Best Supporting Actor in a Play; Donaldson Award for Best Supporting Actor of the Season |
| 09/23/54 - 11/13/54 | All Summer Long | Don | Alan Schneider | Coronet Theatre; Booth Theatre | |
| 02/03/58 - 03/09/58 | The Infernal Machine | Oedipus | Herbert Berghof | Phoenix Theatre | |
| 11/25/58 - 12/27/58 | Cue for Passion | Tony Burgess | Elmer Rice | Henry Miller's Theatre | |
| 04/06/59 - 04/19/59 | The Hasty Heart | Lachie | | Fred Miller Theatre | |
| 07/23/59 - 07/27/59 | The Glass Menagerie | Tom Wingfield | | Lobero Theatre | |
| 12/03/60 - 12/28/60 | Bus Stop | Bo Decker | Himself | Fred Miller Theatre | Also director |

=== Other credits ===
- Dream Girl (1947, summer repertory)
- Joan of Lorraine (1946, summer repertory)
- September Tide (1949, summer repertory)
- Billy Budd (1951, Brattle Theatre)
- A Midsummer Night's Dream (1951, Brattle Theatre)
- Twelfth Night (1951, Brattle Theatre)
- A Sleep of Prisoners (1952, Brattle Theatre)
- Ring Round the Moon (1954, Hyde Park Theatre)
- The Rainmaker (1960, Wharf Theater)
- Five Finger Exercise (1961, La Jolla Playhouse)
- Sound Of Murder (1961, La Jolla Playhouse) - as director
- Love and Like (1962, UCLA Theatre Group)
- Antigone (1962, UCLA Theatre Group)
- Hamlet (1963, Stanford University)
- Liliom (1964, University of Oregon)
- Who's Afraid of Virginia Woolf? (1964) - as producer
- Androcles and the Lion (1964, American National Theater and Academy) - as producer
- Oedipus Rex (1964, American National Theater and Academy) - as producer
- J.B. (1964, American National Theater and Academy) - as producer
- Waiting for Godot (1964, American National Theater and Academy) - as producer
- Spoon River Anthology (1964, American National Theater and Academy) - as producer
- Desire Under the Elms (1964, American National Theater and Academy) - as producer
- The Tenth Man (1967, New York City Center)
- Mister Roberts (1965, Melodyland Theatre and Circle Star Theater)

== Filmography ==
=== Film ===
| Year | Title | Role | Director | Notes |
|---|---|---|---|---|
| 1955 | The Cobweb | Steven W. Holte | Vincente Minnelli | |
| 1956 | Gaby | Gregory Y. Wendell | Curtis Bernhardt | |
| 1956 | Tea and Sympathy | Tom Robinson Lee | Vincente Minnelli | Golden Globe Award for Most Promising Newcomer - Male |
| 1957 | The Vintage | Ernesto Barandero | Jeffrey Hayden | |
| 1958 | South Pacific | Lt. Joseph Cable | Joshua Logan | singing voice by Bill Lee |
| 1960 | The Crowded Sky | Mike Rule | Joseph Pevney | |
| 1960 | Girl of the Night | Larry Taylor | Joseph Cates | |
| 1961 | The Pit and the Pendulum | Francis Barnard | Roger Corman | |
| 1961 | King of Kings | Man at Sermon on the Mount | Nicholas Ray | cameo |
| 1961 | Seven Women from Hell | Lt. Bill Jackson | Robert D. Webb | |
| 1972 | Dealing: Or the Berkeley-to-Boston Forty-Brick Lost-Bag Blues | Stockbroker | Paul Williams | uncredited |
| 1974 | Only God Knows | Health Inspector | Peter Pearson | uncredited |
| 1979 | Plague | Willis, Security Guard | Ed Hunt | |
| 1981 | The Amateur | CIA Agent Emil | Charles Jarrott | |
| 1987 | Australian Dream | Frank the Swaggie | Jackie McKimmie | |

=== Television ===
| Year | Title | Role | Notes |
|---|---|---|---|
| 1953 | Lux Video Theatre | Tony | episode: "The White Gown" |
| 1953 | You Are There | Jesse James | episode: "The Capture of Jesse James" |
| 1953 | Horace Mann's Miracle | Young Pizzi | |
| 1953 | Danger | | episode: "Operation Nightmare" |
| 1953–54 | Suspense | Derek Howard | 2 episodes |
| 1953–57 | The Big Story | Howie Madden | 2 episodes |
| 1953–57 | Studio One | | 2 episodes |
| 1954 | Justice | | episode: "The Scandal That Rocked the Town" |
| 1955 | Repertory Theatre | George Avery | episode: "The Bold and the Brave" |
| 1955 | The Elgin Hour | Pvt. Foster | episode: "Combat Medics" |
| 1955 | The Alcoa Hour | Jamie Hallock | episode: "Undertow" |
| 1955–57 | Climax! | Various | 3 episodes |
| 1956 | The Corn Is Green | Morgan Evans | |
| 1956–62 | The United States Steel Hour | | 3 episodes |
| 1957 | Fireside Theatre | Tom Parr | episode: "Killer's Pride" |
| 1957–58 | Playhouse 90 | David McAdam / Capt. Neil Dameron | 2 episodes |
| 1958 | Alcoa Theatre | Flight Lt. Upton | episode: "Strange Occurrence at Rokesay" |
| 1958 | General Electric Theater | Freddie | episode: "A Question of Romance" |
| 1959 | Berkeley Square | Peter Standish | |
| 1959 | Riverboat | Jefferson Carruthers | episode: "The Barrier" |
| 1960 | The Magical World of Disney | Martin Didler | episode: "Elfego Baca: Friendly Enemies at Law" |
| 1960 | Rawhide | Bert Eaton | episode: "Incident of the Last Chance" |
| 1961 | Checkmate | Wilt Kamens | episode: "The Crimson Pool" |
| 1962 | Gunsmoke | Lute Willis | episode: "Half Straight" |
| 1962 | Bus Stop | Jim Carmody | episode: "Verdict of 12" |
| 1962 | The Lloyd Bridges Show | David | episode: "The Miracle of Mesa Verde" |
| 1962 | The Defenders | Jonathan Winthrop | episode: "The Apostle" |
| 1963 | The Virginian | Oliver Smith | episode: "The Judgement" |
| 1963 | Wagon Train | Jim Whitlow | episode: "The Jim Whitlow Story" |
| 1963–64 | Arrest and Trial | Barry Pine | recurring role |
| 1964–65 | Twelve O'Clock High | Maj. Herrick / Lt. Ray Thacker | 2 episodes |
| 1965 | Alfred Hitchcock Presents | Glendon Baker | episode: "An Unlocked Window" |
| 1965 | The Long, Hot Summer | Duane Galloway | episode: "The Homecoming" |
| 1965–66 | Peyton Place | John Fowler | main cast |
| 1966 | Run for Your Life | Alex Ryder | episode: "The Day Time Stopped" |
| 1967 | Flipper | Keller | 2 episodes |
| 1967 | The High Chaparral | Creed Hallock | episode: "Sudden Country" |
| 1967–70 | The F.B.I. | Gary Morgan / William Converse / Doug Parker / Clayton McGregor | 7 episodes |
| 1969 | Adam-12 | Father Joe | episode: "Log 93: Once a Junkie" |
| 1969–70 | The Name of the Game | Father Billy Keaton / Stuart Clark | 2 episodes |
| 1970 | The Bold Ones: The Lawyers | Dr. Philip Blackburn | episode: "The Verdict" |
| 1971 | The Young Lawyers | Andrew Rogers | episode: "False Witness" |
| 1971 | Yuma | Capt. White | |
| 1971 | Owen Marshall, Counselor at Law | Clay Arnold | episode: "Men Who Care: Part 2" |
| 1971 | Columbo | Col. Roger Dutton | episode: "Dead Weight" |
| 1972 | The Longest Night | Agent Jones | |
| 1972 | The Rookies | Price | episode: "Time Is the Fire" |
| 1972–73 | The Mod Squad | Dr. Freilich / Dr. Eggers | 2 episodes |
| 1973 | Incident on a Dark Street | Gallagher | |
| 1973 | Alias Smith and Jones | George Sterling | episode: "Only Three to a Bed" |
| 1973 | Search | Senator Gordon | episode: "The Mattson Papers" |
| 1973–76 | Police Story | Various | 5 episodes |
| 1973–77 | The Streets of San Francisco | Gerald O'Brien | recurring role |
| 1974 | Barnaby Jones | Dr. Lincoln | episode: "Programmed for Killing" |
| 1975 | The Invisible Man | Kirk | episode: "Eyes Only" |
| 1975 | Medical Story | Dr. Barrett | episode: "A Life in the Balance" |
| 1976 | The Blue Knight | | episode: "Throwaway" |
| 1977 | McMillan & Wife | Richard Valentine | episode: "Affair of the Heart" |
| 1977 | The Feather and Father Gang | Martin Stoddard | episode: "The Mayan Connection" |
| 1977 | Washington: Behind Closed Doors | Ashton | miniseries, 1 episode |
| 1982 | Seeing Things | | episode: "In the Eyes of the Law" |
| 1983 | Sons and Daughters | Police Officer | episode #1.278 |
| 1985 | The Park Is Mine | Reporter | |
| 1989 | The Magistrate | Miller | miniseries, 2 episodes |
