= Bernardine (play) =

Bernardine is a play by Mary Chase. It premiered at the Playhouse Theatre on Broadway on October 16, 1952. It closed on February 28, 1953 after 157 performances. Actors John Kerr and Johnny Stewart won Theatre World Awards for their performances in the production. The play was later adapted into a 1957 film.
