= Tea and Sympathy (film) =

1956 film by Vincente Minnelli

- Theatrical release poster
- Directed by: Vincente Minnelli
- Screenplay by: Robert Anderson
- Based on: Tea and Sympathy; 1953 play by Robert Anderson
- Produced by: Pandro S. Berman
- Starring: Deborah Kerr; John Kerr; Leif Erickson; Edward Andrews
- Cinematography: John Alton
- Edited by: Ferris Webster
- Music by: Adolph Deutsch
- Production company: Metro-Goldwyn-Mayer
- Distributed by: Loew's Inc.
- Release date: September 27, 1956
- Running time: 122 minutes
- Country: United States
- Language: English
- Budget: $1,737,000
- Box office: $3,445,000

Tea and Sympathy is a 1956 American drama film and an adaptation of Robert Anderson's 1953 stage play of the same name directed by Vincente Minnelli and produced by Pandro S. Berman for MGM in Metrocolor. The music score was by Adolph Deutsch and the cinematography by John Alton. Deborah Kerr, John Kerr and Leif Erickson reprised their original Broadway roles. Edward Andrews, Darryl Hickman, Norma Crane, Tom Laughlin, and Dean Jones were featured in supporting roles.

== Plot ==
Seventeen-year-old Tom Robinson Lee (John Kerr), a new senior at a boy's prep school, finds himself at odds with the macho culture of his class in which the other boys love sports, roughhouse, fantasize about girls, and worship their coach, Bill Reynolds (Leif Erickson). Tom prefers classical music, reads Candida, goes to the theater, and generally seems to be more at ease in the company of women.

The other boys torment Tom for his "unmanly" qualities and call him "sister boy", and he is treated unfeelingly by his father, Herb Lee (Edward Andrews), who believes a man should be manly and that his son should fit in with the other boys. Only Al (Darryl Hickman), his roommate, treats Tom with any decency, perceiving that being different is not the same as being unmasculine. This growing tension is observed by Laura Reynolds (Deborah Kerr), wife of the coach. Laura tries to build a connection with Tom, often inviting him alone to tea, and eventually falls in love with him, in part because of his many similarities to her first husband, John, who was killed in World War II.

The situation escalates when Tom is goaded into visiting the local prostitute, Ellie (Norma Crane), to dispel suspicions about his sexuality, but things go badly. Her mockery and derision at his naïveté cause him to attempt suicide in the woman's kitchen. His father arrives from the city to meet with the dean about Tom's impending expulsion, having been alerted to Tom's intentions by a classmate. Assuming his son's success, he boasts of his son's sexual triumph and time-honored leap into manhood until the Reynoldses inform him otherwise. Laura goes in search of Tom and finds him where he often goes to ruminate, near the golf course's sixth tee. She tries to comfort him, counseling that he will have a wife and family some day, but he is inconsolable. She starts to leave, then returns and takes his hand, they kiss, and she says, "Years from now, when you talk about this, and you will, be kind."

Ten years into the future the adult Tom, now a successful married writer, returns to his prep school. The final scene shows Tom visiting his old coach and house master to ask after Laura. Bill tells him that he last heard she is out west somewhere but he has a note from Laura to Tom, which she enclosed in her last letter to Bill. Tom opens it outside and learns that she wrote it after reading his published novel, derived from his time at the school and their relationship. After their moment of passion, she tells Tom she had no choice but to leave Bill, and, as Tom wrote in his book, "The wife always kept her affection for the boy."

== Cast ==
- Deborah Kerr as Laura Reynolds
- John Kerr as Tom Robinson Lee
- Leif Erickson as Bill Reynolds
- Edward Andrews as Herb Lee
- Darryl Hickman as Al
- Norma Crane as Ellie Martin
- Dean Jones as Ollie
- Jacqueline deWit as Lilly Sears
- Tom Laughlin as Ralph
- Ralph Votrian as Steve
- Steven Terrell as Phil
- Kip King as Ted
- Jimmy Hayes as Henry
- Dick Tyler as Roger
- Don Burnett as Vic

== Production ==
=== Pre-production ===
Tea and Sympathy premiered on Broadway in 1953 and ran over 700 performances. Directed by Elia Kazan, and written by Robert Anderson, the play starred Deborah Kerr as Laura, the wife of a schoolmaster who becomes affectionate towards Tom, a young student at her husband Bill's all-boys prep school, who is accused of being a homosexual. In a generous gesture, Laura dedicates herself to help enable Tom's masculinity. Dore Schary, MGM's head of production, had seen the play after it opened, and pursued the film rights. However, Loew's, Inc., the parent company of MGM, were reluctant to acquire the property unless it was approved by the Production Code Administration (PCA), then headed by Geoffrey Shurlock and Jack Vizzard.

Upon MGM's request, in October 1953, Shurlock and Vizzard attended a Broadway performance of the play with half of their expenses paid by the studio. When they returned to Culver City, California, Schary was told that the play, in its present form, was unacceptable for the screen. Due to the PCA regulations, homosexuality could not be mentioned in the film version. On October 20, 1953, Vizzard met with Anderson and Elia Kazan to discuss the obstacles it would take to adapt the play into a film. Anderson stated that he would not change any of the "offending" elements. During the following months, several revisions were suggested to Shurlock, including making the character Bill Reynolds seem threatened by Tom's interest in Laura, rather than titillated by him; adding a punishment for Tom and Laura, and clarifying that Tom is not a homosexual but is merely different from the other boys.

In December 1953, Anderson told Variety he was considering forming an independent company that would produce a film adaptation without a Code seal. He stated, "I want to make an honest picture. I'm not out to offend anyone. I want to prove that a pure story, well done, can be done pure on the screen." By April 1954, Anderson told The New York Times that bids for the film rights from several major Hollywood studios were "brisk." He nevertheless expressed optimism that an independent producer would acquire the rights, with the production to be filmed on the East Coast.

On July 19, 1954, MGM optioned the film rights to the play for $100,000. Anderson would be paid $200,000, in addition to his down payment, provided he write a script which was approved under the Code. Three days later, MGM received a note from the Catholic Legion of Decency, which warned of the consequences unless the adaptation was purged of the references to homosexuality. On New Year's Eve 1955, Pandro S. Berman talked with his frequent collaborator Vincente Minnelli about directing Tea and Sympathy before the latter left for Europe to film Lust for Life (1956). Anderson, who was adapting his own play, was placated to downplay any elements in the script that smacked of "sexual perversion" as long as Tom and Laura's adulterous affair remained.

At the time, Bob Thomas of the Associated Press wrote that "many said [the play] could never be made into a movie." Anderson sanitized his play to remove references to homosexuality. However, Laura's relationship with Tom was considered adulterous, and therefore, was also in violation of the Code's guidelines. Anderson then restructured his script to have the central drama told in flashback, with an epilogue to explain what had happened to Laura after Tom left the school. Deborah Kerr, who reprised her role as Laura, said that the screenplay "contains all the best elements of the play. After all, the play was about the persecution of a minority, wasn't it? That still remains the theme of the film."

By September 1955, after a year of discussions and rewriting, Anderson's revised script was approved by Shurlock. Anderson told Variety: "It wasn't easy, but I think we've solved it to everyone's satisfaction. When the film is made, its dramatic ingredients will be all there. It is still a story about what is manhood and what is persecution."

=== Casting ===
Deborah Kerr, John Kerr (no relation), and Leif Erickson reprised their roles from the original Broadway production. Deborah expressed concerns the adaptation would be censored, in a letter she wrote to Minnelli:

"Adultery is o.k.—impotence is o.k. but perversion is their bête noire!!...It really is a play about persecution of the individual, and compassion and pity and love of one human being for another in crisis. And as such can stand alone I think—without the added problem of homosexuality. But above all—it needs a sensitive and compassionate person to make it—and that is why I'm so thrilled at the prospect of your doing it."

However, Dick York was unavailable to reprise his role as Tom's roommate. Jack Larson met with Minnelli to discuss the part. Minnelli was impressed with Larson, but at Anderson's recommendation, the part was given to Darryl Hickman.

=== Filming ===
Principal photography began in March 1956. According to Hickman, during production, Minnelli endlessly obsessed over the visual details in one scene. He arranged various different props on set, including a bust of Beethoven, and instructed the actors to perform with minimal hand gestures. He stated, "It looks artificial to me when I watch myself doing it." Filming wrapped after seven weeks, which was the shortest shooting schedule of any of Minnelli's dramatic films.

== Release ==
After a sneak preview of Tea and Sympathy, the Legion of Decency threatened to give the film a "C" rating ("Condemned") unless an epilogue was amended to stress Tom's guilt in the affair. Meanwhile, the Motion Picture Association of America (MPAA) demanded a six-line cut during a love scene, which MGM reduced to four. Under immense pressure, Berman cabled to Arthur Loew Jr., the head of MGM's New York office: "We are being treated badly and taken advantage of. The last reel of this picture will be ridiculous and in my opinion, should be laughed at by audiences."

Already preoccupied with his next film Designing Woman (1957), Minnelli wrote in a memo to Berman that he applauded Berman's uncompromising stance: "I know the pains that were taken to satisfy the representatives of the Code ... and to treat this subject in a manner which would not offend their standards, while still not distorting or cheapening a fine and distinguished play."

In response, Schary met with the Legion of Decency and satisfied them with the recommended pre-release changes. The Legion reconsidered their position and requested that Laura should die after she divorced her husband as punishment for the extramarital affair. Back in New York, Schary debated with Loew Jr., who insisted for the film to have the Legion's seal of approval. Anderson complained: "If we give in on this, for me, I never want to see the picture again and will consider it a very sad and sour conclusion to an otherwise wonderful experience." To their relief, the Legion gave the film a "B" rating ("Morally Questionable in Part for All").

On September 27, 1956, Tea and Sympathy premiered at the Radio City Music Hall.

== Reception ==
=== Box office ===
According to MGM records, Tea and Sympathy earned $2,145,000 in the U.S., and Canada and $1.3 million in other markets, resulting in a loss of $220,000.

=== Critical reaction ===
Bosley Crowther of The New York Times gave the film a positive review and felt the movie was faithful to the play despite the obvious alterations. However, Crowther felt the film's addition of a post-script featuring "an apologetic letter from the 'fallen woman'" was "preachy ... prudish and unnecessary", and recommended that cinemagoers leave after the line: "Years from now, when you talk about this—and you will—be kind." Gene Arneel of Variety called the film adaptation "a fine translation" from the stage, which kept "the essentials in proper focus." He further praised John Kerr for portraying his role "with marked credibility" and stated Deborah Kerr was "strikingly effective." Harrison's Reports called the film "an outstanding drama that should be well received in situations where its off-beat subject matter will be acceptable." The performances of Deborah and John Kerr were also praised for having brought "to the characterizations a sensitivity that wins the spectator's sympathy."

John McCarten of The New Yorker praised the cast and felt Tea and Sympathy was "an excellent screen adaptation of the play of the same name that was such a success on Broadway three years ago. Directed by Vincente Minnelli and written by Robert Anderson, who was the author of the play, the picture handles a difficult theme with noteworthy finesse." Philip K. Scheuer of the Los Angeles Times opened his review, stating Robert Anderson "has patiently revised and reworked into a film that should prove highly acceptable to adult audiences, particularly of the feminine gender. It is made sensitive and touching through the portrayals of John Kerr as the boy and Deborah Kerr, who just happens to bear the same surname, as the woman who befriends him".

Time magazine called the film "basically just a darn good matinee drama, and the tremendous excitement it generated in audiences was mostly Freudulent." However, they were less complimentary of Leif Erikson and John Kerr's performances, but felt "Deborah Kerr, on the other hand, is excellent: always in scale, always in key." The Chicago Tribune praised the cast as "uniformly excellent, led by Deborah Kerr, who makes her Laura gentle, patrician, and truly feminine. John Kerr gives a brilliant performance as the pathetic Tom, and Darryl Hickman, as a sympathetic but inarticulate student is remarkably good."

Deborah Kerr said in regard to the screenplay that "I think Robert Anderson has done a fine job." On the review aggregator website Rotten Tomatoes, 82% of 11 critics' reviews are positive, with an average rating of 7.5/10.

The film is recognized by American Film Institute in these lists:

- 2002: AFI's 100 Years...100 Passions – Nominated
- 2005: AFI's 100 Years...100 Movie Quotes:
  - Laura Reynolds: "Years from now, when you talk about this -- and you will -- be kind." – Nominated

== See also ==
- List of American films of 1956

== Bibliography ==
- Griffin, Mark (2010). A Hundred or More Hidden Things: The Life and Films of Vincente Minnelli. Cambridge, MA: Da Capo Press. ISBN 978-0-7867-2099-6.
- Harvey, Stephen (1989). Directed by Vincente Minnelli. New York: Museum of Modern Art; Harper & Row. ISBN 978-0-87070-474-1.
- Levy, Emmanuel (2009). Vincente Minnelli: Hollywood's Dark Dreamer. New York: St. Martins Press. ISBN 978-0-312-32925-9.
- Minnelli, Vincente; Arce, Hector (1974). I Remember it Well. Garden City: Doubleday. ISBN 0-385-09522-8.
- Schary, Dore (1979). Heyday: An Autobiography. Boston: Little, Brown and Company. ISBN 0-316-77270-4.
