= Waterloo Bridge (play) =

Waterloo Bridge: A play in two acts is a 1930 play by Robert E. Sherwood. It premiered on Broadway January 6, 1930 and ran until March 1930. It was the basis for three separate films: Waterloo Bridge (1931), Waterloo Bridge (1940), and Gaby (1956). It is based on the author's experiences during World War I.

== Plot ==
American chorus girl Myra Deauville is stuck in 1917 London at the height of World War I, unable to find work and book passage home. She resorts to prostitution to support herself. She meets her clients on Waterloo Bridge, the primary entry point into the city for soldiers on leave. There she meets fellow American Roy Cronin, a young soldier in the Canadian Army on convalescent leave after being wounded in France, and impressed by his innocence, invites him to her apartment for tea instead of soliciting his business. Afterwards she sends him away. The next day Myra's friend and neighbor Kitty finds Roy waiting for Myra in her room. Unaware that Kitty is also a prostitute and that their landlady, Mrs. Hobley, has been forced to run her house as a brothel because her husband is a prisoner-of-war, Roy is persuaded that Myra needs his protection.

Kitty hints that Roy should ask Myra to marry him and tries to convince Myra to accept a proposal, justifying the idea as an expedient of survival. Rationalizing that Myra will make a soldier happy for a few days, Kitty tells her that she owes it to herself as an honest resolution to a predicament she did not create. Mrs. Hobley learns that Roy is flush with back pay and encourages Myra so Roy will pay her delinquent rent. The gullible Roy is worried that he will be sent to Camp Bramshott at any moment to prepare for return to the front and proposes. Myra accepts, but then sneaks away when she feels guilty. Restored to duty, Roy assigns part of his pay to her and names her as the beneficiary of his life insurance. Mrs. Hobley, in need of self-justification, tells Roy that her "Christian duty" compels her to warn him that Myra is a "harlot". Roy accepts the truth as a reality of the times and rejects her warning. Crossing the bridge on his way to the railway station, he meets Myra again and makes her promise to accept the allotment and sign for the life insurance benefit. After he leaves for Bramshott, Myra remains on the bridge, lighting a cigarette, just as a German air raid begins, and she is killed.

== Production ==
Sherwood based his play on his own wartime experience of a chance meeting with an American chorus girl in London in November 1918. Recovering from wounds in battle, Sherwood had gone to Trafalgar Square to join the celebration of the armistice ending the war and found himself next to "a very short and very pretty girl" wearing a small silk American flag pinned to her blouse. The girl described her circumstances as similar to those later attributed to Myra and invited Sherwood to her flat, but he forgot her address and never met her again. Sherwood, through Roy, expressed his realization that Myra and others like her were civilian victims of war.

The Broadway production was a two-act two-set play (the bridge and Myra's flat) that opened on January 6, 1930 at the Fulton Theatre, where it ran for only 64 performances. Despite the fact it was neither a critical nor commercial success, film producer Carl Laemmle, Jr. considered it a prestige project and purchased the film rights for Universal Pictures.
