= There Shall Be No Night =

1940 play by Robert E. Sherwood

- First edition 1940
- Original language: English
- Written by: Robert E. Sherwood
- Genre: Drama

Premiere
- Date: April 29, 1940
- Place: Alvin Theatre; New York City

There Shall Be No Night is a three-act play written by the American playwright Robert E. Sherwood.

== Production ==
The play was presented by the Theatre Guild on Broadway at the Alvin Theatre (now renamed the Neil Simon Theater), from April 29 through November 2, 1940. (The play ran from April 29, 1940 – August 9, 1940, and again from September 9, 1940 – November 2, 1940.)

Directed by Alfred Lunt, the cast starred Lunt (Dr. Kaarlo Valkonen), Lynn Fontanne (Miranda Valkonen), Charles Ansley (Joe Burnett), and Montgomery Clift (Erik Valkonen).

The play won the 1941 Pulitzer Prize for Drama.

== Overview ==
The title comes from a passage in the Book of Revelation (22:5) which is quoted by Lunt's character in Act 3, Scene 6: There shall be no night there: They need no lamp nor light of the sun, for the Lord God gives them light...

The play is set in Finland between 1938 and 1940 and concerns a Nobel Prize-winning Finnish scientist (portrayed by Alfred Lunt, whose own stepfather was a Finnish-born physician) and his American-born wife (portrayed by Lynn Fontanne), both of whom are reluctant to believe that the Russians will invade their beloved Finland. But with the final advent of Finland's Winter War with the Soviets, their son Erik joins the Finnish army, and the scientist joins its medical corps. John Mason Brown wrote “No one can complain about the theatre's being an escapist institution when it conducts a class in current events at once as touching, intelligent and compassionate as There Shall Be No Night.”

According to William L. Shirer, Sherwood was inspired to write the play by William Lindsay White's moving Christmas broadcast from the Finnish front during the Winter War and his columns for the New York Post. The son of journalist William Allen White, the younger White had been sent there by CBS to report on that war. Sherwood bases his American journalist (portrayed by Richard Whorf) in this play upon W. L. White, substantiating this in his preface to the first published edition by Charles Scribner's Sons in 1940.

== Television ==
Fox bought the film rights for $100,000.

Katharine Cornell produced and starred in a television version of the play in 1957 on The Hallmark Hall of Fame with Charles Boyer, Bradford Dillman and Ray Walston. This TV version was reset in Hungary in 1956 (changing the names from their original Finnish) in order to reflect current events in the same way that its original had done.

== Radio adaptation ==
There Shall Be No Night was presented on Star Playhouse on November 29, 1953. The adaptation starred Fredric March and Florence Eldridge.
