= Darlene Conley =

American actress

- Born: July 18, 1934; Ireland
- Died: January 14, 2007 (aged 72); Los Angeles, California, U.S.
- Years active: 1954–2006
- Spouse(s): Bill Woodson (1959–1966) (divorced); Kurt Hensch (1970–1981) (divorced)
- Children: 1

Darlene Conley (July 18, 1934 – January 14, 2007) was an American actress. Conley's career spanned fifty years, but she was best known for her performances in daytime television, and in particular, for her portrayal of larger-than-life fashion industrialist Sally Spectra on The Bold and the Beautiful. Conley played the role from 1989 until her death 17 years later. Darlene's character Sally is the only American soap opera character to be displayed at Madame Tussaud's wax figures galleries in Amsterdam and Las Vegas.

== Life and career ==
Conley, an Irish American, was born in Ireland, the daughter of Melba (née Manthey) and Raymond Conley. She began her acting career at age 15 when she was cast in the touring production of the Broadway play The Heiress. After graduating from high school, she appeared in several stage productions, including Cyrano de Bergerac, The Baker's Wife and Night of the Iguana. In the late 1950s and early 1960s, Conley was employed with the traveling theater group the Chicago Uptown Circuit Players and Playwrights Company and on Broadway with the Helen Hayes Repertory Theater.

In 1963, Conley landed a bit part in the movie The Birds, which was followed by similar small roles in movies like Valley of the Dolls and Lady Sings the Blues. On television, Conley appeared in a number of made-for-television movies and guest-starred on prime time shows including Ironside, The Bill Cosby Show and Gunsmoke. She also appeared in the first episode of the fifth season of The Mary Tyler Moore Show as a prison warden. Conley appeared on Little House on the Prairie in 1981, in the episode entitled "A Wiser Heart."

=== Daytime television ===
Conley's performance as Rose DeVille on the daytime soap opera The Young and the Restless followed, with Conley playing many small roles on other soaps for most of the 1980s. She was the tough but basically decent prison warden Edith Hopkins on Days of Our Lives in 1983 during Liz Chandler's incarceration for Marie Horton's shooting. As Trixie on General Hospital from 1984 to 1988, she was an old hooker pal of Ruby's who worked at Kelly's. Her role as Rose De Ville on The Young and the Restless inspired William J. Bell to cast her as flamboyant fashion maven Sally Spectra on his newer serial, The Bold and the Beautiful. She earned two Outstanding Supporting Actress Daytime Emmy and six Soap Opera Digest Awards nominations for her role.

She was friends with several actors who appeared on "B&B", including Fabio, who has appeared on the show several times, usually under the guise of celebrating Sally's birthday. She was also friends with Phyllis Diller, who also appeared on the show as Sally's friend, Gladys Pope.

=== Illness and death ===
Conley became ill in 2004 due to a fall that broke several bones. She recovered from the fall and returned to work (although she was usually seated during her scenes). Reports surfaced in the media in the fall of 2006 that Conley had surgery and received treatment for stomach cancer. Conley died on January 14, 2007. B&B featured a tribute to Conley; John McCook presented the tribute, which featured her memorable moments on the show.

On The Bold and the Beautiful, Sally Spectra remained a character. Sally's absence was explained by her son CJ telling his father, Clarke (and viewers), that Sally had taken a permanent vacation in St. Tropez. Head writer Brad Bell said that Sally is "bigger than life" and will live on forever.

In late 2007, Sally decided to sell her fashion house. Nick Marone and Jackie Marone bought Spectra and ran the company; in a later story in 2017, the show revisited many of the storylines of Sally Spectra to introduce a new younger character, also named Sally, who is the niece of the original Sally Spectra. The younger Spectra relaunched the house of Spectra fashion line. In addition, the show brought back the character of CJ to appear in several episodes.

== Filmography ==
Year	Title	Role	Notes
1963	The Birds	Waitress	
1967	Valley of the Dolls	Nurse in Sanitarium	
1968	Faces	Billy Mae	
1970	Ironside	Landlady	Episode: "A Killing Will Occur"
1970	The Name of the Game	Blanche Reid	Episode: "A Love to Remember"
1970	The Bill Cosby Show	Market Cashier	Episode: "The Old Man of 4-C"
1970	Gunsmoke	Leelah Case	Episode: " Gentry's Law"
1970	Captain Milkshake	Mrs. Hamilton	
1971	Longstreet	Mrs. Benbrook	Episode: "A World of Perfect Complicity"
1971	Minnie and Moskowitz	uncredited	
1972	Lady Sings the Blues	uncredited	
1972	Play It as It Lays	Kate's Nurse	
1972	Ghost Story	Ruth Jerrold	Episode: "The Summer House"
1973	Gentle Savage	Mac Moody	
1973	The President's Plane Is Missing	uncredited	
1974	Get Christie Love!	Virginia	
1974	The Mary Tyler Moore Show	Matron	Episode: "Will Mary Richards Go to Jail?"
1978	Return Engagement	Aide	
1979	The Stingiest Man in Town	Mrs. Cratchit	Voice
1979	Rudolph and Frosty's Christmas in July	Mrs. Claus	
1979	The Jeffersons	Mother	Episode: "The Other Woman"
1979–80; 1986–87	The Young and the Restless	Rose DeVille	Recurring role
1981	The Choice	Marilyn	
1981	The Nashville Grab	Rooney	
1981	Little House on the Prairie	Mrs. Pierce	Episode: "A Wiser Heart"
1983	The Fighter	Mrs. MacCauley	
1983	Cagney & Lacey	Charge Nurse	Episode: "Burn Out"
1983	I Want to Live	Miss Bain	
1983	Days of Our Lives	Warden Edith Baker	Recurring role
1984	Capitol	Louise	Recurring role
1985	Robert Kennedy and His Times	Moderator	Miniseries
1985	Murder, She Wrote	Mims	Episode: "Jessica Behind Bars"
1986	Tough Guys	Gladys Ripps	
1987	Scarecrow and Mrs. King	Jenkins	Episode: "The Khrushchev List"
1987	Highway to Heaven	Mrs. Parker	Episode: "In with the 'In' Crowd"
1984–1988	General Hospital	Trixie Monahan	Recurring role
1988–2006	The Bold and the Beautiful	Sally Spectra	Series regular, 1558 episodes Nominated — Daytime Emmy Award for Outstanding Supporting Actress in a Drama Series (1991–1992); Nominated — Soap Opera Digest Award for Outstanding Comic Actress: Daytime (1990, 1993); Nominated — Soap Opera Digest Award for Outstanding Scene Stealer (1994); Nominated — Soap Opera Digest Award for Outstanding Female Showstopper (1997); Nominated — Soap Opera Digest Award for Outstanding Supporting Actress: Daytime (1991–1992)
1997	The Oz Kids	Mombi (voice)	Episode "The Return of Mombi"
1998	Pittige tijden	Sally Spectra	Episode
