= Lovers Courageous =

1932 film

- Directed by: Robert Z. Leonard
- Screenplay by: Frederick Lonsdale
- Produced by: Robert Z. Leonard; Harry Rapf
- Starring: Robert Montgomery; Madge Evans; Roland Young; Frederick Kerr; Reginald Owen; Beryl Mercer
- Cinematography: William H. Daniels
- Edited by: Margaret Booth
- Production company: Metro-Goldwyn-Mayer
- Distributed by: Loew's Inc.
- Release date: January 23, 1932
- Running time: 77 minutes
- Country: United States
- Language: English

Lovers Courageous is a 1932 American pre-Code drama film directed by Robert Z. Leonard and written by Frederick Lonsdale. The film stars Robert Montgomery, Madge Evans, Roland Young, Frederick Kerr, Reginald Owen and Beryl Mercer. It follows the romance of an admiral’s daughter and a struggling playwright jumping from job to job. The film was released on January 23, 1932, by Metro-Goldwyn-Mayer.

== Plot ==
In 1919 London, 12-year-old Willie Smith (Jackie Searl) gets into mischief and is called out for having "too much imagination". He cuts school by forging a letter to the headmaster, claiming his father is ill and he is needed at home. Willie's father (Halliwell Hobbes) is horrified, and says he doesn't want a son who is "different from other boys" - even going so far as to threaten to break "every bone in [Willie's] body". Willie arrives home after being out all day and his father whips him with a belt, but still Willie is undeterred - he will not be like the "other boys" and will instead do something different with his life than what is expected.

The film cuts to present day and we see a now adult Willie (Robert Montgomery) in the crow's nest of a ship during a terrible storm. We learn that he jumps from job to job, never staying in one place too long, working in New York and then in Toronto. He writes home to share of his adventures, always making his jobs seem more important than they actually are. Willie's mother (Beryl Mercer) is convinced that he'll be a "great man" someday, but his father thinks very little of him. Willie's two brothers appear to have gone into more conventional careers, and they agree that Willie will not amount to much.

Willie is fired from a hotel job in Canada, and he begins to work as a cowboy. However, he runs out on that job when he is instructed to corral a loose bull. He tells his fellow cowboys that he is off to South Africa instead.

On the Royal Naval Base in Simon's Town, South Africa, we meet Mary Blayne (Madge Evans), who has just gotten into an argument with her father, Admiral Blayne (Frederick Kerr). Mary hates being in South Africa and wishes to leave, but her mother won't be leaving for at least six weeks. She talks about finding life to be terribly dull, and she wishes she had more to be excited about and to look forward to.

Mary leaves the base and goes into a shop where she meets Willie, who has just recently been hired as an assistant there. They get to talking, and she is amused by his outlook on life. They have an immediate connection, but she quickly leaves the shop when other customers arrive. The customers tell Willie that Mary is engaged to "a Lord somebody-or-other in England." Still, he is undeterred, as he is enamored with her.

Mary seems smitten by Willie, too, but there are complications. Not only is Mary engaged to Jimmy (Reginald Owen), but she also has a rapport with an officer on the naval base named Jeffrey (Roland Young). Jeffrey works closely with Admiral Blayne and is with the family every day. Jeffrey pays attention to Mary and notices something has suddenly changed about her - that she is no longer bored or frustrated at being in South Africa as she once was.

Soon, Mary and Willie begin spending more and more time together. Mary learns that Willie is writing a play, and she encourages him to follow his dream to be a playwright. She promises that no matter where life takes her, she will be at the opening night of Willie's first production. They start practicing scenes from his play together, and they begin to fall in love. Mary is dishonest with her family about where she is spending all of her time, pretending that her car has broken down while on a drive or that she's too ill to go out on calls with her mother. Jeffrey becomes suspicious that Mary is seeing another man. He goes into the shop one day and meets Willie and is able to put two and two together. He finally confirms his suspicions when he is taking the Blayne family dog out for a walk late one night and he sees Willie and Mary arriving after spending the evening together. After some agonizing, Jeffrey decides to tell Mary's parents what is going on. He tells them that he struggled with whether or not to say something because he does not believe that Willie is a bad person - in fact, he urges Admiral Blayne not to confront Mary in order to keep their secret from being revealed. Instead, he suggests that they send Mary back to England, which was her original request to her father in the first place.

Mary's mother, Lady Blayne (Evelyn Hall) pretends that Mary's Aunt Margaret is "very ill" and asks Mary to return with her to England at once. She guilts Mary into the decision, but Mary is clearly upset at the thought of leaving Willie. That night, Mary goes on her evening walk with Willie and she breaks the bad news. They are both brokenhearted, and Mary offers to throw her engagement ring - given to her by another man - in the lake. Willie asks her not to. He says she doesn't have the courage to do it, and even if she did, he wouldn't let her. He expresses regret that he could never offer her the kind of financial support and comfort that her fiancée can. Mary tells Willie that she will give everything up for him, and he asks her to go home and sleep on it. He tells her that if she does decide to get on the ship the next morning, he won't blame her for it.

Mary decides to sail with her mother, and Jeffrey goes with them. Willie mournfully watches the ship leave the dock, and Mary tearfully regrets her decision to go. When they arrive in England, Jimmy is at the dock to greet them, and Mary prepares herself to return to the status quo: life will be boring and dull and she'll have to do what's expected of her by marrying Jimmy because he is wealthy. Although she tries to keep busy on Jimmy's estate, going riding and attending luncheons, she can't shake her feelings for Willie. She is deeply unhappy, and Jeffrey tries to provide some hope - he casually implies to Mary that if she weds Jimmy, within a few years of their marriage she may be able to pursue an affair with another man. Whether Mary understands his implication or not, it doesn't change her mood. When the Admiral returns to England, even he remarks that Mary doesn't appear to be a happy bride-to-be.

Meanwhile, Willie has left South Africa and returns to England, where he lives in poverty but continues working on his play. His mother implores him to live at home, but Willie does not want to be under the scrutiny of his father and brothers. Willie has not stopped pining for Mary, and he sends her a gift to let her know he is thinking of her - a little box of the same brand of cigarettes she purchased from him in the shop in South Africa. With the gift was a note: "Mary dear, the only value this little present has is the thought that I send with it. The shop went bust and I lost my $2.00 a week. But I am still struggling to write the play you believe I will. Good bye! My prayers are only for your happiness. Willie."

Mary decides to go to Willie now that she has his address. She shows up one morning and can't contain herself - she proposes immediately. She confesses to being in love with him and tells him that she knows exactly what she's done and what she's giving up. However, their happiness is short-lived when they learn that the Admiral followed Mary to Willie's apartment. The Admiral implores Mary not to marry Willie, but she refuses to give him up. The Admiral makes it clear that he won't help support the couple financially. However, he tells Mary that when she eventually leaves Willie, poor and starving, he'll take her back willingly.

The couple marries, and the months pass. Jeffrey is still working for the Blaynes, and he asks them if they've heard from Mary - they haven't. Jeffrey expresses his hope that Willie's play will soon be produced, but the Admiral insists that he is certain it will never happen. He tells Jeffrey and his wife that Mary will come back to them - "starving, and hating [Willie]."

The Admiral is right about the couple starving - while they are happily in love, their financial position has become precarious. Mary remains upbeat, but she has to sell their car in order to keep them fed and in their apartment. Willie is devastated and insists that he'll give up the play and go look for a real job. However, Mary won't let him - she believes in him and his writing too much. She asks him if he's losing his courage, and he says that he isn't - he is just worried about her. Willie tells Mary that the only thing he is terrified of is failing her. She promises him that he won't. Still, that doesn't change their situation. Mary continues to pawn her belongings to keep them afloat. When the landlady barges in one day, insisting on getting her rent and telling Willie that they'll be out by the end of the week, he pounds the pavement looking for work. Again and again, he hears that no one is hiring, and instead, people are being laid off. He ducks into a butcher shop and in a moment of weakness, he steals a steak. When he gets home, he lies and tells Mary that he got a temporary job and they feast on the stolen meal. While basking in the bliss of their stomachs being full for the first time in a long time, Mary asks Willie where he stole the meat. She wasn't fooled by his lie.

When the end of the week arrives and the rent is due, Willie and Mary quarrel. He tells her he's done and he demands that she go back to her father - "tell him he was right!" Mary says she would rather die than admit her mistake and Willie's failure. Willie jumps on that word - "mistake" - and Mary says that if Willie sends her home she'll never speak to him again. The fight turns into a tearful Mary begging Willie's forgiveness and explaining that she wouldn't be so emotional if she weren't so tired and hungry. Willie reassures Mary that everything will be alright, and tells her he knows someone who will lend him the money.

Willie doesn't tell Mary, but he goes to the Admiral and admits he was right. Willie insists that the Admiral come get Mary or he will abandon her to "walk the streets all night". The Admiral is furious and says that Willie should be ashamed of himself. Willie says that just by his showing up, the Admiral should know that he is. The Admiral agrees to take Mary back on one condition: that Willie leave her alone and never come near her again. Willie tries to resist but knows the situation is too dire, so he acquiesces.

The Admiral picks up Mary. Willie watches them leave, hidden behind some bushes down the street.

A few weeks pass. Willie enters the office of a theater producer and he pushes his way into the man's private office without an appointment. He insists on knowing what the producer thinks of his play. The producer, Gerald Lamone (Alan Mowbray), has read it and likes it. But his partner, Mr. Belton, "hates it". Belton tells Willie that the play is too unbelievable - that a woman would never run away from her well-off family to marry a penniless man. Willie tells the men that it is indeed believable, because it is his life story. He expresses shame - he tells them that he gave up because he couldn't stand poverty, and he regrets losing Mary. He insists that the play must be produced so he can show Mary that their suffering was not in vain.

Belton leaves, still unconvinced that the play can be successful. Lamone, however, likes the play and wants to produce it, and he sits with Willie to discuss some modifications he wants to make to the script.

The film cuts to marquee lights. We see that Gerald Lamone has produced "William" Smith's play, entitled "Courage". It is the end of the first act, and Willie and his mother are standing outside, as he can't bring himself to sit and watch the performance. Meanwhile, Willie's father and brothers are watching the show, glued to the edge of their seats. Back outside, Willie and his mother are still pacing nervously when Jeffrey appears, telling Willie that he's been looking all over for him. Jeffrey reveals that Mary is gravely ill. Willie immediately leaves the theater to go to Mary. When he arrives, the Admiral is furious and insists that he leave, but Willie ignores him and runs to Mary's side.

Mary is in bed. When she sees Willie, she doesn't appear happy, and she tells Willie that she is hurt at how he "neglected" her so terribly. Willie tells her that he promised the Admiral he'd stay away. Mary is upset that Willie made such a promise. She demands that Willie never leave her again. She appears to be unaware about the play, but before Willie can tell her, Jeffrey phones. He tells them that the show is a great success. The audience gave it a five-minute standing ovation, and Lamone says it will run a year. Willie excitedly tells Mary that they should go away to Paris or Rome to celebrate, but she gently implies that they need to stay home so they can have a baby instead. They embrace.

== Cast ==
- Robert Montgomery as Willie
- Madge Evans as Mary
- Roland Young as Jeffrey
- Frederick Kerr as Admiral
- Reginald Owen as Jimmy
- Beryl Mercer as Mrs. Smith
- Evelyn Hall as Lady Blayne
- Halliwell Hobbes as Mr. Smith
- Jackie Searl as Willie as a Child
- Norman Phillips Jr. as Walter as a Child
- Alan Mowbray as Lamone
