= The Lady of Scandal =

1930 film

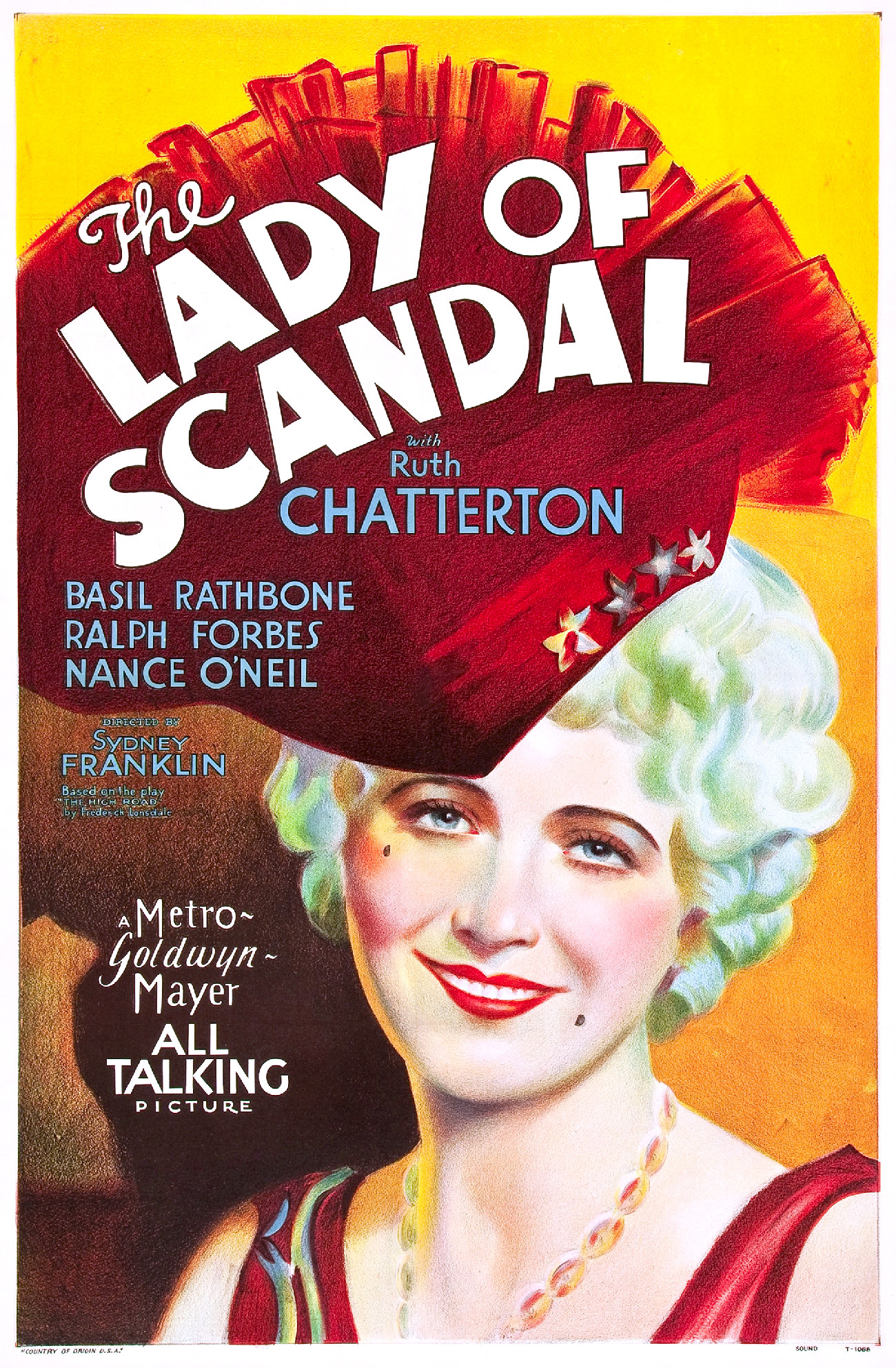
- Theatrical release poster
- Directed by: Sidney Franklin
- Written by: Claudine West; Edwin Justus Mayer
- Screenplay by: Hans Kraly
- Based on: The High Road; 1927 play by Frederick Lonsdale
- Starring: Ruth Chatterton; Basil Rathbone
- Cinematography: Oliver T. Marsh; Arthur Miller
- Edited by: Margaret Booth
- Distributed by: Metro-Goldwyn-Mayer
- Release date: May 24, 1930 (United States)
- Running time: 76 minutes
- Country: United States
- Language: English

The Lady of Scandal is a 1930 American pre-Code romance-comedy-drama film directed by Sidney Franklin, based on the 1927 play The High Road by Frederick Lonsdale, and starring Ruth Chatterton, Basil Rathbone and Ralph Forbes. Its plot follows a British actress who becomes involved with a member of an aristocratic family, who try desperately to thwart the match. It also is known by the alternative title The High Road.

== Plot ==
The Lady of Scandal (full film)

A nobleman risks his family's wrath by courting an actress. Elsie is the popular star of a musical comedy show in London. One of her admirers is Lord Teylesmore, who falls head in love with her. Every day for a year, he has asked her to marry him, and although she is fond of him, each time he proposes, Elsie rejects him. Hoping to force the issue, Lord Teylesmore, whose given name is John, places an ad in the newspaper announcing their engagement.

John's family is horrified to learn of his engagement to an entertainer. A diplomatic career of importance is intended for John, so an appropriate wife would be a woman from an aristocratic family.

Hoping to stop this marriage, Lord Crayle, John's father, sends Elsie a letter, offering her 5,000 pounds if she will break her engagement with John. Unfortunately for him, the attempt to buy her off only angers Elsie, and it makes her determined to go through with the marriage. John's father proceeds to convene a family council to help him deal with this family crisis. John's uncle and aunt, Lord and Lady Trench; his cousins, Alice and Ernest; Lady Minster, another aunt; and Sir Reginald Welby, also an uncle, all gather at the Crayle estate. Also present is John's favorite cousin Edward, the duke of Warrington.Basil Rathbone tribute page

== Cast ==
- Ruth Chatterton as Elsie
- Basil Rathbone as Edward
- Ralph Forbes as John
- Nance O'Neil as Lady Trench
- Frederick Kerr as Lord Trench
- Herbert Bunston as Lord Crayle
- Cyril Chadwick as Sir Reginald
- Effie Ellsler as Lady Minster
- Robert Bolder as Hilary
- Moon Carroll as Alice
- Mackenzie Ward as Ernest
- Edgar Norton as Morton

== Reception ==
Variety gave the film a positive review, saying, "Dry humor and high causticism, thought to be over the heads of the American masses, are getting more laughs, as handled in the Lonsdale lines, and by an exceptionally capable cast in this picture than in the average teaser comedy." The Film Daily called it a "fair programmer which will have to depend largely on star for drawing power. Cast and director did well with light material."
