= Tea and Sympathy (play) =

1953 play by Robert Anderson

- First edition (publ. Random House)
- Written by: Robert Anderson

Premiere
- Date: September 30, 1953
- Place: Ethel Barrymore Theatre, New York City
- Directed by: Elia Kazan

Tea and Sympathy is a 1953 stage play in three acts by Robert Anderson about a male private school student, Tom Lee, who faces accusations of homosexuality. A woman, Laura, who is married to an instructor, opposes the students' shaming of Lee and romantically pursues him so he can prove that he has a masculine character. The title refers to what someone in Laura's position was supposed to offer a boy such as Tom.

Writing in 2013, Everett Evans of the Houston Chronicle called it "one of the first plays to tackle the then-taboo topic of sexual orientation and related prejudice." Evans stated that the play's final line, "Years from now, when you speak of this, and you will, be kind", is "one of the most quoted curtain lines in stage history".

== Characters ==
- Tom Lee – A student at a New England preparatory school who is accused of being effeminate and is targeted after sunbathing with a male professor.
- Bill Reynolds – The head of Tom Lee's dormitory house, Bill is hyper-masculine and in conflict with Tom. He prefers activities with the boys to spending time with his wife, Laura, from whom he is distant. Everett Evans of the Houston Chronicle wrote that Bill married Laura "apparently" because colleagues pressured him into doing so, and that "The play suggests Bill's persecution of Tom stems from doubts about his own masculinity."
- Laura Reynolds – Bill's wife, Laura, assists Tom and helps him during his troubles.

== Productions ==
=== Broadway ===
The play premiered on Broadway at the Ethel Barrymore Theatre on September 30, 1953, in a production by The Playwrights' Company, directed by Elia Kazan with scenic and lighting design by Jo Mielziner. The play starred Deborah Kerr, Leif Erickson, and John Kerr, who won a Tony Award for his portrayal of Tom Lee. It transferred to the Longacre Theatre, and later the 48th Street Theatre. The play closed on June 18, 1955, after 712 performances. In the summer of 1954, Joan Fontaine and Anthony Perkins replaced Deborah Kerr and John Kerr in their respective roles.

=== London ===
The play was first performed in London at the Comedy Theatre (Harold Pinter Theatre since 2011), under membership conditions, because the Lord Chamberlain had imposed an outright ban. The New Watergate Club was founded in 1956 for the staging of plays previously suppressed under the Theatres Act 1843. By these means, the theatre premiered Tea and Sympathy in the United Kingdom.

=== Paris ===
A French adaptation was presented in 1956 at the Théâtre de Paris, Paris, starring Ingrid Bergman and Jean-Loup Phillipe and directed by Jean Mercure.

=== Off-Broadway ===
The play was presented Off-Broadway by the Keen Company at the Clurman Theater, from March 6, 2007, to April 14, 2007. Directed by Jonathan Silverstein, the cast featured Heidi Armbruster (Laura Reynolds), Dan McCabe (Tom Lee) and Craig Mathers (Bill Reynolds).

== Adaptations ==
The play was adapted into a 1956 film. In 1956, Bob Thomas of the Associated Press wrote that "many said [the play] could never be made into a movie."

== Reception ==
In his New York Times review of the original 1953 production, Brooks Atkinson called it an "uncommonly discerning study of character" and "the first big popular success of the season".

In 2013, Everett Evans of the Houston Chronicle wrote that "Sixty years on, this once controversial play is a little dated but a lot more timely; its potent moments outweigh its imperfections. When you speak of Tea and Sympathy, be kind."
