= Frederick Kerr =

British actor (1858–1933)

- Born: Frederick Grinham Keen; 11 October 1858; London, England
- Died: 3 May 1933 (aged 74); London, England
- Resting place: Golders Green Crematorium
- Occupations: Actor; theatrical manager
- Years active: 1882–1933
- Spouse: Lucy Dowson

Frederick Grinham Kerr (né Keen, 11 October 1858 – 3 May 1933) was an English actor who appeared on stage in both London and New York and in British and American films; he also worked as a major theatrical manager in London.

== Early life ==
Kerr was born Frederick Grinham Keen on 11 October 1858 in London, the elder son of Grinham Keen, a solicitor. He was educated at Charterhouse School and Caius College, Cambridge. After graduating from Cambridge in 1880, he enrolled at the Inner Temple with the intention of becoming a barrister, but left shortly afterwards to pursue a career as an actor.

== Theatre career ==
He went to New York City in 1880 and worked as a sketch artist, when sheer chance turned him into an actor. He was living in a boarding house on 7th Avenue, where a number of theatrical people also lived, among them Henry Miller, who eventually became his manager. Osmond Tearle, an actor living there, heard from his own producer that an Englishman was needed for a production of The School for Scandal. Tearle recruited Frederick, who got the part in January 1882 (which is also likely the moment he took the stage surname of "Kerr"). He appeared in several more plays in New York City that year, but left for Britain to appear in a London play in December 1882, after which he joined the company at the Royal Court Theatre managed by John Clayton and Arthur Cecil. Over the next fifty years, he travelled back and forth across the Atlantic several times for theatrical work both in New York City and in London.

Kerr became actor-manager of the Vaudeville Theatre in London in 1895 and later managed the Royal Court Theatre. He starred in Public Opinion at Wyndham's Theatre in 1905 and also as the titular pirate in George Bernard Shaw's Captain Brassbound's Conversion at the Court Theatre in 1906.

== Film career ==
In addition to his stage career, Kerr also appeared in 19 films between 1916 and 1933. He is best known as the old Baron Frankenstein in Frankenstein (1931).

=== Filmography ===
Year	Title	Role	Notes
1916	The Real Thing at Last	Murdered	Short
1916	The Lifeguardsman	Premier	
1918	Victory and Peace	Sir Richard Arkwright	
1919	12.10	Dr. Wrightman	
1930	The Lady of Scandal	Lord Trench	
1930	Raffles	Lord Harry Melrose	
1930	The Devil to Pay!	Lord Leland	
1931	Born to Love	Lord Ponsonby	
1931	Always Goodbye	Sir George Boomer	
1931	Waterloo Bridge	Major Wetherby	
1931	Friends and Lovers	General Thomas Armstrong	
1931	Honor of the Family	Paul Barony	
1931	Frankenstein	Baron Frankenstein	
1932	Lovers Courageous	Admiral	
1932	Beauty and the Boss	Count Von Tolheim	
1932	But the Flesh Is Weak	Duke of Hampshire	
1932	The Midshipmaid	Sir Percy Newbiggin	
1933	Lord of the Manor	Sir Henry Bovey	
1933	The Man from Toronto	Bunston	(final film role)

== Writing career ==
His memoirs were published in 1930 under the title Recollections of a Defective Memory.

== Personal life and death ==
Kerr married Lucy Houghton Dowson (b. 1864) in April 1894. They had three children: a son, Geoffrey Kemble Grinham Keen (1895–1971) who acted under the stage name Geoffrey Kerr; and two daughters, Lucy Joyce Gunning Keen (b. 1897) who married James Boswell Talbot, 3rd Baron Talbot de Malahide, and Frances Mary Keen (1904–1942), who was an actor and writer using the name Molly Kerr. His grandson was actor John Kerr.

Kerr was a heavy smoker and suffered from obesity in his later years. He died from the consequences of an earlier heart attack in a nursing home in London on 2 May 1933 at the age of 74. His interment was at Golders Green Crematorium.
