= All Summer Long (play) =

All Summer Long is a 1954 American play by Robert Anderson.

It was based on a Donald Wetzel novel A Wreath and a Curse and was first produced in Washington in 1953.

The original Broadway production starred Carroll Baker. The New York Times called it a "poignant and beautiful play."

== Adaptation ==
The play was adapted for TV in 1961 with Keir Dullea.
