= Acropolis (play) =

1933 play by Robert E. Sherwood

Acropolis is a 1933 play by American playwright Robert E. Sherwood.
