= Fritz Spielmann (composer) =

Austrian song composer, aka Fred Spielman (1906–1997)

Fritz Spielmann (20 November 1906 – 21 March 1997) was an Austrian composer, pianist, singer and cabaret artist. As an émigré in America from 1939 he composed under the name Fred Spielman.

== Early life ==
Born in Vienna, Spielmann began studying piano and composition the Vienna Academy of Music from 1918, where his teachers included Joseph Marx and Hans Gál. He worked as an accompanist and conductor in Berlin and Breslau, and from 1931 he was one of the founders of the literary cabaret Der Liebe Augustin with Stella Kadmon. He became well known as a cabaret pianist and entertainer, mixing jazz and Viennese song. From 1934 until 1937 he formed a song-writing team with Stephan Weiss (1899-1989). The song 'Schinkenfleckerln!', taken up by Hermann Leopoldi was one of their biggest successes.

Following the Anschluss he emigrated from Vienna to Paris in May 1938 - while most of his family fell victim to the Nazis. The following year he moved to New York and began working with fellow exiles Leopoldi and lyricist Jimmy Berg (1909-1988), changing his given name to Fred.

== America ==
Written with Kermit Goell, Spielmann's song 'Shepherd Serenade' was recorded by Bing Crosby, selling over a million copies in 1941. His songs assimilated the American tradition rather than carrying forward his Viennese heritage. Moving to Hollywood, Spielmann wrote songs for the likes of the Andrews Sisters, Hoagy Carmichael, Doris Day ('A Purple Cow'), Judy Garland, Danny Kaye, Jane Powell (in the 1948 film Luxury Liner), Elvis Presley (in the 1962 film Girls, Girls, Girls), and Frank Sinatra ('One Finger Melody').

Spielmann had great success from the 1950s into the 1970s with songs for Broadway, films (under contract with MGM) and television. With lyricist Janice Torre he composed the score for the first Dickens musical, The Stingiest Man in Town (Scrooge), broadcast by NBC in 1956, with an animation remake in 1978. Also with Torre he wrote the song 'Paper Roses', a hit for Anita Bryant in 1960 and for Marie Osmond in 1973.

Other songs known from multiple versions include: 'It Only Hurts for a Little While' (Ames Brothers 1956, Margo Smith 1978 and Anne Murray 1993); 'If Love is Good to Me' (Nat King Cole 1953, Jackie Paris 1954, Carmen McRae 1960, Dean Martin 1961, Sarah Vaughan 1961 and Nancy Wilson (1965); and 'You Won't Forget Me' (Helen Merrill 1956, Toni Fisher 1963, Shirley Horn with Miles Davis 1991, Keith Jarrett 1993 and Carly Simon (1997).

In later life Spielmann revived his interest in the classical music tradition with the cantata And the Lord Said, for soprano, choir and orchestra, written when he was 80. He died in New York at the age of 90.
