= Janice Torre =

American musical artist

- Born: Janice Renée Torre; August 17, 1914; New Orleans, Louisiana, U.S.
- Died: February 21, 1985 (aged 70); New York City, U.S.
- Education: Tulane University (BA); Yale University (MFA)
- Musical career
- Genres: popular songs, motion picture and television musicals
- Occupations: Songwriter, lyricist
- Years active: 1948–1962

Janice Renée Torre (August 17, 1914 – February 21, 1985) was a songwriter and lyricist best known for the song "Paper Roses", which she wrote with composer Fred Spielman.

== Early years ==
Janice Torre was born in New Orleans, the daughter of Peter Torre, an Italian immigrant developer in the oil industry, and Juanita Mottram. Janice graduated from Academy of the Sacred Heart (New Orleans), H. Sophie Newcomb Memorial College of Tulane University, where she was president of her Senior Class, and Yale School of Drama. At Newcomb she was a member of Alpha Omicron Pi.

== Musical career ==
Janice Torre collaborated with the composer Fred Spielman. Torre wrote song lyrics for the films All Shook Up with Elvis Presley, Tom Thumb, Luxury Liner with Lauritz Melchior, In the Good Old Summertime with Judy Garland, Big City, and Girls! Girls! Girls! (1962) with Elvis Presley. Torre and Spielman wrote the television musical adaptation of Charles Dickens's A Christmas Carol, titled The Stingiest Man in Town (1956)

== Personal and later years ==
Janice Torre was married to Gregory Manning Perky, a science teacher at the Isidore Newman School in New Orleans. She composed her last film score in 1962. She died in New York City.
