= The Alcoa Hour =

American TV dramatic anthology series (1955–1957)

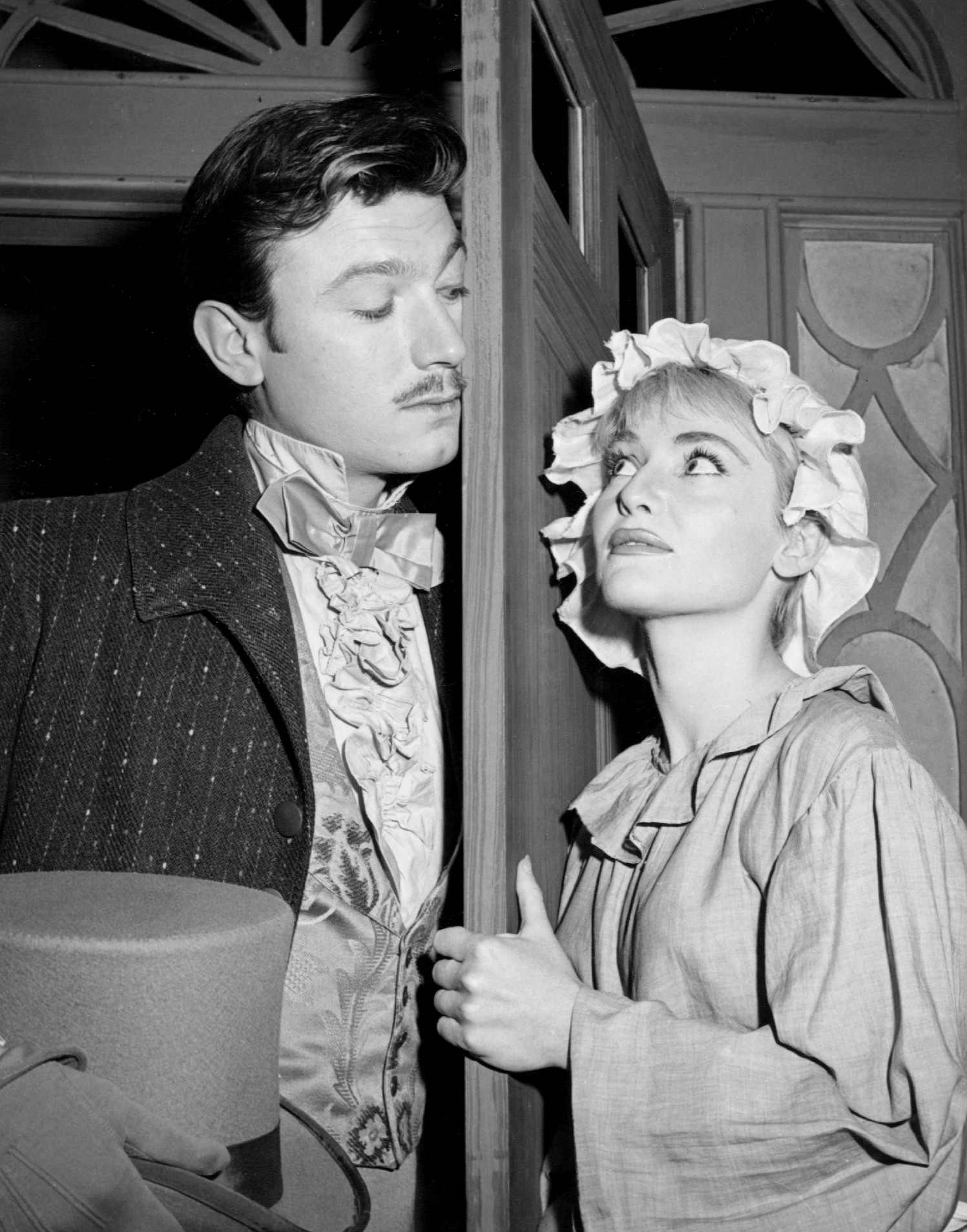
- Laurence Harvey and Diane Cilento in "The Small Servant", 1955.
- Genre: Anthology
- Directed by: Kirk Browning; Norman Felton; Herbert Hirschman; Sidney Lumet; Robert Mulligan
- Composer: Gian Carlo Menotti
- Country of origin: United States
- Original language: English
- No. of seasons: 2
- No. of episodes: 52

Production
- Producers: Herbert Brodkin; Samuel Chotzinoff; Joel Spector
- Running time: 47–50 minutes
- Production company: Showcase Productions

Original release
- Network: NBC
- Release: 16 October 1955 – 22 September 1957

Related
- Alcoa Theatre

The Alcoa Hour is an American anthology television series sponsored by the Alcoa Corporation that aired live on NBC from October 16, 1955, to September 22, 1957.

== Overview ==
The Alcoa Hour is a one-hour live anthology series that primarily presented dramas but occasionally presented a musical or a comedy.

The series alternated weeks in the same time slot with the Goodyear Television Playhouse until both series ended in 1957.

== Notable episodes ==
The series's premiere episode, The Black Wings, marked the American TV debut of Ann Todd.

The show garnered press in February 1956 for actor Lloyd Bridges's emotional performance in an episode titled "Tragedy in a Temporary Town", directed by Sidney Lumet. During the performance, Bridges inadvertently slipped in some profanity while ad-libbing. Although the slip of the lip generated hundreds of complaints, the episode won a Robert E. Sherwood Television Award, with Bridges's slip defended by many, including some members of the clergy. The episode, during which an innocent Puerto Rican man is targeted by a mob for a sexual crime, was cited by the Anti-Defamation League as "the best dramatic program of the year dealing with interethnic group relations".

One episode was the telecast of The Stingiest Man in Town, a musical adaptation of Charles Dickens's A Christmas Carol, starring Basil Rathbone, Johnny Desmond and Vic Damone. It is the only Alcoa Hour production to be granted an original cast album recording. The Stingiest Man in Town was remade in 1978 as a Rankin-Bass animated cartoon featuring the voice of Walter Matthau as Scrooge, and was also sponsored by Alcoa. Another record album, The Magic Horn (Victor LPM-1332), was "not the soundtrack, but largely a re-creation of the music that was played" on the show's episode "The Magic Horn".

== Episodes ==
=== Series overview ===
Series	Episodes	Originally released	
Series	Episodes	First released	Last released
1	26	16 October 1955	30 September 1956
2	26	14 October 1956	22 September 1957

=== Season 1 (1955-56) ===
No. overall	No. in season	Title	Guest Stars	Original release date
1	1	"The Black Wings"	Wendell Corey, Robert Flemyng, Ann Todd	16 October 1955
2	2	"The Small Servant"	Laurence Harvey, Halliwell Hobbes, Diane Cilento	30 October 1955
3	3	"A Girl Can Tell"	Diana Lynn, Natalie Trundy, Carleton Carpenter, Jack Whiting	13 November 1955
4	4	"Thunder in Washington"	Melvyn Douglas, Ed Begley	27 November 1955
5	5	"Undertow"	Robert Preston, Teresa Wright, John Kerr, Thomas Mitchell	11 December 1955
6	6	"Amahl and the Night Visitors"	Rosemary Kuhlman, David Aiken, Leon Lishner, Andrew McKinley	25 December 1955
7	7	"Man on a Tiger"	Melvyn Douglas, Tony Randall, Keenan Wynn	8 January 1956
8	8	"A Patch of Faith"	Lee J. Cobb, Robert Emhardt, Theodore Bikel, Miko Oscard, Will Kuluva, Lilia Skala, Nehemiah Persoff (as Nicholas Persoff), Henry Lascoe, George Petalis, Kenneth Sharpe, Luis van Rooten	22 January 1956
9	9	"Long After Summer"	Robert Preston, Susan Kohner	5 February 1956
10	10	"Tragedy in a Temporary Town"	Ed Binns, Lloyd Bridges, Robert Emhardt	19 February 1956
11	11	"Man on Fire"	Tom Ewell, Patricia Barry, Neva Patterson, Ed Begley	4 March 1956
12	12	"Doll Face"	Gene Lyons, Nancy Malone, Glenda Farrell	18 March 1956
13	13	"Finkle's Contest"	David Opatoshu, Hans Conried, Norman Fell	1 April 1956
14	14	"Even the Weariest River"	Lee Grant, Boris Karloff, Christopher Plummer, Jason Robards	15 April 1956
15	15	"Paris and Mrs. Perlman"	Gertrude Berg, Claude Dauphin	29 April 1956
16	16	"The President"	Claude Rains, Mildred Dunnock, Everett Sloane	13 May 1956
17	17	"The Confidence Man"	Hume Cronyn, Jessica Tandy	27 May 1956
18	18	"The Magic Horn"	Ralph Meeker, Sal Mineo	10 June 1956
19	19	"The Archangel Harrigan"	Darren McGavin, Frank Aletter, Pat Hingle, Janice Rule	24 June 1956
20	20	"The Piper of St. James"	Brenda Forbes, Barry Jones, Patrick O'Neal	8 July 1956
21	21	"Sister"	Gladys Cooper, Cathleen Nesbitt, Vincent Price	22 July 1956
22	22	"Kiss and Tell"	Robin Morgan, Warren Berlinger	5 August 1956
23	23	"The Big Vote"	Ed Begley, Walter Matthau	19 August 1956
24	24	"The Girl in Chapter One"	James Daly, Joanne Woodward	2 September 1956
25	25	"Flight into Danger"	Patricia Barry, Macdonald Carey	16 September 1956
26	26	"The Big Wave"	Hume Cronyn, Carol Lynley, Rip Torn	30 September 1956

=== Season 2 (1956-57) ===
No. overall	No. in season	Title	Guest Stars	Original release date
27	1	"Key Largo"	Anne Bancroft, Lorne Greene, Victor Jory	14 October 1956
28	2	"Morning's at Seven"	Dorothy Gish, Lillian Gish, David Wayne	4 November 1956
29	3	"Merry Christmas, Mr. Baxter"	Margaret Hamilton, Dennis King, John McGiver	2 December 1956
30	4	"Adventure in Diamonds"	Gary Merrill, Viveca Lindfors	9 December 1956
31	5	"The Stingiest Man in Town"	Basil Rathbone, Vic Damone	23 December 1956
32	6	"A Double Life"	Shelley Winters, Nina Foch, Eric Portman	6 January 1957
33	7	"Ride the Wild Mare"	Lloyd Bridges, Betty Field, Edward Andrews	20 January 1957
34	8	"No License to Kill (I)"	Hume Cronyn, Eileen Heckart, Carl Betz, Jack Klugman	3 February 1957
35	9	"The Animal Kingdom"	Robert Preston, Joanne Linville	17 February 1957
36	10	"The Last Train to Pusan"	Gary Merrill, Virginia Kaye, Philip Ahn	3 March 1957
37	11	"The Original Miss Chase"	Nanette Fabray, Darren McGavin	17 March 1957
38	12	"The Big Build-Up"	E.G. Marshall, George Peppard, Jason Robards	31 March 1957
39	13	"Nothing to Lose"	Ralph Bellamy, James Whitmore	14 April 1957
40	14	"Mechanical Manhunt"	Sallie Brophy, Richard Kiley	28 April 1957
41	15	"Protege"	Skip Homeier, Betsy Palmer, Ed Wynn	19 May 1957
42	16*	TBA	TBA	2 June 1957
43	17	"Mrs. Gilling and the Skyscraper"	Helen Hayes, Wilfrid Hyde-White, Jack Klugman	9 June 1957
44	18	"Awake With Fear"	Eddie Bracken, Henry Jones	23 June 1957
45	19	"Hostages to Fortune"	Anne Bancroft, Rip Torn	7 July 1957
46	20	"He's For Me"	Roddy McDowall, Larry Blyden, Elaine Stritch	21 July 1957
47	21	"Weekend in Vermont"	Patricia Barry, Tony Randall	4 August 1957
48	22	"The Trouble With Women"	Audrey Christie, Walter Matthau	11 August 1956
49	23	"The Littlest Little Leaguer"	Jacob Kalich, Peter Lazer, Nehemiah Persoff	25 August 1957
50	24	"No License to Kill (II)"	Eddie Albert, Maureen Stapleton	1 September 1957
51	25	"14 October 1864"	Alan Nixon, James Pritchett, Clu Gulager	15 September 1957
52	26	"Night"	E.G. Marshall, Jason Robards, Franchot Tone	22 September 1957

*No information found for this episode.

== Production ==
Herbert Brodkin was the initial producer. In May 1956 it was announced that associate producer Philip Barry Jr. would oversee the series while Brodkin took a 12-week summer vacation. However, in August it was announced that Brodkin would not be returning to the series, and in November he negotiated an exit from his contract with NBC and signed with the CBS network.

Its first color episode was broadcast on April 19, 1956, from NBC's Brooklyn studio.

The trade publication Billboard reported in September 1956 that the budget for the Alcoa-Goodyear program had been increased to an estimated $65,000 per production for the upcoming season. It had been $45,000 during the previous season. The extra funding was said to allow the shows to "go in more for established properties which have greater exploitation possibilities to awaken audience interest".

== Critical response ==
Jack Gould, writing in The New York Times, commended the presentation of "The Big Wave" as one that "added further luster to the Alcoa Hour". He commended the director's and producer's conveying the story "to the home screen with deeply understanding fidelity", and noted that the episode "was one of the most rewarding programs yet seen" for viewers who had color receivers.

In contrast, The Times called the series's final episode, "Night", "a pointless and offensive exercise in violence and inanity". The brief review ended with, "There was no excuse at all for this one."

== See also ==
- Alcoa Premiere
- Alcoa Theatre
