= Robert E. Sherwood =

American writer (1896–1955)

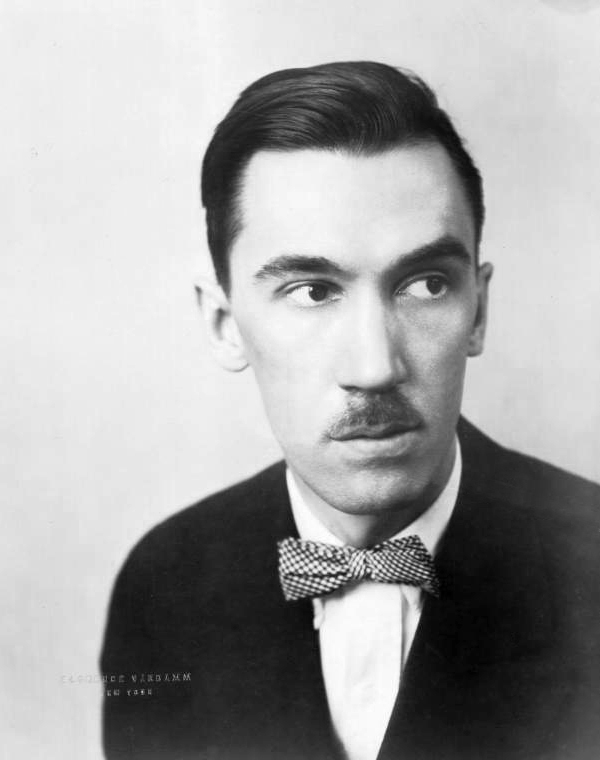
- Sherwood in 1928
- Born: Robert Emmet Sherwood; April 4, 1896; New Rochelle, New York, U.S.
- Died: November 14, 1955 (aged 59); New York City, U.S.
- Education: Harvard University (BA)
- Occupations: Author; playwright; screenwriter; historian
- Spouses: Mary Brandon (m. 1922; div. 1934); Madeline Hurlock (m. 1935)
- Writing career
- Notable works: Waterloo Bridge; Idiot's Delight; Abe Lincoln in Illinois; Rebecca; There Shall Be No Night; The Best Years of Our Lives; The Bishop's Wife
- Notable awards: Pulitzer Prize for Drama (1936, 1939, 1941); Academy Award for Best Screenplay (1947); Pulitzer Prize for Biography (1948)

Robert Emmet Sherwood (April 4, 1896 – November 14, 1955) was an American playwright and screenwriter.

He is the author of Waterloo Bridge, Idiot's Delight, Abe Lincoln in Illinois, There Shall Be No Night, and The Best Years of Our Lives. He was a screenwriter on the adapted films Rebecca and The Bishop's Wife.

He received the Pulitzer Prize for Drama (1936, 1939, 1941), an Academy Award for Best Adapted Screenplay (1947) and a Pulitzer Prize for Biography (1949).

== Early life and family ==
Born in 1896 in New Rochelle, New York, Robert was a son of Arthur Murray Sherwood, a rich stockbroker who co-founded The Harvard Lampoon while in college, and his wife, the former Rosina Emmet, a highly accomplished illustrator and portrait painter known as Rosina E. Sherwood. His paternal grandmother, Mary Elizabeth Wilson Sherwood, was an author and social leader. He was a great-great-grandson of the former New York State Attorney General Thomas Addis Emmet and a great-grandnephew of the Irish nationalist Robert Emmet, who was executed for high treason after leading the Irish rebellion of 1803, one of a series of attempts to dislodge British rule in Ireland, in 1803. His relatives also included three other notable American portrait artists: his aunts, Lydia Field Emmet and Jane Emmet de Glehn, and his first cousin, once removed, Ellen Emmet Rand.

Sherwood was educated at Fay School, Milton Academy and then Harvard University from 1914 to 1917. Sherwood left Harvard to enlist in the 42nd Battalion of the Canadian Expeditionary Force, after the United States Army rejected him as being too tall. During his World War I service in France he was gassed and wounded twice. After his return to the United States, he began working as a movie critic for magazines including Life and Vanity Fair. Sherwood's career as a critic in the 1920s is discussed in the 2009 documentary For the Love of Movies: The Story of American Film Criticism. In this film Time critic Richard Schickel discusses, among other topics, how Sherwood was the first New York critic invited to Hollywood by cross-country train to meet the stars and directors.

== Writing career ==
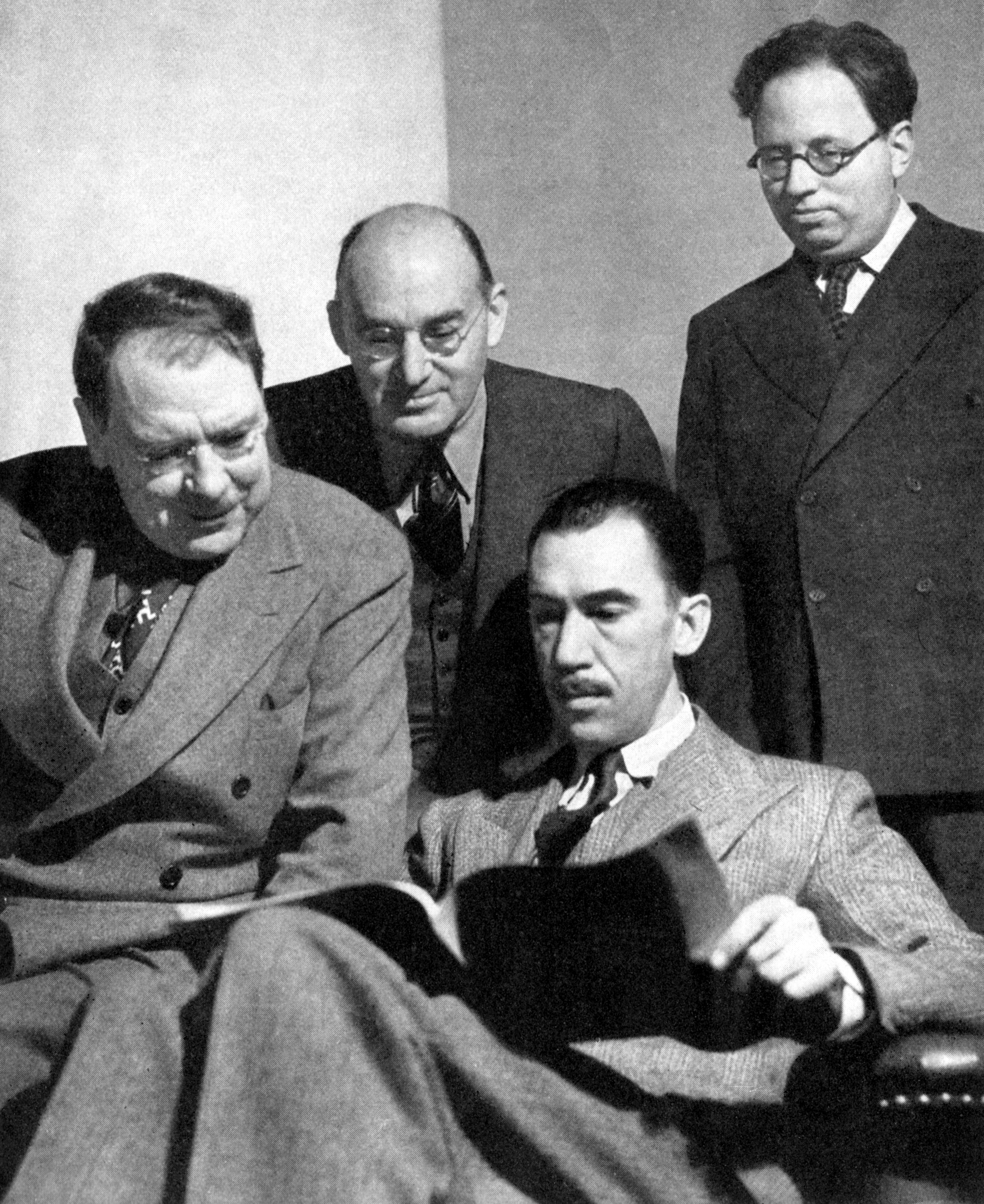
From left, Maxwell Anderson, S. N. Behrman, Sherwood and Elmer Rice, four of the five founders of the Playwrights' Company (1938)

Sherwood was one of the original members of the Algonquin Round Table. He was close friends with Dorothy Parker and Robert Benchley, who were on the staff of Vanity Fair with Sherwood when the Round Table began meeting in 1919. Author Edna Ferber was also a good friend.

In 1920, Sherwood became editor of Life.

Sherwood's first Broadway play, The Road to Rome (1927), a comedy concerning Hannibal's botched invasion of Rome, introduced one of his favorite themes: the futility of war. Many of his later dramatic works employed variations of this theme, including Idiot's Delight (1936), which won Sherwood the first of four Pulitzer Prizes. According to legend, he once admitted to the gossip columnist Lucius Beebe: “The trouble with me is that I start with a big message and end up with nothing but good entertainment.”

Sherwood was actively engaged with the advocacy for writers' rights within the theatre world. From 1937 to 1939, Sherwood served as the seventh president of the Dramatists Guild of America.

Sherwood's Broadway success soon attracted the attention of Hollywood; he began writing for movies in 1926. While some of his work went uncredited, his films included many adaptations of his plays. He also collaborated with Alfred Hitchcock and Joan Harrison in writing the screenplay for Rebecca (1940).

With Europe in the midst of World War II, Sherwood set aside his anti-war stance to support the fight against the Third Reich. There Shall Be No Night, his 1940 play about the Soviet Union's invasion of Finland, was produced by the Playwright's Company that he co-founded, and it starred Alfred Lunt, Lynn Fontanne, and Montgomery Clift. Katharine Cornell produced and starred in a 1957 TV adaptation on TV. Sherwood publicly ridiculed isolationist Charles Lindbergh as a "Nazi with a Nazi's Olympian contempt for all democratic processes".

During this period Sherwood also served as a speechwriter for President Franklin D. Roosevelt. He recounted the experience in his book Roosevelt and Hopkins: An Intimate History, which won the 1949 Pulitzer Prize for Biography or Autobiography and a 1949 Bancroft Prize. Sherwood is credited with originating the phrase that eventually evolved to "Arsenal of Democracy", a notable speech and a frequent catchphrase in FDR's wartime addresses. Sherwood was quoted on May 12, 1940, by The New York Times, "This country is already, in effect, an arsenal for the democratic Allies."

After serving as director of the Overseas Branch of the Office of War Information from 1943 until the conclusion of the war, he returned to dramatic writing with the movie The Best Years of Our Lives, directed by William Wyler. The 1946 film, which explores changes in the lives of three soldiers after they return home from war, earned Sherwood an Academy Award for Best Screenplay.

== Comments regarding Sherwood's height ==
Sherwood stood 6 feet 8 inches (2.03 m) tall. Dorothy Parker, who was 5 feet 4 inches (1.63 m), once commented that when she, Sherwood, and Robert Benchley (6 feet (1.8 m)) walked down the street together, they resembled "a walking pipe organ." When asked at a party how long he had known Sherwood, Benchley stood on a chair, raised his hand to the ceiling, and said "I knew Bob Sherwood back when he was only this tall."

In 1949, comedian Groucho Marx also commented about Sherwood's height during a filmed radio broadcast of the quiz show You Bet Your Life. Groucho, who hosted the popular series, interviewed in one episode American football player Howard Scala, a member of the NFL's Green Bay Packers. Impressed by Scala's own considerable height, Marx shared the following anecdote with the show's audience:

Reminds me of Bob Sherwood, the playwright, he's an old friend of mine; and he's six-foot-five and very thin. I said to him one day 'Bob, what do you say to people when they ask you how the weather is up there?' He said 'I spit in their eye and tell ‘em it's raining.'

== Death and legacy ==
Sherwood died of a heart attack in New York City in 1955. A production of Small War on Murray Hill, his final work, debuted on Broadway at the Ethel Barrymore Theatre on January 3, 1957.

Sherwood was portrayed by actor Nick Cassavetes in Mrs. Parker and the Vicious Circle, a 1994 movie about the Algonquin Round Table.

== Plays ==
Cover of Sherwood's play There Shall Be No Night

- The Road to Rome (1927)
- The Love Nest (1927)
- The Queen's Husband (1928), adapted into the 1931 film The Royal Bed
- Waterloo Bridge (1930), adapted into two American films and two Brazilian soap-operas
- This Is New York (1930), adapted into the 1932 film Two Kinds of Women
- Reunion in Vienna (1931), adapted into a 1933 film
- Acropolis (1933)
- The Petrified Forest (1935), adapted into a 1936 film with Leslie Howard, Bette Davis, and Humphrey Bogart
- Tovarich (1935), from a French comedy by Jacques Deval, adapted into a 1937 film and a 1963 musical with Vivien Leigh and Jean Pierre Aumont
- Idiot's Delight (1936), Pulitzer Prize for Drama, adapted into a 1939 film
- Abe Lincoln in Illinois (1938), Pulitzer Prize for Drama, adapted into a 1940 film
- There Shall Be No Night (1940), Pulitzer Prize for Drama
- The Rugged Path (1945), starring Spencer Tracy
- Miss Liberty (1949), book for Irving Berlin musical
- Small War on Murray Hill (1957), produced posthumously

== Nonfiction ==
- Sherwood, Robert E. (1948). Roosevelt and Hopkins: An Intimate History (First ed.). New York: Harper. OCLC 908375. 1949 Pulitzer Prize (Biography)
- Sherwood, Robert E. (1923). The Best Moving Pictures of 1922-1923, Also Who's Who in the Movies and the Yearbook of the American Screen (First ed.). Boston: Small, Maynard & Company.

== See also ==
- List of 20th century playwrights from the United States
