= Playwrights' Company =

Former American theatrical production company

The Playwrights Company
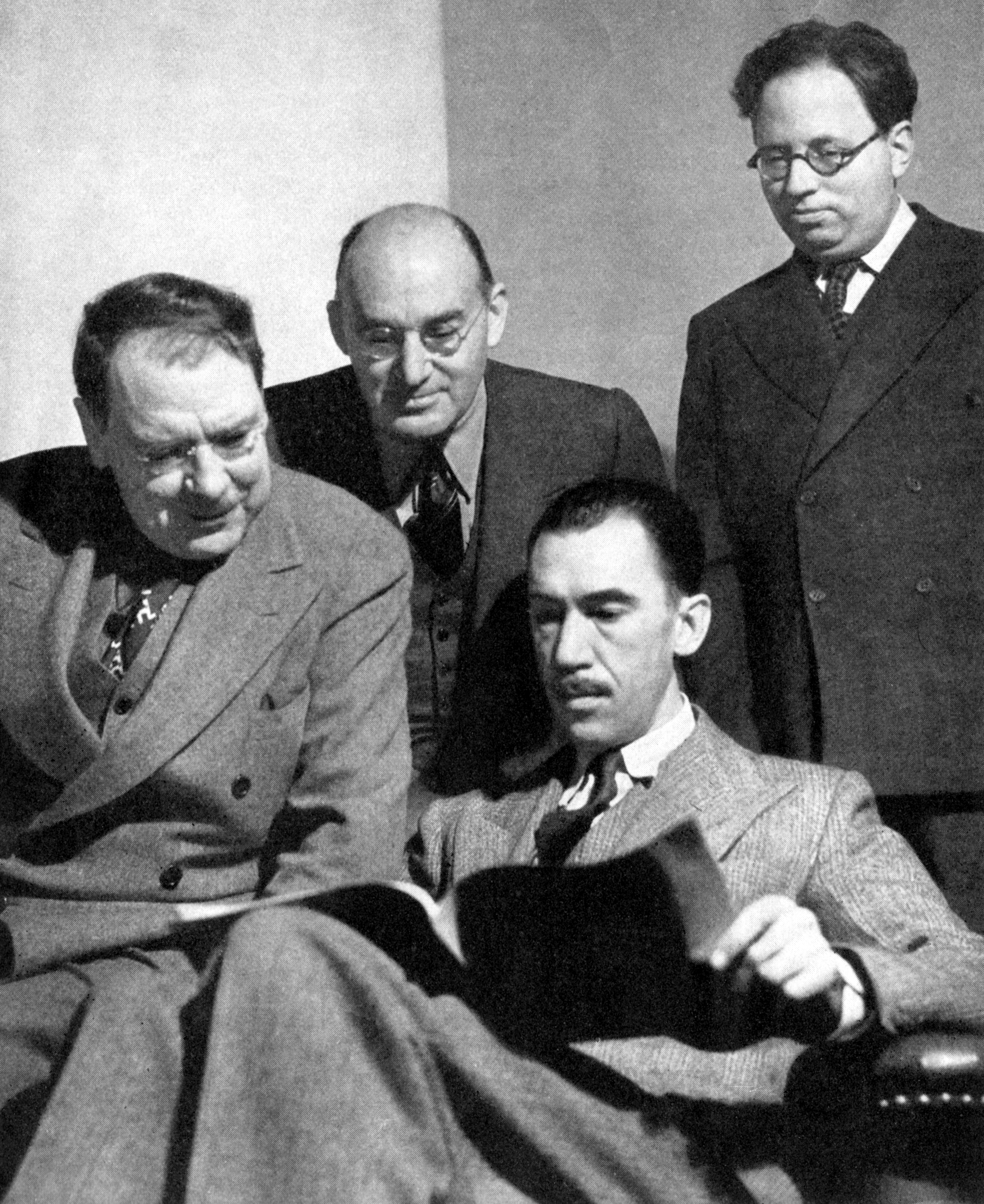
- Maxwell Anderson, S. N. Behrman, Robert E. Sherwood and Elmer Rice, four of the five founders of the Playwrights' Company (1938)
- Formation: July 1, 1938
- Founders: Maxwell Anderson, S. N. Behrman, Robert E. Sherwood, Elmer Rice, and John F. Wharton
- Dissolved: 1960
- Type: theatrical production company
- Location: New York City

The Playwrights Company (1938–1961) was an American theatrical production company.

== History ==
Maxwell Anderson, S. N. Behrman, Sidney Howard, Elmer Rice, Robert E. Sherwood and John F. Wharton established The Playwrights Company in 1938 (incorporated as The Playwrights Producing Company on July 1, 1938) to produce all works of the founding playwrights. Anderson had been frustrated with Broadway producers as well as drama critics, stating the goal of the company would be "to make a center for ourselves within the theatre and possibly rally the theatre as a whole to new levels by setting a high standard of writing and production". The founders had been unhappy with the policies of the Theatre Guild which had previously been their main producer. Initial backers included Governor Averell Harriman, publisher Dorothy Schiff, actor Raymond Massey and CBS President William Paley. Business Manager Victor Samrock, who served, in effect, as the company’s co-producer, was an initial shareholder as was their press representative William Fields. Playwright Robert Anderson (no relation to Maxwell), producer Roger L. Stevens and Kurt Weill joined later. The company was dissolved in 1960 as only two founders were still alive, Behrman (who had already left) and Rice.

The Playwrights' first effort was Sherwood’s Abe Lincoln in Illinois, about the life of the 16th President. Starring Raymond Massey, it opened on Broadway on October 15, 1938 and was an immediate success, eventually winning Sherwood his second Pulitzer Prize and confirming the promise that The Playwrights Company would become a major force in the American theatre in the coming decades.

Other early successes included Knickerbocker Holiday, a musical by Maxwell Anderson and Kurt Weill directed by Joshua Logan and starring Walter Huston, who sang the classic ballad "September Song"; Behrman’s No Time for Comedy, starring Katharine Cornell and Laurence Olivier; Anderson's drama about honor and conscience, Key Largo, starring Paul Muni and Uta Hagen; There Shall Be No Night, Sherwood's third Pulitzer-prize winner about the Russian invasion of Finland, which starred Alfred Lunt and Lynn Fontanne and a young Montgomery Clift; Anderson's The Eve of St. Mark; and The Patriots by Sidney Kingsley, the first play written by someone outside the company.

In 1945, The Playwrights' Company brought Spencer Tracy, then at the height of his movie career, to Broadway in Sherwood's The Rugged Path. Sherwood prevailed upon President Roosevelt, for whom he was serving as speechwriter and director of the United States Office of War Information, to grant a short leave to U.S. Army captain Garson Kanin so he could direct. The play suffered in out-of-town tryouts, and disappointed critics at its November opening on Broadway. Despite early success because of Tracy's name, the show closed after 81 performances.

In December 1945, Elmer Rice's comedy Dream Girl opened. It starred Rice’s wife Betty Field (later replaced by June Havoc) and became another Playwrights' success. A 1946 summer stock version with Lucille Ball, the film star and television's future Lucy, played to huge crowds.

Additional notable Playwrights' productions in the 1940s included Joan of Lorraine, which introduced Broadway audiences to Ingrid Bergman as Joan of Arc; Street Scene, a musical by Elmer Rice, Kurt Weill and poet Langston Hughes based on Rice's 1930s play about America's poor; the historical drama Anne of the Thousand Days starring Rex Harrison as Henry VIII (directed by H. C. Potter); the Rouben Mamoulian-directed Lost in the Stars; Maxwell Anderson and Kurt Weill’s adaptation of the distinguished South African novel Cry The Beloved Country and the first major musical to deal with racism; Sherwood and Irving Berlin's Miss Liberty (Moss Hart directed), which was a modest financial success, primarily because Berlin purchased the film rights himself in order to keep unblemished the record that his shows never lost money; and Maxwell Anderson's drama Truckline Cafe, co-produced with Elia Kazan and its director Harold Clurman, which was a failure except for the career-establishing, standout performance by a new young actor, Marlon Brando.

By 1950, The Playwrights Company was beginning to see the effects of company changes that had occurred throughout the 1940s. While Kurt Weill had joined as a member several years earlier, Sidney Howard had died, S. N. Behrman had resigned and Sherwood, while the ostensible leader since Howard's death, had no original play produced since 1945. Anderson and Rice would be unable to meet with any success in the early 1950s despite several attempts. In 1951, attempting to breathe new financial life into the company, The Playwrights’ accepted as a new member Roger L. Stevens, a successful real estate financier from the Midwest who was interested in the theatre. Stevens forged affiliations with Robert Whitehead, an eminent producer, and Robert Dowling, a real-estate mogul. While the new arrangements would reduce the company's expenses it would also cut into their profits; but they forged ahead with more productions of non-member dramatists.

The Fourposter, Jan de Hartog's two-character comedy about love and marriage starring Hume Cronyn and Jessica Tandy, was one such a production. With 632 performances and a subsequent 42-week national tour, it was to become a big hit after its opening on Broadway in 1951. The show perhaps "saved The Playwrights Company from extinction", wrote Sherwood in a response to a thank-you letter Hume Cronyn had sent the company after the show's first anniversary. "But what I most like about your letter", Sherwood went on, "is your recognition that the company is worth saving. The fact that Maxwell Anderson, Elmer Rice and I—and we were the three actual founders—have stuck together for 15 years is not so much a tribute to the three of us as to Victor, Bill and John Wharton". Also presented by The Playwrights' in 1951 was Darkness at Noon starring Kim Hunter and Claude Rains, which won playwright Sidney Kingsley a New York Drama Critics Circle Award.

Robert Anderson, first major play Tea and Sympathy won him membership in the company as soon as the company read it. Tea and Sympathy opened in 1953 and became The Playwrights Company's longest-running show, more than two-and-a-half years.

Other 1950s pivotal Playwrights' productions were Samuel A. Taylor's Sabrina Fair starring Joseph Cotten and Margaret Sullavan, directed by H. C. Potter; Jean Giraudoux's Ondine, starring Mel Ferrer and Audrey Hepburn directed by Alfred Lunt; Anderson's The Bad Seed, which starred Nancy Kelly and Patty McCormack; Tennessee Williams' Tony and Drama Critics Circle Award-winning Cat on a Hot Tin Roof, starring Barbara Bel Geddes, Ben Gazzara and Burl Ives, directed by Kazan; Time Remembered starring Richard Burton, Helen Hayes and Susan Strasberg; The Pleasure of His Company by Sam Taylor and Cornelia Otis Skinner, starring Cyril Ritchard, Miss Skinner and George Peppard; and Peter Shaffer's Five Finger Exercise, starring Jessica Tandy and Juliet Mills.

The Company's last play was Gore Vidal's contemporary political drama The Best Man, starring Melvyn Douglas, Lee Tracy and Frank Lovejoy, which opened in March 1960. Tracking a modern presidential election campaign not unlike the real-life one of that year, the play ran 520 performances. During its early run, candidate John F. Kennedy attended a performance and paid the cast a visit backstage.

== Award ==
After Howard's death, the four surviving members of the group created the Sidney Howard Memorial Award in his memory. The $1,500 award was created as a way to encourage new playwrights; to be eligible, one had to have at least one play produced on Broadway in a given season after having little previous success.

== Notable productions ==
- Abe Lincoln in Illinois (1938)
- Knickerbocker Holiday (1938)
- American Landscape (1938)
- No Time for Comedy (1939)
- Key Largo (1939)
- Two On An Island (1940)
- There Shall Be No Night (1940)
- Journey to Jerusalem (1940)
- Flight to the West (1940)
- The Talley Method (1941)
- Candle in the Wind (1941)
- The Eve of St. Mark (1942)
- The Pirate (1942)
- The Patriots (1943)
- A New Life (1943)
- Storm Operation (1944)
- The Rugged Path (1945)
- Dream Girl (1945)
- Truckline Cafe (1946)
- Joan of Lorraine (1946)
- Street Scene (1947)
- Anne of the Thousand Days (1948)
- The Smile of the World (1949)
- Lost in the Stars (1949)
- Darkness at Noon (1951)
- Not for Children (1951)
- The Fourposter (1951)
- Barefoot in Athens (1951)
- The Grand Tour (1951)
- Mr. Pickwick (1952)
- The Emperor's Clothes (1953)
- Tea and Sympathy (1953)
- Sabrina Fair(1953)
- In the Summer House (1953)
- The Winner (1954)
- Ondine (1954)
- All Summer Long (1954)
- The Traveling Lady (1954)
- The Bad Seed (1954)
- Cat on a Hot Tin Roof (1955)
- Once Upon A Tailor (1955)
- The Trojan War Will Not Take Place (1955)
- Tiger at the Gates (1955)
- The Ponder Heart (1956)
- The Lovers (1956)
- Small War on Murray Hill (1957)
- Time Remembered (1957)
- Nude With Violin (1957)
- The Rope Dancers (1957)
- The Country Wife (1957)
- Summer of the 17th Doll (1958)
- Present Laughter (1958)
- Howie (1958)
- Handful of Fire (1958)
- The Pleasure of His Company (1958)
- Edwin Booth (1958)
- Cue for Passion (1958)
- The Gazebo (1958)
- Look After Lulu! (1959)
- Juno (1959)
- Cherie (1959)
- Flowering Cherry (1959)
- Five Finger Exercise (1959)
- Silent Night, Lonely Night (1959)
- The Best Man (1960)
