= Eugene O'Neill Theatre =

Broadway theater in Manhattan, New York

- Forrest Theatre, Coronet Theatre
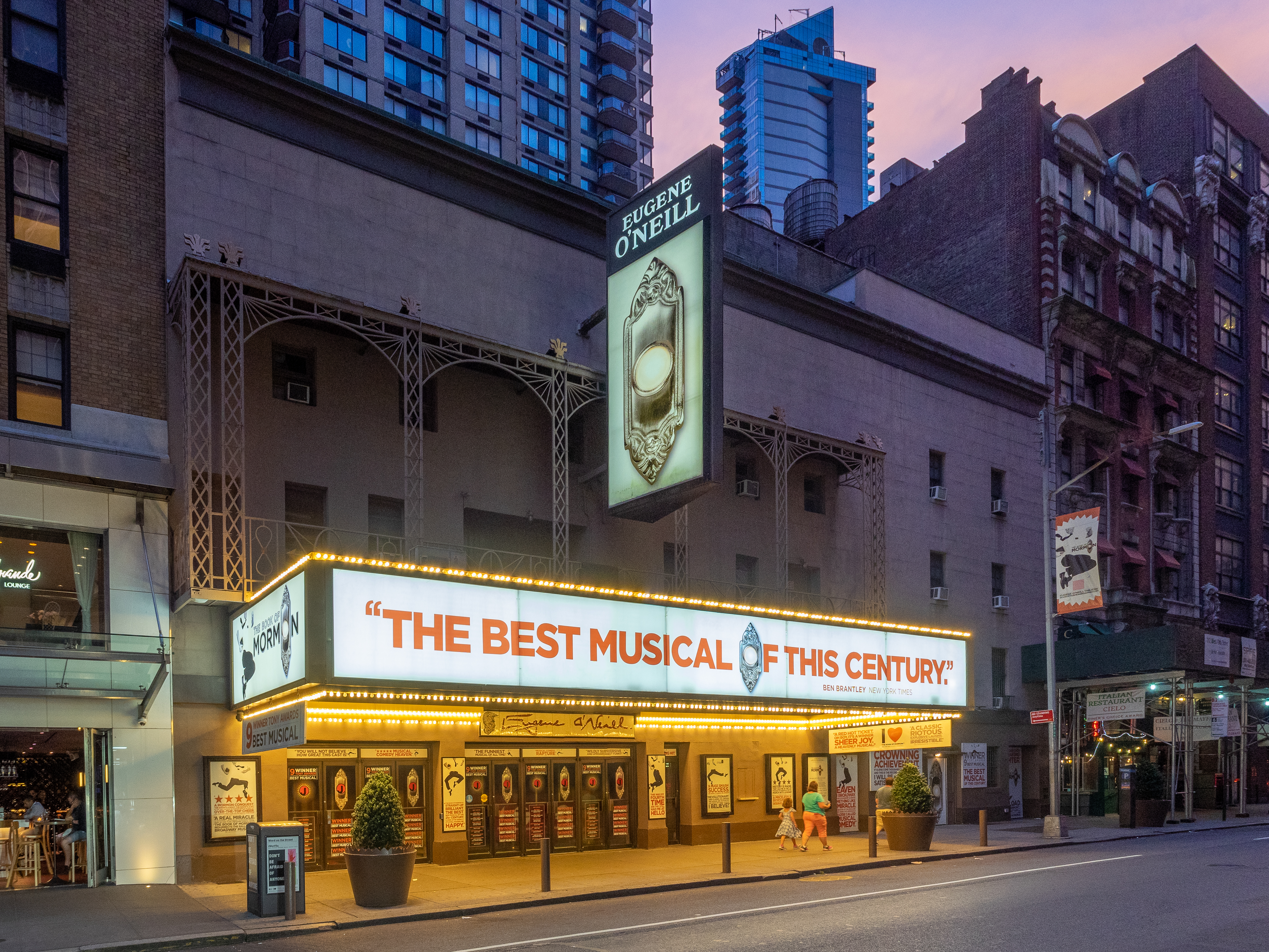
- Seen in 2019, during the run of The Book of Mormon
- Interactive map of Eugene O'Neill Theatre
- Address: 230 West 49th Street; Manhattan, New York; United States
- Coordinates: 40°45′40″N 73°59′9″W
- Owner: ATG Entertainment
- Operator: ATG Entertainment
- Capacity: 1,108
- Type: Broadway
- Production: The Book of Mormon
- Public transit: New York City Subway: 49th Street/Seventh Avenue (N, R, and W); 50th Street/Eighth Avenue (C and E); 50th Street/Broadway (1)

Construction
- Opened: November 24, 1925 (100 years ago)
- Rebuilt: 1945, 1959
- Years active: 1925–1944, 1945–present
- Architect: Herbert J. Krapp

Website
- us.atgtickets.com/venues/eugene-oneill-theatre/whats-on/

New York City Landmark
- Designated: December 8, 1987
- Reference no.: 1365
- Designated entity: Auditorium interior

The Eugene O'Neill Theatre, previously the Forrest Theatre and the Coronet Theatre, is a Broadway theater at 230 West 49th Street in the Theater District of Midtown Manhattan in New York City, New York, U.S. The theater was designed by Herbert J. Krapp and was constructed for the Shubert brothers. It opened in 1925 as part of a hotel and theater complex named after 19th-century tragedian Edwin Forrest. The modern theater, named in honor of American playwright Eugene O'Neill, has 1,108 seats across two levels and is operated by ATG Entertainment. The auditorium interior is a New York City designated landmark.

The facade was originally made of brick and terracotta to complement the neighboring hotel. The original facade was removed in a 1940s renovation and replaced with stucco; the modern theater is of painted limestone and contains a large iron balcony. The auditorium contains Adam-style detailing, a large balcony, and box seats within decorative arches. There is also a five-centered proscenium arch and a coved ceiling with medallions.

The Shuberts developed the Forrest Theatre after World War I as part of a theatrical complex around 48th and 49th Streets. When the Forrest Theatre opened on November 24, 1925, its first production was the musical Mayflowers. After a series of unsuccessful shows, the Shuberts lost the theater to foreclosure in 1934, upon which it hosted Tobacco Road, which became the longest-running production in Broadway history. Following a brief run as a broadcast studio in 1944, the theater was sold in 1945 to City Playhouse Theatres, which renovated the theater and renamed it the Coronet. The theater was sold in 1959 to Lester Osterman, who renamed it after Eugene O'Neill. The playwright Neil Simon acquired the theater in 1967, after which he staged several of his own works there. Jujamcyn Theaters took over operations in 1982 and restored it in 1994; Jujamcyn merged with ATG in 2023. The Eugene O'Neill has hosted the musical The Book of Mormon since 2011.

== Site ==
The Eugene O'Neill Theatre is on 230 West 49th Street, on the south sidewalk between Eighth Avenue and Broadway, in the Midtown Manhattan neighborhood of New York City. The rectangular land lot covers 9,547 square feet (886.9 m^{2}), with a frontage of 95 feet (29 m) on 49th Street and a depth of 100 feet (30 m). The Eugene O'Neill shares the block with the Walter Kerr Theatre to the south and Crowne Plaza Times Square Manhattan to the east. Other nearby buildings include One Worldwide Plaza and St. Malachy Roman Catholic Church to the northwest, the Ambassador Theatre and the Brill Building to the northeast, the Morgan Stanley Building to the southeast, the Longacre Theatre and Ethel Barrymore Theatre to the south, and the Samuel J. Friedman Theatre to the southwest.

== Design ==
The Eugene O'Neill Theatre (previously the Forrest Theatre and the Coronet Theatre) was designed by Herbert J. Krapp and was constructed in 1925 for the Shubert brothers. It is part of a group of six theaters planned by the Shuberts after World War I, of which four were built. The theater was originally named in honor of actor Edwin Forrest (1806–1872) (Note: The Shuberts also hired Krapp to design the Forrest Theatre in Philadelphia in 1928.) and was developed in tandem with the Forrest Hotel, also designed by Krapp. Since 1959, the theater has been named for playwright Eugene O'Neill (1888–1953). The Eugene O'Neill is operated by Jujamcyn Theaters.

=== Facade ===
The Forrest Theatre was originally designed with a facade of brick and terracotta, similar to the Forrest Hotel. At the time, including a theater and hotel in the same project was an uncommon arrangement in New York City. Krapp repeated the theater/hotel arrangement in the late 1920s when he designed the Hotel Lincoln (now Row NYC Hotel) and the Majestic, Masque (Golden), and Royale (Bernard B. Jacobs) theaters. Above the theater's entrance was a wrought-iron balcony on the second story. A three-story stage house adjoined the theater.

The facade was subsequently refaced in plain stucco, and the iron balcony outside the theater was doubled in height. The stucco facade dated to 1945, when the theater was renovated by Walker & Gillette. At the time, the facade was painted in bright colors to evoke the appearance of a closed performance venue in New Orleans. The iron balcony, as well as shutters over the windows, were designed to give this effect. The facade was renovated again in 1980, this time in beige limestone.

=== Auditorium ===
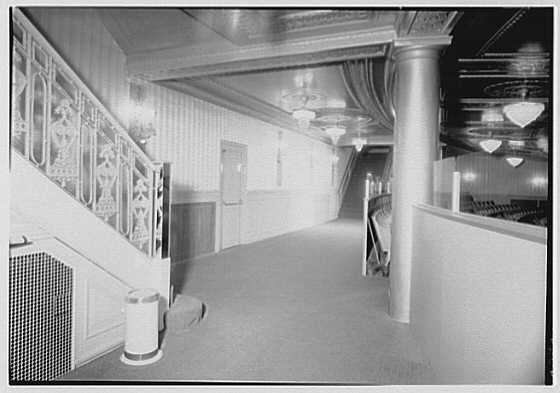
Promenade at the orchestra's rear

The auditorium has an orchestra level, one balcony, boxes, and a stage behind the proscenium arch. The auditorium is wider than its depth, and the space is designed with plaster decorations in low relief. Playbill cites the theater as having 1,047 seats and The Broadway League cites 1,066 seats. The Eugene O'Neill Theatre has been cited as having as many as 1,108 seats. As originally configured, the theater could accommodate 1,200 guests, making it suitable for musicals or plays.

The theater was constructed with a steel skeleton frame, which at the time was still mostly used for office buildings and skyscrapers. The auditorium was originally decorated in red and gold, which was changed in 1945 to blue and gray. A paint scheme of purple and gold was added in a 1994 renovation. The auditorium is approached by an entrance lobby with a terrazzo floor and marble decorations. The lobby's plaster ceiling has moldings with acanthus motifs and medallions.

==== Seating areas ====
The orchestra level is wheelchair-accessible via the main doors. The rear (east) end of the orchestra contains a shallow promenade, and the orchestra level is raked. The promenade is separated from the main orchestra seating by columns. Originally, the promenade connected directly to the bar of the adjacent Forrest Hotel (later the Time New York). The promenade's rear wall contains pilasters with fluting, between which are wainscoted wall sections. Above the promenade, the underside of the balcony is split into sections, divided by moldings with wave and guilloché motifs. The corners of the promenade have stairs that rise to the rear of the balcony. The stairs have decorated wrought iron railings. The orchestra contains plasterwork panels on the walls. Within the walls are doorways topped by friezes, as well as lighting sconces. There is an orchestra pit at the front of the stage.

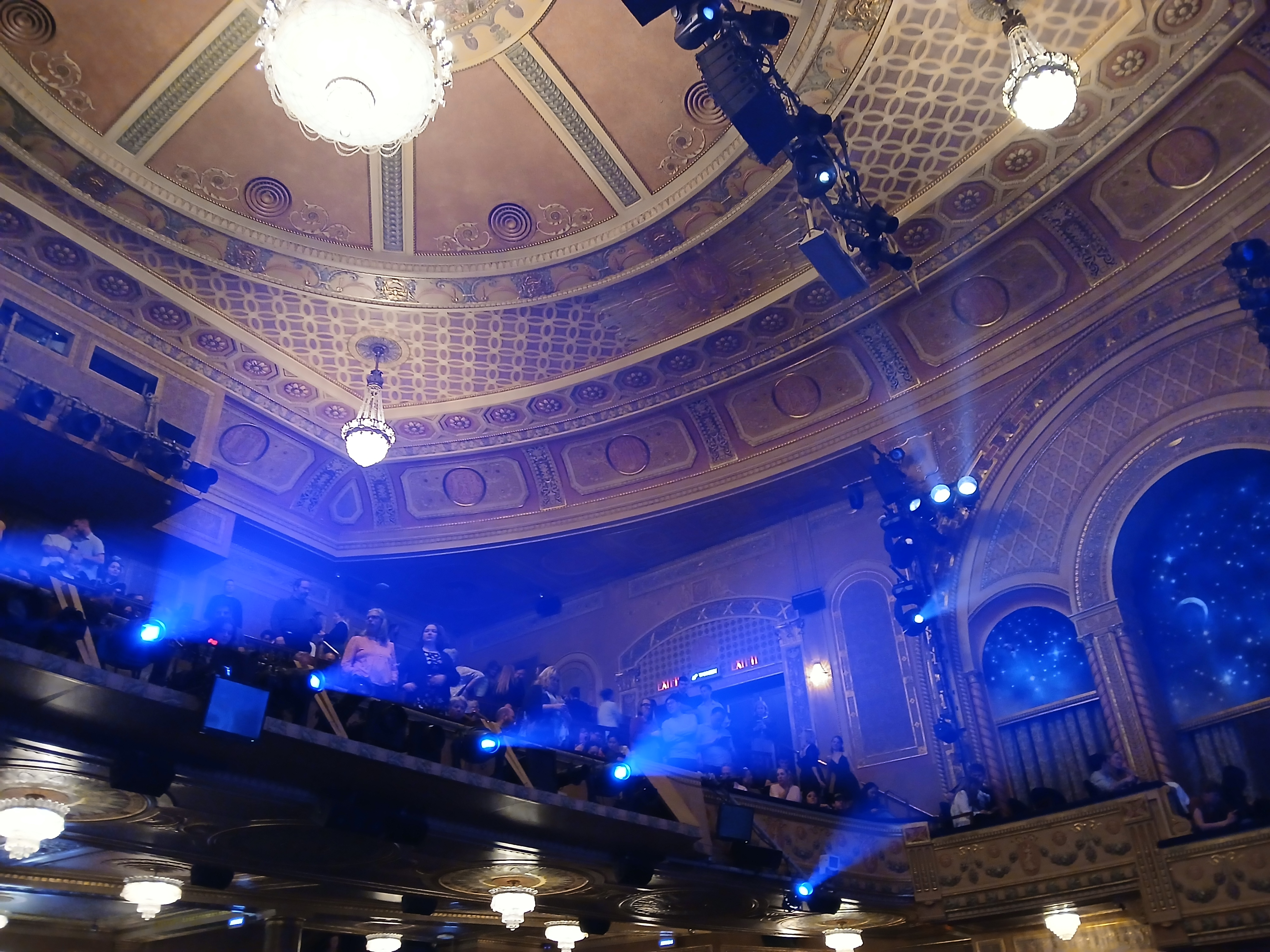
The balcony level seen from the orchestra

The balcony level can only be accessed by steps. The balcony level is raked and is divided into front and rear sections by an aisle halfway across its depth. The crossover aisles are delineated by wrought iron railings. The side walls contain exit doors flanked by Adam-style pilasters. Above the doors are Adam-style latticework containing medallions with classical figures; these are topped by segmental arches with bands of foliate decoration. There are depictions of seated women above each of the arches' keystones. The rest of the balcony's side walls contain Adam-style panels with elliptical arches. The rear wall is divided into panels and contains lighting sconces. A paneled Adam-style frieze with lamps runs near the top of the balcony wall. The balcony front curves outward and has cameo panels and swag motifs. Modern light boxes are in front of the balcony, and a technical booth is at the rear. The balcony's underside contains molded bands, which divide the surface into panels with medallions and crystal light fixtures.

On either side of the proscenium is an elliptically-arched wall section with three smaller arches. The smaller arches correspond to three boxes on the balcony level, which step down nearer to the stage. The spandrels, above the corners of the elliptical arches, contain foliate decorations around motifs of shields. The elliptical arches contain a band with foliate and fruit decorations, bordered on either side by rope moldings. Adam-style latticework fills the space between the smaller arches and the large elliptical arch. The central arch has a foliate band and is wider than the arches to either side. The central box is separated from the other boxes by pilasters with spiral moldings. The fronts of the boxes contain cameo panels and swag motifs. Similar boxes formerly existed at the orchestra level but have been removed. According to writer William Morrison, the box sections' design is reminiscent of Spanish architecture.

==== Other design features ====
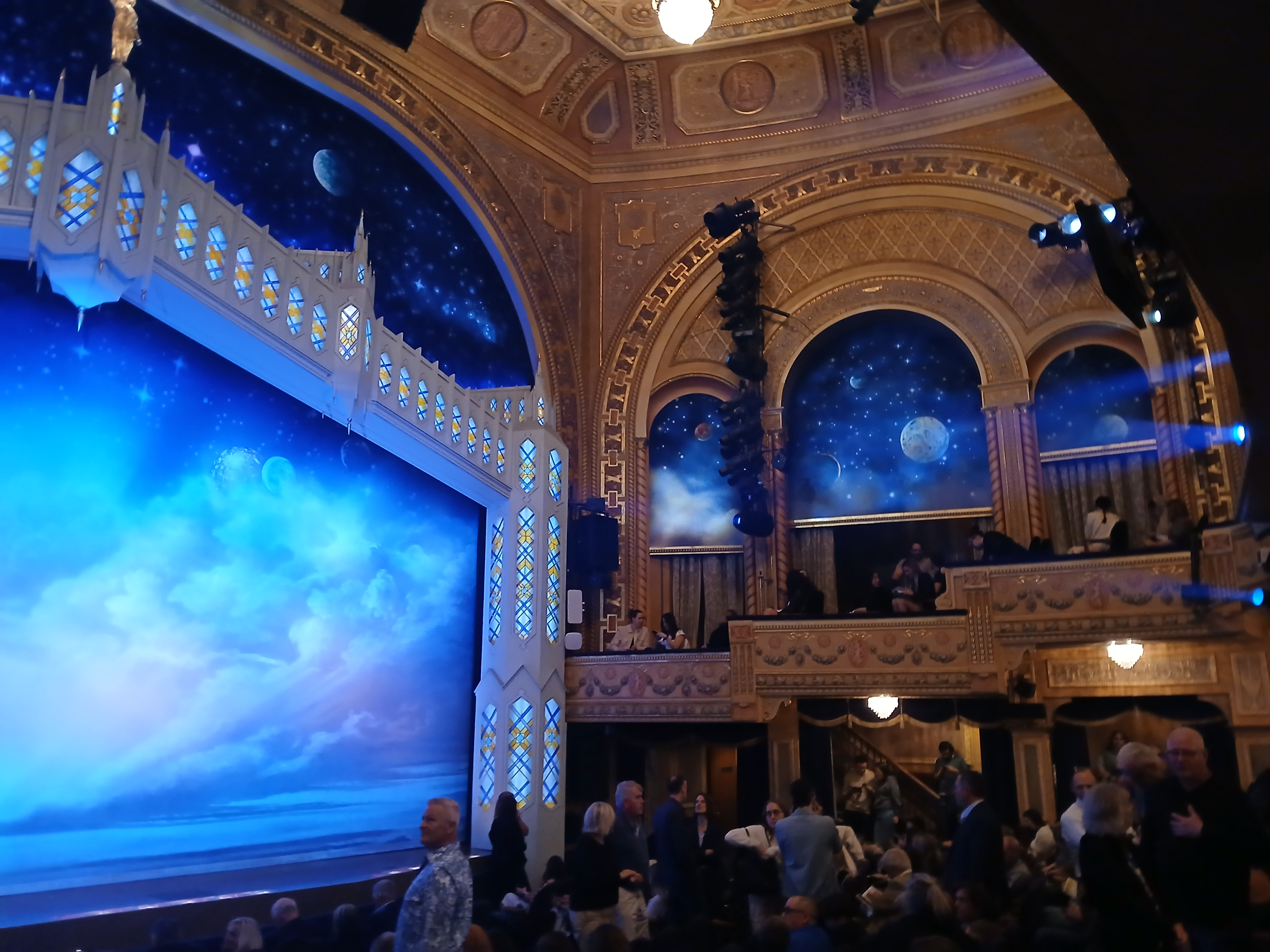
Right-hand boxes, with the proscenium arch at left

Next to the boxes is a five-centered proscenium arch. The arch contains a band with foliate and fruit decorations, bordered on either side by rope moldings. The spandrels above the proscenium arch's corners contain foliate decorations around motifs of shields. The stage originally contained a fireproof curtain, which was composed of a layer of asbestos between steel sheets. Krapp designed an electrically-powered system to move objects on the set.

On all sides of the auditorium, the wall curves onto the coved ceiling. The coved section of the ceiling contains Adam-style bands, which divide the ceiling into panels. Each of the coved panels has medallions that depict classical figures. The rest of the ceiling is surrounded by an outer band of rosettes and octagonal panels. At the center of the ceiling is a circular section, surrounded by an inner band with theatrical masks and swags. Cartouches connect the inner and outer bands of the ceiling. Five Adam-style chandeliers hang from the ceiling's corners.

== History ==
Times Square became the epicenter for large-scale theater productions between 1900 and the Great Depression. During the 1900s and 1910s, many theaters in Midtown Manhattan were developed by the Shubert brothers, one of the major theatrical syndicates of the time. The Shuberts originated from Syracuse, New York, and expanded downstate into New York City in the first decade of the 20th century. The brothers controlled a quarter of all plays and three-quarters of theatrical ticket sales in the U.S. by 1925. After World War I, the Shuberts contemplated the construction of six theaters along 48th and 49th Streets, just north of Times Square. Of these, only four were built, and only three (the Ambassador, O'Neill, and Kerr) survive. (Note: The other was the 49th Street Theatre at 235 West 49th Street, which opened in 1921 and was demolished in 1940.)

=== Development and early years ===
==== 1920s ====
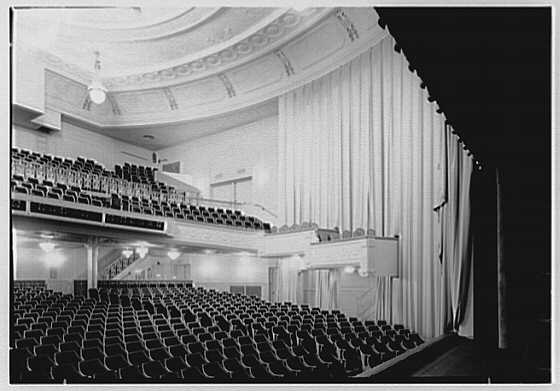
Auditorium as viewed from the stage

The Shuberts announced plans for their six new theaters in September 1920. The brothers believed that the 49th Street site could be as profitable as theaters on 42nd Street, which historically was Times Square's legitimate theatrical hub. The Shubert brothers erected the Ambassador, Ritz (now Walter Kerr), and 49th Street Theatres from 1920 to 1921, but they paused their development of theaters on 48th and 49th Street for several years afterward. In November 1924, the Shuberts sold eight row houses at 224–238 West 49th Street for $2 million to Daniel Darrow, who planned to build a theater and a 15-story hotel on the site. The Shuberts leased back the theater for 21 years. Construction on the Forrest Theatre began in May 1925. Though the Forrest was technologically advanced and had an elaborate interior design, there was relatively little media coverage about the theater. This might have been in part because of the city's plethora of theaters: just before the Forrest opened, there were 192 legitimate theaters and 548 movie houses in New York City.

The Forrest opened on November 24, 1925, with the musical Mayflowers featuring Ivy Sawyer, Joseph Santley, and Nancy Carroll. Mayflowers closed after 81 performances. The Forrest's other productions in the mid-1920s were largely unsuccessful, with a succession of flops including The Matinee Girl, Mama Loves Papa, and Rainbow Rose in 1926. The first hit at the theater was Women Go on Forever with Mary Boland, James Cagney, and Osgood Perkins, which opened in 1927 and ran for 118 performances. This was followed by what theatrical historians Louis Botto and Robert Viagas called "potboilers whose very titles denoted their doom": Bless You, Sister in 1927, as well as Mirrors, The Skull, The Common Sin, and The Squealer in 1928. In between all these flops, the husband-and-wife team of Ruth St. Denis and Ted Shawn danced at the Forrest in 1929.

==== 1930s and early 1940s ====
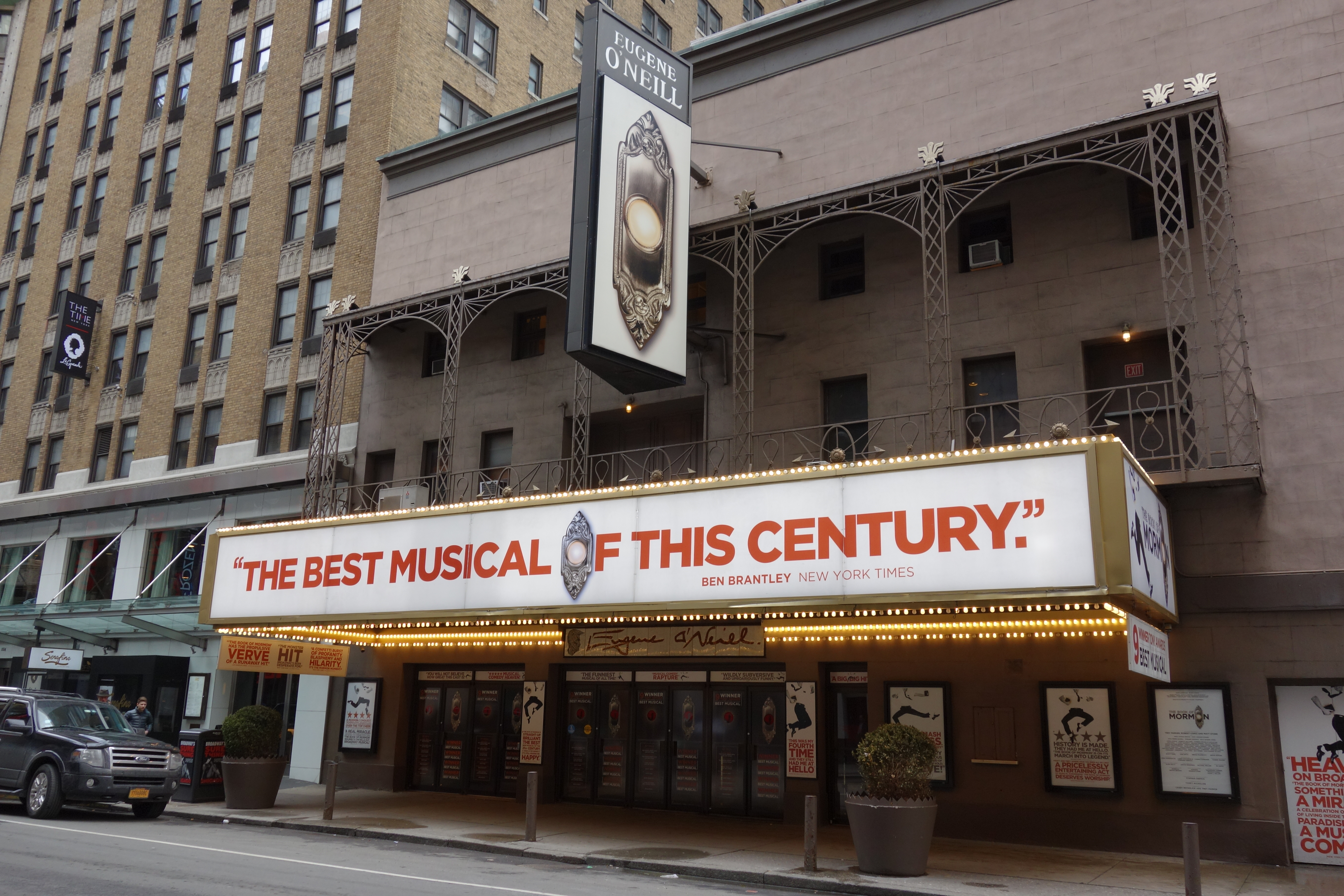
Viewed from across 49th Street, with the old Forrest Hotel to the left

The Forrest finally saw some long-running shows in 1930, when the theater hosted a transfer of John Drinkwater's comedy Bird in Hand, the mystery play The Blue Ghost, and a transfer of the burlesque-themed farce Stepping Sisters. The same year, Edgar Wallace's drama On the Spot ran at the Forrest for 167 performances, and the theater temporarily became Wallace's Forrest Theatre. By then, the Broadway theatrical industry was suffering due to the Great Depression: eighty-seven percent of productions in the 1929–1930 season had flopped. In the Best of Families, which transferred to the Forrest in March 1931, had 141 total performances. None of the seven subsequent shows at the Forrest, within a thirteen-month period starting in October 1931, had more than 36 performances. A minor hit came in November 1932 with a transfer of The Good Fairy, featuring Helen Hayes and Walter Connolly.

Despite the run of flops, the Forrest Theatre initially remained solvent because it had a doorway at the rear of its orchestra, which led to the Forrest Hotel's bar, making it the only Broadway theater with direct access to a bar. This was part of a Depression-era trend in which Broadway theatrical operators had begun offering promotions and services to attract visitors. As Variety magazine reported, the Forrest's bar gave rise to the sentiment that "the show is a flop, but the bar is a hit". However, by January 1933, the Lawyers Title and Guaranty Company moved to foreclose on a $960,000 mortgage loan on the Forrest Theatre and Hotel. The next month, As Husbands Go opened at the Forrest and ran for 144 performances. The Ballets Jooss performed a limited run at the end of 1933, and seven flops followed in the first eight months of 1934. With the mortgage loan in foreclosure, the Forrest Theatre and Hotel were sold to Lawyers Title at an auction in August 1934.

The firm of Sam Grisman and Harry H. Oshrin leased the Forrest Theatre for a year in September 1934 for their play Tobacco Road. The same month, Tobacco Road transferred to the Forrest, having opened at the Masque the previous December. Tobacco Road proved a success and, in September 1936, the producers renewed their lease of the Forrest Theatre for another five years. Tobacco Road became the longest-running Broadway production in 1939 after having performed continuously at the Forrest for five years. When it finally ended in May 1941, Tobacco Run had run for about 3,180 performances, making it Broadway's longest-running play at the time. The Shuberts then reacquired control of the Forrest but had little success for the next four years. Tobacco Road returned in 1942, but the revival closed after just 34 performances; the theater hosted Claudia and Three Men on a Horse the same year.

=== City Playhouse operation ===
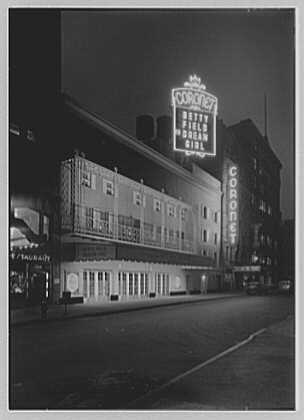
The theater as seen after it was renamed the Coronet

The empty Forrest Theatre was leased to the Mutual Broadcasting System in March 1944 for six months. Muriel White acquired the theater that July for $260,000 in cash; she was scheduled to take over once the Shuberts' lease expired in August 1945. Just as the lease was set to expire, Louis Lotito of City Playhouse Theatres bought the Forrest for $260,000. Lotito's company renovated the theater with a blue-and-gray color scheme. The dressing rooms and facade were rebuilt, and a cooling system and new seats were installed. The draperies, including the fireproof curtain, were also replaced. In addition, Lotito renamed the Forrest as the Coronet in September 1945, believing that the old name was associated with a "jinx house". Walker & Gillette oversaw the renovations.

The first production at the refurbished theater was Beggars Are Coming to Town on October 27, 1945. Though Beggars only had 25 performances, it was followed the same year by Elmer Rice's Dream Girl, which had a much longer run of 348 performances. This was followed by another hit, All My Sons by Arthur Miller, which opened in January 1947 and featured Ed Begley, Arthur Kennedy, and Karl Malden for 328 performances. The revue Angel in the Wings opened at the Coronet that December, starring Paul and Grace Hartman for 308 performances. Another revue, Burt Shevelove and Gower Champion's Small Wonder, premiered at the Coronet in 1948. Mae West's classic play Diamond Lil was revived in 1949, running for 181 performances. Less successful was a double bill of Terence Rattigan's The Browning Version and Harlequinade the same year.

The revue Tickets, Please! opened at the Coronet in early 1950 and ran for 245 performances. Samson Raphaelson's play Hilda Crane was also hosted at the Coronet later the same year. Revivals of two Lillian Hellman plays were staged next: The Autumn Garden in 1951 and The Children's Hour in 1952. A revival of the play Jane, with Edna Best, was produced in 1952 between the two Hellman plays. Liam O'Brien's play The Remarkable Mr. Pennypacker with Burgess Meredith was staged at the end of 1953, followed the next year by All Summer Long and Quadrille. In 1955, the Coronet hosted a transfer of The Bad Seed, as well as a double bill of Arthur Miller's A Memory of Two Mondays and A View from the Bridge. The Coronet's productions in 1956 included The Great Sebastians, The Sleeping Prince, and Saint Joan. This was followed in 1957 by The Waltz of the Toreadors and in 1958 by The Firstborn and The Disenchanted.

=== Osterman and O'Neill operation ===
The investor Lester Osterman signed a contract in May 1959 to buy the theater for $1.2 million, to be effective that September. Osterman planned to rename the Coronet after his favorite playwright, Eugene O'Neill, making it the first Broadway house to be renamed for a playwright. O'Neill's widow Carlotta Monterey initially opposed the move, citing concerns that O'Neill would not have wanted a commercial venue to be named for him, but Monterey ultimately relented. In preparation for the renaming, Osterman repainted the theater and commissioned an etched glass portrait of O'Neill. The Phoenix Theatre's version of O'Neill's play The Great God Brown opened in October 1959, just before the renaming. The Coronet was to have been formally renamed at a ceremony on November 27, 1959, with a preview of William Inge's play A Loss of Roses, but this was canceled when the preview was rescheduled at the last minute. The preview of Loss of Roses ultimately opened on November 30, though the production only had 25 regular performances.

The Eugene O'Neill Theatre initially hosted flops when it was renamed. The first hit at the Eugene O'Neill was the Charles Gaynor revue Show Girl with Carol Channing, which opened in 1961 and had 100 performances. This was followed by Terence Rattigan's Ross at the end of 1961 and Herb Gardner's A Thousand Clowns in 1962. Jerry Bock, Sheldon Harnick, and Joe Masteroff's musical She Loves Me was then staged at the Eugene O'Neill in 1963. Osterman sold the Eugene O'Neill Theatre to David J. Cogan, who also owned the Biltmore Theatre, in December 1964 for $1.35 million. Cogan jointly owned the Eugene O'Neill with playwright Neil Simon, who in 1967 bought Cogan's half-ownership stake, thereby acquiring full ownership. During the late 1960s, two hits transferred to the Eugene O'Neill: The Odd Couple in 1966 and Rosencrantz and Guildenstern Are Dead in 1968. This was followed by the West End musical Canterbury Tales in 1969.

Simon's wife Marsha Mason helped manage the Eugene O'Neill Theatre. Simon preserved the theater's name after acquiring full control, but he staged several of his own plays there. Among these productions were Last of the Red Hot Lovers in 1969, The Prisoner of Second Avenue in 1971, The Good Doctor in 1973, and God's Favorite in 1974, all of which were hits. This was followed by one play that Simon did not produce: Leah Napolin and Isaac Bashevis Singer's Yentl, which opened in 1975. Simon staged two more of his own hits in the late 1970s: California Suite in 1976 and a transfer of Chapter Two in 1979. His play I Ought to Be in Pictures was also a hit in 1980. Mason oversaw a restoration of the theater that year, redecorating the interior in beige and red velvet and the exterior in limestone. Conversely, Simon had two flops in the early 1980s: Fools in 1981 and Little Me in 1982. In addition, a transfer of the musical Annie was performed at the Eugene O'Neill in 1981.

=== Jujamcyn and ATG operation ===
==== 1982 to 1999 ====
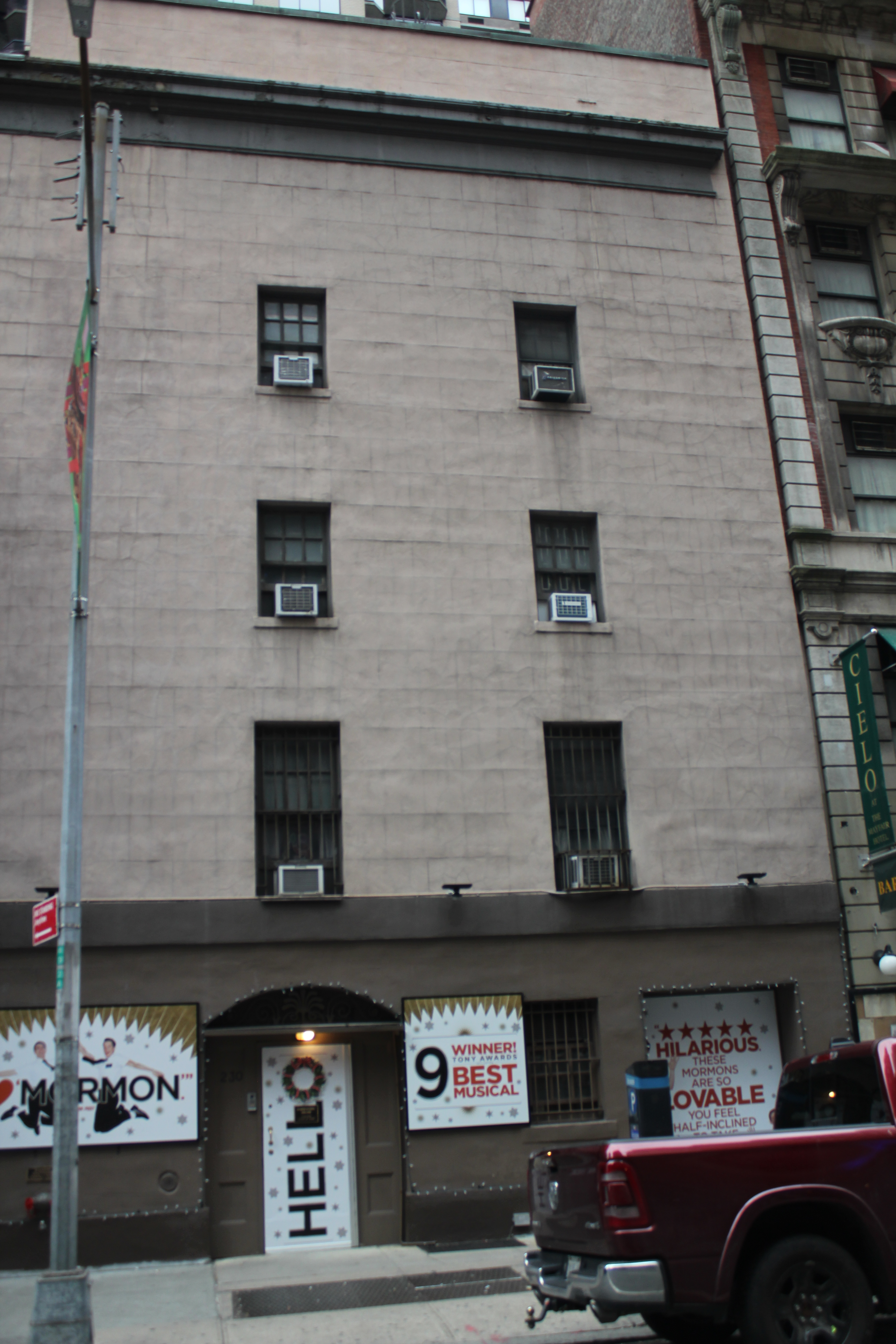
Detail of the stage house

Jujamcyn acquired the Eugene O'Neill Theatre in March 1982 from Neil Simon. The theater did not show any hits in the first year that Jujamcyn operated it. The Wake of Jamey Foster and Monday After the Miracle had short runs in 1982, but Moose Murders, which closed the day of its premiere on February 22, 1983, remained especially notorious in the decades afterward. The theater finally had a moderately successful play later in 1983, when a revival of Tennessee Williams's The Glass Menagerie opened there. This was followed by a major hit, Big River, which opened in 1985 and ran 1,005 performances over the next two years. The Eugene O'Neill's other productions of the decade included a limited concert engagement by Tom Waits in 1987, as well as David Henry Hwang's M. Butterfly in 1988.

The New York City Landmarks Preservation Commission (LPC) had started to consider protecting the Eugene O'Neill as a landmark in 1982, with discussions continuing over the next several years. The LPC designated the Eugene O'Neill's interior as a landmark on December 8, 1987, though the commission declined to give landmark status to the exterior. This was part of the commission's wide-ranging effort in 1987 to grant landmark status to Broadway theaters. The New York City Board of Estimate ratified the designations in March 1988. Jujamcyn, the Nederlanders, and the Shuberts collectively sued the LPC in June 1988 to overturn the landmark designations of 22 theaters, including the Eugene O'Neill, on the merit that the designations severely limited the extent to which the theaters could be modified. The lawsuit was escalated to the New York Supreme Court and the Supreme Court of the United States, but these designations were ultimately upheld in 1992.

The first hit to open at the Eugene O'Neill in the 1990s was a revival of Tennessee Williams's Cat on a Hot Tin Roof. This was followed in 1991 by the short-lived play La Bête and a magic show by Penn & Teller. The next production, Five Guys Named Moe, opened in 1992 and stayed at the Eugene O'Neill for a year. The play Grease! opened in 1994 and ran for 1,503 performances. During this time, Jujamcyn hired Campagna & Russo Architects to design a $1 million renovation of the theater's interior. Restoration architect Francesca Russo used historical photos to design plasterwork and decorations that approximated the theater's original appearance. The LPC granted an award for the theater's restoration in 1994. After Grease! closed, the Eugene O'Neill saw two flops in 1998: Peter Whelan's 13-performance run of The Herbal Bed and Rob Bartlett's four-performance run of More to Love. The theater's last production of the 1990s was Death of a Salesman, which opened in 1999.

==== 2000s to present ====
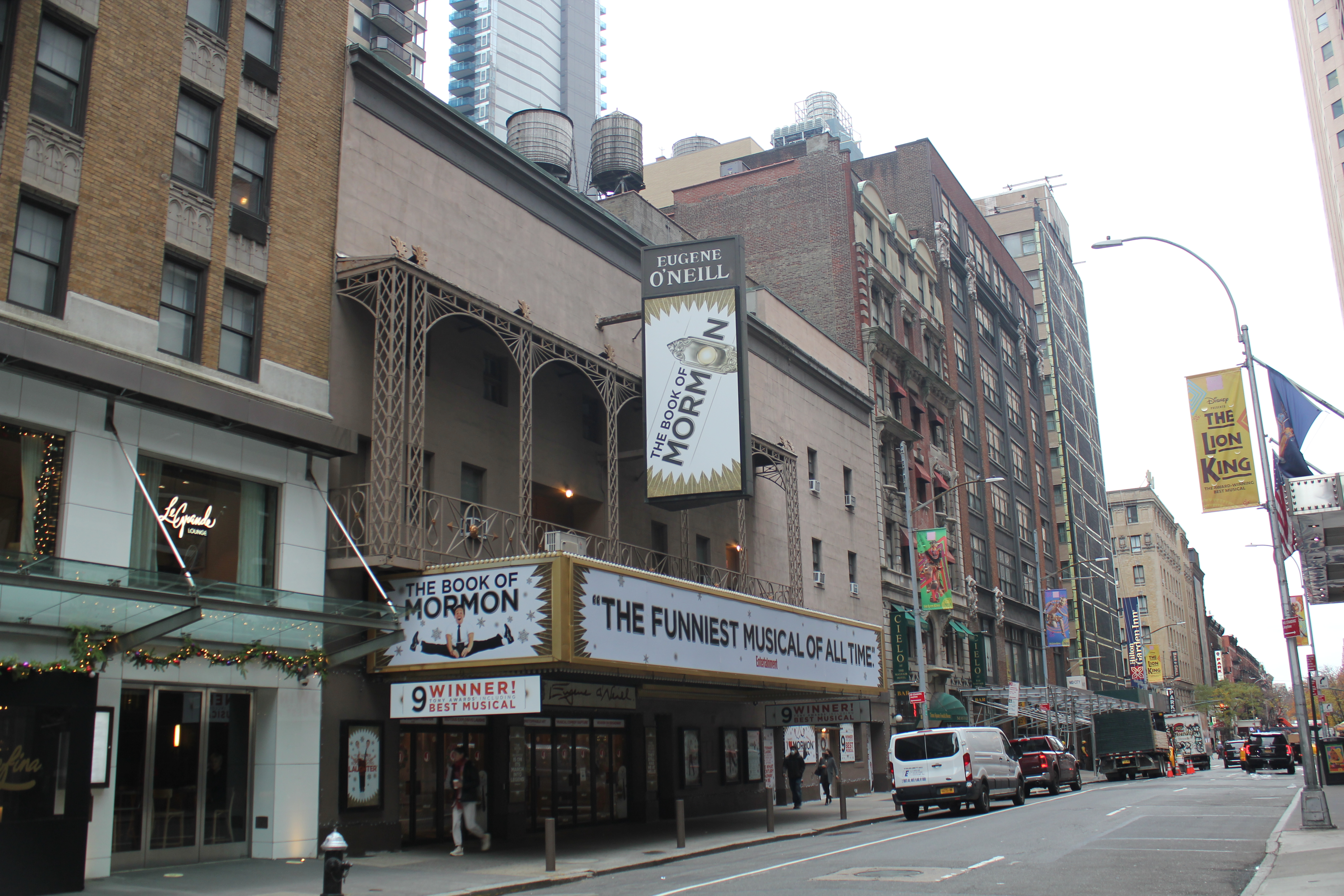
The theater's exterior as seen from the east

The play Waiting in the Wings transferred to the Eugene O'Neill in early 2000; it was followed later that year by The Full Monty, which ran for over two years. A revival of the musical Nine was then performed at the theater in 2003. The off-Broadway play Caroline, or Change relocated to the Eugene O'Neill in February 2004, but it closed that August due to poor ticket sales. The Eugene O'Neill hosted two productions in 2005: Good Vibrations and Sweeney Todd. Rocco Landesman bought the Eugene O'Neill and Jujamcyn's four other theaters in 2005, along with the air rights above them. Jordan Roth joined Jujamcyn as a resident producer the same year. The Eugene O'Neill then hosted Spring Awakening, which opened in 2006 and ran for two years.

In 2009, Roth acquired a 50 percent stake in Jujamcyn and assumed full operation of the firm when Landesman joined the National Endowments of the Arts. The same year, the Eugene O'Neill hosted 33 Variations and Fela!. The musical The Book of Mormon then opened at the Eugene O'Neill in March 2011. During the run of The Book of Mormon, the Eugene O'Neill held a one-night reading of Dustin Lance Black's play 8 on September 17, 2011. The Book of Mormon was particularly successful compared to other original productions that premiered during the 2010–2011 season, and it recouped its production costs within nine months of opening. The theater closed on March 12, 2020, due to the COVID-19 pandemic. It reopened on November 5, 2021, with performances of The Book of Mormon. As part of a settlement with the United States Department of Justice in 2021, Jujamcyn agreed to improve disabled access at its five Broadway theaters, including the Eugene O'Neill. Jujamcyn and Ambassador Theatre Group (ATG) agreed to merge in early 2023; the combined company would operate seven Broadway theaters, including the Eugene O'Neill. In July 2023, Jordan Roth sold a 93 percent stake in Jujamcyn's five theaters, including the Eugene O'Neill Theatre, to ATG and Providence Equity.

Backstage areas on the upper floors caught fire in 2026, severely damaging the electrical room, though the theater was not open to the public at the time. A number of scheduled performances during the month were canceled; Book of Mormon resumed performances after three weeks.

== Notable productions ==
Productions are listed by the year of their first performance.

=== Forrest Theatre ===
Notable productions at the theater
Opening year	Name	Refs.
1926	The Woman Disputed	
1927	Women Go on Forever	
1929	Abraham Lincoln	
1930	On the Spot	
1931	Lean Harvest	
1932	The Good Fairy	
1933	As Husbands Go	
1934	Tobacco Road (Note: Tobacco Road first ran from 1934 to 1941 and was revived in 1942.)	
1942	Tobacco Road	
1942	Three Men on a Horse	
1942	Claudia	
1943	King Richard III	
1943	Bright Lights of 1944	
1944	The Man Who Had All the Luck	

=== Coronet Theatre ===
Notable productions at the theater
Opening year	Name	Refs.
1945	Dream Girl	
1947	All My Sons	
1947	Angel in the Wings	
1949	Diamond Lil	
1949	The Browning Version/Harlequinade (Note: The Browning Version and Harlequinade played at the Coronet Theatre in repertory.)	
1950	Tickets, Please!	
1950	Hilda Crane	
1951	Not for Children	
1951	The Autumn Garden	
1952	Jane	
1952	The Children's Hour	
1953	The Little Hut	
1953	The Remarkable Mr. Pennypacker	
1954	All Summer Long	
1954	Quadrille	
1955	The Bad Seed	
1955	A Memory of Two Mondays/A View from the Bridge (Note: A Memory of Two Mondays and A View from the Bridge played at the Coronet Theatre in repertory.)	
1956	The Sleeping Prince	
1956	Saint Joan	
1957	The Waltz of the Toreadors	
1958	Summer of the Seventeenth Doll	
1958	The Disenchanted	
1959	The Great God Brown	

=== Eugene O'Neill Theatre ===
Notable productions at the theater
Opening year	Name	Refs.
1960	The Hostage	
1961	Let It Ride	
1961	Ross	
1962	A Thousand Clowns	
1963	She Loves Me	
1964	Something More!	
1966	The Odd Couple	
1967	The Freaking Out of Stephanie Blake (Note: The Freaking Out of Stephanie Blake never officially opened at the O'Neill Theatre; it only played previews.)	
1968	Rosencrantz and Guildenstern Are Dead	
1969	Canterbury Tales	
1969	Last of the Red Hot Lovers	
1971	The Prisoner of Second Avenue	
1973	The Good Doctor	
1974	God's Favorite	
1975	Yentl	
1976	California Suite	
1977	Your Arms Too Short to Box with God	
1979	Chapter Two	
1980	I Ought to Be in Pictures	
1981	Fools	
1981	Annie	
1982	Little Me	
1982	The Best Little Whorehouse in Texas	
1983	Moose Murders	
1983	The Glass Menagerie	
1985	Big River	
1987	Tom Waits in Concert on Broadway	
1988	M. Butterfly	
1990	Cat on a Hot Tin Roof	
1991	La Bête	
1991	Penn & Teller: The Refrigerator Tour	
1991	A Christmas Carol	
1992	Five Guys Named Moe	
1994	Grease	
1998	The Herbal Bed	
1999	Death of a Salesman	
2000	Waiting in the Wings	
2000	The Full Monty	
2003	Nine	
2004	Caroline, or Change	
2005	Good Vibrations	
2005	Sweeney Todd	
2006	Spring Awakening	
2009	33 Variations	
2009	Fela!	
2011	8	
2011	The Book of Mormon	

== Box office record ==
The Book of Mormon achieved the box office record for the Eugene O'Neill Theatre. The production grossed $2,224,280 over nine performances for the week ending January 4, 2015.

== See also ==
- List of Broadway theatres
- List of New York City Designated Landmarks in Manhattan from 14th to 59th Streets
