= Dream Girl (play) =

1945 play by Elmer Rice

- Original language: English
- Written by: Elmer Rice
- Subject: Bookstore manager daydreams thru life
- Genre: Comedy
- Setting: One day in Spring

Premiere
- Date: December 14, 1945
- Place: Coronet Theatre
- Directed by: Elmer Rice

Dream Girl is a 1945 two-act comedy by Elmer Rice, with a large cast, multiple sets, and quick pacing. It depicts a day in the life of a daydreaming bookstore manager, whose vivid fantasies form much of the play's action. The work makes great demands on the actress playing this part, as she is on stage constantly, must make costume and mood changes while jumping between sets, and delivers long soliloquies and a Shakespearean speech. According to some reviewers, her spoken lines were the longest female part known up to that time, nearly as long as Hamlet. The dream fantasies prompted comparison to the short story "The Secret Life of Walter Mitty", (Note: The film of that name was not released until two years after this play debuted.) but critics at the time more often suggested the play Lady in the Dark as an influence.

Dream Girl was first produced by the Playwrights' Company, of which Rice was a member, with the author directing his then wife Betty Field in the starring role. The complex scenic and lighting designs were devised by Jo Mielziner, and the ladies' gowns by Mainbocher. The play predated the Tony Awards, but Betty Field won the New York Drama Critics Award for Best Performance by an Actress. The original Broadway run lasted for one year, though the production was on hiatus during the summer months. It was a critical and popular success, was nominated for the New York Drama Critics Circle Award for Best Play of 1946, (Note: There were six nominees but after several rounds of voting it was decided to go with "No Award", an option on the ballots. See The New York Times article "Play Critics Vote No Award For Year" dated April 3, 1946, page 38 for a detailed explanation of the voting.) and within a few months of opening had made back its original investment.

The original production spun off separate companies in London and Chicago during 1946, and a national tour. It had a brief Broadway revival in 1951, and has been since adapted for film and television.

== Characters ==
For clarity, only principal "real" characters are listed; featured and dream scene characters are omitted.

Lead

- Georgina Allerton called "Georgie", age 23, runs the Mermaid Bookshop and daydreams constantly.

Supporting

- Lucy Allerton is the stoutish and sneezy mother to Georgie and Miriam, and wife to William.
- William Allerton is an attorney who specializes in pro bono cases; husband to Lucy.
- Miriam Allerton Lucas is Georgie's married and pregnant sister, disenchanted wife to Jim.
- Jim Lucas is a feckless publisher's reader, husband to Miriam and target of Georgie's dreams.
- Claire Blakely is Georgie's colleague at the Mermaid Bookshop, also 23 but more practical.
- Clark Redfield age 28, is a brash newspaper book reviewer who yearns to be a sports reporter.
- George Hand is an older married book jobber, who keeps asking Georgie to go out with him.

== Synopsis ==
Georgie Allerton wakes one morning to hear on her bedside radio a promotion for a personal advice program. Ignoring her mother's calls to get moving, Georgie imagines herself on the radio program, clutching her bedside lamp like a microphone while she reveals her love for her brother-in-law to millions. Her fantasy punctured by her mother's intervention, Georgie joins her parents at the breakfast table. There she reveals that the Mermaid Bookshop has lost less money this month than ever before. Her father William announces he's going to Washington D.C. to plead before the Supreme Court for another impecunious client. Lucy, sneezing from a cold, despairs about both their businesses and that of her hapless son-in-law Jim, who reads manuscripts for thirty dollars a week. Jim had rejected a manuscript called Always Opal that later became a runaway hit. (Note: A topical allusion to Forever Amber then a best seller) Georgie jumps to Jim's defense, since he has recommended her own manuscript to his publisher. Her sister Miriam comes in the kitchen and reveals she is pregnant and fed up with her husband. Georgie goes into another fantasy where she lies in a hospital delivery room with twin newborns, while the doctor and nurse (looking a lot like her parents) and Jim Lucas praise her courage.

Later at the bookstore, her colleague Claire Blakely agrees that without any copies of Always Opal the store will never prosper. The store's location is poor, and a better one will cost them $10,000, money they don't have. Georgie reverts to daydreaming her way out of this dilemma. Her reverie of financial success is interrupted by a stranger named Clark Redfield, who sells her some review copies of books. He doesn't need them since he never reads the books he reviews for his newspaper. (Note: The author Elmer Rice had a famously tempestuous relationship with reviewers and critics.) Clark angers Georgie by telling her to stop dreaming and live life. Jim Lucas then pops into the shop to let her know that Miriam and he are divorcing. Georgie next has a lunch date with George Hand at the Canard Rouge. He wants her to go to Mexico with him. She launches into another fantasy where she gives in to him, then is abandoned in Mexico to become a streetwalker in which Clark figures as a villain. As the afternoon goes by, Clark's presence in her daydreams changes from bad guy to good, while Jim Lucas gradually disappears.

Clark returns to the bookstore to take Georgie to dinner at Emilio's, a modest "spaghetti and red ink joint", where he has to snap her back to reality from another daydream. They go to see The Merchant of Venice; an usher seats George Hand and an expensively-gowned young lady next to them. As the play proceeds, Georgie imagines herself volunteering to take over the role of Portia when the star falters. She delivers the quality of mercy speech but the dream breaks when she sees Clark grinning at her from the audience. She and Clark wake up a Justice of the Peace at 2 am for a quick marriage ceremony, with a mutual promise that she can keep dreaming but will try to do so less often.

== Original production ==
=== Background ===
The first public notice of Dream Girl came in early July 1945 when it appeared on the Playwrights' Company schedule for the coming season. By late August columnist Sam Zolotow was able to get the details for the Playwrights' Company deal with Paramount Pictures. Paramount would contribute $50,000 towards the play's production costs, and make a $100,000 down payment to the Playwrights for the film rights with the total cost not to exceed $300,000. Zolotow also revealed that Betty Field would play the starring role when the play opened in December.

=== Scenic and lighting design ===
The production had a unique set design by Jo Mielziner, which consisted of three tracked platforms, each about 10 square feet. There was one stationed on each wing of the stage that slid into the center, and one more in the center background that slid forward. Each mobile platform was concealed by masking curtains or props when in the withdrawn position, but were visible to the audience when slid onto the main stage, though a neutral gray background screen hid the stagehands who propelled them. The platforms contained a minimum of props. The sets were lit in amber for "reality" and in a blue lighting scheme to signal a dream sequence. One scene involving a hospital delivery room was expedited by use of a "breakaway bed", which allowed the lead actress to stand behind it and in front of a fake headboard so she appeared to be sitting up in the bed.

=== Cast ===
Principal cast for the tryouts in New Haven and Boston and during the original Broadway run. The show was on hiatus from July 7 through September 1, 1946.
Role	Actor	Dates	Notes and sources
Georgina Allerton	Betty Field	Nov 22, 1945 - Apr 27, 1946	Field took an extended vacation for her health, planning to return after the summer.
Georgina Allerton	Haila Stoddard	Apr 29, 1946 - Jul 06, 1946	Stoddard, hired during winter 1946 as a full-time understudy, had already subbed for Field.
Georgina Allerton	Betty Field	Sep 02, 1946 - Sep 21, 1946	Field was taken ill and no understudy was available, so the play shut down for a week.
Georgina Allerton	June Havoc	Sep 28, 1946 - Dec 14, 1946	Havoc took over the lead role from the ailing Field one week ahead of schedule.
Lucy Allerton	Evelyn Varden	Nov 22, 1945 - Jul 06, 1946	Varden's departure was announced midway thru the summer hiatus.
Lucy Allerton	Edith King	Sep 02, 1946 - Dec 14, 1946	
William Allerton	William A. Lee	Nov 22, 1945 - Dec 14, 1946	Lee played six dream scene roles as his real character leaves for Washington D.C. early in Act I.
Miriam Allerton Lucas	Sonya Stokowski	Dec 14, 1945 - May 11, 1946	Stokowski left the play and her short theatrical career to get married. (Note: She was the daughter of Leopold Stokowski and Olga Samaroff.)
Miriam Allerton Lucas	Gaynelle Nixon	May 13, 1946 - Dec 14, 1946	Nixon was promoted from a feature role when Stokowski left.
Jim Lucas	Kevin O'Shea	Nov 22, 1945 - Dec 14, 1946	
Claire Blakely	Helen Marcy	Nov 22, 1945 - Dec 14, 1946	Marcy played the lead role of Georgie for a week when Betty Field went out sick.
Clark Redfield	Wendell Corey	Nov 22, 1945 - Jul 06, 1946	Corey left during the summer hiatus for work in Hollywood.
Clark Redfield	Richard Midgley	Sep 02, 1946 - Dec 14, 1946	
George Hand	Edmon Ryan	Nov 22, 1945 - Dec 14, 1946	

=== Tryouts ===
The first tryout was held at the Shubert Theatre in New Haven, Connecticut on November 22, 1945. The local reviewer was enthusiastic about the play, particularly the staging, set and lighting design, and Betty Field's performance. They expressed relief that the author eschewed the ideology of his recent plays in favor of "brilliant lines, high comedy, and delicious burlesque", and reported the "satire is delightful, and never malicious".

After four performances, the production went to the Plymouth Theatre in Boston, opening there on November 26, 1945. Local critic Cyrus Durgin was impressed: "The whole production is distinguished by skill, imagination, good casting, and excellent taste. Dream Girl is urbane as well as amusing." He had only one caveat, that "the script is a bit overpowered by stage mechanics", referring to the mobile platforms.

=== Premiere and reception ===
The play had its Broadway premiere on December 14, 1945, at the Coronet Theatre. Betty Field had top billing; no other performers were listed in the initial advertising. Critical appraisal was positive. John Chapman of the Daily News called it "a captivating comedy" and aptly labelled his review a "love letter to the Playwrights' Company... and to Mr. and Mrs. Rice". Syndicated columnist Jack Garver said "Miss Field, who wasn't off the stage five minutes the whole evening, carried off a rather trying role superbly" and complimented the set design: "The many scenes were presented with the precision and quickness of watch ticks through the use of tracked platforms". Edgar Price in the Brooklyn Citizen declared Dream Girl to be "one of the most delightful comedies of this or any other season".

Two reviewers displayed a more nuanced appreciation, while still rating the work as worth seeing. Arthur Pollock of the Brooklyn Daily Eagle said "It is all rather elaborately and expensively childish, giving Betty Field, the star, a variety of things to do, but otherwise having little to bring it importance of any sort". Lewis Nichols of The New York Times was more specific, suggesting the first act was too "talky" and should be cut.

The play's demanding toll on its lead actress became apparent after the third night's performance; Betty Field succumbed to "the grippe" and was out for a week. Newspapers had previously reported that Sonya Stokowski was the understudy for the role of Georgie, but the producers evidently had second thoughts. Helen Marcy memorized the part overnight and performed it the next day. When Marcy completed Portia's "The quality of mercy" speech late in the second act the audience gave her "resounding applause". Thereafter, a permanent understudy, Haila Stoddard, was hired; she subbed for a week when Betty Field was again ill during March 1946, then took over the role in late April.

=== Closing ===
Dream Girl closed on Broadway exactly one year after its premiere, following a run of 348 performances. The Chicago company, which had starred Judy Parrish and Richard Widmark, had already closed November 30, 1946. Members of both casts were combined for a national tour to begin in Philadelphia.

=== National tour ===
The national tour opened at Philadelphia's Walnut Theater on December 23, 1946. It was headed initially by June Havoc from Broadway and Richard Widmark from the Chicago company. Also in the cast were William A. Lee, Gaynelle Nixon, and Kevin O'Shea from Broadway, with Ann Andrews and Hayden Rorke from Chicago. Later on in 1947, Lucille Ball headlined the production.

== Revival ==
During May 1951 Dream Girl had a revival on Broadway, a limited engagement of two weeks at the City Center. It starred Judy Holliday, with Edmon Ryan and William A. Lee reprising their roles from the original production. The cavernous City Center main stage meant new set designer Eldon Elder could forego Mielziner's mobile platforms. The production was directed by Morton DaCosta along much the same lines as the original staging, according to reviewer John Chapman.

== Adaptations ==
=== Film ===
A 1948 screen version, directed by Mitchell Leisen, starred Betty Hutton, Macdonald Carey, Peggy Wood, and Walter Abel.

=== Radio ===
On September 11, 1949, John Lund and Field starred in an adaptation of Dream Girl on Theatre Guild on the Air.

=== Television ===
In 1955 a televised version adapted by S. Mark Smith was presented in the Hallmark Hall of Fame series. It starred Vivian Blaine. In 1969 a second televised version was proposed in Italy. It starred Adriana Asti and Mariano Rigillo.

=== Stage musical ===
In 1965, it was adapted for the Broadway musical stage under the title Skyscraper.
