= John F. Wharton (lawyer) =

American lawyer and writer

John Franklin Wharton (1894–1977) was a prominent American lawyer and founding partner of Paul, Weiss, Rifkind, Wharton & Garrison LLP. Wharton's work was steeped in the classic era of Broadway theatre; he was an aficionado of the stage from his youth, and his practice as a lawyer developed around a series of representations that helped shape the theater business in the United States.

== Biography ==
Born in Newark, New Jersey, Wharton attended Williams College, New York Law School and Columbia Law School, which awarded him a Bachelor of Law in 1920. With fellow Columbia Law student Louis Weiss, Wharton formed the predecessor firm that would eventually become Paul, Weiss, Rifkind, Wharton & Garrison LLP. He served as partner in the firm until his retirement in 1977.

Wharton's second marriage was to Betty Ann Fisher, an actress who performed under the stage name Mary Mason.

== Career ==
=== Theatrical Work ===
Wharton's work in theatrical representations began early in his career with Dwight Deere Wiman, a prominent Broadway producer. Wiman introduced Wharton to Cole Porter, who became one of Wharton's enduring clients; Wharton was named by Porter as one co-executor of his estate and the sole trustee of the Cole Porter Musical and Literary Property Trusts.

Wharton represented many other theatre and film artists, including Selznick International Pictures during the filming of Gone With the Wind. He also became involved in producing theatre as well: along with writers Maxwell Anderson, Elmer Rice, Sidney Howard, Robert E. Sherwood and S.N. Behrman, Wharton founded the Playwrights' Company in 1938.

Wharton is also credited with creating contract norms that became standard agreements in the entertainment industry, including a uniform partner agreement that defined the financial interests of producers.

=== Corporate Representations ===
Wharton's work also included non-theatrical clients, such as the interests of the Marshall Field's estates, American Houses, an early housing prefabricator and Benson & Hedges.

=== Published works ===
Wharton was an accomplished author, with several titles to his credit, including books on economics ("The Theory and Practice of Making a Living" and "The Road to Recovery") as well as a memoir of his time with the Playwright's Company ("Life Among the Playwrights"), and a novel ("The Explorations of George Burton") that dealt with psychology, an interest of his throughout his career.

== Sources ==
- Seigel, Max H. (November 25, 1977). "John Wharton Dies, Theater Aficionado". The New York Times.
- Wharton, John F. (1951). The Explorations of George Burton. New York: Simon & Schuster.
