= Key to the City (film) =

1950 film by George Sidney

- Directed by: George Sidney
- Screenplay by: Robert Riley Crutcher
- Story by: Albert Beich
- Produced by: Z. Wayne Griffin
- Starring: Clark Gable; Loretta Young
- Cinematography: Harold Rosson
- Edited by: James E. Newcom
- Music by: Bronislau Kaper
- Production company: Metro-Goldwyn-Mayer
- Release dates: February 1, 1950 (New York); March 16, 1950 (Los Angeles)
- Running time: 99-101 minutes
- Country: United States
- Language: English
- Budget: $1.5 million
- Box office: $2.9 million

Key to the City is a 1950 American romantic comedy film starring Clark Gable and Loretta Young as mayors who meet in San Francisco and fall in love.

== Plot ==
At a convention in San Francisco, Steve Fisk, the mayor of the municipality of Puget City, mistakes Clarissa Standish, the mayor of Wenonah, Maine, for a "balloon dancer" whom he was expecting.

As a former longshoreman, Steve feels that Clarissa might be too refined for him, but he is attracted to her. However, he must beware of crooked city councilman Les Taggart, who would happily exploit a scandal to politically damage Steve back in Puget City.

Steve inadvertently causes Clarissa to be arrested twice, first after a brawl in a Chinatown restaurant and then on their way to a costume party. A photographer snaps a picture of Clarissa that creates the appearance that she is at the police station for public drunkenness. Her uncle, Judge Silas Standish, is happy that Clarissa may be finally shedding her prim exterior.

The balloon dancer Sheila appears, causing Clarissa to incorrectly conclude that Steve wants to see her. Clarissa is irate when Steve disappears, unaware that he hurried home for a hastily called council vote. Steve wants to marry Clarissa and present her with the key to his city.

== Cast ==
- Clark Gable as Steve Fisk
- Loretta Young as Clarissa Standish
- Frank Morgan as Fire Chief Duggan (in his final completed feature film appearance)
- Marilyn Maxwell as Sheila the "Atom Dancer"
- Raymond Burr as Les Taggart
- James Gleason as Sergeant Hogan
- Lewis Stone as Judge Silas Standish
- Raymond Walburn as Mayor Billy Butler
- Pamela Britton as Miss Unconscious
- Zamah Cunningham as Mrs. Butler
- Clinton Sundberg as Clerk
- Marion Martin as Emmy
- Bert Freed as Emmy's Husband
- Emory Parnell as Council Chairman
- Clara Blandick as Liza
- Eula Morgan as Police Matron

== Production ==
Key to the City paired Gable and Young for the first time since Call of the Wild (1935), when their off-camera tryst produced a secret daughter, Judy Lewis. Gable also appeared with James Gleason for the first time since A Free Soul in 1931.

Mervyn LeRoy was first named as the film's director but was reassigned to East Side, West Side, with George Sidney announced as his replacement in May 1949.

The casting of Barry Fitzgerald as Chief Duggan was announced in June 1949 but required foot surgery and was unable to take the role, with Frank Morgan named soon after. Morgan, the real-life honorary mayor of Borrego Springs, California, lobbied to have some of his scenes filmed there, which were to be his final onscreen appearance.

Pasadena City Hall was used as the location for exterior shots of the fictional Puget City's city hall.

== Reception ==
In a contemporary review for The New York Times, critic Bosley Crowther called Key to the City "a bumpy, uneven ride which still has enough motion in it to shake your mid-region insides" and wrote:

No one can say that Clark Gable hasn't the gumption, the punch and the rugged professional resolution to fight his way out of a paper bag—because that, in a manner of speaking, is precisely what he is doing in the Metro's "Key to the City" ... and the old Gable claws his way through it and out of it with conspicuous drive. What is more, he drags along with him Loretta Young, Frank Morgan, Lewis Stone and a whole cast of lesser performers who would have been all tangled up without him. This is by way of noting that this latest romantic farce from the handicraft shop of Metro is a flimsy but obstinate affair which might easily tax the patience of everyone, if it weren't for Mr. G. For It is one of those fabricated items, based on a "cute" idea, in which a number of farce situations, one piled on another, make the show—or, at least. a theatrical structure that depends for its· vitality upon the forcefulness of its players, and this Mr. Gable provides.

Critic Edwin Schallert of the Los Angeles Times wrote:

Using well worn devices in a spirited way, "Key to the City" is a first-rate robust comedy that should pay off well as entertainment for the great majority or people. ... The one fault that might be charged against the film is that certain air of pretense which seems to go with features that boast big-star names, which verges on self-consciousness. This is not too obtrusive, except in the love scene in the fog as too lengthily paced, and some other episodes that are overdrawn. ... Occasional evidences of tedium in the film will have to be ascribed to the fact that its elements are often basically too familiar."

According to MGM records, the film earned $2,296,000 in the U.S. and Canada and $677,000 elsewhere, resulting in a profit of $298,000.
