= Dream Girl (1948 film) =

1948 film by Mitchell Leisen

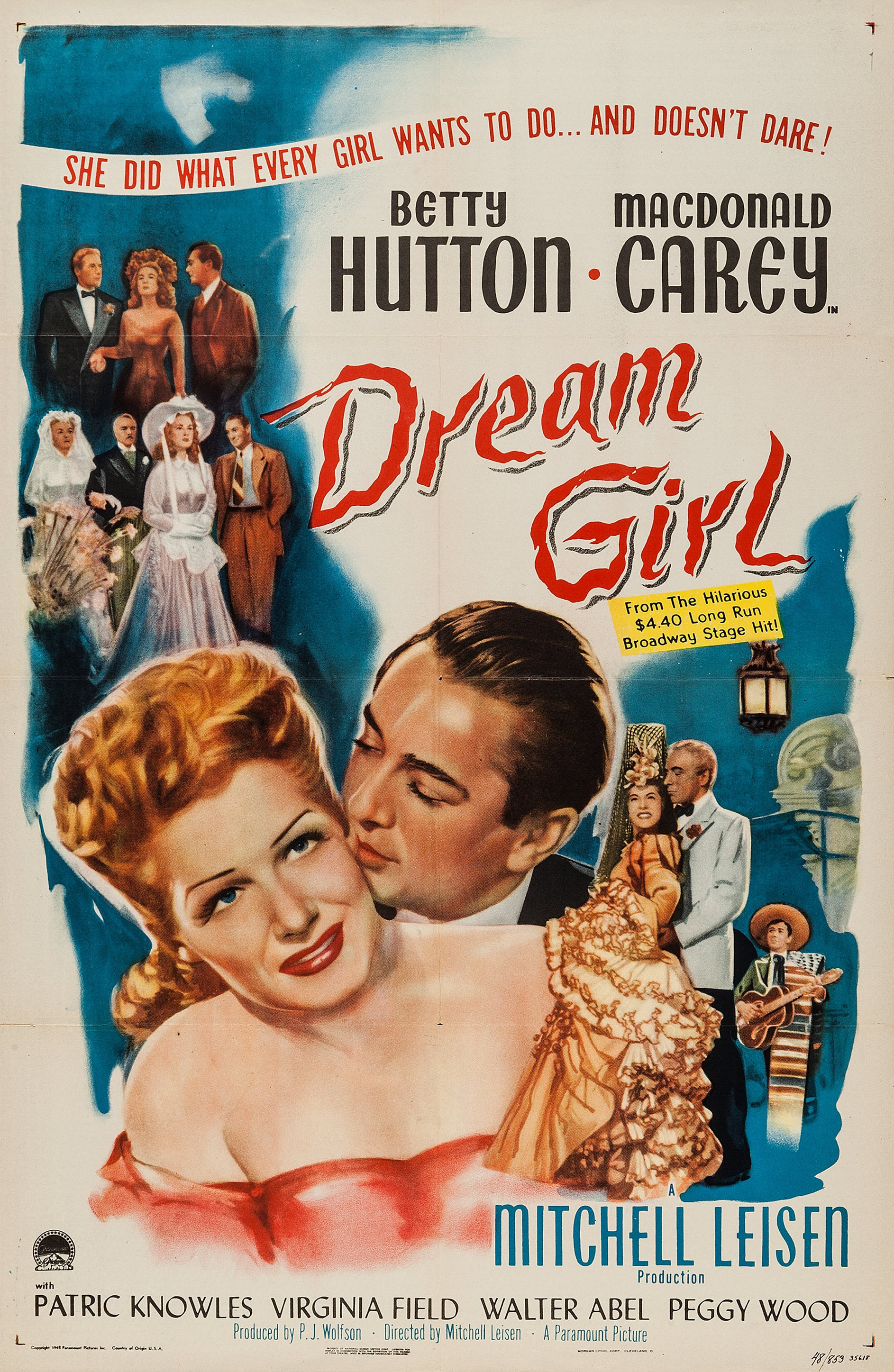
- Theatrical release poster
- Directed by: Mitchell Leisen
- Written by: Elmer Rice; Arthur Sheekman
- Based on: Dream Girl (play) by Elmer Rice
- Produced by: P. J. Wolfson
- Starring: Betty Hutton; Macdonald Carey; Patric Knowles; Virginia Field; Walter Abel; Peggy Wood
- Cinematography: Daniel L. Fapp
- Edited by: Alma Macrorie
- Music by: Victor Young
- Production company: Paramount Pictures
- Distributed by: Paramount Pictures
- Release date: June 16, 1948 (New York City)
- Running time: 85 minutes
- Country: United States
- Language: English

Dream Girl is a 1948 American romantic drama comedy film directed by Mitchell Leisen. Produced and released by Paramount Pictures, the film stars Betty Hutton and Macdonald Carey, with Patric Knowles, Virginia Field, Walter Abel, Peggy Wood, Carolyn Butler, Lowell Gilmore, Zamah Cunningham and Frank Puglia. The film is adapted from the 1945 play of the same name by Elmer Rice.

Two original songs were written for the film, both by songwriting duo Jay Livingston and Ray Evans. The film centers on the life and daydreams of Georgina Allerton, played by Hutton. Her infatuation with her brother-in-law Jim Lucas, played by Knowles and her relationship with the brash book reviewer, Clark Redfield, played by Carey.

== Plot ==
The wealthy Allerton family prepares for their daughter, Miriam Allerton, to wed James "Jim" Lucas. Miriam’s unmarried younger sister Georgina "Georgie" Allerton lectures Miriam on marriage, but only because she is secretly in love with Jim. Shortly before the wedding begins, Georgina runs into Clarke Redfield, a book reviewer. Clarke reveals he and Jim were classmates at college and that Jim was voted “most likely to marry rich” by his classmates. Georgina staunchly defends Jim and storms off.

During the wedding ceremony, Georgina slips into a daydream where she imagines Jim rejecting Miriam at the altar and confessing his love for Georgina. Georgina falls out of the daydream as Jim and Miriam kiss after exchanging vows. A dejected Georgina leaves the wedding.

Some time passes and Georgina is being romantically pursued by Clarke, though she remains in love with Jim, who has recently gone into the publishing business. Georgina also runs a bookshop with friend Claire Bleakley. Jim approaches Georgina and reveals that he has quit his publishing firm. Later, Clarke reveals to Georgina that Jim was kicked out of his firm because he turned down a novel that is now a best-seller.

When Miriam discovers that Jim turned down the book she becomes enraged and storms out. Jim starts flirting with Georgina but she nervously rejects his advances and tells him she has a date. Georgina calls Claire and demands she set her up with someone. Claire sets Georgina up at a nightclub with George Hand who unbeknownst to Georgina, is married. George offers to take Georgina to Mexico.

Clark catches wind of Georgina’s relationship with George and reveals to Georgina that George is married. Georgina falls into a daydream where she is in Mexico with George, but Clarke appears and brings George’s wife, Molly. Molly accuses Georgina of being a “husband thief” and pulls a gun on her. As Georgina attempts to wrestle the gun from Molly, it fires, killing Molly. Georgina goes on the run and becomes a honky-tonk singer. After a performance, Clarke confronts Georgina and calls the police on her, and Georgina commits suicide. She dies in the hands of Jim, who had appeared.

Georgina’s death in the daydream prompts her to slip out of it. Georgina rejects George’s offer and leaves the nightclub. The next day, Clarke calls Georgina and invites her to a performance of Madama Butterfly at the opera, which she agrees to. Immediately afterwards, Jim invites Georgina to dinner but she declines. Georgina’s mother, Lucy, tells her that Jim and Miriam are divorcing and that Jim was merely using the Allerton’s for their money to fund his business ventures. Lucy plans to fly Jim out to Reno for the divorce.

As Georgina is preparing for her date, Jim finds her. He tells Georgina that he never loved Miriam, but instead always loved her. Jim offers to take Georgina to Reno with him after her date with Clarke, which she agrees to.

At the opera, Clarke mocks Georgina, causing her to fall into a daydream, where she is performing as Madama Butterfly. Clarke is impressed by Georgina’s performance and apologises to her. Georgina falls out of the daydream, only to find Clarke scolding her. After the opera, Clarke takes Georgina to a malt shop where he warns her that if she continues constantly daydreaming, it will result in her losing her mind. Georgina falls for Clarke and calls her parents to inform them that she and Clarke are getting married.

== Cast ==
- Betty Hutton as Georgina 'Georgie' Allerton
- Macdonald Carey as Clark Redfield
- Patric Knowles as Jim Lucas
- Virginia Field as Miriam Allerton Lucas
- Walter Abel as George Allerton
- Peggy Wood as Lucy Allerton
- Selmer Jackson as Judge "Jed" Allerton
- Carolyn Butler as Claire Bleakley
- Lowell Gilmore as George Hand
- Zamah Cunningham as Mme. Kimmelhoff (music teacher)
- Frank Puglia as Antonio
- Georgia Backus as Edna
- Charles Meredith as Charles
- Dorothy Christy as Molly Hand (uncredited)
- Joesph J. Lilley as Piano Player (uncredited)

== Soundtrack ==
The original songs from the film were written by songwriting duo Jay Livingston and Ray Evans.

- "Dream Girl" — (Written by Jay Livingston and Ray Evans)
- "Drunk with Love" — (Written by Jay Livingston and Ray Evans) Performed by Betty Hutton
- "One Fine Day (Un Bel Di)" — (Written by Giacomo Puccini, Giuseppe Giacosa and Luigi Illica) Performed by Betty Hutton (dubbed by Nadine Conner)

The title song, "Dream Girl", was covered by multiple artists including Harry James and his Orchestra. The title song was later played during the Larrabee party scene in the 1954 film Sabrina.

== Production ==
Before Dream Girl (play) debuted in December, 1945, Paramount Pictures had agreed to pay $50,000 to fund the production of the play as well as a $100,000 down payment for the screen rights. When Dream Girl (film) released, The New York Times reported that Paramount ended up paying over $200,000 for the screen rights to the play.

The film was originally to be produced in Technicolor. Filming started in May, 1947 and continued until July, 1947.

Fellow Paramount actress Joan Caulfield claimed that "Paramount had bought Dream Girl for me, it was to be my big starring role. But Betty Hutton was queen of the lot, and she got the picture."

== Release and reception ==
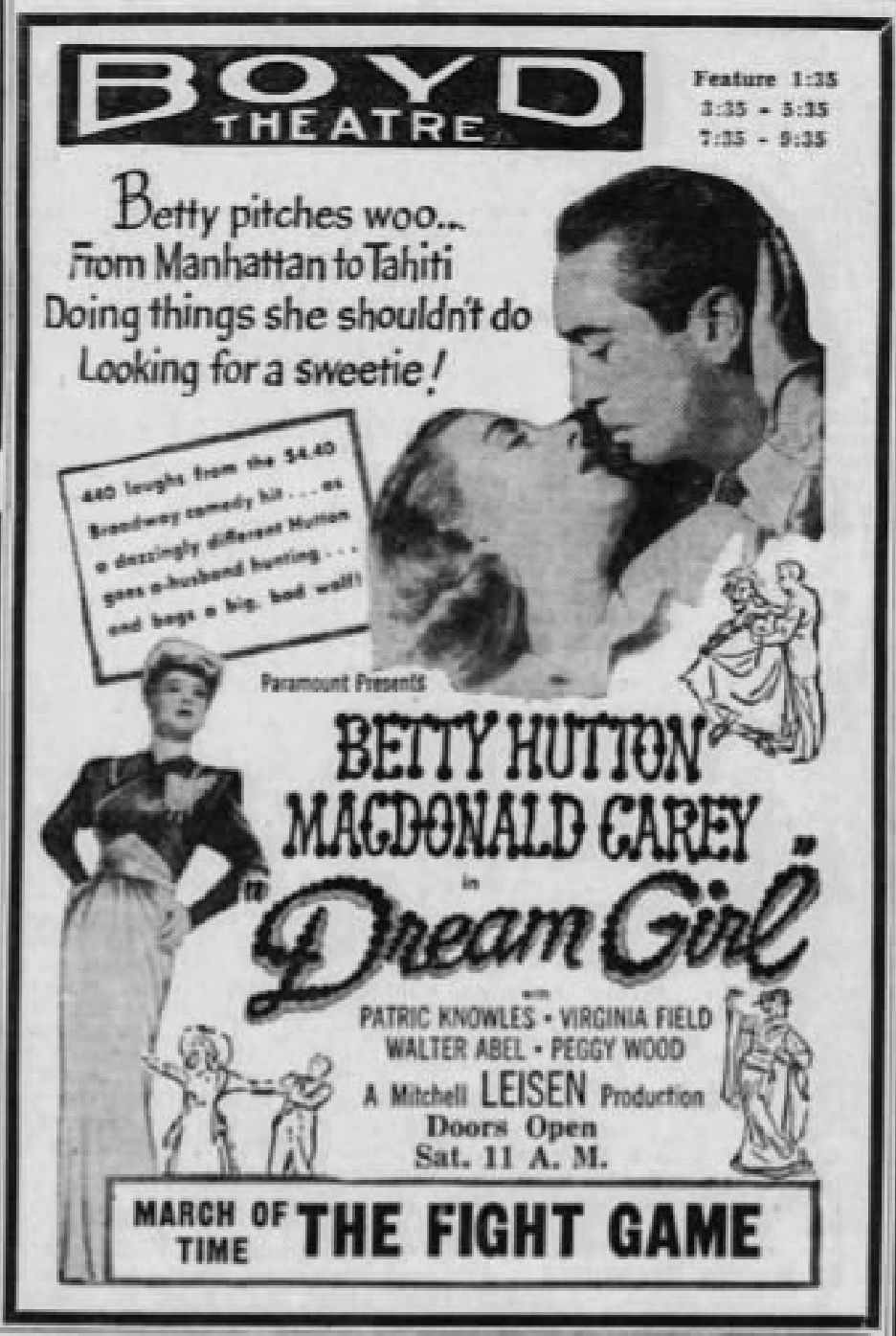
Newspaper advertisement in The Morning Call

Dream Girl premiered at the Paramount Theatre in New York City on June 16th, 1948 and was opened by Phil Spitalny and his all female band.

Bosley Crowther wrote a negative review for Dream Girl in The New York Times, writing that, "In transferring Mr. Rice's play about a light-headed little cookie who spends half of her time in wild day-dreams, Paramount and Mitchell Leisen have done a couple of unforgivable things: they have "Hollywoodized" the whole idea and then have drowned it in a torrent of words ... Mr. Leisen has forgotten that motion pictures should move and not bog down in soggy stretches of back-and-forth he-and-she talk. No matter how bright the conversation—and some of Mr. Rice's lines are bright—too much sitting down and talking usually makes for a wearying film. In this case, the dialogue, while breezy, has a certain laboriousness which is meagrely compensated by a few chunks of burlesque fantasy."

Variety gave a positive review of Leisen's direction and Hutton's performance writing that, "The screen treatment is naturally, and perhaps properly, broader than the original play. This results primarily from the production and Mitchell Leisen’s direction rather than from the Arthur Sheekman adaptation. Thus, the film turns the play’s humor into outright comedy and sometimes into slapstick ... As the self-preoccupied heroine, Betty Hutton gives one of her most skillful performances to date. Besides her familiar vitality and drive, she underscores the comedy in the part and does reasonably well dramatically."

The Motion Picture Herald wrote of the film, "The producer did his casting well in nominating Betty Hutton for the title role in this generally amusing comedy based on the successful Broadway stage play of the same name by Elmer Rice. Miss Hutton does well in the main although some of her reactions bear virtually no resemblance to the department of ordinary walking around humans. She is supposed to be in a daze most of the time, it is true, but 85 minutes are a lot of minutes to stay that way. Carey is first-class and highly personable."
