= Candle in the Wind (play) =

1941 Broadway three-act drama written by Maxwell Anderson

- Written by: Maxwell Anderson
- Original language: English
- Genre: Drama
- Setting: France

Premiere
- Date premiered: October 22, 1941
- Place premiered: Shubert Theatre; New York City, New York

Candle in the Wind was a 1941 Broadway three-act drama written by Maxwell Anderson, produced by the Theatre Guild and the Playwrights' Company and directed by Alfred Lunt. Jo Mielziner created the scenic and lighting design. It ran for 95 performances from October 22, 1941 to January 10, 1942 at the Shubert Theatre as a part of the 1941-1942 play season. It was included in Burns Mantle's The Best Plays of 1941-1942.

Film rights were sold to Fox for $35,000.

== Characters ==
- Madeline Guest - A very persistent American actress who falls in love with Raoul.
- Cissie - A Viennese woman who is an expert of being on the run from German soldiers.
- Maisie Tompkins - A tall, broad American woman, Madeline's friend.
- Charlotte and Mercy - School teachers from New Hampshire who are fascinated with Marie Antoinette.
- Col. Erfurt - Leader of this concentration camp.
- Lt. Schoen - Col. Erfurt's right-hand man.
- Corporal Mueller - Attempts to aid Madeline but isn't very trustworthy.
- Raoul St. Cloud - A French journalist who gets captured by the Germans.
- M. and Madame Fleury - A French couple who are allowed to see their son only to get information for the Germans.
- Fargeau - A workman who is very proud of being French.
- Deseze - A park attendant.
- Henri - A janitor.

=== Original cast ===
- Helen Hayes as Madeline Guest
- Lotte Lenya as Cissie
- Leona Roberts as Charlotte
- Tonio Selwart as Lt. Schoen
- Evelyn Varden as Maisie Tompkins
- John Wengraf as Col. Erfurt
- Joseph Wiseman as Corporal Mueller
- Louis Borel as Raoul St. Cloud
- Philip White as Fargeau
- Stanley Jessup as M. Fleury
- Michelette Burani as Madame Fleury
- Brian Connaught as first guard
- Ferdi Hoffman second guard
- George Andre as third guard
- Guy Moneypenny as fourth guard
- Bruce Fernald as Captain
- Mario Gang as Corporal Behrens
- Nell Harrison as Mercy
- Robert Harrison as Deseze
- Knud Kreuger as German Lt.
- Benedict MacQuarrie as Henri
- William Malten as Corporal Schultz
- Harro Meller as German Captain

== Plot ==
=== Setting ===
1940s France. The gardens at Versailles, the concentration camp and Madeline's hotel suite. The play takes place during the German occupation of France in World War II.

=== Act 1 ===
September 1940. Fargeau, Henri and Deseze are talking about the war, Charlotte and Mercy are visiting from America and are trying to rebuild the past. They want to see Versailles as it was in Marie Antoinette's time. They are upset because the land and history changed too much. Madeline is avoiding Maisie because she has fallen in love and doesn't want to go back to America. She tells Maisie all about Raoul St. Cloud. Moments later he appears in the distance and tells Madeline about his adventures in the war, how his ship sank and he helped hijack a plane. He and Madeline pick up where they left off in their relationship. German soldiers enter and seeing Raoul in a French uniform, ask for his papers. Raoul, unable to produce them, saying they are lost at sea; gets arrested and taken to a concentration camp.

At the concentration camp, Colonel Erfurt allows the Fleury family to see their son only if they agree to help gather information for the German party. They hesitate, but ultimately give in because they want to see their son. They are mortified by what they see in the camp. He denies Madeline access to Raoul because he has Sterben written on his file. He says “This is a camp of dead men.” Madeline vows that she will see Raoul again.

=== Act 2 ===
Exactly one year later. Cissie and Maisie talk about France's condition in Madeline's hotel room. Maisie is hungry and nervous about German soldiers barging in on them. Cissie reassures her that they will not come. Madeline and Colonel Mueller talk about plans to break Raoul out and the three women will leave for London the next afternoon after the plan unfolds. The plan fails.

Madeline tells the girls to unpack, they are staying. Maisie tells her that the best way she can help Raoul is by going back to America, back to work and get more money. Lieutenant Schoen arrives saying that he knows a fool proof way to get Raoul out of the camp. Maisie and Cissie leave to get Cissie a visa.

Madeline and Lt. Schoen talk about the plan and she gives him her ring to pawn for money as a gift for helping her and Raoul. Lt. Schoen leaves his number, saying that if he can get Raoul out the following day, he will call.

=== Act 3 ===
The next day, back at the gardens. Henri reads the executed list in the paper and sees Fargeau's name on the list. He always said that he'd rather be who he is and die for it than live as someone the Germans want him to be. Fargeau died trying to buy a gun, the shop didn't have any so he killed a German officer for one. Henri and Deseze mourn him for a moment as Madeline enters. Lt. Schoen never called but meets her at the gardens. He delivers good news that the plan worked and Raoul will be there any moment. Raoul arrives and Madeline is delighted. They immediately embrace, still as in love with each other as they were a year ago. She tells him to go to London and wait for her. But after he leaves, German soldiers arrive at the gardens and begin questioning Madeline. She obliges, thinking that the longer the soldiers are with her, the further away Raoul will get from France. Col. Erfurt and Madeline argue and he ends up confiscating Madeline's passport, leaving her to be a prisoner in France. Madeline and Raoul do not end up together.

=== Title ===
The idiom Candle in the Wind means something fragile which could finish at any time, a constant fight against all odds. Madeline and Raoul's love is a candle in the wind: the constant fight to free Raoul, even after a year, and the hope that he still loves her.
