= Zamah Cunningham =

American actress

- Cunningham in 1931
- Born: November 29, 1892; Portland, Oregon, U.S.
- Died: June 2, 1967 (aged 74); New York City, New York, U.S.
- Occupation: Actress
- Years active: 1924–1965

Zamah Cunningham (November 29, 1892 – June 2, 1967) was an American stage, film, and television actress. She began her career appearing in uncredited bit parts for D. W. Griffith, making her film debut in his 1924 silent feature, America. She later had an extensive career on Broadway, making her stage debut there in 1933's Give Us This Day. Cunningham went on to appear in numerous stage plays over the following several decades, though she publicly commented that most of her plays were "flops."

In her later career, she appeared in several films, including Dream Girl (1948), Here Come the Girls (1953), and Baby the Rain Must Fall (1965). Beginning in 1956, she made several guest appearances as Angelina Manicotti, neighbor of the Kramdens on the sitcom The Honeymooners. Cunningham died at Roosevelt Hospital in Manhattan in June 1967, aged 74.

== Life and career ==
Cunningham was born in 1892 in Portland, Oregon. At age two, she relocated with her family to Carthage, Missouri. She began her career as a singer before relocating to New York City to study acting. After appearing in local stage productions, she was secured a working contract with D. W. Griffith, appearing in uncredited bit parts in his films. In 1924, she made her film debut in Germany, appearing in Griffith's America. She subsequently studied music in Paris, and was given opportunity to appear in productions at the Opera Comique. She later returned to the United States, where she joined the Chicago Playhouse and appeared in regional productions.

Cunningham made her Broadway debut in 1933's Give Us This Day. She went on to appear in over 20 Broadway productions over the following two decades, including Medicine Show (1940), On the Town (1944) and The Shadow of a Gunman (1958). Reflecting on her stage career in 1944, she commented: "In the past 20 years I've been in fifty plays—mostly flops."

Later film roles included Dream Girl (1948), Key to the City (1950), and Here Come the Girls (1953). She made her final film appearance in Baby the Rain Must Fall (1965).

Cunningham spent her later life living at the Park Royal Hotel on 23 West 73rd Street in Manhattan's Upper West Side. In her early seventies, she suffered a stroke.

== Death ==
Cunningham died at Roosevelt Hospital in Manhattan on June 2, 1967. She was interred at Avilla Cemetery in Avilla, Missouri.

== Filmography ==
=== Film ===
Year	Title	Role	Notes	Ref.
1924	America	Unknown		
1948	Dream Girl	Mme. Kimmelhoff		
1950	Key to the City	Mrs. Butler		
1950	Menasha the Magnificent	Mrs. Davis	Short	
1953	Here Come the Girls	Emily Snodgrass		
1965	Baby the Rain Must Fall	Mrs. T.V. Smith	(final film role)	

=== Television ===
Year	Title	Role	Notes	Ref.
1952	The Ed Sullivan Show	Bakery Customer	Segment: "Pour Soul Ketch"	
1953–1956	Studio One in Hollywood	Mrs. Lagerloff / Aunt Madge / Lusadia	3 episodes	
1953–1957	The Jackie Gleason Show	Angelina Manciotti; Various	13 episodes	
1956	The Honeymooners	Angelina Manicotti	3 episodes	
1959	Playhouse 90	Mrs. Gross	Episode: "The Silver Whistle"	
1961	General Electric Theater	Eva	Episode: " Sis Bowls 'Em Over"	

== Select stage credits ==
Year	Title	Role	Notes	Ref.
1931	Apron Strings		Chicago Playhouse	
1931	The Vagabond King	Katherine de Vaucelles	Northrop Auditorium, Minneapolis, Minnesota	
1933	Give Us This Day	Anne Strong	Booth Theatre	
1934	Gentlewoman	Mrs. Stoneleigh	Cort Theatre	
1934	Are You Decent	Peggy Witherspoon	Ambassador Theatre; 49th Street Theatre	
1935	Reprise	Madame	Vanderbilt Theatre	
1935	Triumph	Mrs. Giordana	Fulton Theatre	
1935	The Season Changes	Rita Glenn	Booth Theatre	
1935	Ah, Wilderness!	Mildred Miller	Alvin Theatre, Minneapolis, Minnesota	
1936	Hallowe'en	Edith	Vanderbilt Theatre	
1936–1937	Around the Corner	Sarah Clark	48th Street Theatre	
1937	In Clover	Electa Hornblower	Vanderbilt Theatre	
1937	Siege	Mrs. Perez	Longacre Theatre	
1938	Roosty	Mrs. Adams	Lyceum Theatre	
1938	Run Sheep Run	Mrs. Hopple	Windsor Theatre	
1938	Young Couple Wanted	Mrs. Daly	Maxine Elliott's Theatre	
1940	Medicine Show	Mrs. Young	New Yorker Theatre	
1940	Horse Fever	Mrs. Drum	Mansfield Theatre	
1941	Tanyard Street	Mrs. McMorna	Little Theatre	
1941	The Trojan Women	Marta	Cort Theatre	
1943	Feathers in a Gale	Lucy Abner	Music Box Theatre	
1944	Robin Hood	Dame Durden	Adelphi Theatre	
1944	On the Town	Madame Maude P. Dilly	Adelphi Theatre, 44th Street Theatre, Martin Beck Theatre	
1948	Jenny Kissed Me	Mrs. Deazy	Shubert Theatre, New Haven, Connecticut	
1957	The Glass Menagerie		Playmakers Theatre, Long Branch, New Jersey	
1958–1959	The Shadow of a Gunman	Mrs. Henderson	Bijou Theatre	
1965	Minor Miracle	Mrs. Fuller	Henry Miller's Theatre	
