= Sam Zolotow =

American theatre critic

Samuel Tecumseh Zolotow (May 18, 1898 – October 21, 1993) was an American theater reporter for The New York Times who was known for his tenacity in getting the details about how Broadway shows were performing, relentlessly pursuing producers, press agents and the crowds attending opening nights to get the details he needed for his stories and columns during his half century at the newspaper.

== Theater reporting ==
Zolotow served in the United States Navy, enlisting 6 June 1917. Zolotow rose to Pharmacist Mate 3rd class and served stateside at Naval Station Newport. He was discharged 24 December 1919. After completing his military service, he was hired in December 1919 by The Times to work as a copyboy, though it was not until the 1930s that he had earned his own byline.

Arthur Gelb, a former theater critic and later managing editor of The Times described Zolotow as someone who could get any theater information he sought, as long as he had "a corned-beef sandwich, a cigar and a telephone... even if it took him all day and all night". Once on the phone with producer Max Gordon, trying to pump him for details with little success, Gordon had to tell Zolotow over the phone "Sam, don't look at me that way". Attending theater openings for decades, he could get his best information by working the crowds. During a 1930s call to Elmer Rice, Zolotow insisted on getting accurate numbers for Rice's current production and was left dumbfounded when Rice retorted "how much money did The New York Times take in last week?"

Over his 50 years with the paper, Zolotow had written five columns weekly, arriving early and doing his best to advocate for inclusion of the copy he wrote for each day's paper. He worked alongside such critics as Brooks Atkinson, Clive Barnes, George S. Kaufman, Stanley Kauffmann, Walter Kerr, Howard Taubman and Alexander Woollcott. A May 1969 retirement party was attended by 500 at the Playbill Restaurant in the Royal Manhattan Hotel, with best wishes sent by individuals from the theater, such as Alfred Lunt, Lynn Fontanne and Leslie Uggams, as well as from Mayor John Lindsay, Senator Jacob K. Javits and President Richard Nixon.

On the side, Zolotow wrote a guide for new theater productions, ran a messenger service and early on would take wagers on horses. He once left a note that he had left on vacation to spend a week at Belmont Park.

== Death ==
A resident of Santa Monica, California, Zolotow died of stomach cancer on October 21, 1993, at age 94 at the Wadsworth Veterans Administration Hospital in West Los Angeles. He was survived by two daughters, two sons, eight grandchildren, and four great-grandchildren. His wife of 70 years had died in 1991.
