= Not for Children =

1934 theatre play

Not for Children is a 1934 play by Elmer Rice. It was premiered in 1935 at the Fortune Theatre in the West End of London. The work was performed for the first time on Broadway on February 13, 1951 at the Coronet Theatre; closing four days later after only seven performances. Incidental music was composer by Robert Emmett Dolan. The production starred Elliott Nugent as Ambrose Atwater, Betty Field as Theodora Effington, J. Edward Bromberg as Timothy Forrest, Ann Thomas as Prudence Dearborn, Keene Crockett as Elijah Silverhammer, Alexander Clark as Clarence Orth, and Joan Copeland as Evangeline Orth.
