= Betty Field =

American actress (1916–1973)

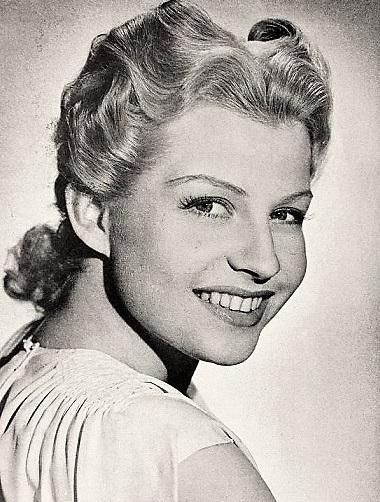
- Field in 1942
- Born: February 8, 1916; Boston, Massachusetts, U.S.
- Died: September 13, 1973 (aged 57); Hyannis, Massachusetts, U.S.
- Occupation: Actress
- Years active: 1934–71
- Spouses: Elmer Rice (m. 1942; div. 1956) Edwin J. Lukas (m. 1957; div. 1967) Raymond Olivere (m. 1968)
- Children: 3

Betty Field (February 8, 1916 – September 13, 1973) was an American film and stage actress.

== Early years ==
Field was born in Boston, Massachusetts, to George and Katharine (née Lynch) Field. She began acting before she reached age 15, and went into stock theater immediately after graduating from high school. She attended the American Academy of Dramatic Arts in New York City.

Producer/director George Abbott is credited with having discovered Field.

== Stage ==
Field began her acting career in 1934 on the London stage in Howard Lindsay's farce She Loves Me Not. Following its run, she returned to the United States, and appeared in several stage successes, then made her film debut in 1939.

Field's Broadway credits include Page Miss Glory (1934), Room Service (1937), Angel Island (1937), If I Were You (1938), What a Life (1938), The Primrose Path (1939), Ring Two (1939), Two on an Island (1940), Flight to the West (1940), A New Life (1943), The Voice of the Turtle (1943), Dream Girl (1945), The Rat Race (1949), Not for Children (1951), The Fourposter (1951), The Ladies of the Corridor (1953), Festival (1955), The Waltz of the Toreadors (1958), A Touch of the Poet (1958), A Loss of Roses (1959), Strange Interlude (1963), Where's Daddy? (1966), and All Over (1971).

Her final stage performances were in three productions at Lincoln Center for the Performing Arts in 1971.

== Film ==
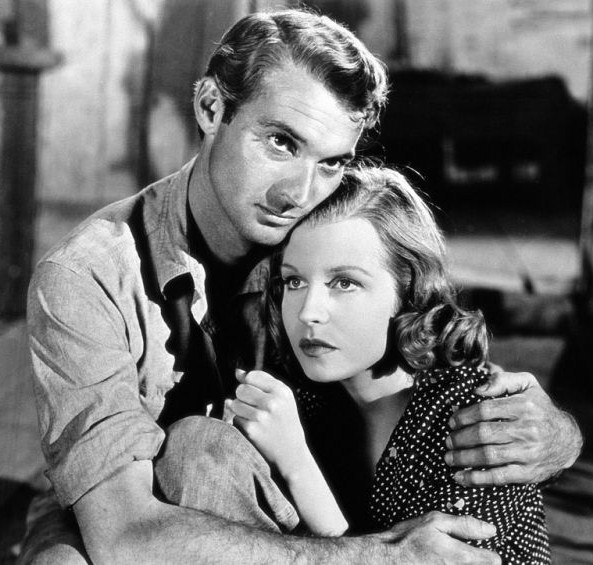
With Zachary Scott in The Southerner (1945)

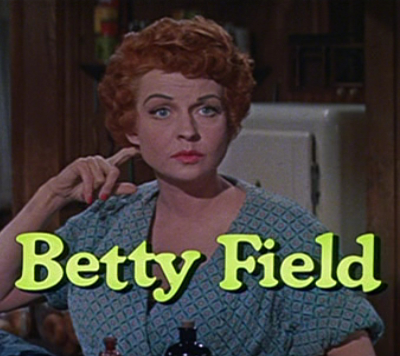
Field in a scene from Bus Stop (1956)

Field had to overcome obstacles early in her film career. A 1942 newspaper article reported:

When Betty Field was first signed for pictures, conversation buzzed. "But she's not pretty," was the first objection. "And her mouth is too large."

Field's role as Curly's wife, Mae, the sole female character in Of Mice and Men (1939) established her as a dramatic actress. She starred opposite John Wayne in the 1941 movie The Shepherd of the Hills. Field played a supporting, yet significant role as Cassandra Tower in Kings Row (1942).

A life member of The Actors Studio, Field preferred performing on Broadway and appeared in Elmer Rice's Dream Girl and Jean Anouilh's The Waltz of the Toreadors, but returned to Hollywood regularly, appearing in Flesh and Fantasy (1943), The Southerner (1945), as Daisy Buchanan in The Great Gatsby (1949) with Alan Ladd, Picnic (1955) with William Holden and Kim Novak, Bus Stop (1956) with Marilyn Monroe, Peyton Place (1957) (for which she was nominated for a Laurel Award), Hound-Dog Man (1959) with Carol Lynley and Stuart Whitman, BUtterfield 8 (1960) with Elizabeth Taylor, Birdman of Alcatraz (1962) with Burt Lancaster, 7 Women (1966) with Anne Bancroft and How to Save a Marriage and Ruin Your Life (1968) with Dean Martin and Stella Stevens. Her final film role was in Coogan's Bluff with Clint Eastwood and Susan Clark in 1968.

== TV and radio ==
Field made many guest appearances on series television including Route 66, The Untouchables, General Electric Theater, Alfred Hitchcock Presents, Dr. Kildare, Ben Casey, The Defenders and several others. Field portrayed Barbara Pearson on the radio series The Aldrich Family. On radio, she also appeared on Old Gold Comedy Theater, Studio One and Suspense.

== Personal life ==
Field's first marriage, to playwright Elmer Rice, ended in divorce in May 1956. The couple had three children, John, Paul, and Judith. John became a lawyer and died in a swimming accident at age 40. Field's second marriage, to Edwin J. Lukas, lasted from 1957 to 1967. Her third marriage, to Raymond Olivere, lasted from 1968 until her death in 1973.

Field died from a cerebral hemorrhage on September 13, 1973, at Cape Cod Hospital in Hyannis, Massachusetts, aged 57. (Another source says she was 55.)

== Filmography ==
Year	Title	Role	Notes
1939	What a Life	Barbara Pearson	
1939	Of Mice and Men	Mae Jackson	
1940	Seventeen	Lola Pratt	
1940	Victory	Alma	
1941	The Shepherd of the Hills	Sammy Lane	
1941	Blues in the Night	Kay Grant	
1942	Kings Row	Cassandra Tower	
1942	Are Husbands Necessary?	Mary Elizabeth Cugat	
1943	Flesh and Fantasy	Henrietta	(Episode 1)
1944	The Great Moment	Elizabeth Morton	
1944	Tomorrow, the World!	Leona Richards	
1945	The Southerner	Nona Tucker	
1949	The Great Gatsby	Daisy Buchanan	
1955	Picnic	Flo Owens	
1956	Bus Stop	Grace	
1957	Peyton Place	Nellie Cross	
1959	Hound-Dog Man	Cora McKinney	
1960	Alfred Hitchcock Presents	Helen	Season 6 Episode 3: "Very Moral Theft"
1960	BUtterfield 8	Fanny Thurber	
1962	Birdman of Alcatraz	Stella Johnson	
1963	The Alfred Hitchcock Hour	Jenny Davies	Season 1 Episode 24: "The Star Juror"
1966	7 Women	Florrie Pether	
1968	How to Save a Marriage and Ruin Your Life	Thelma	
1968	Coogan's Bluff	Ellen Ringerman	
