= Elmer Rice =

American playwright (1892–1967)

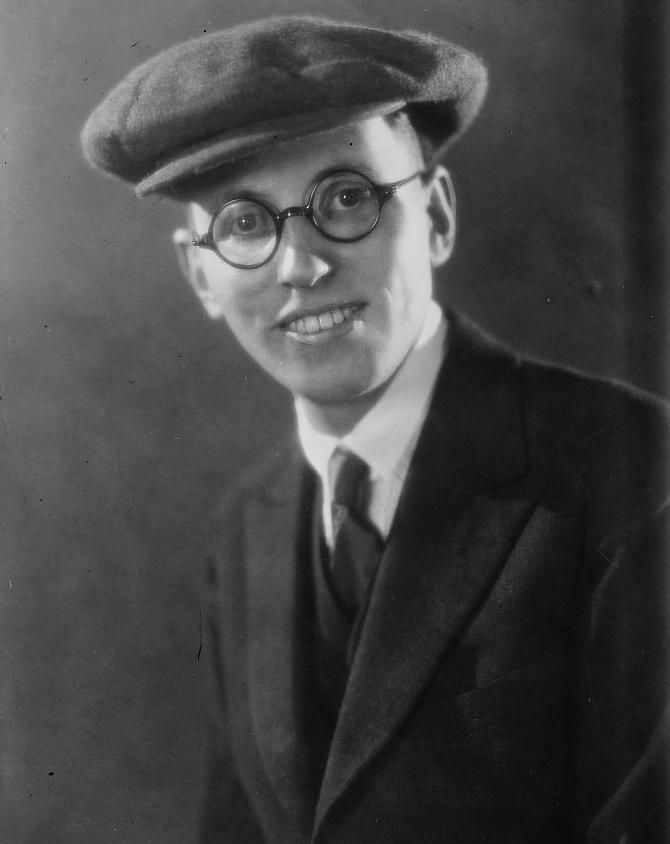
- Rice circa 1920
- Born: Elmer Leopold Reizenstein; September 28, 1892; New York City, U.S.
- Died: May 8, 1967 (aged 74); Southampton, Hampshire, England
- Education: New York Law School (LLB)
- Occupation: Playwright
- Spouse(s): Betty Field (1942-1956); Hazel Levy (1915-1942); Barbara Ambrose (1967-his death)
- Writing career
- Notable awards: Pulitzer Prize for Drama (1929)

Elmer Rice (born Elmer Leopold Reizenstein, September 28, 1892 – May 8, 1967) was an American playwright. He is best known for his plays The Adding Machine (1923) and his Pulitzer Prize-winning drama of New York tenement life, Street Scene (1929).

== Biography ==
=== Early years ===
Rice was born Elmer Leopold Reizenstein at 127 East 90th Street in New York City. His grandfather was a political activist in the Revolutions of 1848 in the German states. After the failure of that political upheaval, he emigrated to the United States where he became a businessman. He spent most of his retirement years living with the Rice family and developed a close relationship with his grandson Elmer, who became a politically motivated writer and shared his grandfather's liberal and pacifist politics.

A staunch atheist, his grandfather may also have influenced Elmer in his feelings about religion, as he refused to attend Hebrew school or to have a bar mitzvah. In contrast, Rice's relationship with his father was very distant. As he wrote in his autobiography, his grandfather and his Uncle Will, both of whom boarded with the family, made up for the affection and attention his father withheld. A child of the tenements, Rice spent much of his youth reading, to his family's consternation, and later observed, "Nothing in my life has been more helpful than the simple act of joining the library."

Because of his need to support his family when his father's epilepsy worsened, Rice did not complete high school, and he took several menial jobs before earning his diploma by preparing for the state examinations on his own and then applying to law school. Though he disliked legal studies and spent a good deal of class time reading plays in class (because they could be finished within a two-hour lecture, he said), Rice graduated from New York Law School in 1912 and began a short-lived legal career. Leaving the profession in 1914, he was always to retain a cynical outlook about lawyers, but his two years in a law office provided him with material for several plays, most notably Counsellor-at-Law (1931). Courtroom dramas became a Rice specialty.

Needing to make a living, he decided to try writing full-time. It was a wise decision. His first play, On Trial (1914), a melodramatic murder mystery, was a great success and ran for 365 performances in New York. George M. Cohan offered to buy the rights for $30,000, a proposition Rice declined largely because he did not believe Cohan could be serious. Co-authored with a friend, Frank Harris (not the famed Oscar Wilde biographer), the play was purportedly the first American drama to employ the technique of reverse-chronology, telling the story from its conclusion to its starting-point. On Trial then went on tour throughout the United States with three separate companies and was produced in Argentina, Austria, Canada, France, Germany, the Netherlands, Hungary, Ireland, Japan, Mexico, Norway, Scotland and South Africa. The author ultimately earned $100,000 from his first work for the stage. None of his later plays earned him as much as On Trial. The play was adapted for the cinema three times, in 1917, 1928, and 1939.

Political and social issues occupied Rice's attention in this period as well. World War I and Woodrow Wilson's conservatism confirmed him in his criticism of the status quo. (He had been firmly converted to socialism in his teens, he said, by reading George Bernard Shaw, H. G. Wells, John Galsworthy, Maxim Gorky, Frank Norris, and Upton Sinclair.) He frequented Greenwich Village, then the most bohemian part of New York City, in the late 1910s and became friendly with many socially conscious writers and activists, including the African-American poet James Weldon Johnson and the illustrator Art Young.

=== Career ===
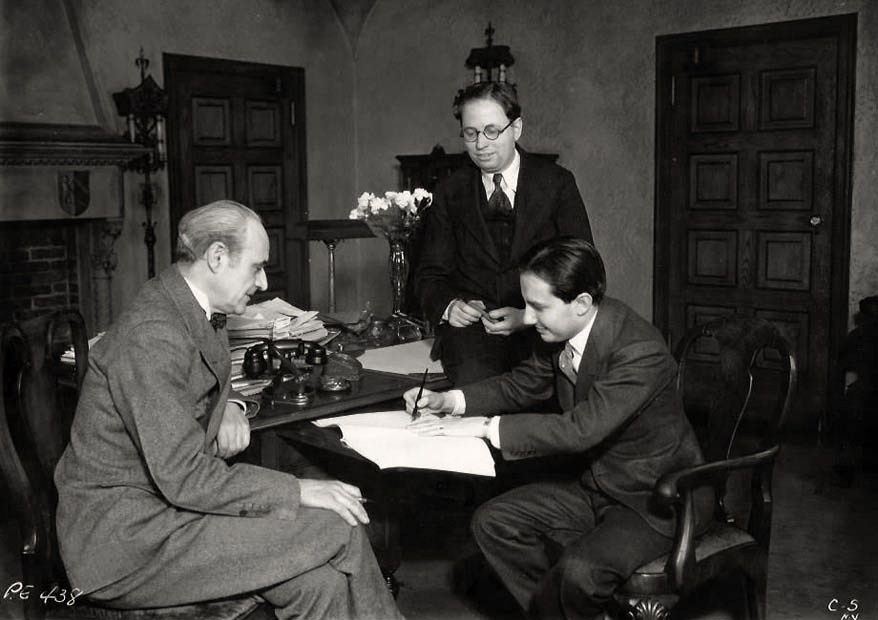
From left, Joseph P. Bickerton, Jr. (theatre producer), Elmer Rice (playwright) and Carl Laemmle Jr. (Universal producer) sign a contract for the film version of Counsellor at Law

After writing four more plays of no special distinction, Rice startled audiences in 1923 with his next contribution to the theatre, the boldly expressionistic The Adding Machine, which he wrote in 17 days. A satire about the growing regimentation of life in the machine age, the play tells the story of the life, death, and bizarre afterlife of a dull bookkeeper, Mr. Zero. When Mr. Zero, a mere cog in the corporate machine, discovers that he is to be replaced at work by an adding machine, he snaps and murders his boss. After his trial and execution, he enters the next life only to confront some of the same issues and, judged to be of minimal use in heaven, is sent back to Earth for recycling. Theatre critic Brooks Atkinson called it "the most original and brilliant play any American had written up to that time ... the harshest and most illuminating play about modern society [Broadway had ever seen]."

Dorothy Parker and Alexander Woollcott were enthusiastic. Other reviewers spoke of him, hyperbolically, as a writer who might become America's Ibsen. Directed with great ingenuity by Philip Moeller, designed by Lee Simonson, and produced by the Theatre Guild, the play starred Dudley Digges (actor) and Edward G. Robinson, then at the start of his acting career. Ironically, it made its author no money at all. (Adapted as an innovatively staged musical in 2007, The Adding Machine enjoyed a successful Off-Broadway run in 2008.)

When Dorothy Parker was at work on her play the following year (loosely based on fellow Algonquin Round Table member Robert Benchley, his marital problems, and the extra-marital temptations he was grappling with) and needed a co-author, she approached Elmer Rice, now acknowledged as the Broadway "boy wonder" of the moment. It was a smooth collaboration and resulted in a brief affair between Parker and the already-married Rice, begun at Rice's insistent urging. The run of the play did not go smoothly; however; despite good reviews, Close Harmony (1924) closed quickly and was forgotten.

Rice was a prolific, even tireless writer. His plays over the next five years included the unproduced The Sidewalks of New York (1925), Is He Guilty? (1927) and The Gay White Way (1928) and two collaborations, Wake Up, Jonathan (1928) with Hatcher Hughes, a dramatist unknown today and Cock Robin (1929) with Philip Barry, a Broadway name equal to Rice's. None of these plays were a success. Rice was a theatre professional by this time: open to collaboration, increasingly interested in producing and directing his own plays. In the 1930s, he even bought a Broadway house, the famed Belasco Theatre.

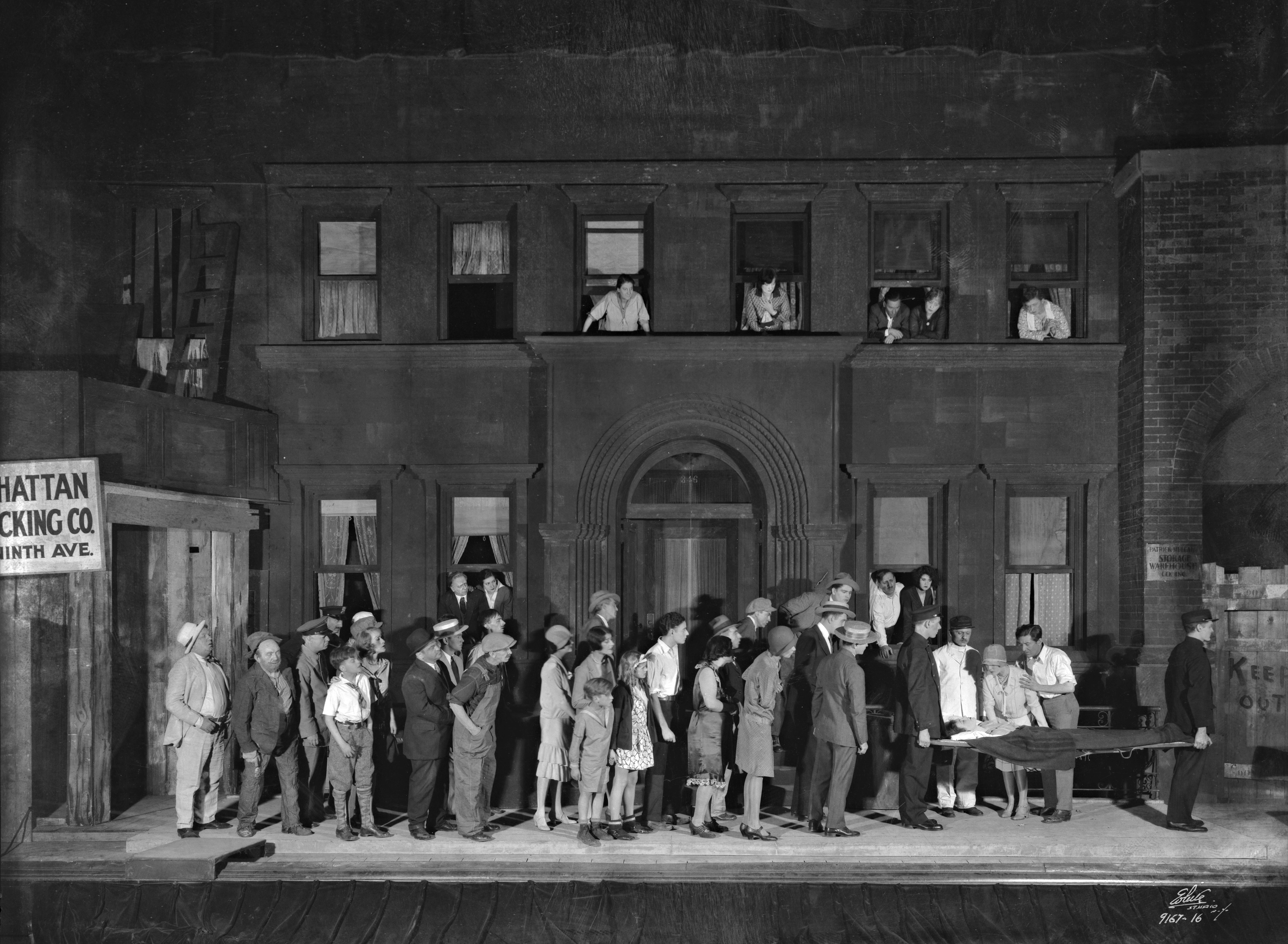
Original Broadway production of Street Scene (1929)

Rice's second hit (after The Adding Machine) proved to be his most lasting literary accomplishment. Originally entitled Landscape with Figures, Street Scene (1929), later the subject of an opera by Kurt Weill, won the Pulitzer Prize for Drama for its realistic chronicle of life in the slums. "With fifty characters casually strolling through it," Brooks Atkinson wrote, "it looked like an improvisation...Based on the facade of a house at 25 West 65th Street, which Rice selected as typical, the tall massive setting caught the tone and humanity of a decaying brownstone." The script had been rejected by most producers who read it, and director George Cukor abandoned it as un-stageable after the second day of rehearsals. Rice took over the direction himself and proved that it was highly stage worthy, if unconventional in its narrative style and disorienting naturalism. Like The Adding Machine, the play's break with the conventions of stage realism was part of its appeal.

Rice's plays of the 1930s included The Left Bank (1931), a comedy dramatizing an expatriate's superficial attempt to escape from American materialism in Paris, and Counsellor-at-Law (1931), a vigorous work that drew a realistic picture of the legal profession for which Rice had been trained. (The latter play is probably more frequently revived in regional theatres than any of Rice's other plays.) In that decade, he also wrote two novels and enjoyed a lucrative period in Hollywood, writing screenplays. His time in Hollywood was not without its friction, though, as he was looked upon by many studio heads as one of "those Eastern Reds."

The Depression-inspired, anti-capitalist We, the People (1933) was a play particularly close to Rice's heart. It dealt with "the misfortunes of a typical skilled workman and his family, helplessly engulfed in the tide of national adversity," as its author described it. Rice engaged an activist-minded cast and noted set designer Aline Bernstein to design the fifteen different sets that the ambitious play called for. We, the People failed amid what Rice called "agitated" reviews. A 1932 trip to the Soviet Union and to Germany, where he heard Hitler and Goebbels speak, provided material for Rice's next plays. The Reichstag fire trial is an element in Judgement Day (1934), and conflicting American and Soviet ideologies form the subject of the conversation-piece Between Two Worlds (1934).

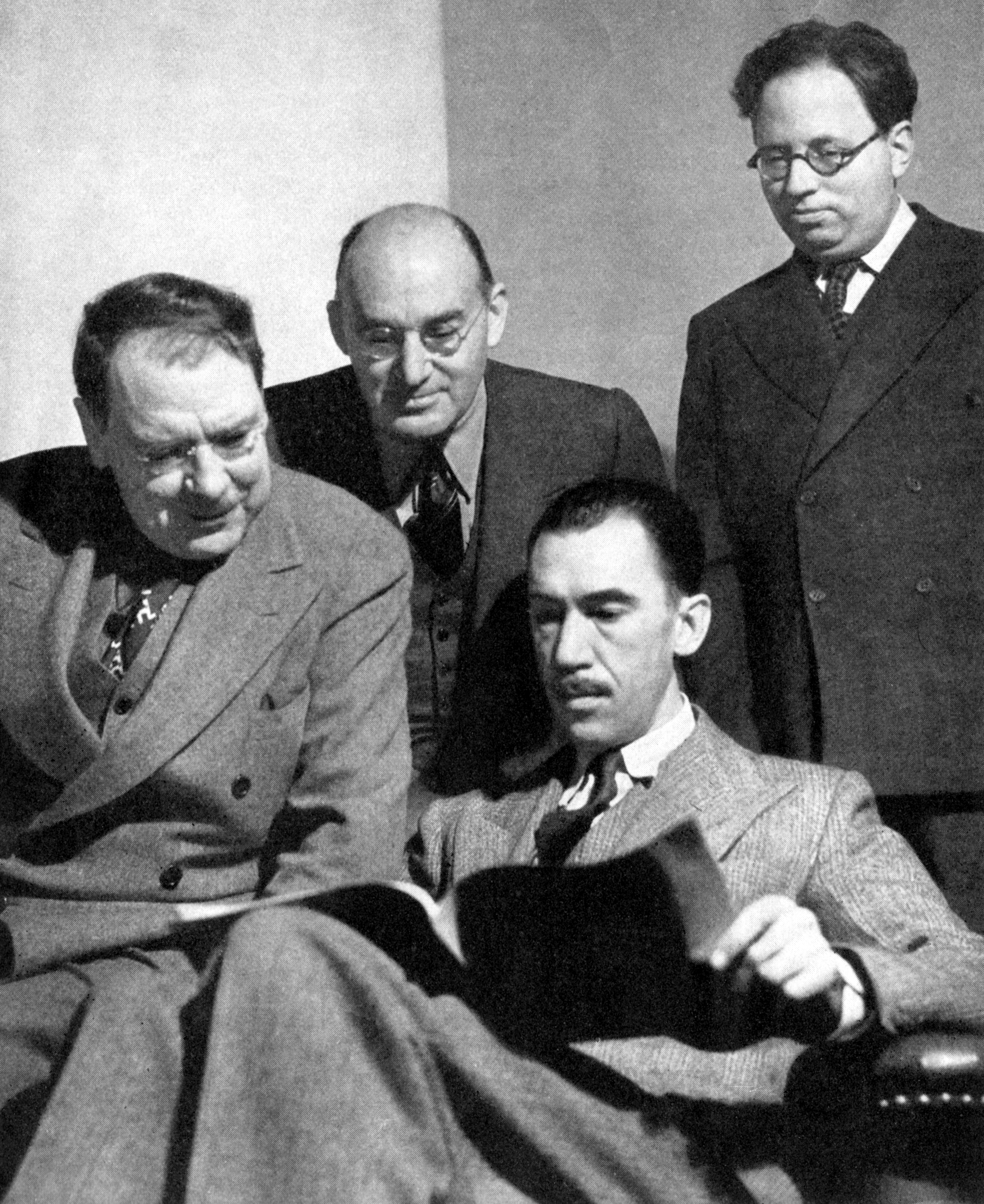
Maxwell Anderson, S.N. Behrman, Robert E. Sherwood, and Elmer Rice, four of the five founders of the Playwrights' Company (1938)

After the failure of these plays, Rice returned to Broadway in 1937 to write and direct for the Playwrights' Company, which he had helped to establish along with Maxwell Anderson, S. N. Behrman, Sidney Howard, and Robert E. Sherwood. Of his later plays, the most successful was the fantasy Dream Girl (1945) in which an over-imaginative girl encounters unexpected romance in reality. Rice's last play was Cue for Passion (1958), a modern psycho-analytical variation of the Hamlet theme in which Diana Wynyard played a Gertrude-like character. In his retirement, Rice was the author of a controversial book on American drama, The Living Theatre (1960), and of a richly detailed autobiography, Minority Report (1964).

Rice was one of the more politically outspoken dramatists of his time and took an active part in the American Civil Liberties Union, the Authors' League, the Dramatists Guild of America where he was elected as the eighth president in 1939, and P.E.N. He was the first director of the New York office of the Federal Theatre Project, but resigned in 1936 to protest government censorship of the Project's "Living Newspaper" dramatization of Mussolini's invasion of Ethiopia. An outspoken defender of free speech, he left that position with a "blast of scorn" at the Roosevelt administration's efforts to control artistic expression. (In 1932, Rice reluctantly supported the Communist Party candidate in the presidential election because he found Hoover and Roosevelt equally displeasing alternatives with an insufficient grasp of the crisis the country faced. though in subsequent elections he became an FDR supporter) He also spoke out against McCarthyism in the 1950s.

In the end, Elmer Rice did not believe he had been a success as a writer, not as he wished to define success. He needed to make a living and while deriding the commercialism of the New York stage, he earned a considerable amount of money, but at a cost to his more experimental vision. The realistic drama he could write with ease was at odds with the innovations that most intrigued him. The Adding Machine and Street Scene were anomalies and did not make money. An even more radical venture, The Sidewalks of New York of 1925, was an episodic play without words, "in which speech is indicated by gesture, by a series of situations in which there was no need for speech." The Theatre Guild turned the script down flat; Broadway would never be ready for the level of experimentation that inspired Rice, a reality that was a source of continuous frustration for him.

=== Personal life ===
Rice was married in 1915 to Hazel Levy and had two children with her: Margaret and Robert. After his divorce in 1942, he married actress Betty Field with whom he had three children: John Alden, Judy, and Paul. Field and Rice divorced in 1956.

Although born into a working-class family with no interest in the arts and known primarily for his attachment to theater and politics, Rice was passionate about the Old Masters and modern art. His art collection, slowly assembled over the years, included works by Picasso, Braque, Rouault, Leger, Derain, Klee, and Modigliani. He regularly frequented New York's museums, and in his autobiography, wrote of his first trip to Spain and the powerful impact Velazquez had on him and, in Mexico, of enjoying the work of Diego Rivera and the Mexican Muralists, artists who shared his political views. He was close friends with Japanese-American modernist painter Yasuo Kuniyoshi.

Elmer Rice lived for many years on a wooded estate in Stamford, Connecticut until his death in Southampton, England, in 1967 of pneumonia after suffering a heart attack. Obituaries noted a long and respected theater career. Brooks Atkinson described Rice in his history of Broadway as "a plain, rather sober man with a reticent, unyielding personality...But when a social principle was at stake, he was more clear-headed than most people, and he was quietly invincible...He was one of Broadway's most eminent citizens."

== Archive ==
Elmer Rice's papers were placed at the Harry Ransom Center at the University of Texas at Austin in 1968, a year after his death. Additions have been made by family members over the years. The collection spans over 100 boxes and includes contracts, correspondence, manuscript drafts, notebooks, photographs, royalty statements, scripts, theater programs, and over seventy-three scrapbooks. The Ransom Center's library division has over 900 books from Rice's personal library, many of which are inscribed to or annotated by Rice.

== Film portrayal ==
Rice was portrayed by the actor Jon Favreau in the 1994 film Mrs. Parker and the Vicious Circle.

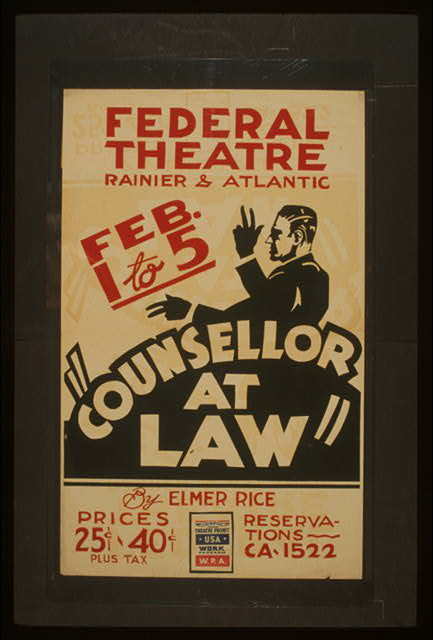
WPA poster, California, 1938

== Stage productions ==
- A Defection from Grace with Frank Harris (1913, unpublished)
- The Seventh Commandment with Frank Harris (1913, unpublished)
- The Passing of Chow-Chow (1913, one act, published in 1925)
- On Trial (1914) with Frank Harris
- The Iron Cross (1917)
- The Home of the Free (1918)
- For the Defense (1919)
- It Is the Law (1922)
- The Adding Machine (1923)
- The Mongrel (1924) from a novel by Hermann Bahr
- Close Harmony (with Dorothy Parker, 1924)
- The Sidewalks of New York (1925, unpublished in 1925, published in 1934 as Three Plays Without Words)
- Is He Guilty? (1927)
- Wake Up, Jonathan with Hatcher Hughes (1928)
- The Gay White Way (1928)
- Cock Robin with Philip Barry (1929)
- Street Scene (1929, also directed)
- The Subway (1929)
- See Naples and Die (1930, also directed)
- The Left Bank (1931, also produced and directed)
- Counsellor-at-Law (1931, also produced and directed)
- The House in Blind Alley: A Play in Three Acts (1932)
- We, the People (1933, also produced and directed)
- Three Plays Without Words (1934, one act)
  - Landscape with Figures
  - Rus in Urbe
  - Exterior
- The Home of the Free (1934, one act)
- Judgment Day (1934, also produced and directed)
- Two Plays (1935)
  - Between Two Worlds (also produced and directed)
  - Not for Children
- Black Sheep (1938, also produced and directed)
- American Landscape (1938, also directed)
- Two on an Island (1940, also directed)
- Flight to the West (1940, also directed)
- The Talley Method (1941, also produced and directed)
- A New Life (1944)
- Dream Girl (1946, also directed)
- The Grand Tour (1952, also directed)
- The Winner (1954, also directed)
- Cue for Passion (1959, also directed)
- Love Among the Ruins (1963)
- Court of Last Resort (1965)

== Novels ==
- On Trial (1915, a novelization of the play)
- Papa Looks for Something (unpublished, 1926)
- A Voyage to Purilia (1930), serialized in the New Yorker in 1929
- Imperial City (1937)
- The Show Must Go On (1949)

== Non-fiction ==
- "The Playwright as Director," Theatre Arts Monthly 13 (May 1929): pp. 355–360
- "Organized Charity Turns Censor," Nation 132 (June 10, 1931) pp. 628–630
- "The Joys of Pessimism," Forum 86 (July 1931) pp. 33–35
- "Sex in the Modern Theatre," Harper's 164 (May 1932) pp. 665–673
- "Theatre Alliance: A Cooperative Repertory Project," Theatre Arts Monthly 19 (June 1935) pp. 427–430
- "The Supreme Freedom" (1949) (pamphlet)
- "Conformity in the Arts" (1953) (pamphlet)
- "Entertainment in the Age of McCarthy," New Republic 176 (April 13, 1953) pp. 14–17
- The Living Theatre (1959)
- Minority Report (1964)
- "Author! Author!" American Heritage 16 (April 1965) pp 46–49, 84–86

== Selected filmography (play adaptations) ==
- 1917: On Trial
- 1922: For the Defense
- 1924: It Is the Law
- 1928: On Trial
- 1930: Oh Sailor Behave
- 1931: Street Scene
- 1933: Counsellor at Law
- 1939: On Trial
- 1948: Dream Girl
- 1969: The Adding Machine

== Other writing ==
- 1921: Doubling for Romeo (scenario)
- 1922: Rent Free (scenario)
- 1942: Holiday Inn (adaptation)

== Sources ==
- Atkinson, Brooks. Broadway. New York: Atheneum, 1970.
- Durham, Frank. Elmer Rice. Carbondale, IL: Southern Illinois University Press, 1970.
- Hogan, Robert. The Independence of Elmer Rice. New York: Twayne, 1965.
- Palmieri, Anthony. Elmer Rice: A Playwright's Vision of America. Madison, NJ: Farleigh Dickinson University Press, 1980.
- Rice, Elmer. Minority Report. New York: Simon and Schuster, 1963.
