= Neil Simon Theatre =

Broadway theater in Manhattan, New York

- Alvin Theatre (1927–1983)
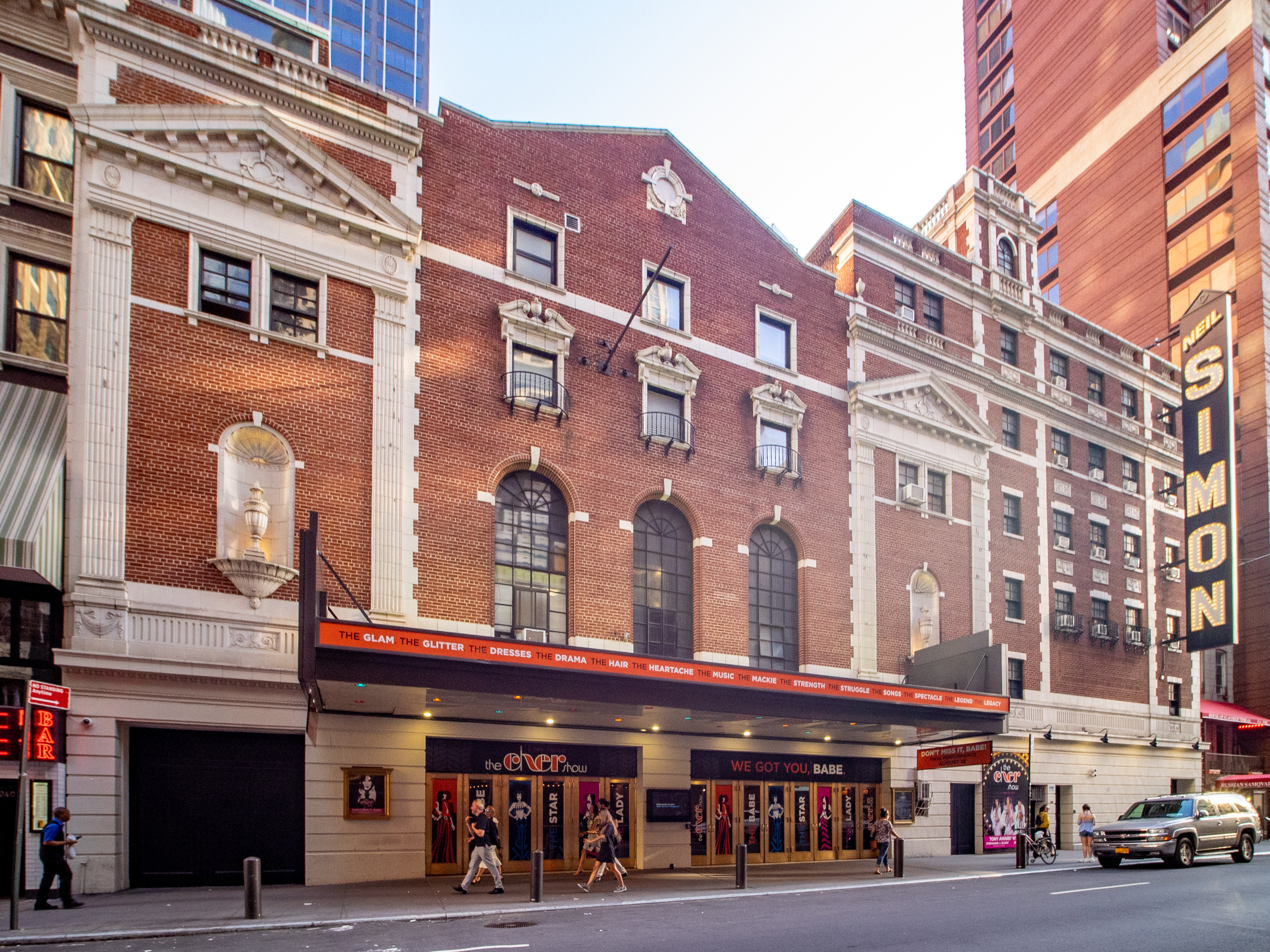
- Showing The Cher Show, 2019
- Interactive map of Neil Simon Theatre
- Address: 250 West 52nd Street; Manhattan, New York; United States
- Coordinates: 40°45′47″N 73°59′04″W
- Owner: Nederlander Organization
- Capacity: 1,467 (Note: This capacity is approximate and may vary depending on the show.)
- Type: Broadway
- Production: MJ the Musical

Construction
- Opened: November 22, 1927 (98 years ago)
- Years active: 1927–present
- Architect: Herbert J. Krapp

Website
- broadwaydirect.com/theatre/neil-simon-theatre/

New York City Landmark
- Designated: August 6, 1985
- Reference no.: 1305
- Designated entity: Facade

New York City Landmark
- Designated: August 6, 1985
- Reference no.: 1306
- Designated entity: Auditorium interior

The Neil Simon Theatre, originally the Alvin Theatre, is a Broadway theater at 250 West 52nd Street in the Theater District of Midtown Manhattan in New York City, New York, U.S. Opened in 1927, the theater was designed by Herbert J. Krapp and was built for Alex A. Aarons and Vinton Freedley. The original name was an amalgamation of Aarons's and Freedley's first names; the theater was renamed for playwright Neil Simon in 1983. The Neil Simon has 1,467 seats across two levels and is operated by the Nederlander Organization. Both the facade and the auditorium interior are New York City landmarks.

The facade is divided into two sections: the six-story stage house to the west and the five-story auditorium to the east. The ground floor is clad with terracotta blocks and contains an entrance with a marquee. The upper stories of both sections are made of brick and terracotta; the auditorium facade has arched windows, niches, and a central pediment, while the stage house has a more plain design. The interior is designed in the Adam style and includes two lobbies and a mezzanine-level lounge. The auditorium consists of a ground-level orchestra and one balcony with boxes. The theater interiors are decorated with paneling and plasterwork, and the auditorium has a domed ceiling. Above the auditorium were three stories of offices.

Alexander Pincus and M. L. Goldstone developed the Alvin Theatre, which opened on November 22, 1927, with Funny Face. Aarons and Freedley initially operated the theater and owned it from 1930 to 1932. In the theater's early years, it hosted musicals such as Anything Goes, Lady in the Dark, and Something for the Boys, as well as plays. CBS took over in 1946 and continued to operate the theater until 1959, when Max and Stanley Stahl bought it. The Alvin was further sold in 1967 to Rock-Time Inc. and in 1975 to the Nederlanders. Through the 1960s and 1970s, the Alvin hosted long runs of shows such as A Funny Thing Happened on the Way to the Forum, High Spirits, The Great White Hope, Company, Shenandoah, and Annie. After the theater was renamed for Neil Simon, it hosted several of his plays during the 1980s and 1990s, as well as the musical Hairspray during much of the 2000s.

== Site ==
The Neil Simon Theatre is on 250 West 52nd Street, on the south sidewalk between Eighth Avenue and Broadway, in the Midtown Manhattan neighborhood of New York City, New York, U.S. The rectangular land lot covers 12,350 ft^{2} (1,147 m^{2}), with a frontage of 123.50 ft (37.64 m) on 52nd Street and a depth of 100 ft (30 m). The Neil Simon shares the block with the Mark Hellinger Theatre and Gallagher's Steakhouse to the east. Other nearby buildings include the August Wilson Theatre to the north; the Broadway Theatre and 810 Seventh Avenue to the northeast; Axa Equitable Center to the east; the Winter Garden Theatre to the southeast; and Paramount Plaza (including Circle in the Square Theatre and the Gershwin Theatre) to the south.

== Design ==
The Neil Simon Theatre, originally the Alvin Theatre, was designed by Herbert J. Krapp and was constructed in 1927. The exterior is designed in the neo-Georgian style, while the interior is designed in the Adam style typical of most of Krapp's designs.

=== Facade ===
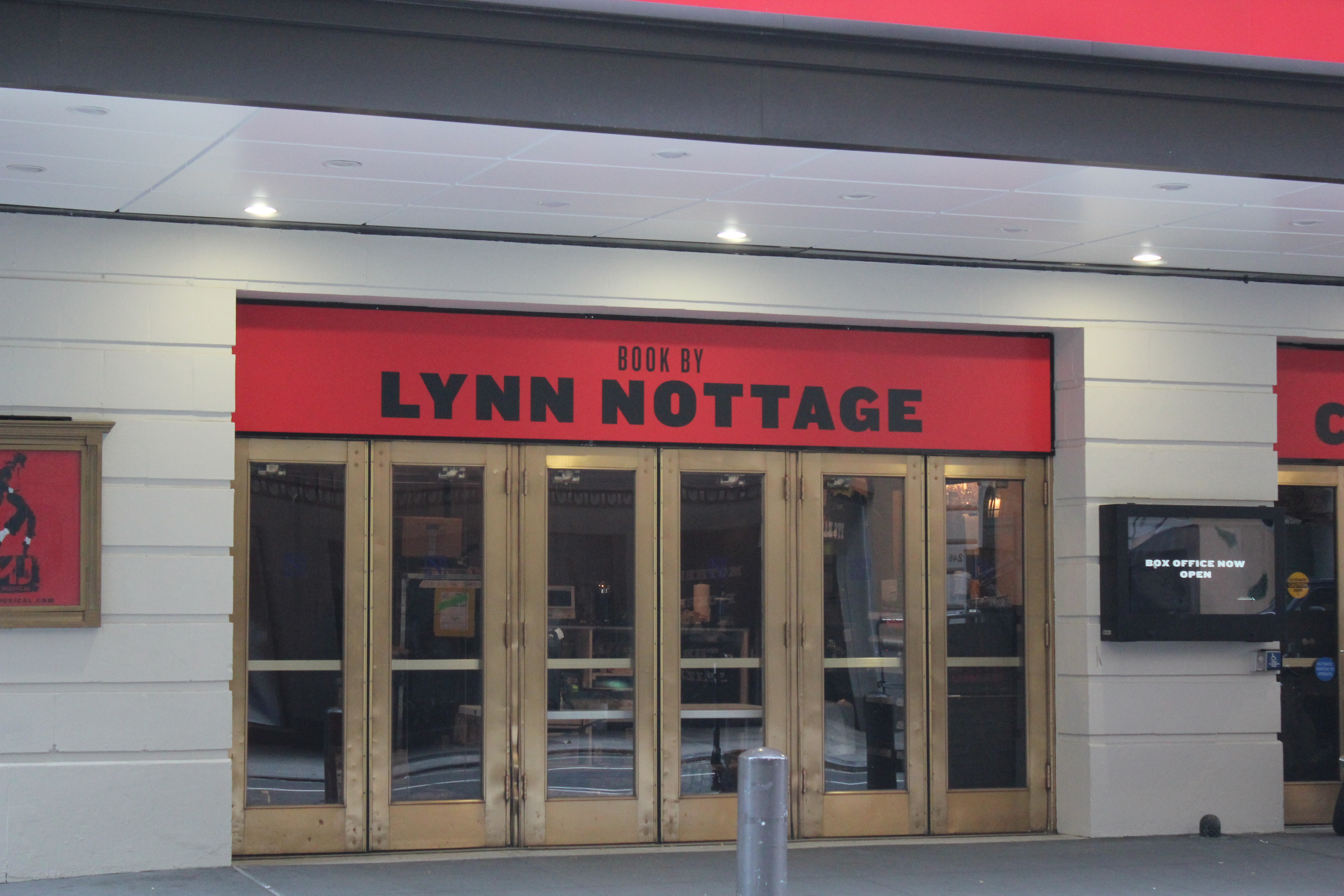
Main entrance doors

The facade consists of two sections, which are connected to each other. The five-story-tall eastern section is wider and is symmetrical, containing the auditorium entrance. The western section, which contains the stage house, is six stories high. On the upper stories, the facade is made of red brick in English bond, with terracotta trim. The Neil Simon is one of a few Broadway theaters with a neo-Georgian facade, along with the Belasco Theatre, Hayes Theater, and Stephen Sondheim Theatre. This was done to create the impression that theater-goers were "entering the producer's home". When the Alvin was built, one critic said the exterior design had "an appearance in keeping with the dignity of its neighbor" across the street, the Guild (now August Wilson) Theatre.

==== Base ====
In both sections, the base is made of rusticated blocks of terracotta, designed to resemble marble. On the eastern side of the ground-floor facade is a pair of recessed metal doors. The center of the auditorium facade contains two sets of metal-and-glass doors. Six doors to the east connect with the inner lobby, while eight doors to the west connect with the box office lobby; there is a modern marquee above these doors. In the stage-house section of the facade, there are several recessed doorways, including a stage door. A horizontal frieze with panels and vertical grooves runs above the base.

==== Upper stories ====
Upper stories (east to west)

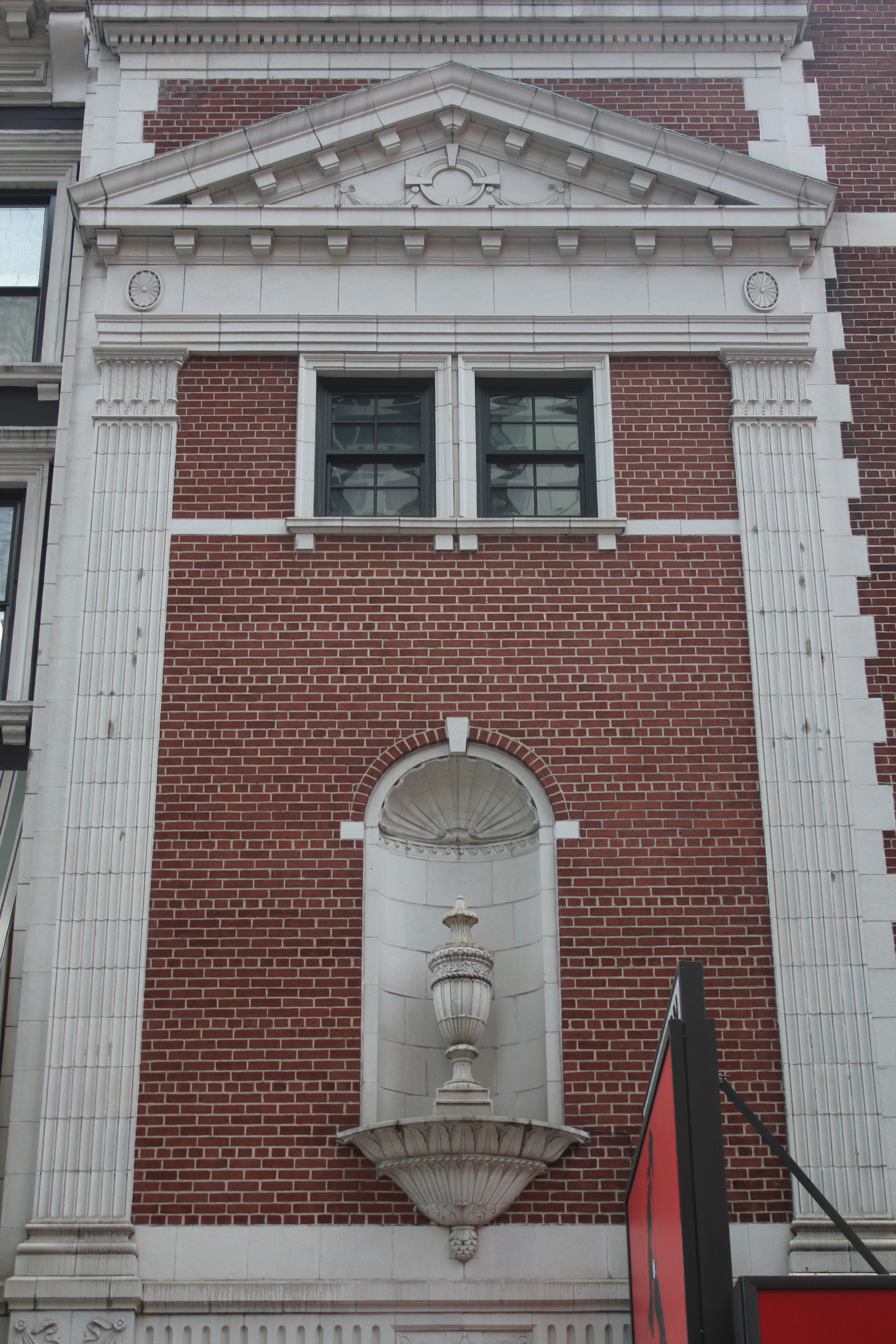
Eastern (left) pavilion of auditorium

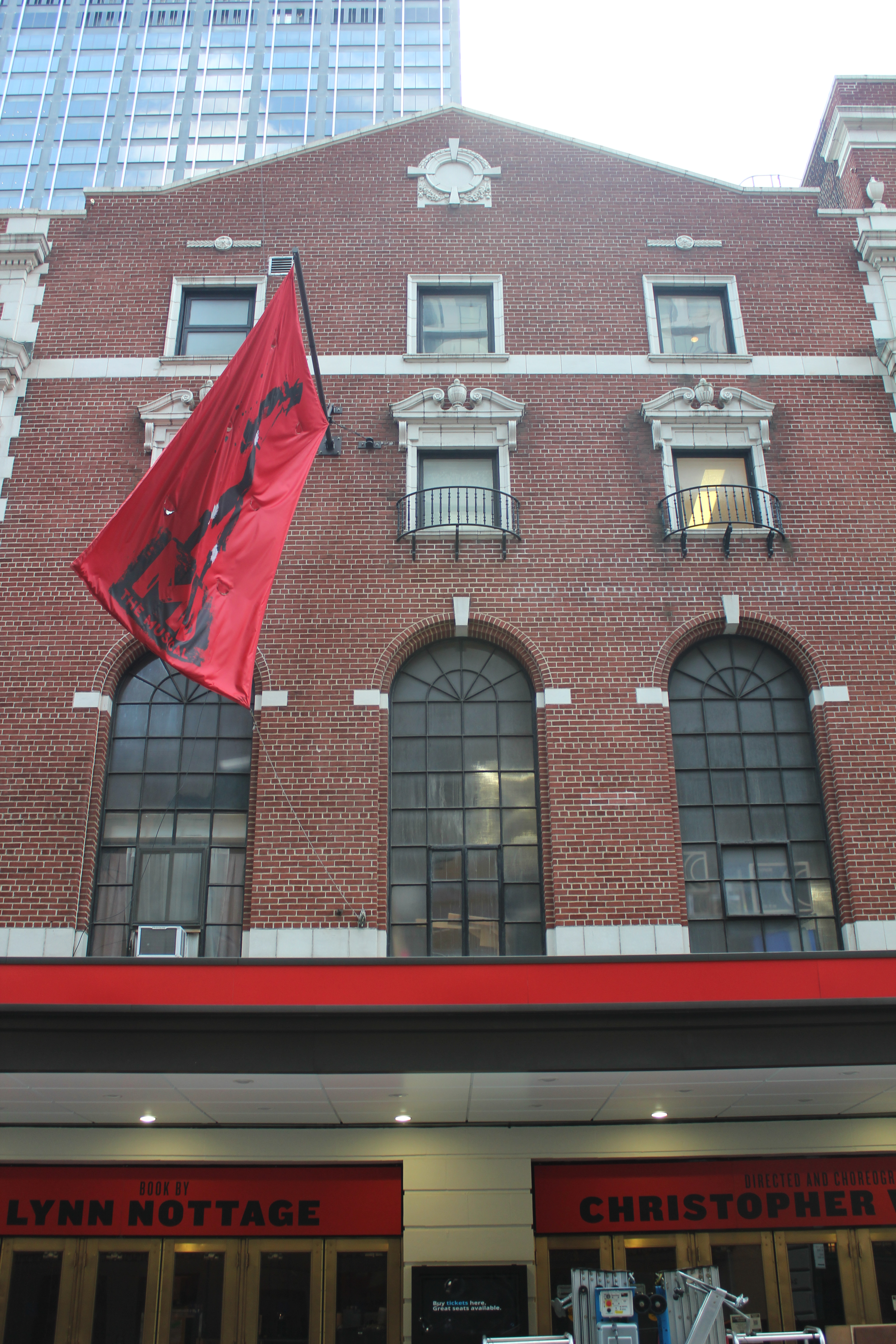
Central section of auditorium

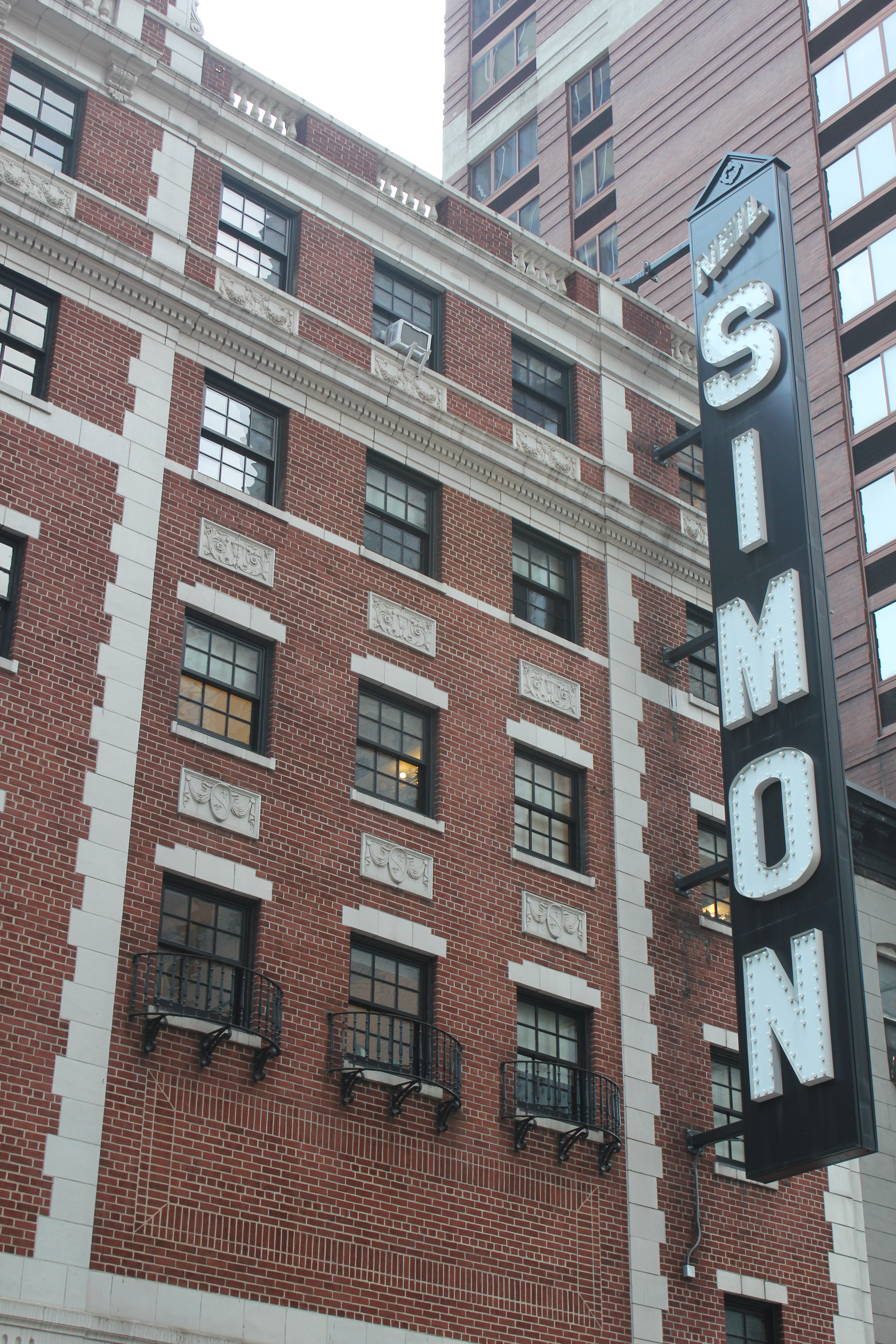
Stage house

Above the base, vertical terracotta bands and quoins divide the auditorium facade into three sections. The central section has three vertical bays of windows. Each bay contains a double-height arched window at the second story, with terracotta imposts and keystones near the top of each arch. On the fourth story, each of the three central bays has a rectangular window with a terracotta frame, above which is a broken pediment with scrolls flanking an urn. The fifth-story windows also have rectangular terracotta frames; their sills are connected by a terracotta band course. A triangular gable rises above these windows; there is a terracotta oculus at the center of the gable, surrounded by wreaths and floral decorations.

The outer sections of the auditorium facade are designed as pavilions, which are almost identical to each other except at the top. Both pavilions are flanked by fluted terracotta pilasters, which rest on the frieze that runs above the base. Between these pilasters are double-height niches at the second story, each surrounded by terracotta imposts and keystones. The niches contain terracotta urns, placed above seashell motifs. Above each niche, the fourth story contains two windows with rectangular terracotta frames. Each pair of pilasters supports a terracotta entablature and pediment on the fifth floor, as well as a cornice above that story. Whereas the eastern (left) pavilion is capped by a parapet, the western (right) pavilion rises for another story, the same height as the stage house.

The stage house is to the right of the auditorium. Vertical terracotta bands and quoins split the stage house into sections with one, three, and one bays from left to right. The windows of the stage house are rectangular, with terracotta lintels above each window. The center bays of the stage house also have terracotta panels above the third and fourth floors. There is a cornice and paneling above the fifth floor, as well as a parapet with a balustrade above the sixth floor. The leftmost bay of the stage house, nearest the auditorium, rises to a seventh story. The stage house's rightmost bay has a vertical sign with the theater's name.

=== Interior ===
==== Lobbies ====
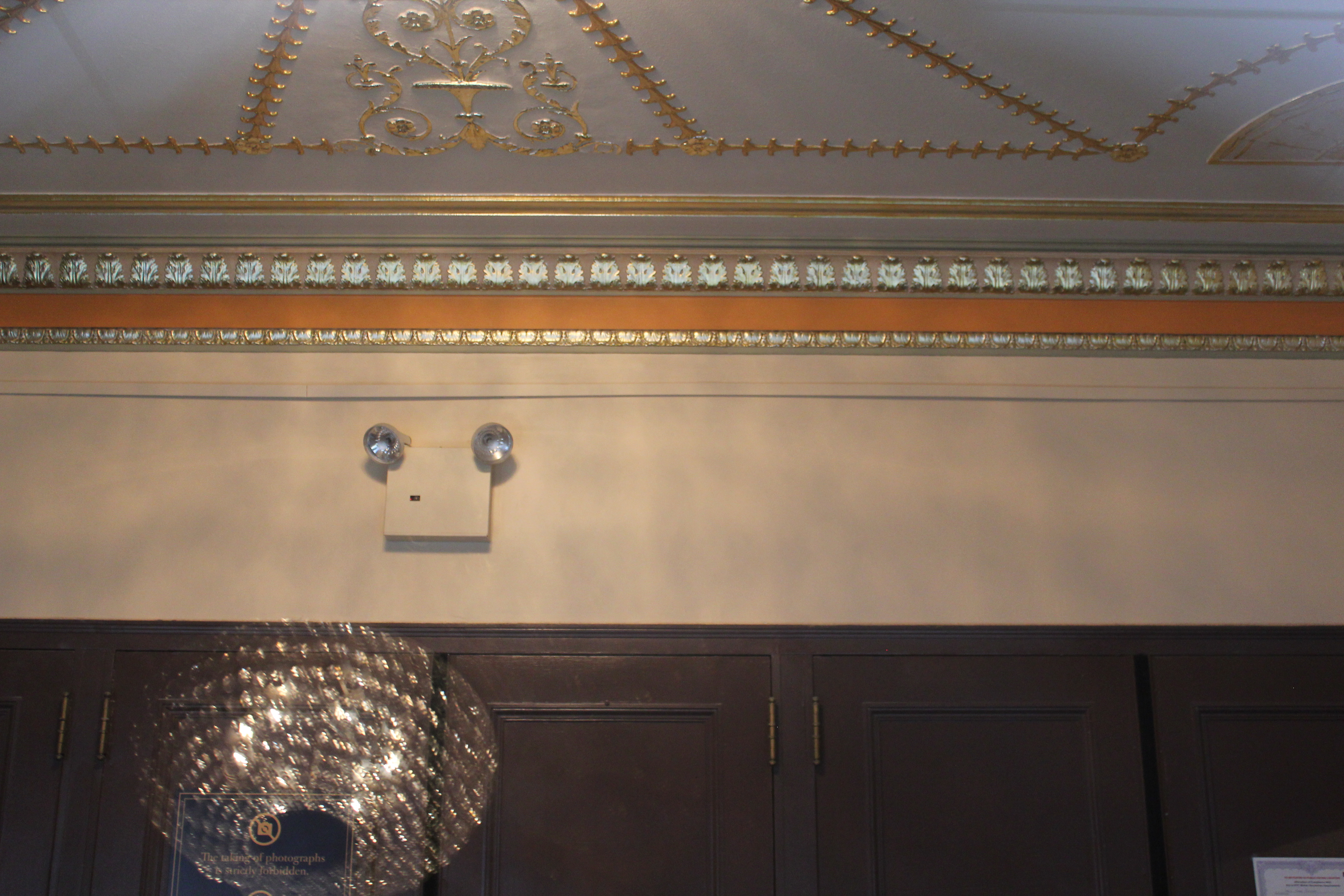
Decorative detail of the inner lobby

The rectangular ticket lobby is directly inside the main entrance and has dark marble walls. The western (right) wall has ticket windows, while the eastern (left) wall has a recessed niche to the inner lobby, containing a glass-and-bronze double door flanked by small sconces. The eight glass-and-bronze doors on the north wall lead from the street, with panels above them, while the south wall contains paneled wooden doors to the auditorium's orchestra level. A cornice surrounds the ceiling. which is decorated with plasterwork in the Adam style. The middle of the ceiling has a pair of crystal lamps.

The inner lobby is rectangular in plan. It is accessed by the niche on its western wall, which leads from the ticket lobby, as well as from the six glass-and-bronze doors on the north wall, which lead from the street. The south wall contains paneled wooden doors to the auditorium, while the east wall contains a staircase to the mezzanine lounge. The inner lobby's ceiling is decorated with plasterwork in the Adam style and contains a pair of crystal chandeliers.

When the Alvin was built, the mezzanine lounge was designed as an English lounge measuring 100 by 35 ft (30 by 11 m). The mezzanine lounge's walls are wainscoted and contain lighting sconces. The space also originally contained a fireplace. Four "retiring rooms" led off the lounge, which included men's and women's smoking rooms. The lounge's ceiling has an oval dome with plasterwork decorations; a central chandelier; and a cornice, which intersects with the dome. From the mezzanine lounge, staircases lead down to the north, connecting with the inner lobby, and south, connecting with the orchestra. There are rectangular coffers above either staircase, with crystal chandeliers and surrounding cornices. The southern staircase has a metal railing. These staircases were placed in the lounge, rather than within the auditorium itself, to minimize disruption from latecomers.

==== Auditorium ====
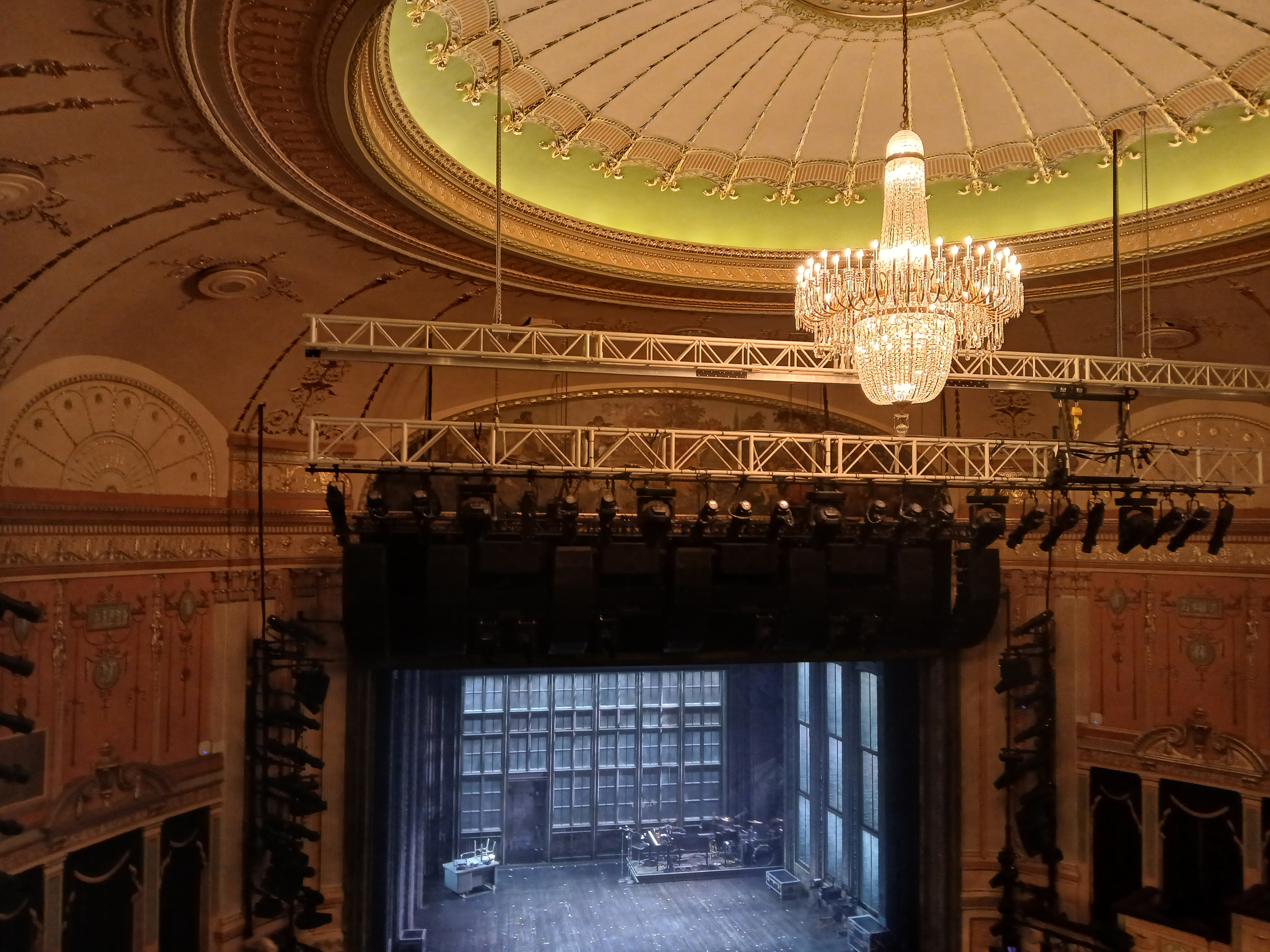
View of the proscenium from the balcony

The auditorium has an orchestra level, one balcony, boxes, and a stage behind the proscenium arch. The auditorium space is designed with plaster decorations and is nearly square in plan. According to the Nederlander Organization, the auditorium has 1,445 seats; meanwhile, The Broadway League cites a capacity of 1,467 seats and Playbill cites 1,380 seats. The theater originally had a capacity of 1,400 seats, with 702 in the orchestra, 674 in the balcony, and 24 in the boxes. An article from 1967 described the theater as having 1,363 seats for musicals and 1,334 seats for plays. The auditorium initially had a color scheme of ivory, blue, gray, and gold, with lavender or mulberry draperies. White paint covers many of the original interior decorations. The auditorium is topped by three stories of offices.

===== Seating areas =====
The orchestra level is raked, sloping down toward an orchestra pit in front of the stage. The rear of the orchestra contains a promenade with a paneled wall to the east, with sconces. The rear of the orchestra has a standing rail made of marble, separating the promenade from the rear rows of seats. The promenade and the orchestra seating are separated by two columns, designed to resemble marble pillars; they are topped by Doric-style capitals. The south (left) wall of the orchestra has metal doorways, alternating with paneled wall sections that contain sconces. The north (right) wall has two sets of paneled wooden doors, separated by a panel with a sconce; the doors in the rear lead to the inner lobby, while those in the front lead to the ticket lobby. The exit signs above each door are flanked by friezes that depict lyres and griffins.

The balcony level is divided into front and rear sections by an aisle halfway across its depth, which in turn is delineated by a metal railing. The crossover aisle connects to exit doors on both of the side walls, which in turn are topped by friezes with lyres and griffins. Exit doors with similar friezes are also placed on the side walls next to the front balcony. The rest of the balcony's side walls are divided into sections by pilasters with Ionic capitals, which support an entablature around the auditorium. Each side-wall section contains crystal-and-brass lighting sconces. The front rail of the balcony contains swags, urns, and cameo patterns, which have been partly covered over with light boxes. The underside of the balcony has Adam-style panels with crystal light fixtures. The balcony's rear wall is divided into panels that contain lighting sconces. There are some air-conditioning vents on the walls.

On either side of the stage is a wall section with three boxes at the balcony level. The boxes step downward toward the stage; the front box curves forward into the proscenium arch, while the rear box curves backward into the balcony. At the orchestra level, there is an opening on either wall, corresponding to the locations of the boxes above. The undersides of the boxes include crystal lamps and console brackets, while the front railings of the boxes contain swags, urns, and cameo patterns. Paneled piers separate the boxes from each other, supporting a smaller entablature directly above the boxes; each small entablature has a broken pediment with scrolls flanking an urn. Above the pediment, there are colonettes with female grotesques, which extend upward to the entablature that surrounds the auditorium.

===== Other design features =====
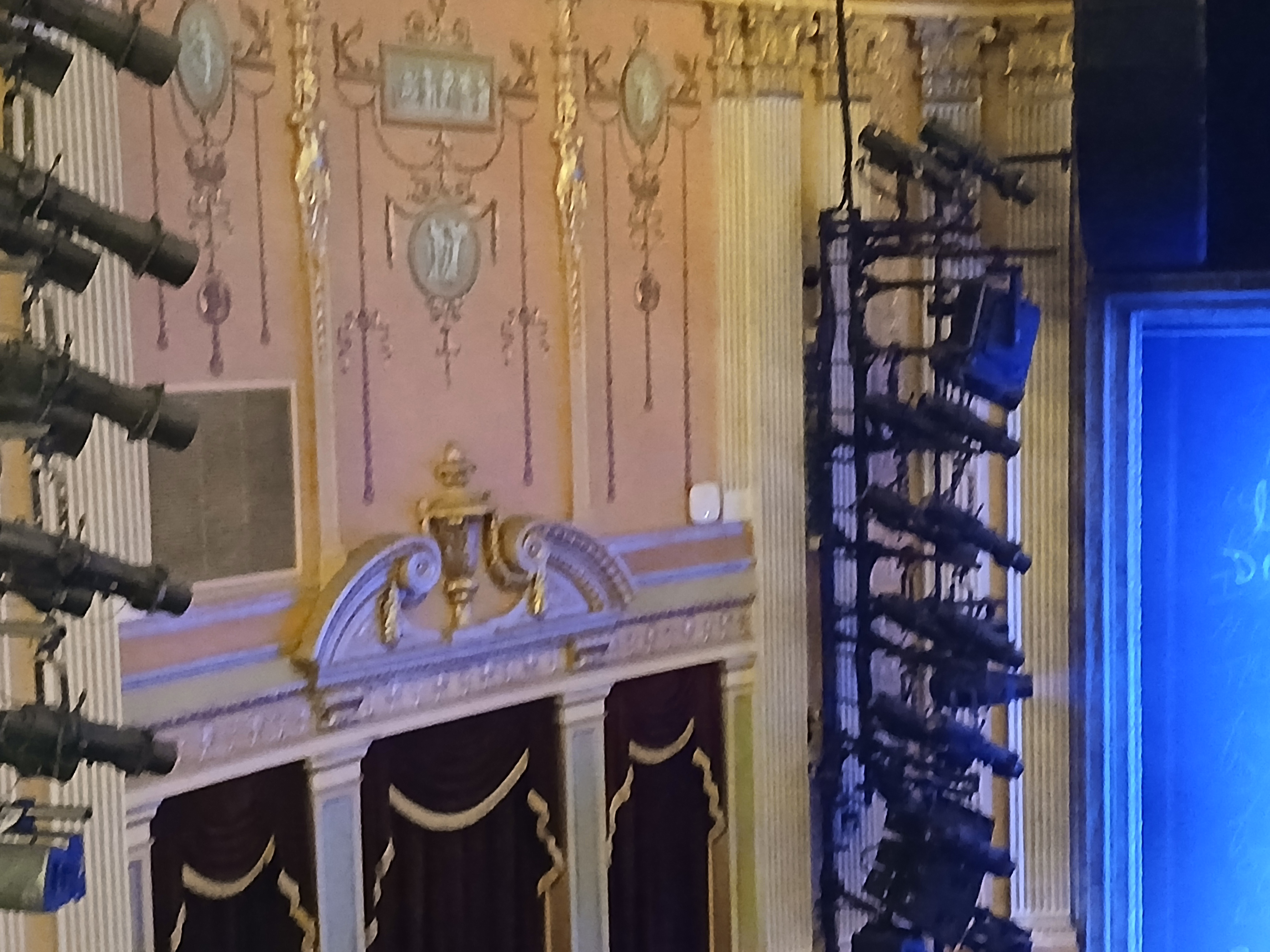
Detail of the wall above the left-hand boxes

Next to the boxes is a flat proscenium arch, which consists of fluted Ionic pilasters on either side of the opening, as well as an entablature above. The entablature contains an Adam-style frieze. Above the arch is a lunette panel with a mural, which shows a pastoral scene with mythological characters. When the theater was built, the proscenium opening was described as measuring 40 ft (12 m) wide. Behind the opening, the stage was 100 feet (30 m) wide and 35 feet (11 m) deep, with a gridiron 68 feet (21 m) tall. The orchestra pit in front of the stage could fit 48 people. Backstage were 20 dressing rooms capable of accommodating 150 performers, as well as a pair of chorus "rest rooms" and a rehearsal room.

The ceiling contains groin vaults on the side walls, separated by ribs with plasterwork decorations. At the front of the auditorium is a recessed circular dome encircled by ornamental bands, with a crystal chandelier hanging from a central medallion. Behind the dome, the ceiling is divided into panels with Adam-style plasterwork decorations. Above the rear balcony is a half-dome with ornamental bands and technical-booth openings. Air-conditioning vents are placed in the ceiling.

== History ==
Times Square became the epicenter for large-scale theater productions between 1900 and the Great Depression. The Alvin Theatre was one of the later theaters to be built before the Depression. The theater's name was an amalgamation of the first names of its original operators: Alex A. Aarons (1891–1943) and Vinton Freedley (1891–1969). Both men hailed from Philadelphia. Aarons was a producer of musical comedies, while Freedley was "the only Broadway producer whose name was listed in the social register". The men had formed a partnership in 1923 or 1924, but they only worked together until 1933. The theater is operated by the Nederlander Organization; since 1983, it has been named for Neil Simon (1927–2018), one of Broadway's most prolific playwrights.

=== Development and early years ===
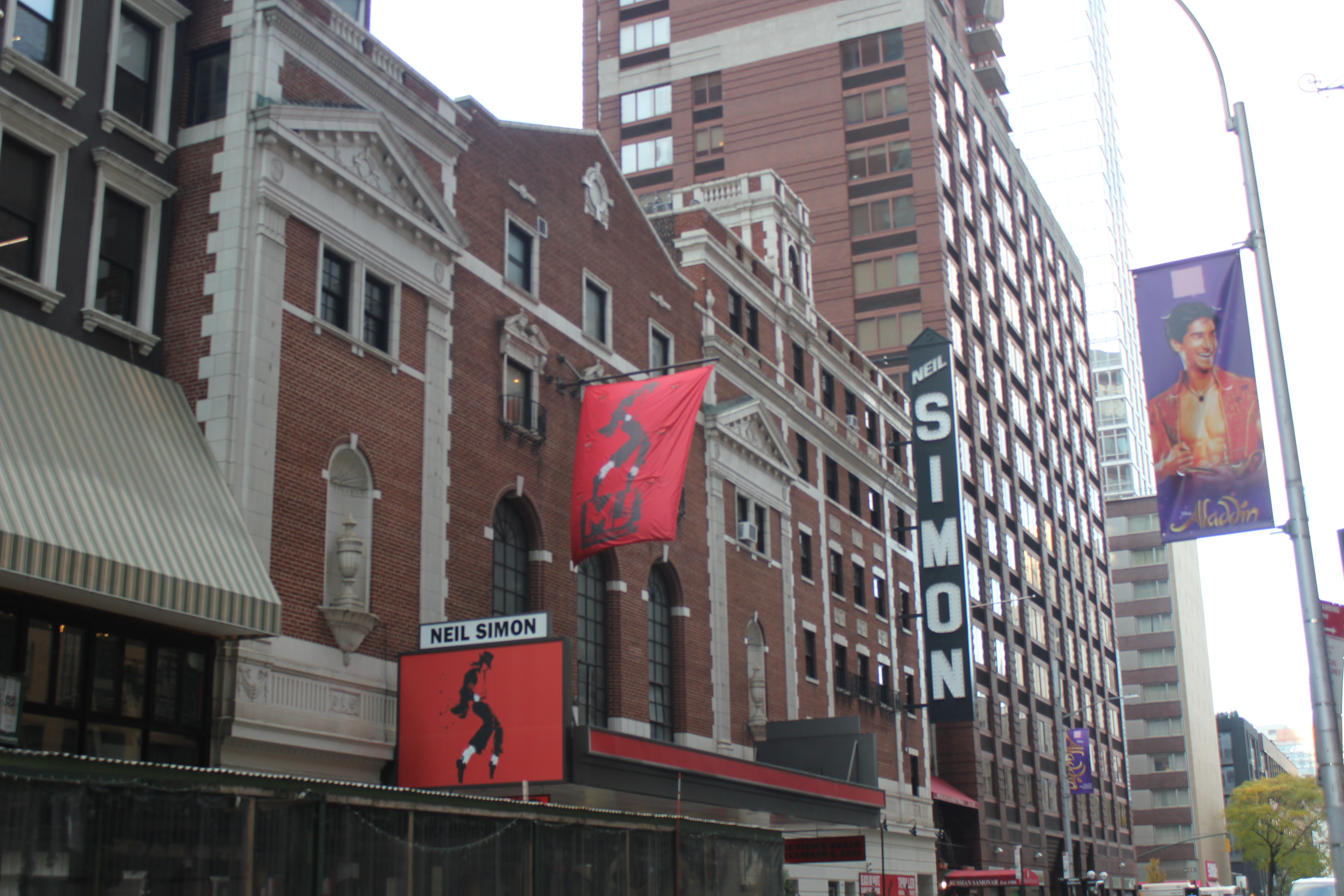
View from the west

In January 1927, Alexander Pincus and M. L. Goldstone bought the sites at 244–254 West 52nd Street from the Lebanon Estates Corporation, with plans to develop a legitimate theater on the site. Pincus had previously developed the Longacre and Imperial theaters; he and Goldstone planned to fund the theater's $1.4 million cost. The same month, Pincus submitted plans to the New York City Department of Buildings for a theater at the site, designed by Herbert J. Krapp. Pincus and Goldstone awarded a general contract for the theater's construction to the O'Day Construction Company that March. By October 1927, Aarons and Freedley had leased the theater and planned to stage George and Ira Gershwin's musical Funny Face, starring Fred and Adele Astaire. The Alvin opened on November 22, 1927, with Funny Face; that show ran for 250 performances. Brooks Atkinson, the theater critic for The New York Times, wrote: "If Funny Face had been less engrossing, the audience might have had more time to appreciate the new theatre."

The Alvin's first few musicals had relatively short runs. In 1928, the theater hosted the Gershwin musical Treasure Girl with Gertrude Lawrence. Though the musical charged a top admission of $6, then an unprecedented price, it managed 69 performances before it closed. Next was the Theatre Guild's production of Wings Over Europe, which relocated from the Martin Beck Theatre. Aarons and Freedley received a $570,000 mortgage loan on the theater in January 1929. The Rodgers and Hart musical Spring Is Here opened at the Alvin that March and had 104 performances. Another Rodgers and Hart musical, Heads Up!, opened at the Alvin that November for a 144-performance run. In 1930, Ethel Merman made her Broadway debut in the Gershwins' Girl Crazy, which had 272 performances. Aarons and Freedley bought the Alvin and the land underneath it that April.

=== Pincus and Goldstone operation ===
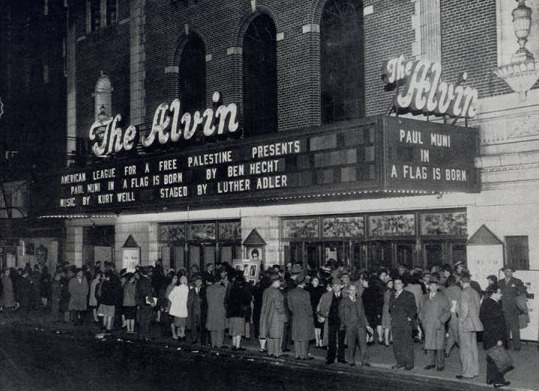
A Flag is Born at the Alvin in 1946

Pincus and Goldstone took over the Alvin's operations in May 1932 for unknown reasons. That year, the theater hosted a transfer of Eugene O'Neill's play Mourning Becomes Electra, as well as Jerome Kern's musical Music in the Air. The Players brought their production of Uncle Tom's Cabin to the Alvin in May 1933; the play was so popular that it was extended two weeks past its original one-week run. The same year saw the opening of the Maxwell Anderson play Mary of Scotland with Helen Hayes. Freedley next produced Cole Porter's musical Anything Goes at the Alvin in 1934, featuring Merman, William Gaxton, Victor Moore, and Vivian Vance; it ran for 420 performances.

By the mid-1930s, the Alvin Theatre and the neighboring Guild (now August Wilson) Theatre were the northernmost venues in the Theater District that still hosted legitimate shows. The original production of the Gershwins' American folk opera Porgy and Bess opened at the Alvin in October 1935. While Porgy and Bess closed at the Alvin after 124 performances, its revivals proved more successful. This was followed in October 1936 by Porter's Red, Hot and Blue with Merman and Jimmy Durante, which lasted 181 performances. The Alvin hosted two musicals by Rodgers and Hart in the late 1930s. I'd Rather Be Right opened with George M. Cohan in 1937, running for 289 performances, and The Boys from Syracuse opened in 1938, lasting 235 performances.

The Alvin's first production of the 1940s was a limited run of The Taming of the Shrew in February 1940, staged by acting couple Alfred Lunt and Lynn Fontanne for the Finnish Relief Fund. That April, Lunt and Fontanne appeared in Robert E. Sherwood's play There Shall Be No Night, which ran for several months with a tour in mid-1940. The next year, the Alvin hosted Ira Gershwin, Moss Hart, and Kurt Weill's psychiatry-themed musical Lady in the Dark; featuring Gertrude Lawrence, it had 467 performances. The Alvin hosted Porter's musical Something for the Boys with Ethel Merman in January 1943, appearing for 422 performances. Something for the Boys closed to make way for the musical Jackpot, which ran 67 performances. The Alvin's productions in 1944 and 1945 were mostly quick failures, including Helen Goes to Troy, The Firebrand of Florence, and Hollywood Pinafore. More successful was Betty Comden, Adolph Green, and Morton Gould's musical Billion Dollar Baby, which opened at the end of 1945 and lasted for 200 performances.

=== CBS ownership, Cullman operation ===
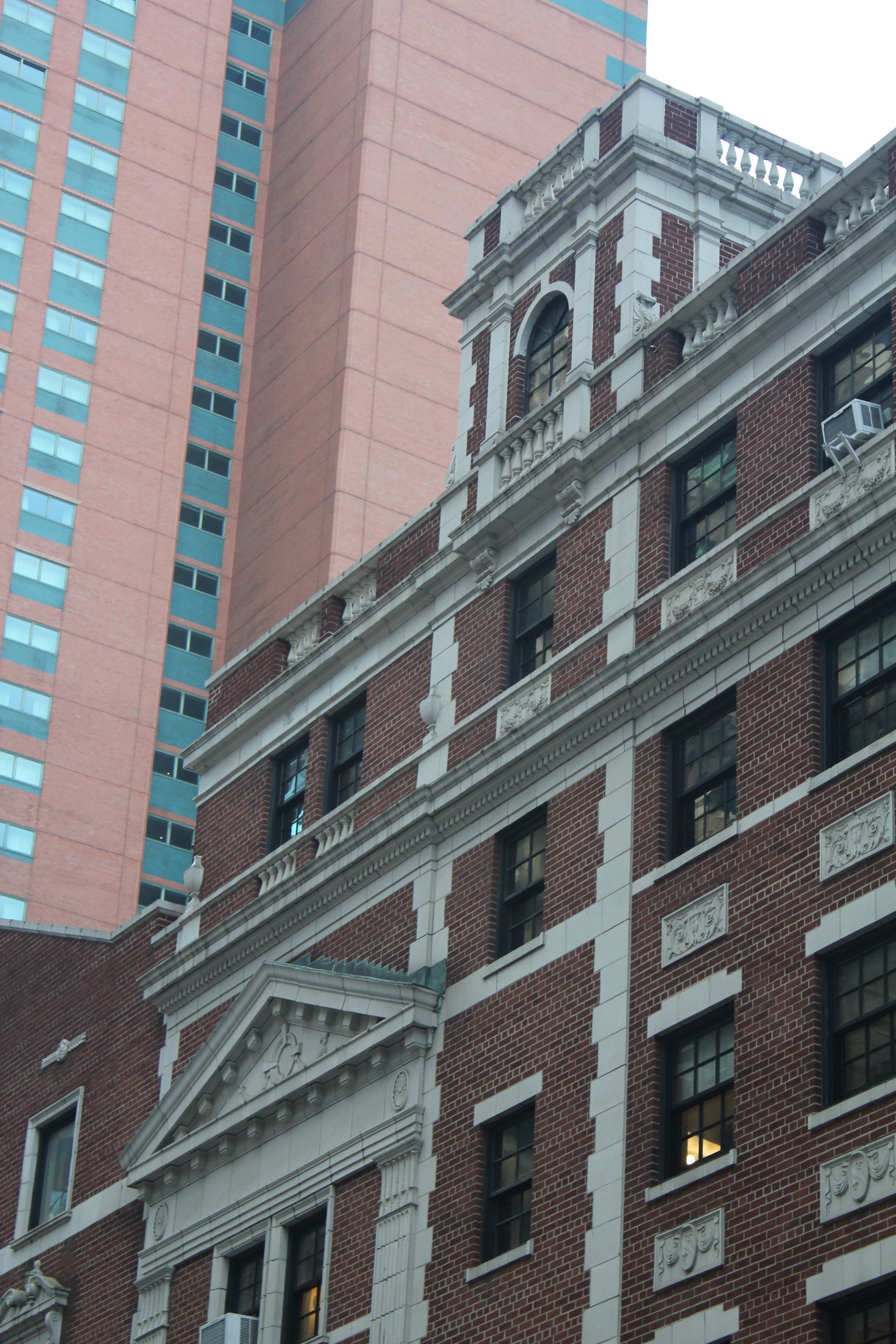
Attic

By December 1945, broadcast network CBS was negotiating to buy the Alvin for use as a studio, as CBS's lease at the nearby Hammerstein's Theatre was about to expire. Howard S. Cullman, who owned Hammerstein's, intended to return that theater to legitimate use. CBS bought the Alvin for $825,000 in February 1946. That June, CBS agreed to lease Hammerstein's from Cullman for five more years, while Cullman agreed to lease the Alvin from CBS and present productions there instead. The same year, the Alvin hosted Joan of Lorraine with Ingrid Bergman, Sam Wanamaker, and Romney Brent. This was followed in 1947 by the play Life with Father, which transferred from another theater to conclude its 3,224-performance run. George Bernard Shaw's play Man and Superman opened at the Alvin that October and relocated in February 1948. It was followed immediately afterward by Thomas Heggen and Joshua Logan's comedy Mister Roberts with Henry Fonda, which ran for 1,157 performances.

Cullman and CBS decided in 1951 to swap Hammerstein's and the Alvin for another three years, allowing the former to be used as a studio and the latter to be used for legitimate plays. Three shows opened at the Alvin that year: the Sidney Kingsley play Darkness at Noon, the musical A Tree Grows in Brooklyn, and the Paul Osborn play Point of No Return. Point of No Return was followed in December 1952 by the revue Two's Company, with Bette Davis in her first Broadway appearance in 22 years, but it only lasted about 90 performances. The next year, Norman Krasna's comedy Kind Sir opened at the Alvin with Mary Martin and Charles Boyer.

The musical The Golden Apple transferred to the Alvin from off-Broadway in April 1954, running for 173 total performances. The Harold Arlen and Truman Capote musical House of Flowers was booked before Cullman's lease came up for renewal that year, indicating that the leases of the Alvin and Hammerstein's would again be swapped. House of Flowers ultimately opened in December 1954 and ran for 165 performances. Ira Levin's comedy No Time for Sergeants opened the next year, running for 796 performances over two years. The theater hosted several moderately successful productions in the late 1950s, including the musicals Oh, Captain! in 1958 and First Impressions in 1959. In addition, Jerome Robbins choreographed his dance special Ballet U.S.A. in 1958, and the musical Bells Are Ringing relocated from the Shubert to the Alvin that year.

=== Stahl and Rock-Time ownership ===
CBS sold the Alvin in 1959 to Max and Stanley Stahl, who also owned the neighboring Hellinger Theatre. The Stahls quickly hired a new manager for the Alvin. In 1960, the theater hosted the musical Greenwillow, the dance troupe Les Ballets Africains, and a transfer of the musical West Side Story from the Winter Garden. The Carolyn Leigh and Cy Coleman musical Wildcat opened that December with Lucille Ball, who made her only Broadway appearance there. The musical Irma La Douce transferred from the Plymouth to the Alvin in 1961. The next year, Stephen Sondheim, Burt Shevelove, and Larry Gelbart's musical A Funny Thing Happened on the Way to the Forum opened, running for 967 performances. During A Funny Thing's run in October 1962, Lester Osterman (owner of the 46th Street and O'Neill theaters) leased the Alvin for five years.

Hugh Martin and Timothy Gray's musical comedy High Spirits, with Beatrice Lillie and Tammy Grimes, opened in 1964 and ran for 367 performances. Maurice Chevalier appeared at the Alvin in April 1965 for a month-long solo show, Maurice Chevalier at 77. This was followed the next month by Flora the Red Menace, in which Liza Minnelli made her Broadway debut. Flora the Red Menace and the next several shows had comparatively short runs. These shows included the musicals The Yearling (1965), It's a Bird... It's a Plane... It's Superman (1966), Dinner At Eight (1966), and Sherry! (1967). Rockefeller Center's development subsidiary Rock-Time Inc. bought the Alvin from Osterman in July 1967 through its agent, Konrad Matthaei. In exchange, Rock-Time sold the Playhouse Theatre near Rockefeller Center, which was to be demolished.

The Tom Stoppard play Rosencrantz and Guildenstern Are Dead opened at the Alvin in October 1967, running for 421 total performances across two theaters. It was succeeded in 1968 by Howard Sackler's drama The Great White Hope with James Earl Jones and Jane Alexander, which had 557 performances. The Alvin next hosted the original production of the Stephen Sondheim/George Furth musical Company, which premiered in 1970 and ran just over 700 performances during the next two years. A couple of short runs followed, including Molly (1973) and The Freedom of the City (1974). The Alvin's next success was the musical Shenandoah, which opened in 1975 and stayed two years before transferring. By July 1974, Matthaei had defaulted on the theater's mortgage loan, and the Bowery Savings Bank acquired the Alvin in foreclosure. The theater was then placed for sale at $1.2 million.

=== Nederlander ownership ===
==== 1970s and 1980s ====
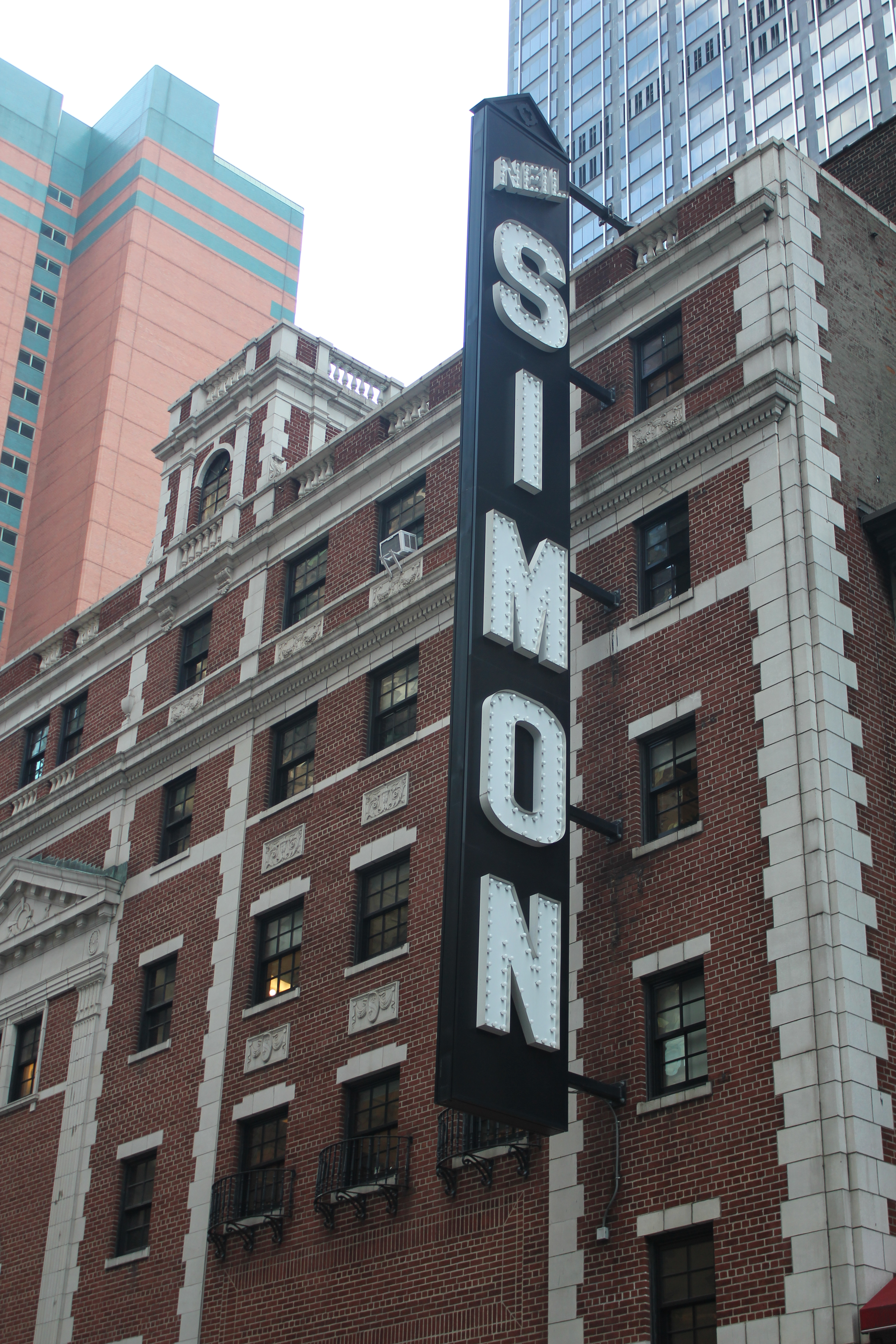
Vertical sign

The Nederlander Organization acquired the Alvin in 1975, and the venue became the family's fourth Broadway theater after the Palace, Uris, and Brooks Atkinson. The sale involved $100,000 in cash and a $1.16 million mortgage loan. The original Broadway production of Annie opened in 1977 and ran for five years before transferring. The next five musicals in 1981 and 1982 were short runs. The Little Prince and the Aviator closed during previews, while Merrily We Roll Along, Little Johnny Jones, Do Black Patent Leather Shoes Really Reflect Up?, and Seven Brides for Seven Brothers each closed after less than two weeks. The producers of The Little Prince, as well as those of Little Johnny Jones (which closed on opening night), successfully sued the Nederlanders in 1986, on the grounds that the company had unfairly evicted both shows. The Alvin's next non-flop was Your Arms Too Short to Box with God with Al Green and Patti LaBelle, which opened in September 1982.

Brighton Beach Memoirs, the first play in Neil Simon's Eugene trilogy, opened at the Alvin in March 1983. The Nederlanders renamed the theater for Simon shortly afterward on June 29, 1983. The renaming was unrelated to Brighton Beach Memoirs; the Nederlanders had offered to rename the theater after Simon in 1982, but the playwright had declined at the time. Members of the theatrical community expressed that the Alvin should have been renamed for the Gershwins; that name had been applied to the Uris Theatre. Jerry Weintraub then purchased a stake in the operation of the Neil Simon Theatre in 1984. Concurrently, the New York City Landmarks Preservation Commission (LPC) had started to consider protecting the Neil Simon as a landmark in 1982, with discussions continuing over the next several years. The LPC designated the facades of the Neil Simon, Ambassador, and Virginia (now August Wilson) theaters as landmarks in August 1985, (Note: The landmark designation for the Ambassador Theatre's facade was later revoked.) along with the Ambassador's and Neil Simon's interiors, over the objections of the three theaters' owners. The New York City Board of Estimate ratified the landmark designations in December 1985.

Brighton Beach Memoirs was followed by another play in the Eugene trilogy, Biloxi Blues, in 1985. The next year, the musical Into the Light opened at the Neil Simon, closing after six performances. Noël Coward's play Blithe Spirit opened at the Neil Simon in March 1987; the theater also hosted a tribute to one of the play's stars, Geraldine Page, who died mid-run. Comedian Mort Sahl made a limited appearance that October, and the play Breaking the Code opened the next month. The Neil Simon hosted revivals of two O'Neill plays in June 1988, Long Day's Journey into Night and Ah, Wilderness! (both with Colleen Dewhurst and Jason Robards), as part of the First New York International Festival of the Arts. Later that year, Kenny Loggins played some concerts at the Neil Simon. Two musicals were announced for the Neil Simon in early 1989; Senator Joe closed during previews, and The Tower of Babel did not even have previews. The Tennessee Williams play Orpheus Descending was then presented in September 1989. Around that time, the LPC had held a hearing on whether a hotel developed by Silverstein Properties could be cantilevered over the Neil Simon.

==== 1990s and 2000s ====
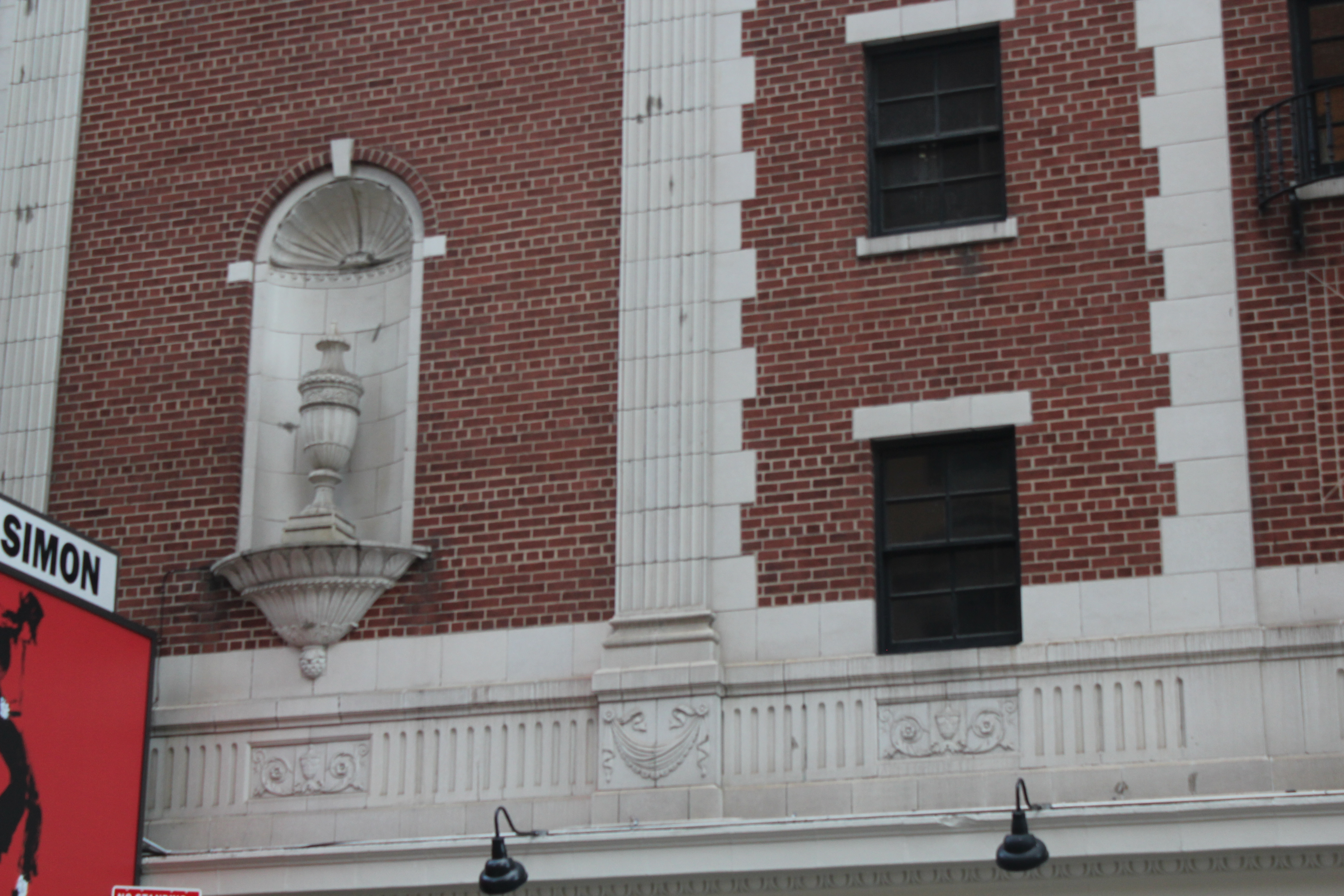
View of niche (left) and stage house (right)

A dance troupe of Don Cossacks from Russia had a limited engagement at the Neil Simon in January 1990, That October, comedian Jackie Mason launched his solo series Brand New, which ran for eight months. Another Simon play opened at his namesake theater in March 1992, Jake's Women, which had 245 performances amid mixed reception. The next November, the Dutch production Cyrano: The Musical opened at the Neil Simon, lasting 137 performances. The hit West End musical The Rise and Fall of Little Voice opened at the Neil Simon in May 1994, only to close after one week. This was followed by concerts from musicians Basia in November 1994 and Laurie Anderson in May 1995, as well as a limited performance by Danny Gans in November 1995. The Rodgers and Hammerstein musical The King and I was revived in 1996. The King and I closed in early 1998 to make way for the Arthur Miller play A View from the Bridge, which lasted through August 1998. The Neil Simon hosted the dance special Swan Lake in late 1998, as well as a concert by Natalie Merchant and a revised version of the musical The Scarlet Pimpernel in 1999.

A revival of the musical The Music Man opened at the Neil Simon in early 2000, lasting until the end of 2001. During The Music Man's run, the comedian Mandy Patinkin launched a U.S. tour on September 10, 2001, with a concert at the Neil Simon. Elaine Stritch's one-woman show Elaine Stritch at Liberty then premiered at the Neil Simon in February 2002. After the closure of Elaine Stritch at Liberty, the Neil Simon was expanded from 1,328 seats to a potential 1,467 in preparation for its next engagement: the musical Hairspray, which opened in August 2002. Hairspray set the house record for the theater, closing at the beginning of 2009. Robin Williams was to perform his comedy tour Weapons Of Self-Destruction at the Neil Simon in April 2009, but he canceled his engagement after undergoing surgery. A revival of Ragtime was booked instead, opening in November 2009. Ragtime failed to repeat the success it had enjoyed at the Kennedy Center in Washington, D.C., closing in January 2010 after 57 performances.

==== 2010s to present ====
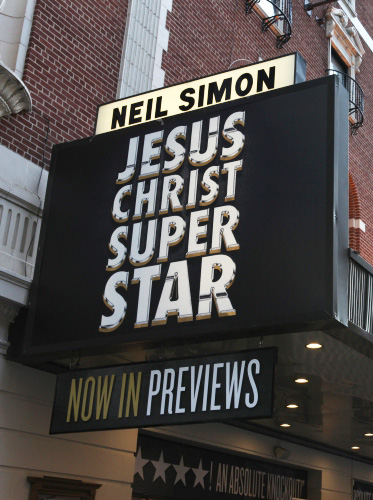
Marquee for the revival of Jesus Christ Superstar (2012)

Musician Harry Connick Jr. had a limited performance at the Neil Simon in July 2010; his appearance was recorded for the 2011 album In Concert on Broadway. The concert Rain: A Tribute to the Beatles opened at the Neil Simon that October, relocating to the Brooks Atkinson at the beginning of 2011. The musical Catch Me if You Can opened in April 2011, running for 170 performances. A revival of Jesus Christ Superstar ran at the Neil Simon from March to July 2012, followed at the end of that year by the short-lived musical Scandalous. The Andrew Lippa musical Big Fish was then booked for the Neil Simon in early 2013, but the theater stood dark for most of that year because Big Fish was performing elsewhere. Big Fish only ran from October to December 2013. This was followed by two similarly short runs: Robert Schenkkan's play All the Way from March to June 2014, and Sting's musical The Last Ship from October 2014 to January 2015.

A revival of Frederick Loewe and Alan Jay Lerner's musical Gigi opened at the Neil Simon in April 2015, only for the show to close after two months. In July 2015, the Nederlanders sold 20,000 ft^{2} (1,900 m^{2}) of the unused air rights above the Neil Simon for $8.9 million. The buyers were a development consortium erecting a hotel several blocks away. (Note: New York City zoning sets a maximum floor area for each land lot, after which developers must buy air rights to increase their floor area. Typically, building owners could only sell air rights to developers who owned adjacent sites. Broadway theater owners are allowed to sell their air rights to developers of any lot between Sixth and Eighth Avenues north of 40th Street, regardless of whether the land lots were contiguous.) At the end of that year, The Illusionists performed a magic show at the Neil Simon for a limited run. A revival of Andrew Lloyd Webber's hit musical Cats opened at the Neil Simon in August 2016 and ran until the end of the next year. Tony Kushner's play Angels in America then opened in March 2018 for a three-month run. The musical The Cher Show opened that December and ran until August 2019, and The Illusionists returned in late 2019 for their magic show, Magic of the Holidays.

After The Cher Show closed, MJ the Musical had been booked at the Neil Simon for mid-2020. The theater did not host another show for two years due to the COVID-19 pandemic in New York City. It reopened in December 2021 with previews of MJ the Musical, which officially opened in February 2022. MJ broke the theater's box-office record ten times in 2022 and set the current record during the week ending January 1, 2023, when the musical grossed $2,223,069.

== Notable productions ==
Productions are listed by the year of their first performance.

=== Alvin Theatre ===
Notable productions at the theater
Opening year	Name	Refs.
1927	Funny Face	
1928	Treasure Girl	
1929	Spring Is Here	
1930	Girl Crazy	
1932	Mourning Becomes Electra	
1932	Music in the Air	
1933	Uncle Tom's Cabin	
1933	Mary of Scotland	
1934	Anything Goes	
1935	Porgy and Bess	
1936	Red, Hot and Blue	
1937	I'd Rather Be Right	
1938	The Boys from Syracuse	
1939	George White's Scandals	
1939	Very Warm for May	
1940	The Taming of the Shrew	
1940	There Shall Be No Night	
1941	Lady in the Dark	
1942	Angna Enters	
1943	Something for the Boys	
1944	Jackpot	
1944	The Maid as Mistress/The Secret of Suzanne	
1944	Sadie Thompson	
1945	The Tempest	
1945	The Firebrand of Florence	
1945	Hollywood Pinafore	
1945	Billion Dollar Baby	
1946	A Flag Is Born	
1946	Joan of Lorraine	
1946	Cyrano de Bergerac	
1947	Life with Father	
1947	Man and Superman	
1948	Mister Roberts	
1951	Darkness at Noon	
1951	A Tree Grows in Brooklyn	
1951	Point of No Return	
1952	Two's Company	
1953	Kind Sir	
1954	The Golden Apple	
1954	House of Flowers	
1955	No Time for Sergeants	
1957	Rumple	
1958	Oh, Captain!	
1958	Jerome Robbins' Ballet: U.S.A.	
1958	Bells Are Ringing	
1959	First Impressions	
1959	Once Upon a Mattress	
1960	Greenwillow	
1960	Les Ballets Africains	
1960	West Side Story	
1960	Wildcat	
1961	Irma La Douce	
1962	A Funny Thing Happened on the Way to the Forum	
1964	High Spirits	
1965	Maurice Chevalier at 77	
1965	Flora the Red Menace	
1965	The Yearling	
1966	It's a Bird... It's a Plane... It's Superman	
1966	Dinner At Eight	
1967	Sherry!	
1967	Rosencrantz and Guildenstern Are Dead	
1968	The Education of H*Y*M*A*N K*A*P*L*A*N	
1968	The Great White Hope	
1970	Company	
1973	Molly	
1974	The Freedom of the City	
1975	Shenandoah	
1977	Annie	
1981	Merrily We Roll Along	
1982	The Little Prince and the Aviator	(Note: The Little Prince and the Aviator never officially opened at the Alvin Theatre; it only played previews.)
1982	Little Johnny Jones	
1982	Do Black Patent Leather Shoes Really Reflect Up?	
1982	Seven Brides for Seven Brothers	
1982	Your Arms Too Short to Box with God	
1983	Brighton Beach Memoirs	

=== Neil Simon Theatre ===
Notable productions at the theater
Opening year	Name	Refs.
1985	Biloxi Blues	
1986	Into the Light	
1987	Blithe Spirit	
1987	Mort Sahl on Broadway!	
1987	Breaking the Code	
1988	Long Day's Journey into Night	
1988	Ah, Wilderness!	
1988	Kenny Loggins on Broadway	
1989	Orpheus Descending	
1990	Jackie Mason: Brand New	
1992	Jake's Women	
1993	Cyrano: The Musical	
1994	The Rise and Fall of Little Voice	
1994	Basia on Broadway	
1995	Laurie Anderson on Broadway: The Nerve Bible	
1995	Danny Gans on Broadway: The Man of Many Voices	
1996	The King and I	
1998	A View from the Bridge	
1998	Swan Lake	
1999	Natalie Merchant	
1999	The Scarlet Pimpernel	
2000	The Music Man	
2002	Elaine Stritch at Liberty	
2002	Hairspray	
2009	Ragtime	
2010	Harry Connick Jr.: In Concert on Broadway	
2010	Rain: A Tribute to the Beatles	
2011	Catch Me If You Can	
2012	Jesus Christ Superstar	
2012	Scandalous	
2013	Big Fish	
2014	All the Way	
2014	The Last Ship	
2015	Gigi	
2015	The Illusionists: Live on Broadway	
2016	Cats	
2018	Angels in America	
2018	The Cher Show	
2019	The Illusionists: Magic of the Holidays	
2022	MJ the Musical	

== See also ==
- List of Broadway theaters
- List of New York City Designated Landmarks in Manhattan from 14th to 59th Streets
