= Indiscreet (1958 film) =

British romantic comedy by Stanley Donen

- Theatrical release poster
- Directed by: Stanley Donen
- Screenplay by: Norman Krasna
- Based on: Kind Sir by Norman Krasna
- Produced by: Stanley Donen
- Starring: Cary Grant; Ingrid Bergman
- Cinematography: Freddie Young
- Edited by: Jack Harris
- Music by: Richard Bennett; Ken Jones
- Production company: Grandon Productions
- Distributed by: Warner Bros. Pictures
- Release date: 26 June 1958
- Running time: 100 minutes
- Country: United Kingdom
- Language: English
- Box office: $8 million (US)

Indiscreet is a 1958 British romantic comedy film produced and directed by Stanley Donen, and starring Ingrid Bergman and Cary Grant.

The film is based on the 1954 play Kind Sir by Norman Krasna. This was Bergman and Grant's second film appearance together, the other being Alfred Hitchcock's Notorious (1946). It was one of the first films to popularize the artistic use of split screen. The film was remade for television in 1988 starring Robert Wagner and Lesley-Anne Down.

== Plot ==
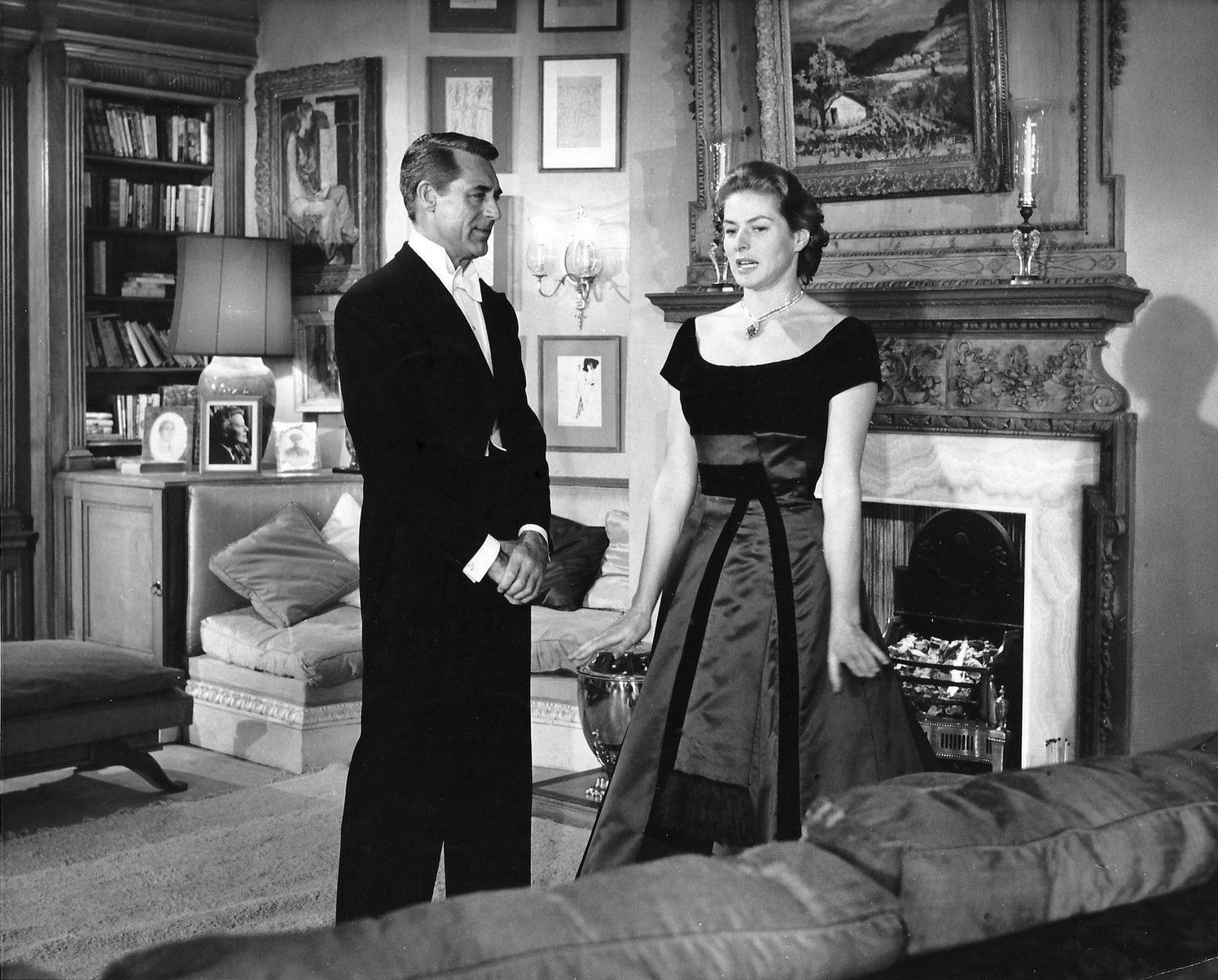
Cary Grant and Ingrid Bergman in the romantic comedy film Indiscreet.

Famous London-based theater actress Anna Kalman is bored with her latest romantic infatuation and has returned home early from a trip to Mallorca. Her sister, Margaret, and brother-in-law, Alfred Munson, arrive at Anna's apartment with Philip Adams, a handsome American economist who is being courted by Alfred to accept a NATO position in Paris. Rather than let Anna spend the evening alone, they urge her to attend the dinner lecture that Phillip is to give on economics. Initially unenthusiastic about sitting through a financial lecture, Anna is attracted by Philip's wry good-natured humor about boring speeches and agrees to accompany them.

At the end of the evening, when Anna invites Philip to the ballet, Philip informs her that he is married and does not want to accept her invitation under false pretense. He adds that he is separated and unable to get a divorce. Hesitant, Anna at first lets him take his leave, but calls him back and repeats the invitation, which Philip accepts gladly.

Anna and Philip hit it off on their first date and Philip accepts the position at NATO in Paris to be able to come to London frequently to be with Anna. As their romance blossoms, Philip receives a temporary transfer to New York for his work at NATO, which distresses Anna greatly as it will keep them apart for as much as five months.

On the day before Philip is scheduled to sail with the NATO team, Alfred reveals privately to Philip that he knows Philip is a bachelor and asks him why he told Margaret he is married. Philip responds that he has no intention of ever marrying, but women take such a declaration as a challenge; inevitably they feel cheated when the relationship does not lead to marriage. He contends that the "honorable" approach is to tell women that he is already married and cannot divorce; they can have no illusions when they subsequently grant him favors. Alfred is unsure of Philip's "honorable" approach but will keep his secret out of fellowship. Philip assures Alfred that he sincerely loves Anna and delights in pleasing her. He confides that he plans to delay his departure after the NATO team sets sail so he can surprise Anna at the stroke of midnight on her birthday, spend a few extra days with her, and later fly to join the team in New York.

When Anna tells Alfred and Margaret that she does not want to spend five months without Philip and plans to leave her play and fly to New York to surprise him, Alfred reluctantly discloses Philip's plan to surprise Anna on her birthday and spend a few extra days with her. Margaret then reveals that she has learned that Philip is unmarried by peeking at a Scotland Yard security report on Alfred's desk. Anna is furious upon learning this, but secretly forms a plan to get even with Philip for his deceit.

Anna arranges an elaborate ruse to make it appear that she is having an affair with David, an old flame, and let Philip catch David in her bedroom when he surprises her at midnight. Her plans go awry when David is hospitalized with a sports injury. She persuades her elderly butler, Carl, to stand in as David, step out of her bedroom in a silk robe as the clock strikes midnight, be seen in the shadows as Philip arrives for his surprise, and then step away quickly before being recognized. They practice Carl's entrance while the clock strikes twelve. Meanwhile, Philip has had second thoughts about his confirmed bachelorhood.

As the clock strikes midnight on Anna's birthday, Philip appears and proposes marriage to Anna, presenting her with a diamond bracelet, just as Carl slips in the room and then slips back into Anna's bedroom. Before Anna can explain the ruse, Philip expresses anger at her infidelity and leaves. Anna is distraught, but Philip returns, and she clears up the confusion. Anna suggests that they both forgive their respective deceptions and be happy with the way things are, but Philip now is adamant about getting married. Anna is overwhelmed with joy, and the couple embrace.

== Cast ==
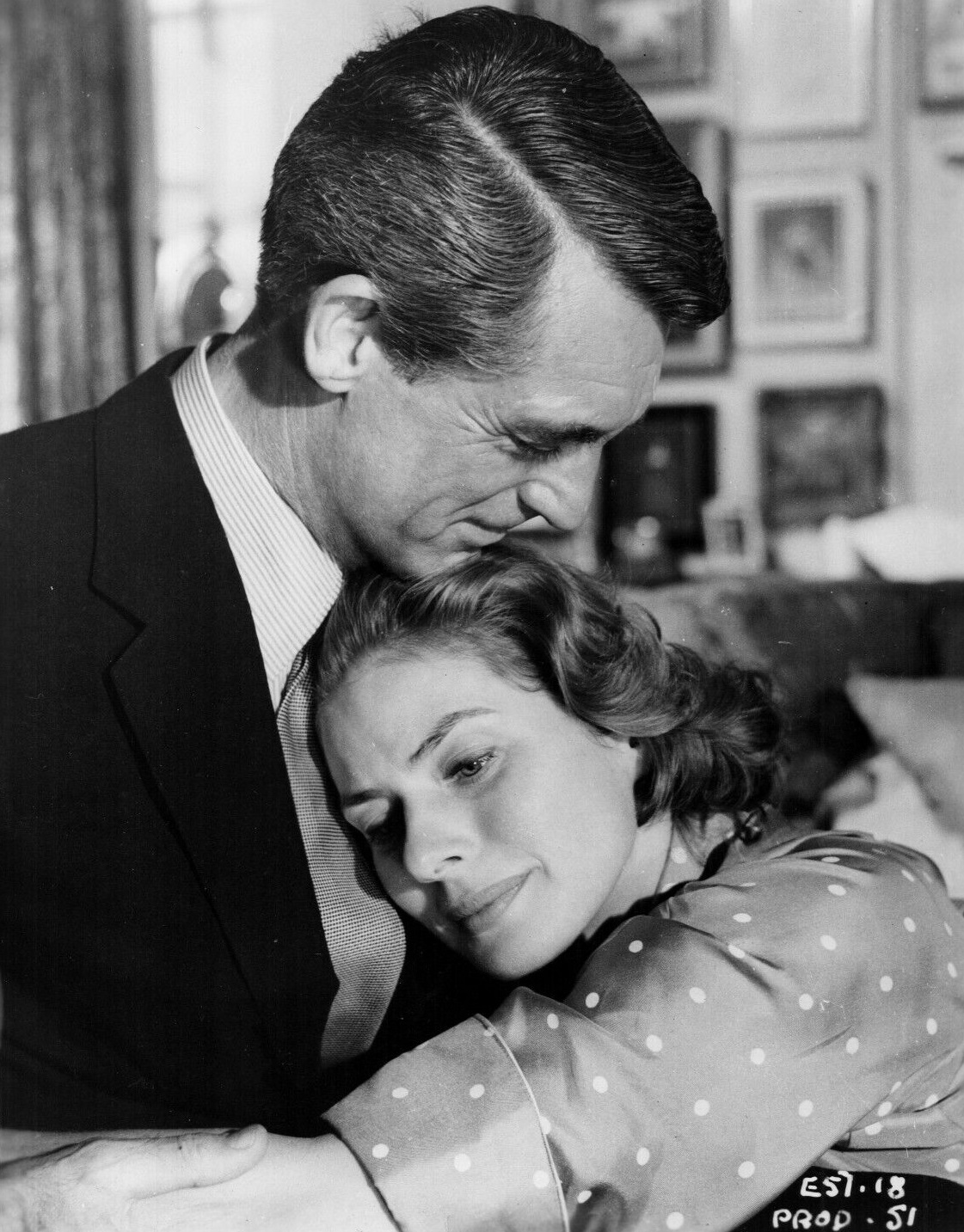
Cary Grant as Philip Adams and Ingrid Bergman as Anna Kalman.

- Cary Grant as Philip Adams
- Ingrid Bergman as Anna Kalman
- Cecil Parker as Alfred Munson
- Phyllis Calvert as Margaret Munson
- David Kossoff as Carl Banks
- Megs Jenkins as Doris Banks
- Oliver Johnston as Mr. Fingleigh
- Frank Hawkins as William, The Bellboy
- Michael Anthony as Oscar
- Richard Vernon as Leading Man
- Eric Francis as Lift Operator

== Production ==
No film studio sought the rights to the play Kind Sir, so Norman Krasna's co-producers – Joshua Logan, Mary Martin, and Charles Boyer – agreed to Krasna's offer to buy the rights himself for $10,000. Krasna did not tell his fellow producers he had lined up Cary Grant and Ingrid Bergman to star in a film.

In March 1955 United Artists announced Krasna would direct a film version for that studio. It was originally announced that the film would be made with either Marilyn Monroe or Jayne Mansfield, and with Clark Gable as the male star.

Krasna asked Stanley Donen if he wanted to direct while Donen was making Kiss Them for Me (1957) with Grant. Donen agreed "but only with Cary." Grant agreed but only if his co-star was Ingrid Bergman (the two had last acted together in Notorious [1946]). Bergman agreed provided the film could be shot in England; she had a theatre commitment in Paris. Krasna agreed to make the changes from the play. Donen and Grant formed a company together, Grandon Productions, to make the film. In September 1957 Bergman announced she and Grant would star in the film for Warner Bros. Pictures.

Scenes in the Players' Club were filmed at the Garrick Club in London. The club agreed to let them film there but not to use their name.

Logan saw the movie expecting to find it different from the play and was surprised to find it "verbatim" like Kind Sir. "Krasna's writing and my taste were more than vindicated," said Logan. "Had I been well [directing the play] it would have been another story."

== Reception ==
=== Box office ===
The film ranked in the top 10 British box office hits in terms of gross profits in 1958. Kinematograph Weekly listed it as being "in the money" at the British box office in 1958. In North America it made $3.6 million.

=== Critical ===
The Monthly Film Bulletin wrote: "The story line of this comedy is extremely simple. Donen has presumably tried to make a film without incident, and he almost succeeds: one is often on the point of being bored, but one never is, quite. Indeed, there are many charming scenes in which hardly anything at all happens: the walk through London, the first lunch at home, the telephone call from Paris (with split-screen effect amusingly used). Ingrid Bergman and Cary Grant are, to great effect, together again. She fails only towards the end of the film when she has to play the scorned woman; neither she nor Donen can quite manage this switch, and the film suffers accordingly." In British Sound Films: The Studio Years 1928–1959 David Quinlan rated the film as "good", writing: "Glossy, entertaining comedy of manners, with stars expertly dispensing surface charm."

Leslie Halliwell said: "Affairs among the ultra rich, amusing when played by these stars but with imperfect production values which the alarmingly thin plot allows one too much time to consider."

The Radio Times Guide to Films gave the film 3/5 stars, writing: "Two of the screen's most elegant stars provide much of the pleasure in this glossy romantic comedy, adapted by Norman Krasna from his play Kind Sir. The action has been transplanted from New York to foggy London (it was filmed at Elstree) with Ingrid Bergman as a famous actress looking for love and Cary Grant as the diplomat who's pretending he's married when he's not. Highlights include Grant dancing a superb Highland reel and a witty supporting performance as a chauffeur in disguise from the underrated David Kossoff. It's nonsense, of course, but utterly charming."

== Accolades ==
Indiscreet was nominated for three 1959 Golden Globes, three 1959 BAFTAs, and one Writers Guild of America award but failed to win any of them.

== 1988 television remake ==
Indiscreet
- Directed by: Richard Michaels
- Written by: Norman Krasna; Walter Lockwood; Sally Robinson
- Based on: Kind Sir; 1954 play by Norman Krasna
- Produced by: John Davis
- Starring: Robert Wagner
- Cinematography: Bob Edwards
- Release date: 24 October 1988
- Country: USA
- Language: English

The film was remade as a 1988 television movie. It was announced in March 1987 as a vehicle for Robert Wagner. Wagner pitched the idea to CBS because he loved the original. Lesley-Anne Down's casting was announced in February 1988. Filming was supposed to start in February 1988 but was pushed back to mid April. Filming finished by May.

The Chicago Tribune wrote: "Leslie-Anne [sic] Down obviously is no Bergman... Wagner is no Grant, try as he may.... "Indiscreet" is more flimsy than brittle, filled with lighter-than-air dialogue and the old hiding-out-on-window-ledges and falling-out-of-rowboat gambits. On the up side there is Down, who at times looks positively Ava Gardnerian, whether parading around in backless dresses or demonstrating a very special talent for saucily closing doors with her tush."

The Los Angeles Times said: "The vapidity of both [lead] performances is magnified by come-hither camera shots that linger too long on their empty faces... Down has a little more flounce to the ounce, but the best she can do as a woman deceived is to fly into a deep snit. Production values evoke the silky-bland noblesse oblige that has been canonized for TV by "Dynasty" and "Knots Landing"."

"Go out and rent the original on video cassette", said The New York Times.
