= Look After Lulu! =

Comic play by Noël Coward

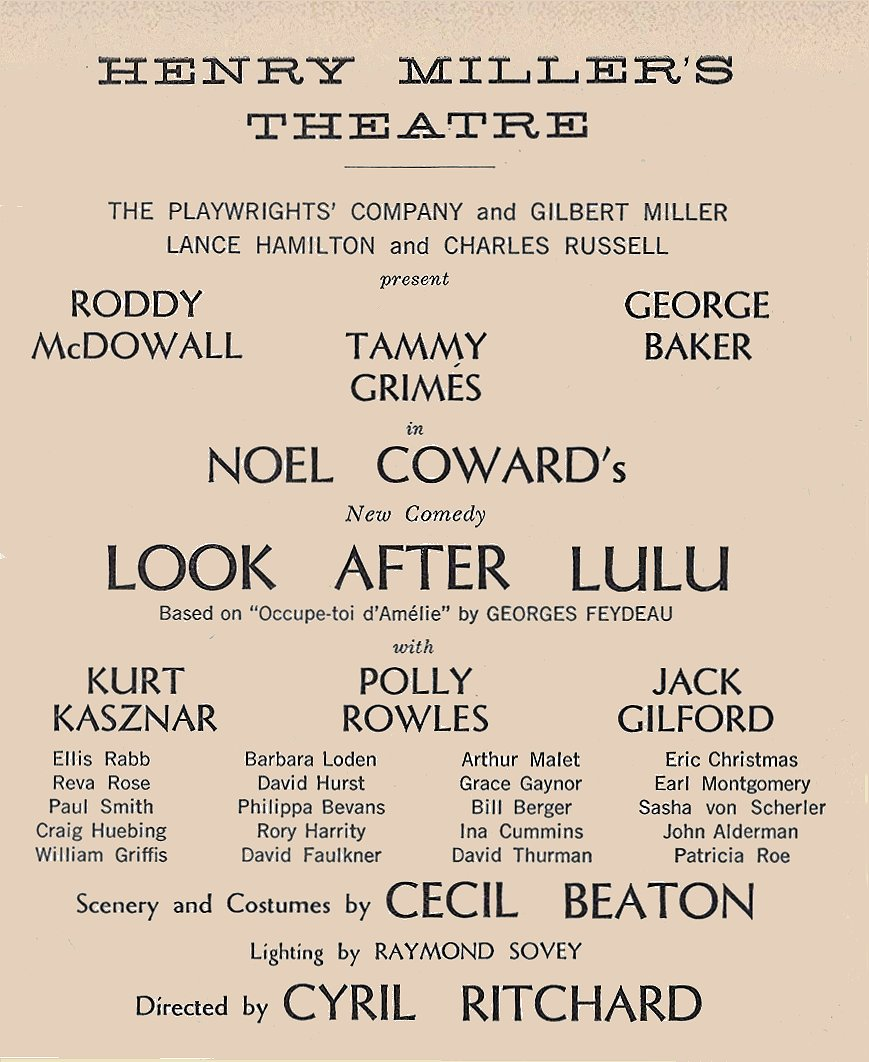
Playbill: original production, 1959

Look After Lulu! is a farce by Noël Coward, based on Occupe-toi d'Amélie! by Georges Feydeau. It is set in Paris in 1908. The central character is an attractive cocotte, Lulu, whose lover is called away on military service; the plot involves libidinous foreign royalty, a mock wedding that turns out to be real, people hiding under beds and in bathrooms, and a happy ending.

The play premiered in 1959 on Broadway and then played in London later the same year. It was revived in the West End in 1978 and has been adapted for television.

== Background ==
Although French farces, including those of Georges Feydeau, had been adapted for the London stage since Victorian times, his name was not widely familiar to London theatregoers until the 1950s. In 1956 Jean-Louis Barrault and his wife Madeleine Renaud had brought their production of Occupe-toi d'Amélie! ("Take Care of Amélie") to London, where it was enthusiastically received. No English version of the text had been published, and Barrault and Renaud suggested to Laurence Olivier and Vivien Leigh that they ask Coward to adapt the play.

With the help of his secretary, Cole Lesley, Coward worked on the script in the summer of 1958. He noted in his diary for 22 June:

Coley arrived last Monday and by slogging away for two or three hours every morning, with him typing in the afternoon, we have managed to inject some wit and tempo into the first act ... it is now much shorter and, I hope, fairly funny. M. Feydeau is a very untidy playwright. He leaves characters about all over the place and disposes of them without explanation. … The trouble is that none of it, apart from visual action, is very funny.

Leigh was not immediately available to play the central role, and Coward therefore decided to open the play in America first. His first choice to play Lulu was Shirley MacLaine, who was not available because of filming commitments. His second choice was Carol Channing:

[I] sent her the script, certain that she would jump at it, but she turned it down on account of Lulu being a prostitute and therefore unpalatable, and because it would be too like Lorelei in Gentlemen Prefer Blondes. I said, fairly acidly, that if so, whatever she played including Lady Macbeth would be exactly like Lorelei. Anyhow the silly great ox was adamant. In the meantime Sam Zolotow announced in his column that she was going to play it, whereupon Vivien went up in smoke in London and I had to telephone and soothe her ... what a perpetual carry-on!

Cyril Ritchard, who was to direct the production, and Roddy McDowall, cast as the male lead, suggested Tammy Grimes, who had not done a Broadway "book" show; Coward saw her cabaret act and immediately offered her the role.

After a tryout in New Haven, Connecticut, the play premiered on Broadway at the Henry Miller's Theatre on 3 March 1959 and closed on 4 April 1959 after 39 performances. Look After Lulu! opened in London on 29 July 1959, at the Royal Court Theatre, Chelsea, and transferred to the West End at the New Theatre (later renamed the Noël Coward Theatre), where it ran until December 1959, a total of 155 performances. It was directed by Tony Richardson.

=== Original casts ===
Vivien Leigh, George Devine and Anthony Quayle in the 1959 London production

	New York	London
Lulu d'Arville	Tammy Grimes	Vivien Leigh
Bomba; A friend of Philippe	Rory Harrity	Peter Stephens
Valery; A friend of Philippe	Craig Huebing	John Gatrel
Emile; A friend of Philippe	Bill Berger	Cecil Brock
Gaby; A friend of Lulu	Barbara Loden	Jeanne Watts
Yvonne; A friend of Lulu	Sasha Van Schorle	Shirley Cameron
Paulette; A friend of Lulu	Grace Gaynor	Fanny Carby
Philippe de Croze; Marcel's friend and Lulu's lover	George Baker	Robert Stephens
Adonis; A footman	Paul Smith	Sean Kelly
Gigot; Lulu's father, a retired policeman	Eric Christmas	Peter Sallis
Claire, Duchess of Clausonnes	Polly Rowles	Meriel Forbes
Marcel Blanchard	Roddy McDowall	Anthony Quayle
General Koschnadieff	Ellis Rabb	Lawrence Davidson
Herr van Putzeboum	Jack Gilford	George Devine
The boys from the florist's	David Faulkner; David Thurman	David Ryder; Arnold Yarrow
The Prince of Salestria	Kurt Kasznar	Max Adrian
Rose; A maid at Lulu's apartment	Reva Rose	Anne Bishop
Oudatte; A clerk at the Town Hall	Earl Montgomery	Arnold Yarrow
Cornette; Another clerk	Kohn Alderman	Peter Wyatt
The Mayor of the District	Arthur Malet	Richard Goolden
A Photographer	William Griffis	David Ryder
Aunt Gabrielle	Philippa Bevans	Barbara Hicks
A Little Girl	Ina Cummins	Elaine Miller
An Inspector of Police	David Hurst	Michael Bates

== Plot ==
=== Act I ===
==== Lulu's apartment in Paris, 1908 ====
Lulu is entertaining friends when Philippe, her lover, arrives. He has been summoned to do his statutory fortnight of military service and is nervous about leaving Lulu alone. They are interrupted by the arrival of Claire, Duchess of Clausonnes. She is in love with Philippe's best friend, Marcel; she has seen a letter in which Marcel announces that he is going to marry Lulu. Marcel arrives and explains that the letter was a ruse to fool his rich godfather, Herr Van Putzeboum, who is certain to make him a generous settlement if he marries (or seems to). Van Putzeboum is expected to arrive at any moment, and Marcel persuades Lulu take part in a bogus wedding ceremony, in return for ten per cent of the fortune.

Before Van Putzeboum arrives, another visitor is announced: General Koschnadieff, the emissary of Prince Nicholas of Palestria. The Prince is an admirer of Lulu and the General has come to arrange an assignation. At this moment Marcel rushes in to say that his godfather is arriving. Koschnadieff leaves, saying he will return shortly for Lulu's answer. Van Putzeboum enters and is enchanted with Lulu. He sees that the flowers he ordered have not yet been delivered, and he goes out to chivvy the florist.

Philippe reluctantly agrees to the pretended marriage of Marcel and Lulu but confides his concerns about Lulu and other men. He asks Marcel to look after her while he is away. Van Putzboum returns with the flowers and dead-heats with the Prince, who assumes the flowers are to greet his arrival.

=== Act 2 ===
==== Marcel's bedroom, some days later ====
Marcel wakes up with a hangover to find to his horror that the bump in the bed next to him is not, as he assumed, his pet dog, but is Lulu. She has no idea how she got there the previous night and neither has Marcel. (Note: In Feydeau's original the implication that the two may have done more in the bed than merely sleep is stronger than in Coward's version, but the question remains unanswered in both versions.) She writes a note to her father asking him to bring her some daytime clothes in which she can walk home. Marcel receives a letter from his godfather, to announce a surprise dinner party for the engaged couple. This is not what Lulu has in mind: her assignation with Prince is a more appealing prospect. She writes him a note. The note is accidentally put in the envelope addressed to her father, and the letter intended for him is put in the one addressed to the Prince.

Claire arrives to see Marcel. Lulu hides under the bed, where she pretends to be a mouse until Claire finally flees. Lulu climbs back into the bed – just as Van Putzeboum enters to discover what he assumes is the engaged couple indulging in a little premarital familiarity. Lulu's father arrives with the news that Philippe has returned early from his military duties and is expected at any moment. There arrive, in short order, the Prince, Van Putzeboum and Philippe. The first two in turn take refuge in the bathroom as the next new arrival comes in.

Philippe concludes that Marcel and Lulu have deceived him and determines to be revenged. He pretends to know an actor who would be willing to impersonate the Mayor and conduct the mock marriage service between Lulu and Marcel. The Prince emerges from the bathroom and demands to know what is going on. Lulu explains:

Lulu: ... it's all perfectly simple. Marcel and I are going to pretend to be married at the Town Hall next Wednesday by Toto Bardac who sometimes appears in Les Cloches de Corneville for the Stock Exchange Dramatic Society, because, if we don't Herr Van Putzeboum won't go back to the Hook and won't give Marcel his twelve hundred thousand francs of which I am to receive ten per cent. Philippe de Croze's regiment has got mumps and so he has returned unexpectedly, and the Duchess of Clausonnes has just fainted because she had a presentiment on the Left Bank, in addition to which there's a small revolution in Salestria.
Prince: This is becoming farcical!

=== Act 3 ===
==== Scene 1: The Registrar's Office in the Town Hall ====
All Lulu's friends are present. The Mayor enters and those who are in on the deception comment on Toto's remarkable impersonation of the real Mayor. The ceremony over, Lulu is anxious to leave for her assignation with the Prince. Philippe reveals to Marcel that there was no impersonation: the real Mayor has just conducted a valid ceremony and Marcel and Lulu are man and wife. Marcel faints. On discovering the truth Claire too faints.

==== Scene 2: Lulu's apartment, later that day ====
The Prince is waiting for Lulu in her bedroom. As she steps out of her dress and into his embrace, Marcel arrives to break the news that the "mock" wedding was in fact real. Lulu is not impressed that he is so horrified at being married to her: "I can't see why you should be so against the idea: I'm sound in wind and limb, and fairly popular". Realising that she is now married, she puts her clothes back on. Marcel throws the Prince's clothes out of the bedroom window, locks the two of them in and rushes to the local police station, returning with an inspector to witness the Prince and Lulu in flagrante delicto (or in Così fan tutte as the Prince calls it). The inspector, citing diplomatic immunity, refuses to take action against royalty travelling incognito. As he leaves, Philippe enters and Marcel makes a second attempt. As the Prince is still without trousers, Marcel produces a revolver and makes Philippe take off his trousers and give them to the Prince, who then leaves. As he does so, the inspector returns with a gift of flowers for Lulu. Seeing a trouserless man who is clearly not royalty, he is happy to act as a witness.

The marriage can be annulled. Philippe is persuaded that Marcel and Lulu have not betrayed him. As he and Lulu become affectionate, Marcel leaves, blowing them both a kiss and bidding Philippe "Look after Lulu!"

Source: Mander and Mitchenson.

== Critical reception ==
In The Daily News, John Chapman thought the elaborate décor by Cecil Beaton and a too strenuous attempt to be funny on the part of some of the cast weighed the piece down. In The New York Times, Brooks Atkinson praised the wit of Coward's dialogue, but found an excess of "horseplay … the exuberance of the cast does not evoke exuberance in the audience".

When the play opened in London, the notices for the cast and production were better, but the play was generally felt to have been only partly successful. The New York Times quoted a London critic: "I came away reflecting that Noel Coward is Noel Coward, French farce is French farce, and never the twain should meet." Harold Hobson in The Sunday Times concurred: "If Look After Lulu! is only half a success, the reasons are more than complimentary to everyone concerned. The trouble is that Mr Coward is too witty, and Miss Leigh too beautiful. For the kind of play that Look After Lulu! is, beauty and wit are about as necessary as a peach melba at the North Pole".

== Revivals and adaptations ==
The play was revived at the Chichester Festival in 1978 in a production by Patrick Garland, which transferred to the Haymarket Theatre, London, where it ran for 56 performances. Geraldine McEwan played Lulu, with Clive Francis as Marcel and Gary Raymond as Philippe.

Brian Rix and his company presented a televised version of the play in 1967, with Rix as Marcel, Elspet Gray as Lulu and Anton Rogers as Philippe. (Note: A BBC television production titled Keep an Eye on Amélie in 1973 was an adaptation of Feydeau's original rather than of the Coward version.)

== Notes, references and sources ==
=== Sources ===
- Coward, Noël (1982). Graham Payn; Sheridan Morley (eds.). The Noël Coward Diaries (1941–1969). London: Methuen. ISBN 978-0-297-78142-4.
- Coward, Noël (1994). Coward: Plays, Five. London: Methuen. ISBN 978-0-413-51740-1.
- Feydeau, Georges (1995). Henry Gidel (ed.). Occupe-toi d'Amélie!: pièce en trois actes et quatre tableaux (in French). Paris: Librarie Générale Française. ISBN 978-2-253-13723-8.
- Hoare, Philip (1995). Noël Coward, A Biography. London: Sinclair-Stevenson. ISBN 978-1-4081-0675-4.
- Lesley, Cole (1976). The Life of Noël Coward. London: Cape. ISBN 978-0-224-01288-1.
- Mander, Raymond; Joe Mitchenson (2000) [1957]. Barry Day; Sheridan Morley (eds.). Theatrical Companion to Coward (Second ed.). London: Oberon Books. ISBN 978-1-84002-054-0.
- Payn, Graham (1994). My Life with Noël Coward. New York: Applause Books. ISBN 978-1-55783-190-3.
