= High Spirits (musical) =

1964 musical

- Original Cast Recording
- Music: Hugh Martin; Timothy Gray
- Lyrics: Hugh Martin; Timothy Gray
- Book: Hugh Martin; Timothy Gray
- Basis: Blithe SpiritUltraman Powered HDremasterby Noël Coward
- Productions: 1964 Broadway; 1964 West End; 2026 Encores!

High Spirits is a musical with a book, lyrics, and music by Hugh Martin and Timothy Gray, based on the play Blithe Spirit by Noël Coward, about a man coping with the ghost of his dead wife.

Martin and Gray adhered closely to Coward's original text, while expanding the medium's character to the star role, initially calling the show Faster Than Sound. The playwright was delighted with their adaptation and agreed to direct it himself.

== Productions ==
The musical opened on Broadway at the Alvin Theatre on April 7, 1964, and closed on February 27, 1965, after 14 previews and 375 regular performances. Gower Champion aided Coward in directing the musical. Fred Werner was music director, scenic and costumes design were by Robert Fletcher, lighting design was by Jules Fisher, and Tammy Grimes' costume was by Valentina. The production was nominated for eight Tony Awards, but did not win any. Other major musical nominees that same year (1964) were Funny Girl and Hello, Dolly! and most major Tony wins went to the latter.

Originally, Coward had mentally cast Keith Michell as Charles, Gwen Verdon as Elvira, Celeste Holm as Ruth, and Kay Thompson as Madame Arcati, with Bob Fosse as director. Coward's dream cast failed to materialize, but he continued with the project.

An original cast recording of the Broadway cast was released on the ABC-Paramount label and the subsequent CD by MCA.

Coward also directed the West End production, which opened in November 1964 at the Savoy Theatre, where it ran for just 93 performances. A London cast album was released by Pye Records, for whom Coward himself also recorded four numbers from the show: "Something Tells Me", "If I Gave You", "Forever and a Day", and "Home Sweet Heaven". Cicely Courtneidge accepted the role of Madame Arcati. This was an unhappy episode in her career. Coward himself co-directed, and the two clashed constantly in rehearsal. Courtneidge later said, "Everyone does adore him – me included – but he's hell to work with, and I never want to do anything else with him. I'd have to be starving, I really would." After the opening night, Coward wrote in his diary, "Cis also got some well-deserved cracks for vulgarizing Madame Arcati, and serve her bloody well right." The notices for the piece were dreadful, and those for Courtneidge's performance scarcely better: The Guardian wrote of "a woeful excess of underplay", and The Observer commented, "The sight of Cicely Courtneidge hamming it until she drops in purple harem knickers with diamanté cycle clips isn't honestly hilarious enough to carry the evening."

42nd Street Moon in San Francisco, California presented a staged concert version of the musical in August 1997, and again in March and April 2009.

New York City Center presented a concert staging of High Spirits for its Encores! series in February 2026, starring Phillipa Soo as Ruth, Steven Pasquale as Charles, Andrea Martin as Madame Arcati, and Katrina Lenk as Elvira.

== Synopsis ==
=== Act 1 ===
Hampstead Heath, in the north of London, claims as two of its more distinguished residents the best-selling author of mystery novels, Charles Condomine, and his second wife, Ruth. They are preparing to entertain at dinner, and Madame Arcati is expected later to conduct one of her famous séances. After dinner Madame Arcati breezes in on her bicycle, explains the details of the forthcoming séance, and begins the session to communicate with a spirit in the unknown. The spirit is Charles’ late wife, Elvira, whose voice is audible only to Charles. Unexpectedly, Elvira, clad in a greenish cloud-like garment, flies across the room, unseen by the guests. Charles sees Elvira and has a lengthy conversation with her. He even tries to introduce her to Ruth, who is upset, thinking her husband has gone slightly daffy. Ruth storms out of the room, leaving Charles with Elvira. The next morning at breakfast, Ruth feels that Charles’ unusual behavior was due to the effects of alcohol, but when Elvira shoves a bowl of flowers in her face, Ruth believes. Ruth goes to Madame Arcati’s coffee shop, where she is surrounded by her student spiritualists, to plead with her to get rid of Elvira. Madame Arcati has bungled the job; she doesn’t know how to do it. While Ruth and Madame Arcati are having their difficulties, Charles and Elvira reminisce about their marriage. Charles agrees to take Elvira to the Penthouse Club for old times’ sake. She tries to convince Charles to forget everything and follow her, as she describes her astral activities. Excited about the wonderful things that Elvira describes, and encouraged by her, he mounts the parapet, extends his arms in an attempt to fly, and plunges out of sight.

=== Act 2 ===
Ruth points out to Charles, who as a result of his plunge has a bandaged head, that Elvira is attempting to kill him off. Elvira tampers with Charles’ car, hoping to kill him when he drives it. Instead Ruth drives it first and is killed. Elvira declares her spiritual return a flop because she hasn’t been successful in bringing Charles to her world. She confesses homesickness and sings about the extraordinary environment of her "Home Sweet Heaven." Charles and Elvira arrive at Madame Arcati’s coffee shop to try to send Elvira back home. To Madame Arcati’s delight, Charles’ consternation and Elvira’s disgust, Ruth suddenly appears, fully materialized. Ruth bemoans the fact that she will have to spend eternity alone with Elvira. By mystical machinations, Elvira places an "extremely long distance call" to Merlin the Magician, somewhere in the great beyond. Merlin immediately dispenses a deadly poison, "instant" hemlock, which is poured into the brandy decanter. Charles and his two ectoplasmic wives try to make the best of an impossible situation. Madame Arcati attempts to untangle the mess. She discovers that Edith, the maid, unknown even to herself, is a natural medium. She dematerializes the two ghostly wives. As the dematerialized spirits romp around the house, playing havoc with the furnishings, Charles and Madame Arcati drink a toast to their success. The poisoned brandy acts quickly with Charles and Madame Arcati joining Elvira and Ruth in the celestial world of the unknown, where they will all fly faster than sound forever.

== Cast and characters ==
Character	Broadway (1964)	West End (1964)	Encores! (2026)
Madame Arcati	Beatrice Lillie	Cicely Courtneidge	Andrea Martin
Elvira Condomine	Tammy Grimes	Marti Stevens	Katrina Lenk
Charles Condomine	Edward Woodward	Denis Quilley	Steven Pasquale
Ruth Condomine	Louise Troy	Jan Waters	Phillipa Soo
Edith	Carol Arthur	Denise Coffey	Rachel Dratch
Violet Bradman	Margaret Hall	Ann Hamilton	Jennifer Sánchez
Dr. George Bradman	Larry Keith	Peter Vernon	Campbell Scott
Beth	Beth Howland	Peta Pelham	
Bob	Robert Lenn	Matt Zimmerman	
Rupert	Gene Castle	Maurice Lane	

== Song list ==
Act I

- "Was She Prettier Than I?" - Ruth
- "The Bicycle Song" - Arcati and Ensemble
- "You'd Better Love Me" - Elvira
- "Where Is the Girl I Married?" - Charles and Ruth
- "The Sandwich Man" - Ensemble Member
- "Go Into Your Trance" - Arcati and Beatniks
- "Where Is the Man I Married?" (Reprise) - Charles and Ruth
- "Forever and a Day" - Charles
- "Something Tells Me" - Elvira
- "I Know Your Heart" - Elvira and Charles
- "Faster Than Sound" - Elvira and Ensemble

Act II

- "If I Gave You" - Ruth and Charles
- "Talking to You" - Arcati
- "Home Sweet Heaven" - Elvira
- "Something Is Coming to Tea" - Arcati and Beatniks
- "The Exorcism" - Instrumental
- "What In the World Did You Want?" - Charles, Ruth, and Elvira
- "Faster Than Sound" (Reprise) - Company

== Awards and nominations ==
=== Original Broadway production ===
Year	Award	Category	Nominee	Result
1964	Tony Award	Best Musical		Nominated
1964	Tony Award	Best Author	Hugh Martin and Timothy Gray	Nominated
1964	Tony Award	Best Composer and Lyricist	Hugh Martin and Timothy Gray	Nominated
1964	Tony Award	Best Performance by a Leading Actress in a Musical	Beatrice Lillie	Nominated
1964	Tony Award	Best Performance by a Featured Actress in a Musical	Louise Troy	Nominated
1964	Tony Award	Best Direction of a Musical	Noël Coward	Nominated
1964	Tony Award	Best Choreography	Danny Daniels	Nominated
1964	Tony Award	Best Conductor and Musical Director	Fred Werner	Nominated

== Bibliography ==
- Castle, Charles (1972). Noël. London: W H Allen. ISBN 978-0-491-00534-0.
