= Wit & Wisdom =

Wit & Wisdom is a play conceived and put together by Vivian Gornick and Nora Eisenberg and done by the Colleagues Theatre Company which premiered at the Off-Broadway Arclight Theatre in New York City, New York. It ran from March 5 to March 30, 2003.

== Plot ==
The show deals with age and getting older and featured readings from Nâzım Hikmet, Thomas Carlyle, M. F. K. Fisher, Langston Hughes, Arnold J. Toynbee, William Carlos Williams, Bertrand Russell, Dorothy Parker, Marguerite Duras, Jean Renoir, Colette, and Tennessee Williams.

== Cast ==
The staged reading was directed by Don Amendolia and featured a rotating cast that included Carmen De Lavallade, Sandy Duncan, Joan Copeland, Rita Gam, Peggy Pope, Tammy Grimes, Margery Beddow, Rosemary Harris, and Dina Merrill.
