= You'd Better Love Me =

Song by Tammy Grimes
- B-side: "Home Sweet Heaven"
- Released: 1964
- Length: 2:13
- Label: ABC-Paramount
- Songwriter(s): Hugh Martin; Timothy Gray

"You'd Better Love Me" is song written by Hugh Martin and Timothy Gray for the 1964 musical High Spirits. "You'd Better Love Me" and the B-side "Home Sweet Heaven" were originally performed by Tammy Grimes.

== Other recordings ==
- Petula Clark – B-side to "Downtown" (1964)
- Jack McDuff – The Dynamic Jack McDuff (1964, instrumental)
- Shirley Bassey – Shirley Bassey at the Pigalle (1965)
- Sonny Stitt – Broadway Soul (1965, instrumental)
- Nancy Wilson – From Broadway with Love (1966)
- Mel Tormé – That's All (bonus track on 1997 reissue)
- James Darren – This One's from the Heart (1999)
- Shirley Horn – You're My Thrill (2001)
