= Point of No Return (play) =

- Written by: Paul Osborn
- Based on: Point of No Return by John P. Marquand

Premiere
- Date: December 13, 1951
- Place: Alvin Theatre, New York City
- Directed by: H. C. Potter
- Original run: 13 December 1951 – 22 November 1952

Point of No Return was a Broadway play starring Henry Fonda and Frances Bavier. It was written by Paul Osborn, based on the novel of the same name by John P. Marquand.

Prior to its Broadway opening, Point of No Return had its world premiere in New Haven on 29 October 1951. It then moved to the Colonial Theatre in Boston for three weeks beginning 6 November 1951 and then two weeks at the Forrest Theatre in Philadelphia beginning 29 November 1951.

Point of No Return ran at the Alvin theater (now the Neil Simon Theatre) from 13 December 1951 – 22 November 1952.
