= Look After Lulu! (Brian Rix Presents...) =

- Brian Rix Presents... episode
- Directed by: Eric Fawcett
- Based on: Look After Lulu! by Noël Coward
- Presented by: Brian Rix
- Original air date: 28 March 1967
- Running time: 90 mins

"Look After Lulu!" is a 1967 British television version of the play of the same name by Noël Coward. It aired on BBC1. on 28 March 1967.

As of 2023 it is the only filmed version of the play.

The Observer's reviewer said, "Brian Rix showed what an excellent actor he is and Elspet Gray was a delightful Lulu. Eric Fawcett's production fizzed nice and fast all the way."

== Cast ==
- Lulu D'Arville – Elspet Gray
- Philippe de Croze – Anton Rodgers
- Adonis – Michael Mundell
- Gigot – Leo Franklyn
- Claire – Helen Jessop
- Marcel Blanchard – Brian Rix
- General Koschnadieff – Rex Garner
- Herr Van Putzeboum – Patrick Newell
- The Prince of Salestria – Dennis Ramsden
- Rose – Vicki Woolf
- Oudatte – Stefan Gryff
- The Mayor – Derek Royle
- Aunt Gabrielle – Sheila Mercier
- An Inspector of Police – Basil Lord

Source: BBC Genome.
