= Margery Beddow =

American actress

- Born: December 13, 1937; Grosse Pointe, Michigan, U.S.
- Died: January 3, 2010 (aged 72); New York, New York, U.S.
- Occupation(s): Actress, director, dancer and choreographer
- Children: 1

Margery Beddow (December 13, 1937 – January 3, 2010) was an American actress, dancer, director and choreographer.

== Early years ==
In her early career, Beddow was a prima ballerina of the Ballets Russes de Monte Carlo and a dancer with the Metropolitan Opera Ballet.

== Career ==
Beddow appeared on Broadway in Redhead, Conquering Hero, We Take the Town, Two on the Aisle, Almanac, Take Me Along, Ulysses in Nighttown, and revivals of Fiorello! and Show Boat. She appeared in seven Bob Fosse musicals. She had a small part in the Mel Brooks film The Producers and also appeared in the musical based on the film. She was in the rotating cast of the Off-Broadway staged reading of Wit & Wisdom.

Aside from Broadway, she choreographed many industrial shows including Chevrolet and Westinghouse in the 1970s. While touring the 1976 production of El Grande de Coca-Cola, she met co-actor Stephen Sweet with whom she had a long-standing relationship who coincidentally was one of the co-stars in the film Last House on Dead End Street.

In 2008, Beddow appeared as Mrs. Shields in the film version of the award-winning play, Doubt, which starred Meryl Streep and Amy Adams.

== Death ==
Beddow died on January 3, 2010, aged 78, at her home in New York from undisclosed causes. Her daughter, Pamela Saunders, was by her side.
