= Timothy Gray =

American singer

Timothy Gray (September 5, 1926 – March 17, 2007) was an American songwriter, author, singer and director, remembered for his partnership with Hugh Martin which produced High Spirits, a musical based on Noël Coward's play, Blithe Spirit.

== Biography ==
Gray, whose birth name was John Baker Gray, was born in Chicago and became a performer in vaudeville at the age of 16. He later performed on Broadway in musicals, including As the Girls Go, and Gentlemen Prefer Blondes, and then television, before becoming a writer and composer.

Timothy Gray also wrote the score of the London show Love From Judy and collaborated on High Spirits with Hugh Martin. Songs that he composed included "Forever and a Day", "Go and Get Your Old Banjo", "Was She Prettier Than I?", "Home Sweet Heaven", "You'd Better Love Me" and "If I Gave You".

For his work on High Spirits, he was nominated for Tony Awards for Best Author (Musical), Best Composer and Lyricist, and Best Musical. His other Broadway credits were Good News (1971) as vocal arranger, and the 1974 revival of Johnny Johnson, as producer.

Gray died in Sarasota, Florida, aged 80, in 2007.
