= Tammy Grimes =

American actress (1934–2016)

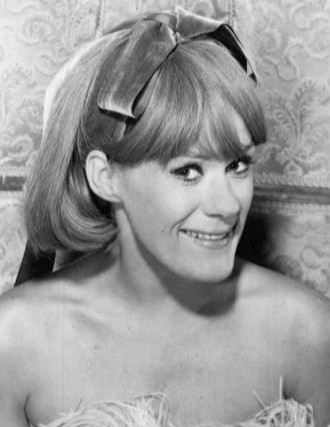
- Grimes in 1966
- Born: Tammy Lee Grimes; January 30, 1934; Lynn, Massachusetts, U.S.
- Died: October 30, 2016 (aged 82); Englewood, New Jersey, U.S.
- Occupations: Actress; singer
- Years active: 1952–2016
- Spouses: Christopher Plummer (m. 1956; div. 1960) Jeremy Slate (m. 1966; div. 1967) Richard Bell (m. 1971; died 2005)
- Children: Amanda Plummer

Tammy Lee Grimes (January 30, 1934 – October 30, 2016) was an American film and stage actress and singer.

Grimes won two Tony Awards in her career, the first for originating the role of Molly Tobin in the musical The Unsinkable Molly Brown and the second for starring in a 1970 revival of Private Lives as Amanda Prynne. Her first husband, Christopher Plummer, and their daughter, actress Amanda Plummer, are also Tony Award winners.

She originated the role of Diana in the Broadway production of California Suite. Grimes played the role of Elmire in the 1978 Broadway and television production of Tartuffe. She originated roles in several works by Noël Coward, including Elvira in High Spirits and Lulu in Look After Lulu! In 1966, she starred in her own television series, The Tammy Grimes Show. Grimes was also known for her cabaret acts. In 2003, she was inducted into the American Theater Hall of Fame.

== Early life ==
Grimes was born on January 30, 1934, in Lynn, Massachusetts, the daughter of Eola Willard (née Niles), a naturalist and spiritualist, and Luther Nichols Grimes, an innkeeper, country-club manager, and farmer.

She attended high school at a then all-girls school, Beaver Country Day School, and then Stephens College. She studied acting at New York City's Neighborhood Playhouse. She studied singing with Beverley Peck Johnson.

== Career ==
Known for a speaking voice compared to a buzz saw, she made her debut on the New York stage at the Neighborhood Playhouse in May 1955 in Jonah and the Whale. That same year, she portrayed the title role in the musical The Amazing Adele, a work which she performed in tryout performances and on tour, but which ultimately never made it to Broadway.

She made her Broadway stage debut as an understudy for Kim Stanley in the starring role in Bus Stop in June 1955. In 1956, she appeared in the off-Broadway production, The Littlest Revue, and had the lead role in 1959 in the Broadway production of Noël Coward's play, Look After Lulu!, after she was discovered in a nightclub by the playwright.

She starred in the 1960 musical comedy The Unsinkable Molly Brown, for which she won a Tony Award (Best Featured Actress in a Musical, though it was the lead role) for what The New York Times called her "buoyant" performance as a rough-hewn Colorado social climber. She portrayed the title character, a Western mining millionairess who survived the sinking of the Titanic. In 1964, she appeared in the episode "The He-She Chemistry" of Craig Stevens's CBS drama Mr. Broadway. She made two appearances on the early '60s TV series Route 66.

On May 16, 1960, Grimes acted and sang as Mehitabel in an abridged version of the musical Archy and Mehitabel as part of the syndicated TV anthology series The Play of the Week presented by David Susskind, and co-written by Mel Brooks and Joe Darion. The cast included Eddie Bracken (who reprised the role in the 1970 animated feature version Shinbone Alley with Carol Channing in the Mehitabel role) and Jules Munshin. Grimes was originally chosen to play the part given to Elizabeth Montgomery in the hit television situation comedy Bewitched, but she turned down the offer, preferring to star in The Tammy Grimes Show. She appeared in the television drama Route 66 on December 13, 1963, in an episode titled "Come Home Greta Inger Gruenschaffen".

In 1964, she appeared on Broadway as Elvira Condomine in High Spirits, a musical version of Noël Coward's Blithe Spirit.

In 1966, Grimes starred in her own ABC television series, The Tammy Grimes Show, in which she played a modern-day heiress who loved to spend money. The series ran for only a month, although an additional six episodes had already been made. Critics described Grimes as a talented performer misused in the series. She played "Mrs. Fred Beery" opposite Roddy McDowall in a 1979 episode of The Love Boat.

Returning to the Broadway stage in 1969 after almost a decade of performing in what The New York Times called "dubious delights", Grimes appeared in a revival of Noël Coward's Private Lives as Amanda, winning the Tony Award for Best Actress. Clive Barnes in a New York Times review called her performance "outrageously appealing. She plays every cheap trick in the histrionic book with supreme aplomb and adorable confidence. Her voice moans, purrs, splutters; she gesticulates with her eyes, almost shouts with her hair. She is all campy, impossible woman, a lovable phony with the hint of tigress about her, so ridiculously artificial that she just has to be for real."

Grimes' intermittent film appearances included Play It as It Lays (1972), Mr. North (1988) and High Art (1998).

She was a member of the Stratford Festival of Canada acting company in 1956, and returned again in 1982 to appear as Madame Arcati in Blithe Spirit. In addition to appearing in a number of television series and motion pictures, Grimes also entertained at various New York City night clubs and recorded several albums of songs. She recited poetry as part of a 1968 solo act in the Persian Room of the Plaza Hotel. Her voice can be heard in romantic duets on some of Ben Bagley's anthology albums of Broadway songs on his Painted Smiles Records label. In 1982, Grimes hosted the final season of the CBS Radio Mystery Theater replacing E.G. Marshall who had hosted the show since it premiered in 1974. In 1983, Grimes was dismissed from her co-starring role in the Neil Simon play Actors and Actresses, reportedly due to an inability to learn her lines.

In 1974, Grimes provided the voice for Albert, the cerebral-minded mouse that does not believe in Santa Claus, in the animated Rankin-Bass annual television Christmas special, Twas the Night Before Christmas; she later worked with Rankin/Bass again for 1982's The Last Unicorn. In 1980, she starred in the original Broadway production of the musical 42nd Street. In 2003, Grimes was inducted into the American Theater Hall of Fame. She also appeared in the rotating cast of the off-Broadway staged reading of Wit & Wisdom.

In December 2003, Grimes was invited by the Noël Coward Society to be the first celebrity to lay flowers on the statue of Sir Noël Coward at the Gershwin Theatre in Manhattan to celebrate the 104th birthday of "The Master". In 2004, she joined the company of Tasting Memories, a "compilation of delicious reveries in poetry, song, and prose", with a starry rotating cast including Kitty Carlisle Hart, Rosemary Harris, Philip Bosco, Joy Franz, and Kathleen Noone.

In 2005, Grimes worked with director Brandon Jameson to voice UNICEF's multiple award-winning tribute to Sesame Workshop. Two years later, she returned to the cabaret stage in a critically acclaimed one-woman show. Around this time, she was voted as vice president of the Noël Coward Society.

== Personal life ==
Grimes married Christopher Plummer on August 16, 1956, with whom she had a daughter, actress Amanda Plummer. They divorced in 1960.

Her second husband was actor Jeremy Slate, whom she married in 1966 and divorced a year later. Her third husband was composer Richard Bell; they remained together until Bell's death in 2005.

In 1965, Grimes made headlines after she had been beaten and injured twice in four days in New York City, by what were described as "white racists". According to a report, she believed the attacks were related to her association with several black entertainers and recent appearances in public with Sammy Davis Jr., who was said to be staging a nightclub act for her.

== Death ==
Grimes died on October 30, 2016, in Englewood, New Jersey, aged 82 from natural causes. She was survived by her brother Nick, daughter Amanda and her ex-husband Christopher who died in 2021.

== Awards ==
- Obie Award for Best Actress – Clerambard (1958)
- Theatre World Award – Look After Lulu (1959)
- Tony Award for Best Featured Actress in a Musical – The Unsinkable Molly Brown (1961)
- Tony Award for Best Actress in a Play – Private Lives (1970)

== Discography ==
Grimes released three known one-off singles during the 1960s, none of which charted:

- "Home Sweet Heaven"/"You'd Better Love Me" (ABC-Paramount 10551) 1964, from High Spirits, 1964
- "The Big Hurt"/"Nobody Needs Your Love More Than I Do" (Reprise 0487), 1966
- "I Really Loved Harold"/"Father O'Conner" (Buddah 99), 1969

Her debut solo album, Julius Monk presents Tammy Grimes (1959), featured the music from her one-woman show at the NYC nightclub Downstairs at the Upstairs. The album was re-released on the AEI label in 1982. She recorded two albums for Columbia Records, Tammy Grimes (CS-8589 stereo/CL 1789 mono) in 1962, and The Unmistakable Tammy Grimes (CS 8784 stereo/CL 1984 mono) in 1963. In 2004, the Collectables CD label licensed both LPs from Sony Music and released the combination as The Unmistakable Tammy Grimes (Collectables CD 7649).

She is featured on the following original cast recordings: The Littlest Revue, The Unsinkable Molly Brown, High Spirits, 42nd Street, and Sunset, as well as a TV cast album of the televised version of George M. Cohan's 45 Minutes from Broadway. All have been released on CD, although High Spirits is now out of print.

Grimes did the introductory narration for the American rebroadcast of the BBC's 1981 radio production of The Lord of the Rings. She recorded an album of children's stories, read out loud, called Hurray for Captain Jane! in 1975.

== Theater ==
- The Littlest Revue (1956)
- Clerambard (1958)
- Look After Lulu! (1959)
- The Unsinkable Molly Brown (1960)
- Rattle of a Simple Man (1963)
- High Spirits (1964)
- The Only Game in Town (1968)
- Private Lives (revival) (1969)
- A Musical Jubilee (1975)
- California Suite (1976)
- Tartuffe (revival) (1977)
- Trick (1979)
- 42nd Street (1980)
- Blithe Spirit (1982)
- Sunset (1983)
- Orpheus Descending (revival) (1989)
- Wit & Wisdom (2003)

== Filmography ==
=== Film ===
- Three Bites of the Apple (1967) – Angela Sparrow
- Arthur? Arthur! (1969) – Lady Joan Mellon
- Play It as It Lays (1972) – Helene
- Somebody Killed Her Husband (1978) – Audrey Van Santen
- The Runner Stumbles (1979) – Erna Webber
- Can't Stop the Music (1980) – Sydney Channing
- The Last Unicorn (1982) – Molly Grue (voice)
- The Stuff (1985) – Special Guest Star in Stuff Commercial
- America (1986) – Joy Hackley
- Mr. North (1988) – Sarah Baily-Lewis
- Slaves of New York (1989) – Georgette
- Backstreet Justice (1994) – Mrs. Finnegan
- A Modern Affair (1995) – Dr. Gresham
- Trouble on the Corner (1997) – Mrs. K
- High Art (1998) – Vera

=== Television ===
Tammy Grimes television credits
Year	Title	Role	Notes
1960	The Play of the Week	Mehitabel	Episode: "Archy and Mehitabel" (S1.E32 based on the play)
1963	Route 66	Celli Brahms / Greta Inger Gruenschaffen	2 episodes
1964	Mr. Broadway	Nella	Episode: "The He-She Chemistry"
1966	The Tammy Grimes Show	Tammy Ward	6 episodes
1971	NBC Children's Theatre	Self	Episode: "Super Plastic Elastic Goggles"
1973	The Horror at 37,000 Feet	Mrs. Pinder	TV movie
1973	The Borrowers	Homily Clock	TV movie
1974	'Twas the Night Before Christmas	Albert (voice)	TV special
1979	The Love Boat	Christine (Mrs. Fred Beery)	1 episode
1986	The Equalizer	Julia Jacobs	Episode: "A Community of Civilized Men"
1987	My Little Pony	Catrina (voice)	Episode: "My Little Pony: Escape from Catrina"
