= Kind Sir =

- Written by: Norman Krasna
- Characters: 3 M 3 F
- Original language: English
- Subject: Comedy
- Setting: The New York apartment of Miss Jane Kimball

Premiere
- Date premiered: 26 September 1953 (New Orleans); 4 November 1953 (New York)
- Place premiered: Alvin Theatre, New York

Kind Sir is a 1953 play written by Norman Krasna and directed by Joshua Logan. It was the inspiration for the 1958 film Indiscreet.

== Background ==
Norman Krasna had written the play by June 1950. He was delayed putting it on by working with Jerry Wald at RKO.

Joshua Logan says Krasna told him he wrote it with Alfred Lunt and Lynn Fontanne in mind for the leads. Logan says after he read the play "I was amazed again at the way Norman could take a small misunderstanding, a white lie, and turn it into a full-length, funny and even romantic play... It did not have the GI humor and lustiness of John Loves Mary but it was brilliantly constructed and had the glamour and delightful aura of drawing room comedy that had been missing from the theatre for years." Logan called it "a good play. It had all the craftsmanship of the best Pinero farce - plus the charm and elegance of something by Lonsdale or Maugham."

Logan offered the female lead to Joan Crawford who read the first two acts on stage just to see if she would do it but did not want to commit to a stage play. Charles Boyer agreed to play the male lead and Mary Martin the female lead. Rehearsals began in September. "I know we'll have to work terribly hard to make it terrible," said Logan of the play.

Logan struggled with mental health issues during rehearsals. In October 1953 he checked into a sanitorium for several weeks.

The production cost $75,000. This was entirely provided by Krasna, Logan and the stars.

== Original cast ==
- Charles Boyer as Philip Clair
- Mary Martin as Jane Kimball
- Frank Conroy as Alfred Munson
- Margalo Gillmore as Anna Miller
- Robert Ross as Carl Miller
- Dorothy Stickney as Margaret Munson

== Reception ==
The New York Times called it "trivial theatre that is spasmodically entertaining."

The play had a huge advance but reviews were not strong and it ran on Broadway for 166 performances. Logan said although the play had a million dollar advance, the largest ever for a nonmusical play, reviews were poor. "My great idea of pairing Mary Martin and Charles Boyer in a light romantic comedy had backfired," Logan wrote. "The public came to see a combination of South Pacific, Algiers and Mayerling. With their appetites set for a juicy steak dinner they had been served fish. Exquisitely prepared fish but nevertheless not steak. And the shock to the taste buds caused not only disappointment but anger."
