= Sugar Refinery Stokholm =

Historic building in Dordrecht, Netherlands

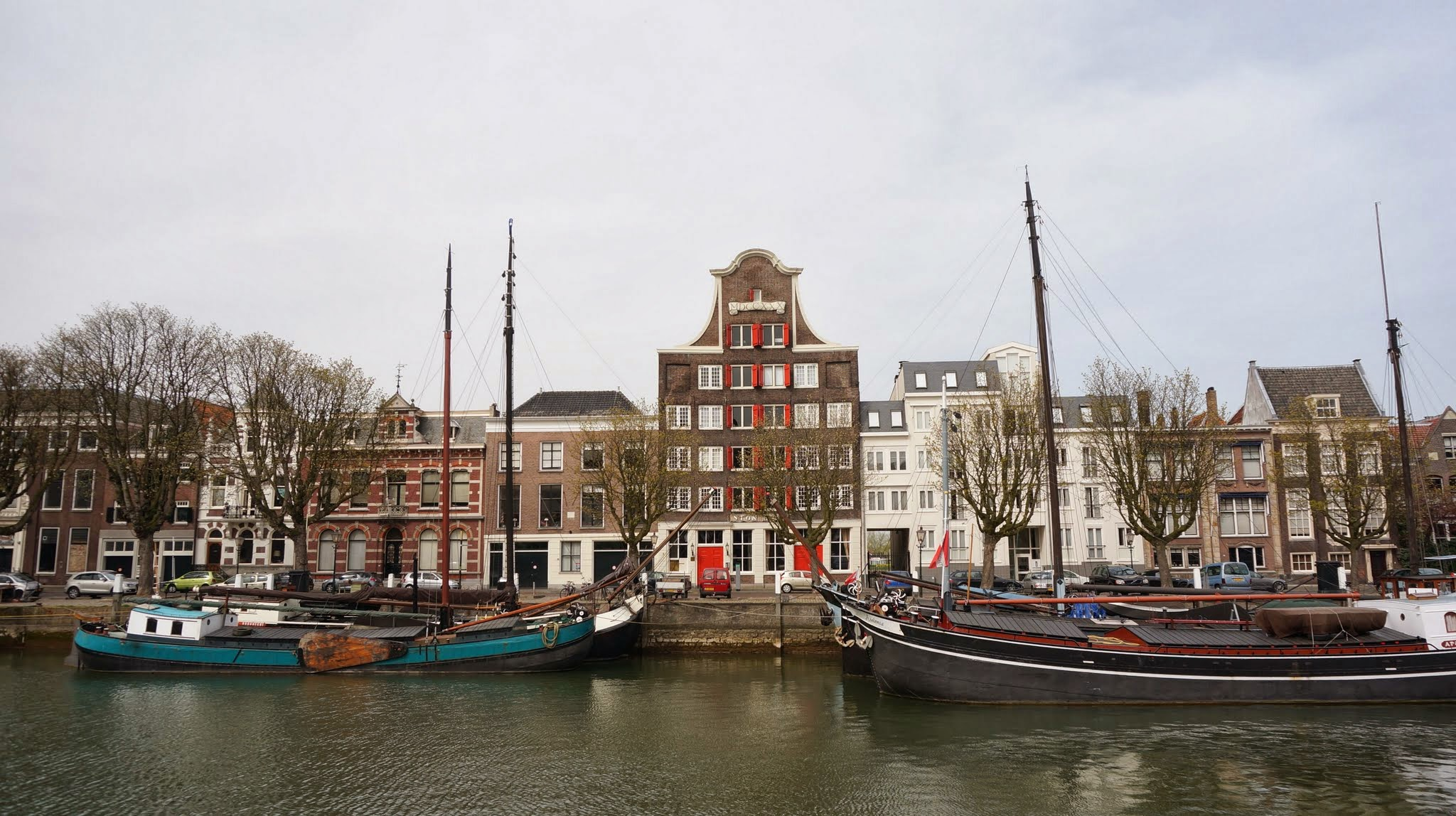
- The old sugar refinery is higher than other buildings of the time.
- Interactive map of Sugar Refinery Stokholm

General information
- Type: Sugar refinery
- Location: Wolwevershaven 30, Dordrecht, Netherlands
- Coordinates: 51°49′6.24″N 4°39′56.7″E
- Year built: 1730
- Renovated: 1962-1963

The Sugar Refinery Stokholm is an 18th century listed building in Dordrecht, the Netherlands. It is now an office building, but was constructed as a sugar refinery. This still shows in the height and massive scale of the building.

== History ==
=== Johan Anthonij Bruijn (1730–1737) ===
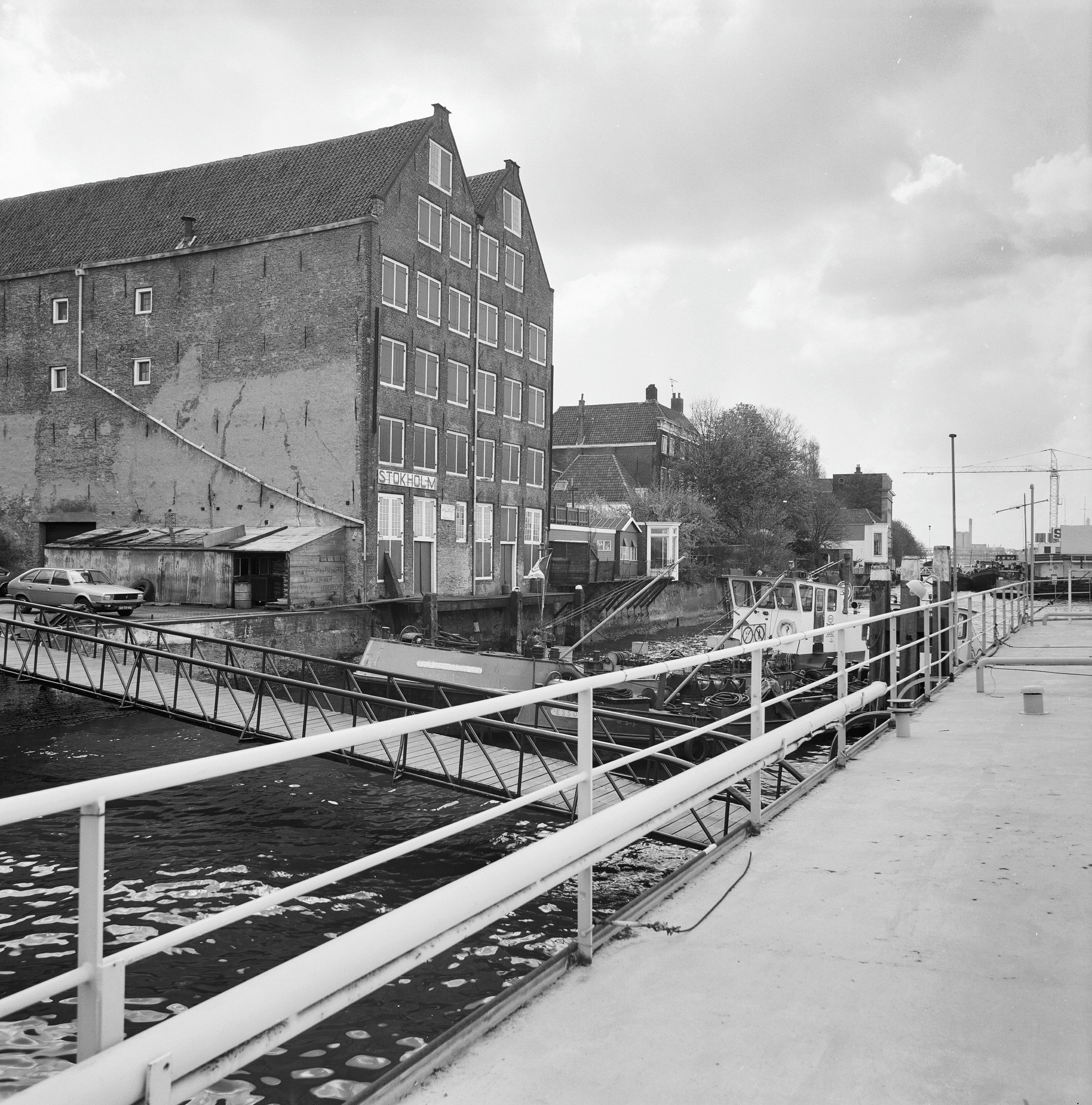
Backside of the building on the Oude Maas

Johan Anthony Bruijn was born in Stockholm in about 1695. In 1730 he bought the grounds beneath the current building from the Dutch West India Company for 4,500 guilders. He then demolished everything and build the massive sugar refinery that still dominates the Wolwevershaven. The total investment in the new refinery was at least 24,500 guilders.

The refinery was not successful. By 1736 its debts had increased to 35,000 guilders, and the owner filed for bankruptcy. On 25 and 30 January 1737 the sugar refinery 'Stokholm', obviously named for the owner's place of birth would be sold. The description said it had 5 (complete) floors above the ground floor. It had two sugar loaf drying rooms and one sugar candy drying room. There were six copper pans (Ziedpannen} as well other utensils.

The number of floors as well as the number of pans was exceptional. In 1793 a well known writer about sugar refineries did not even know of such a number of pans being used in a Dutch refinery. It seems as if Bruijn had planned to create a refinery process that would profit from economies of scale and process optimalisations, but that it did not yield enough profits to repay the investments.

=== Adriaan Onder de Linden and Egbertus van der Sweth (1737–1754) ===
In March 1737 the sugar refiner Adriaan Onder de Linden acquired the refinery for 17,220 guilders. He also owned the Sugar Refinery De Raapkoek en de Wildeman. In 1743 he sold half of both to Egbertus van der Sweth, who became his business partner. In 1754 both refineries as well as four houses and warehouses were sold.

=== Consortium of sugar refiners (1754–1777) ===
A consortium of sugar refineries bought both refineries in 1754; Stokholm for 9,150 guilders and De Raapkoek en de Wildeman for 820 guilders. The eight buyers were: Heirs of Frederick Wilkens; Johannes Balthus & Co; Widow Willem Bruijn & Zn; Widow Jan Rens; Backer en Van der Elst; Rens en Van der Wall; Meijer en Van Volkom; Den Ouden en Van den Broek. It is probably that they bought the refinery in order to close down the big competitor. It is known that Stokholm was closed down in 1766 or before.

=== Warehouse (1777) ===
In April 1777 Pieter van Esch Cornelisz. bought Stokholm for 11,000 guilders. The consortium helped him with a no-interest loan of 5,000 guilders. Stokholm now became a warehouse.

=== Schouten & Co (1850–1883) ===
On 1 January 1850, the partnership of Hubert and Leendert Schouten succeeded to the partnership of M. W. Rees & Co, that traded in the dyer's madder, cereals and seed etc. In 1857 the company H. & L. Schouten & Co were trading in Dordrecht. In 1865 or before, the Schouten company held office in Stokholm. In October 1883 Stokholm, previously home to a wholesale company in the dyer's madder and cereals was sold again.

== Current use ==
In 1983, the Wolwevers harbor in front of Stokholm, was getting repurposed as a kind of maritime museum. It meant that many historic ships were allowed to make the harbor their permanent mooring. There were also plans to use Stokholm for tourism, but it was also readied as an office building. Stokholm meanwhile did get a kind of cultural purpose.

The touristic and cultural plans for Stokholm would not succeed. In 1995, 580 m^{2} of office space were offered in the building.
