= Mässmogge =

Swiss type of candy

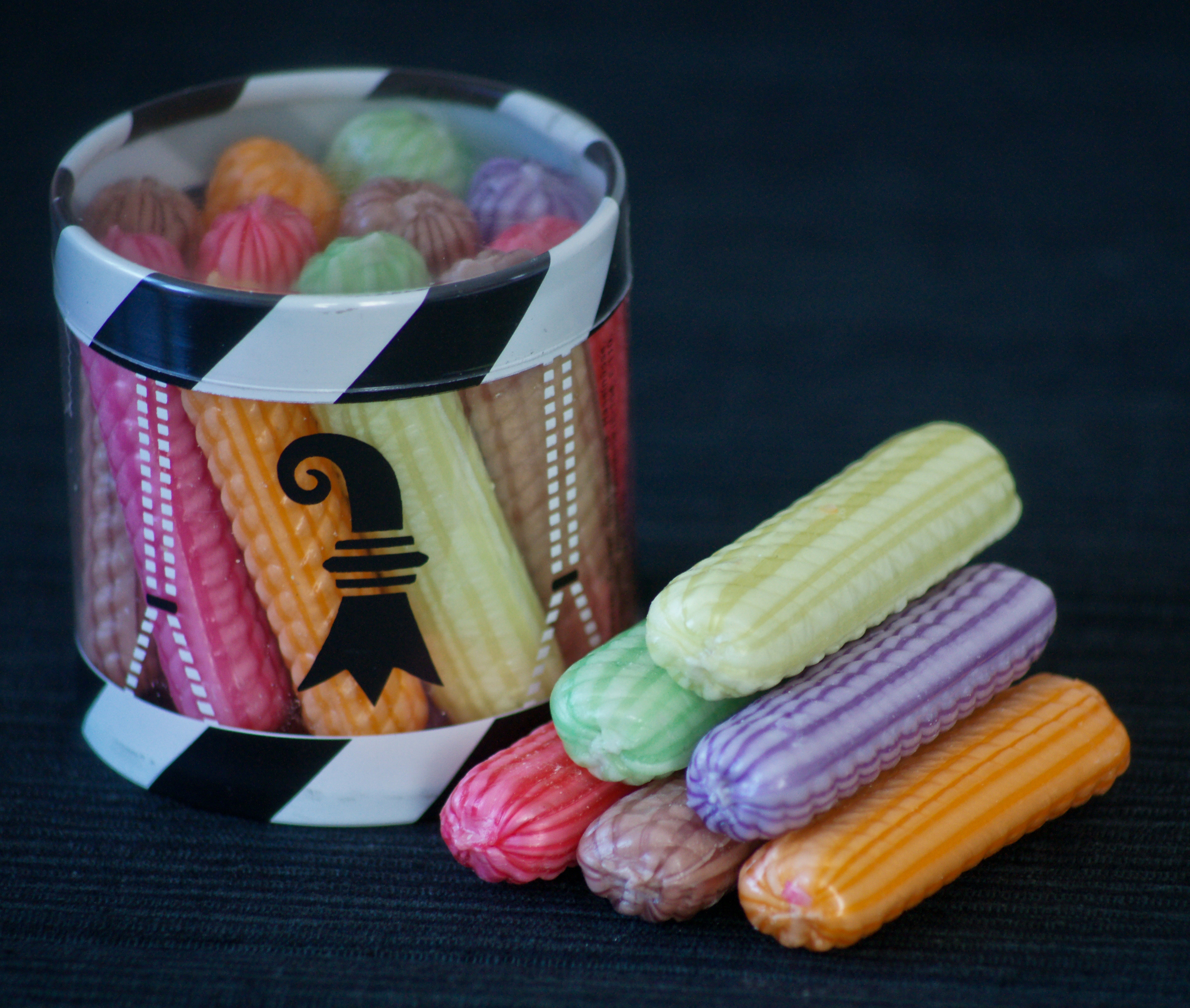
- Type: Sugar candy
- Place of origin: Switzerland
- Region or state: Basel
- Main ingredients: Hazelnuts
- Variations: Glasmogge

Mässmogge is a Swiss thumb-sized, hazelnut praline-filled sugar candies. They are a regional and seasonal specialty of Basel, Switzerland, where they are made and sold at around the time of the autumn fair.

== Name ==
"Mässmogge" and its spelling variants "Mässmögge", "Mässmocke" or "Messmocken" are words in Basel German, the local dialect. "Mäss-" refers to the Messe, the fair at which the candy is sold, while "Mogge" is derived from the Middle High German word Mocken, meaning "big piece" or "lump".

== Description and economic significance ==
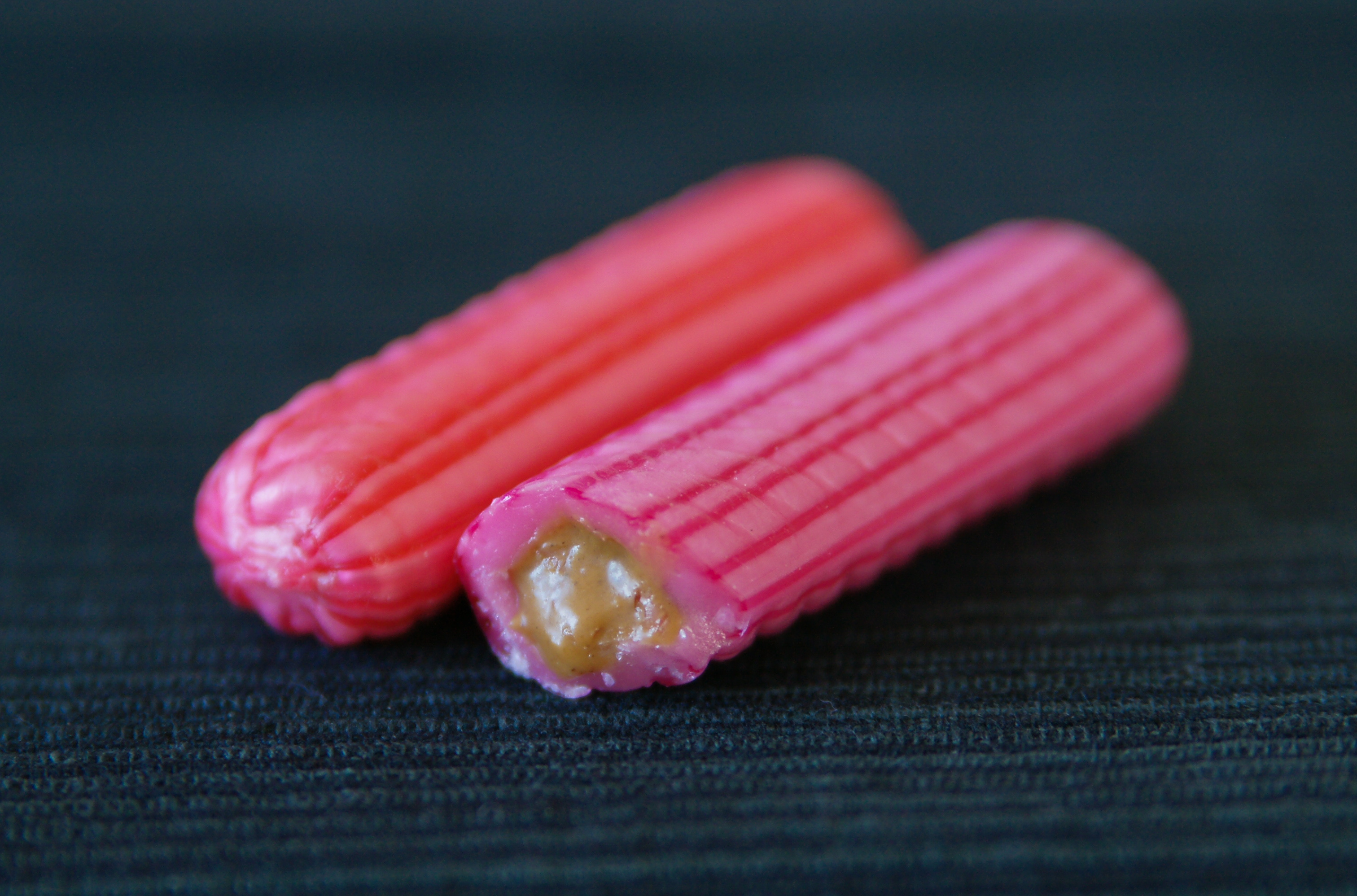
An open Mässmogge, showing the hazelnut praline filling.

Mässmogge are about 5.5 centimetres (2 in) long, 2 centimetres (0.8 in) wide and weigh about 14 grams (0.5 oz). They consist of a striped, colored, rather soft sugar candy shell in various flavors (chocolate, lemon, strawberry, etc., corresponding to the shell's color), and of a soft hazelnut praline mass at the center, which has a more pronounced flavor than the shell.

A variant, the Glasmogge ("lump of glass") has no hazelnut filling. It consists only of a piece of sugar candy, which is normally green and peppermint-flavored.

As of 2008, about one million Mässmogge are produced annually, of which 70% are the hazelnut-filled variant. Half of the production is sold to market traders visiting fairs across Switzerland, although most Mässmogge are sold at the Basel autumn fair. The other half is produced for retail and specialty stores mostly in and around Basel and Solothurn.

== Production ==
Mässmogge are produced largely by hand in a complicated process. The candy mass, made of sugar, glucose and water, is warmed to 134 degrees Celsius, agitated in order to become airy and white, colored and folded into a striped, layered paste. The filling, consisting of roasted and ground hazelnuts with some fat and sugar, is then spread over the candy mass. The paste is wrapped into a 50 kilograms (110 lb) roll, which is drawn out by a machine to a length of about 2.5 kilometres (1.6 mi), and separated into the individual Mässmogge. The whole process must take no more than 25 minutes, in order to keep the candy mass warm and malleable.

== History ==
Candy canes were first introduced by French confectioners at Basel fairs in the 1860s, and sold in the form of thick candy lumps since about 1879. The confectioner Leonz Goldinger invented the current Mässmogge, with a hazelnut filling, at around 1900. At that time, the candies were produced directly at the fair and sold while still warm.

Up until the 1960s, several confectioners produced Mässmogge for the Basel fairs. Because of the expense of producing the candy, the number of manufacturers has since dwindled to one, Sweet Basel AG.

== See also ==
- Culinary Heritage of Switzerland
