= Good & Plenty =

Brand of licorice candy by Hershey

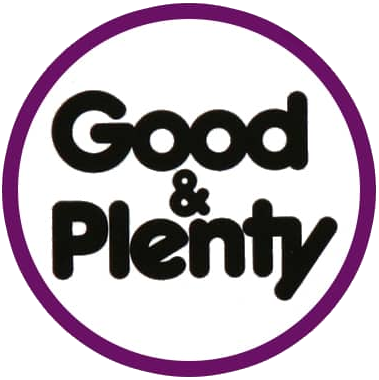

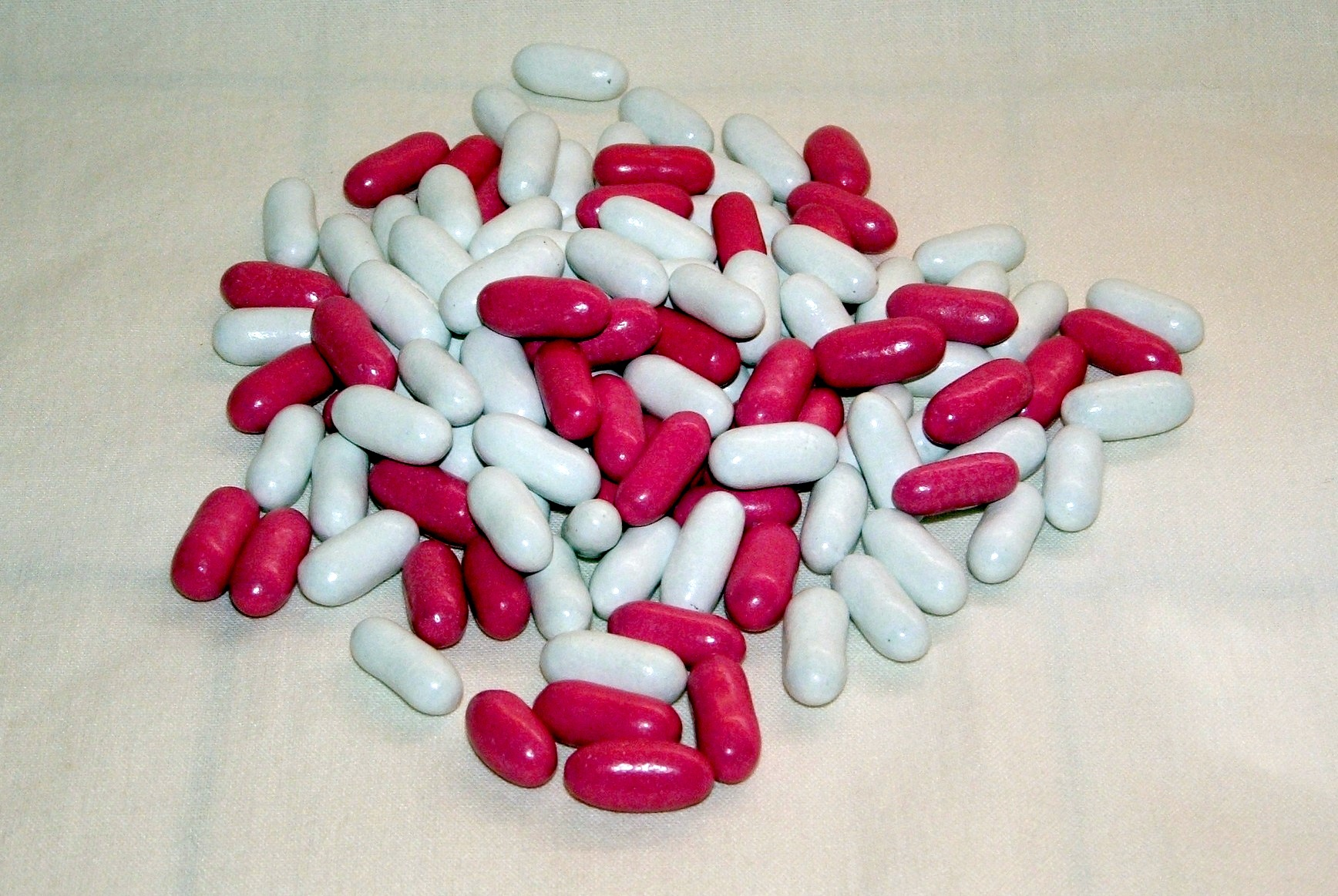
- Pieces of Good & Plenty
- Product type: Candy coated licorice
- Current owner: Highlander Partners/Iconic IP Interests
- Produced by: The Hershey Company
- Country: Philadelphia, Pennsylvania, U.S.
- Introduced: 1893; 133 years ago
- Related brands: Twizzlers
- Markets: United States
- Previous owners: Quaker City Chocolate & Confectionery Company; Warner-Lambert; Leaf, Inc.
- Ambassador: Choo Choo Charlie
- Tagline: "Love my Good and Plenty!"
- Website: hersheyland.com/goodandplenty

Good & Plenty is a brand of licorice candy. The candy is a narrow cylinder of sweet black licorice, coated in a hard candy shell to form a capsule shape. The pieces are colored bright pink and white and presented in a purple box or bag.

== History ==
Good & Plenty was first produced by the Quaker City Chocolate & Confectionery Company of Philadelphia, Pennsylvania, in 1893. Although Necco Wafers is almost half a century older, Good & Plenty is the oldest continually produced American candy brand. A second candy, Good & Fruity, is a multicolored, multi-flavor candy of the same shape.

Warner-Lambert purchased Quaker City in 1973 and sold it to Leaf Candy Company (owned by Beatrice Foods) in 1982. The brand is now owned by Highlander Partners (a Dallas-based global private equity firm) and produced by Hershey Foods under license.

Beginning around 1950, a cartoon character named "Choo-Choo Charlie" appeared in Good & Plenty television commercials. Choo-Choo Charlie was a boy pretending to be a railroad engineer. He would shake a box of the candy in his hand in a circular motion, imitating a train's pushrods and making a sound like a train. Advertising executive Russ Alben wrote the "Choo-Choo Charlie" jingle based on the popular song "The Ballad of Casey Jones".

== See also ==
- Mike and Ike
- Mukhwas
- London drops, a similar candy sold in Finland and Sweden
- Liquorice comfits
- List of confectionery brands
