= Comfit =

Type of confectionery

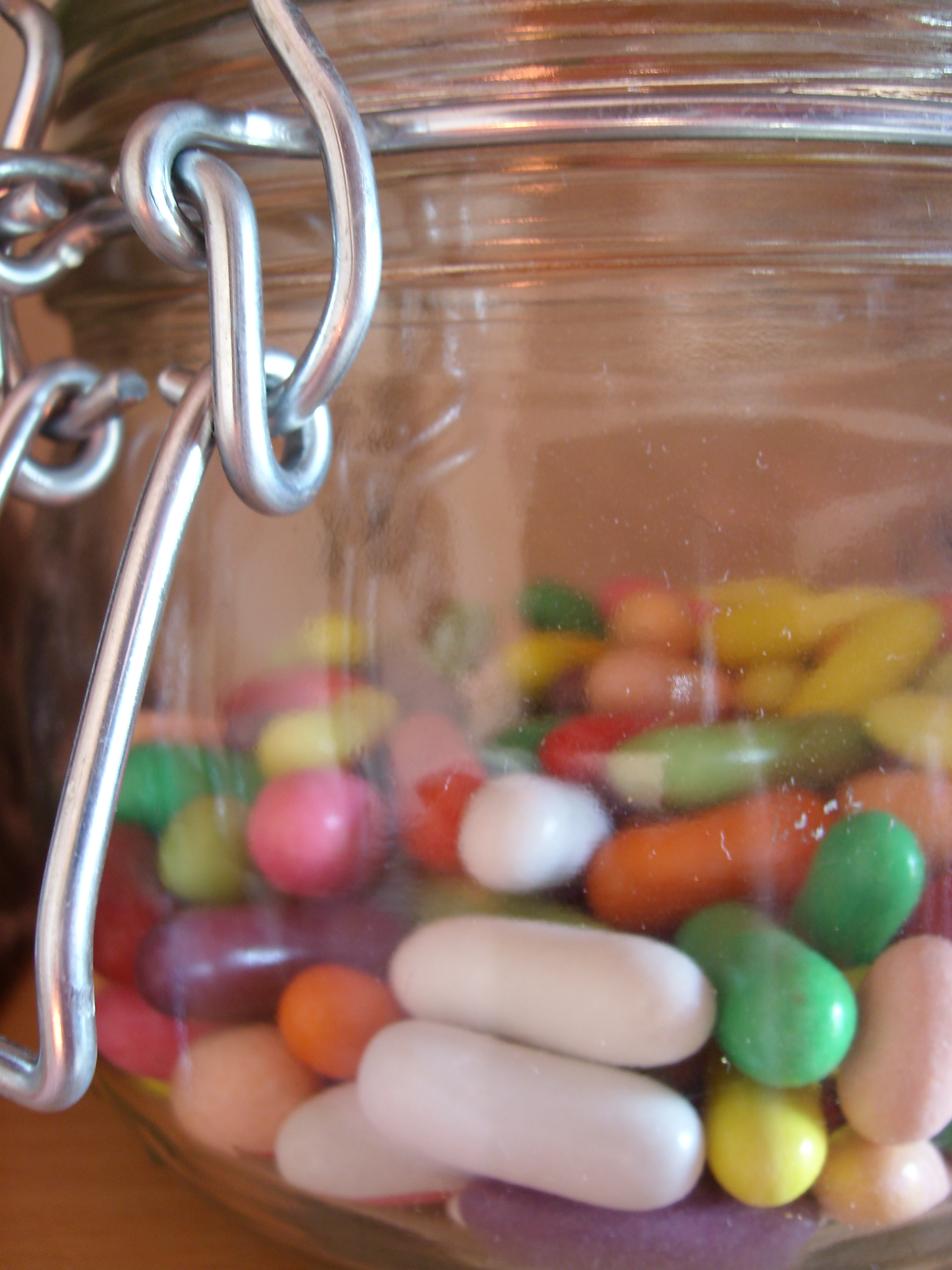
- Licorice comfits
- Type: Confectionery
- Main ingredients: Dried fruits, nuts, seeds or spices, sugar candy

Comfits are confectionery consisting of dried fruits, nuts, seeds or spices coated with sugar candy, often through sugar panning. Almond comfits (also known as sugared almonds or Jordan almonds) in a muslin bag or other decorative container are a traditional gift at baptism and wedding celebrations in many countries of Europe and the Middle East, a custom which has spread to other countries such as Australia and Puerto Rico. Licorice comfits (sometimes sold as torpedoes) are typically multi-colored, while almond comfits are usually white for weddings and may be brightly colored for other occasions.

A late medieval recipe for comfits is based on anise seeds, and suggests also making comfits with fennel, caraway, coriander, and diced ginger. These aniseed comfits seem to be a precursor of modern aniseed balls.

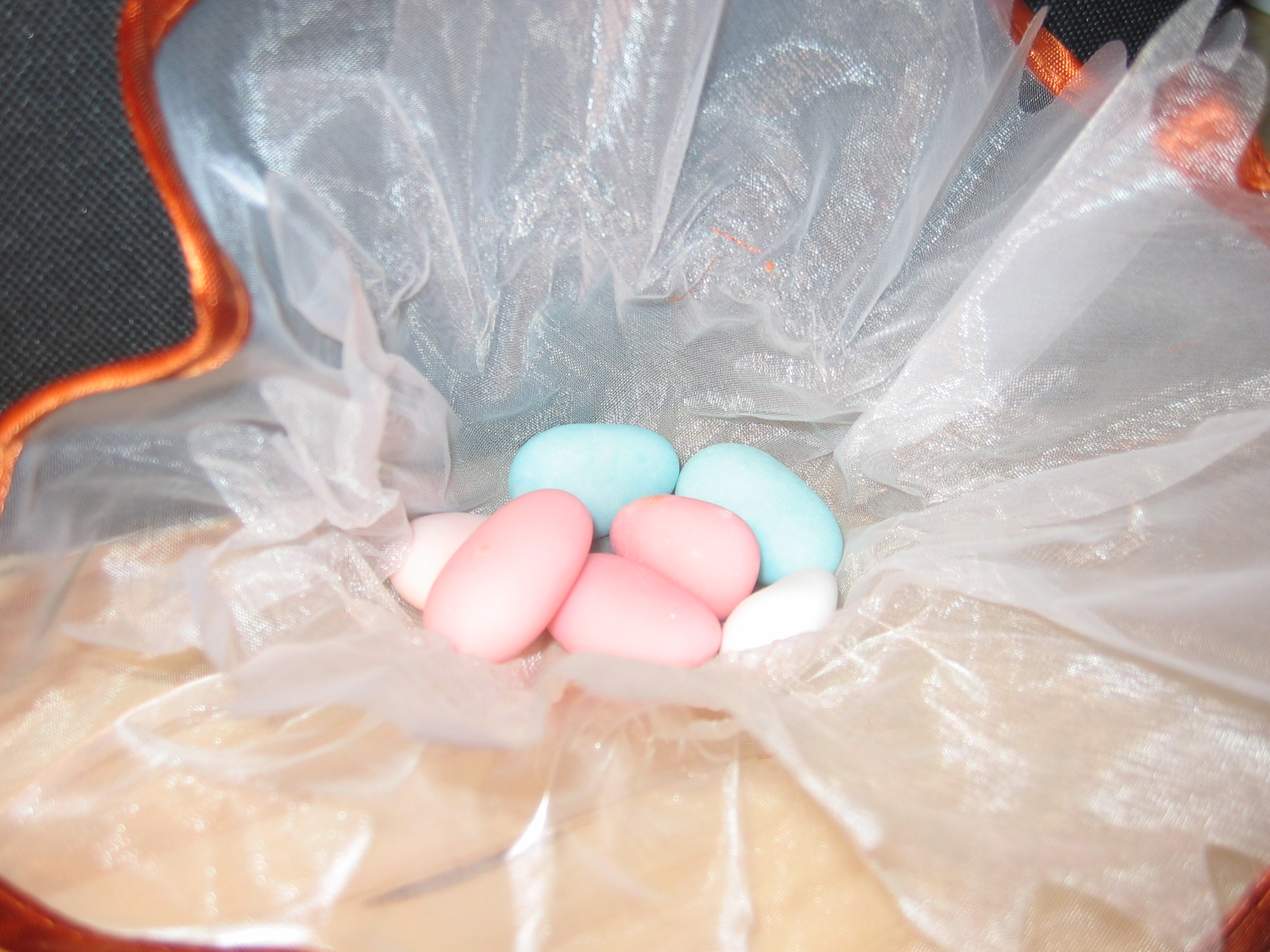
French almond comfits for a baptism

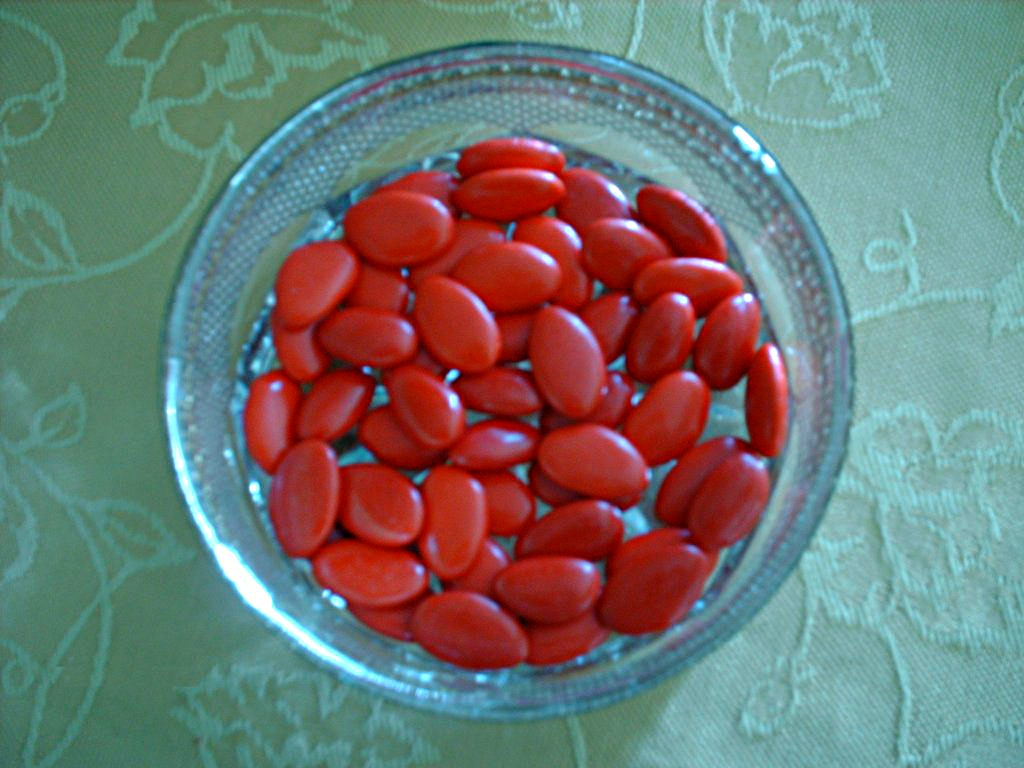
Red almond comfits, called confetti rossi, are used in Italy to celebrate the conferring of a degree.

== See also ==
- Kompeito
- Dragée
- Sugar plums
- Mukhwas
- Good & Plenty
- London drops, a similar candy sold in Finland and Sweden
- Sprinkles
- Confectionery in the English Renaissance
- List of almond dishes
- Glossary of historical culinary terms
