= London drops =

Type of liquorice confectionery

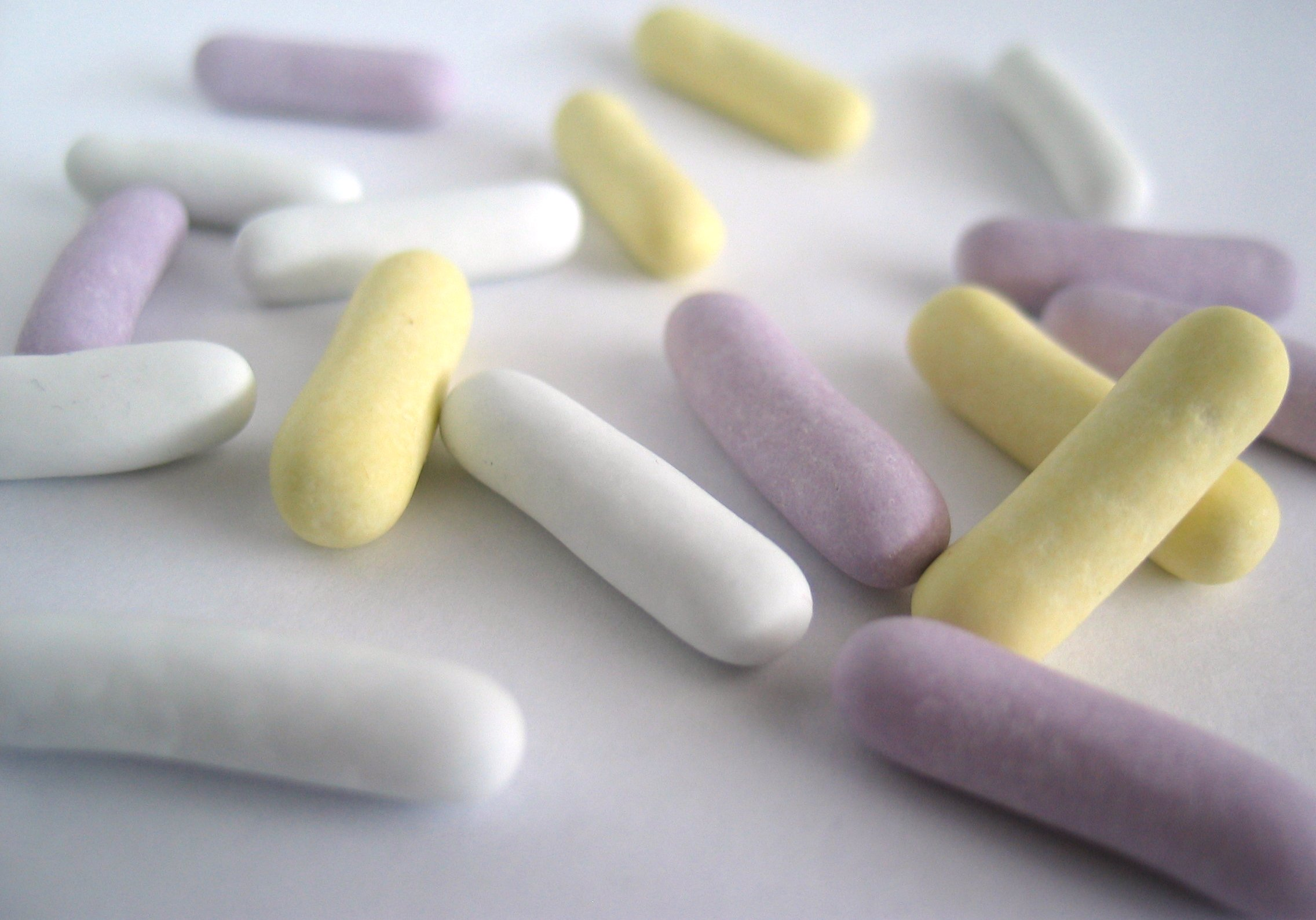
- London drops are coated in shades of pastels.
- Alternative names: Lontoo rakeet
- Type: Candy
- Place of origin: Finland
- Main ingredients: Liquorice

London drops (Lontoo rakeet in Finnish) are a type of liquorice candy sold in Finland and Sweden first by Chymos, later by Fazer.

London drops are oblong-shaped sweets about 2 cm long and 5 mm thick. They consist of a soft liquorice-flavoured core inside a hard, sugary aniseed-flavoured coating. They are coloured in pastel colours, coming in white, pale purple and pale yellow.

In the 1980s, British actor Bob Grant appeared on Finnish television in advertisement for London drops, saying the famous Finnish advertisement slogan "Niin Lontoon raetta, niin Lontoon raetta".

Good & Plenty is a similar candy available in the United States. Similar sweets are known as liquorice comfits in the United Kingdom, and a liquorice-flavoured sweet called Torpedoes made by Haribo appears to be similar.

== See also ==
- Mukhwas
- Comfit
