= Good & Fruity =

Brand of confectionery

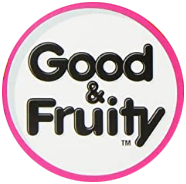
- Product type: Candy
- Produced by: The Hershey Company
- Country: U.S.
- Discontinued: 2018; 8 years ago

Good & Fruity is a multicolored, multi-flavor candy with a similar shape to Good & Plenty. Unlike Good & Plenty, Good & Fruity contains red licorice. The candy was produced by The Hershey Company.

== History ==
Before 1992, all Good & Fruity candies contained the same-flavored red gummy center, relying upon the hard candy shell to provide the different flavor according to color. Around 1992, the formula was changed, and the candies' interiors became color- and flavor-coordinated with the outer shell to give the candy a "fruitier" taste.

Good & Fruity was out of production for an extended period, but returned to the Hershey Foods lineup in March 2008. The third recipe was modified from the original and 1992 versions: the more recent recipe was closer to a jelly bean and does not contain red licorice. The name was slightly changed, originally "Good n' Fruity," with the new name containing an ampersand instead of "n." The candy also contained the following flavors: cherry, orange, lemon, lime, and blue raspberry.

In mid-2018, the candy went out of production again.

== See also ==
- List of confectionery brands
- Mike and Ike similar candy
