= Sugar plum =

Hard candy

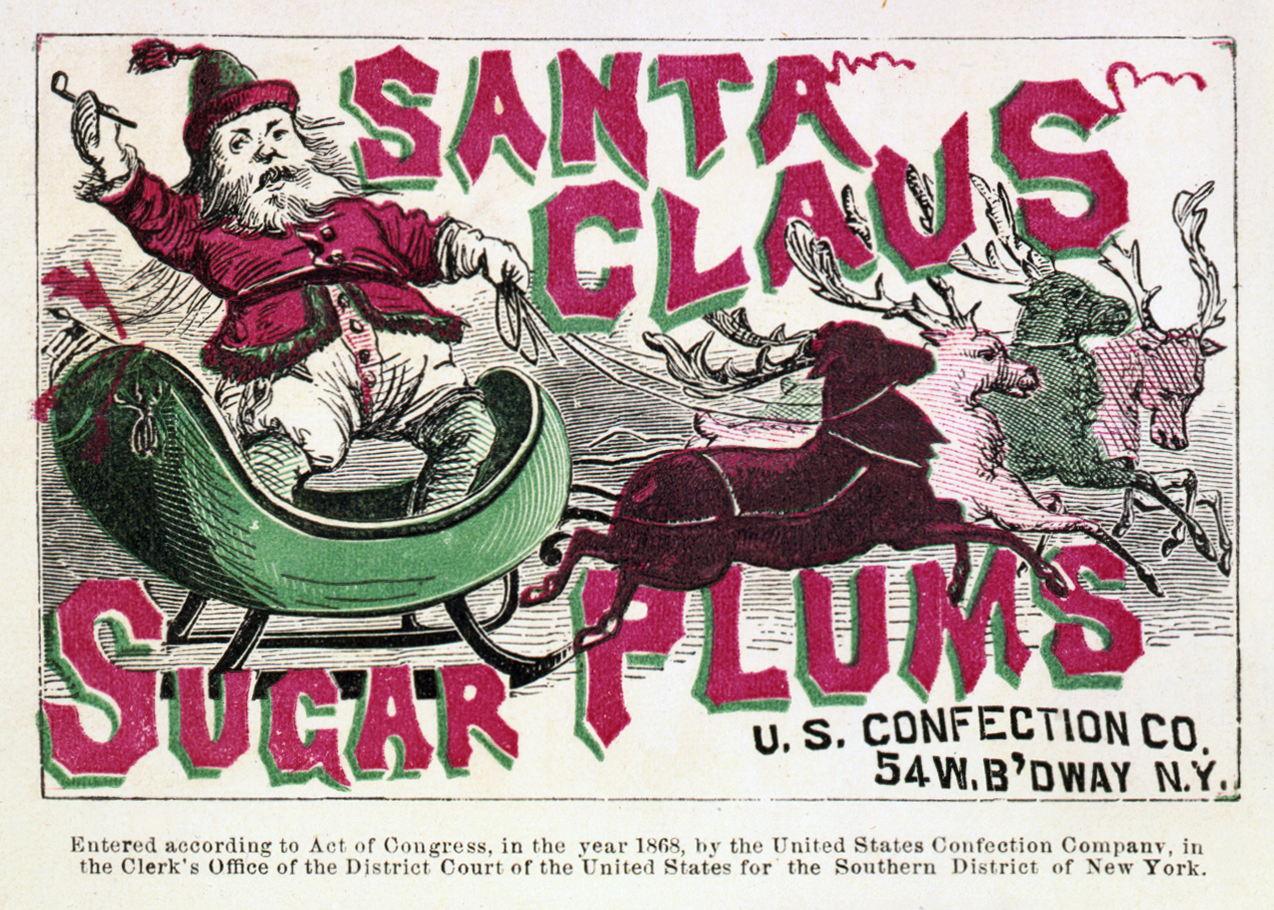
- Confection label, showing Santa Claus on sleigh with reindeer (1868)
- Type: Dragée or comfit
- Main ingredients: fruit, nuts, and sugar

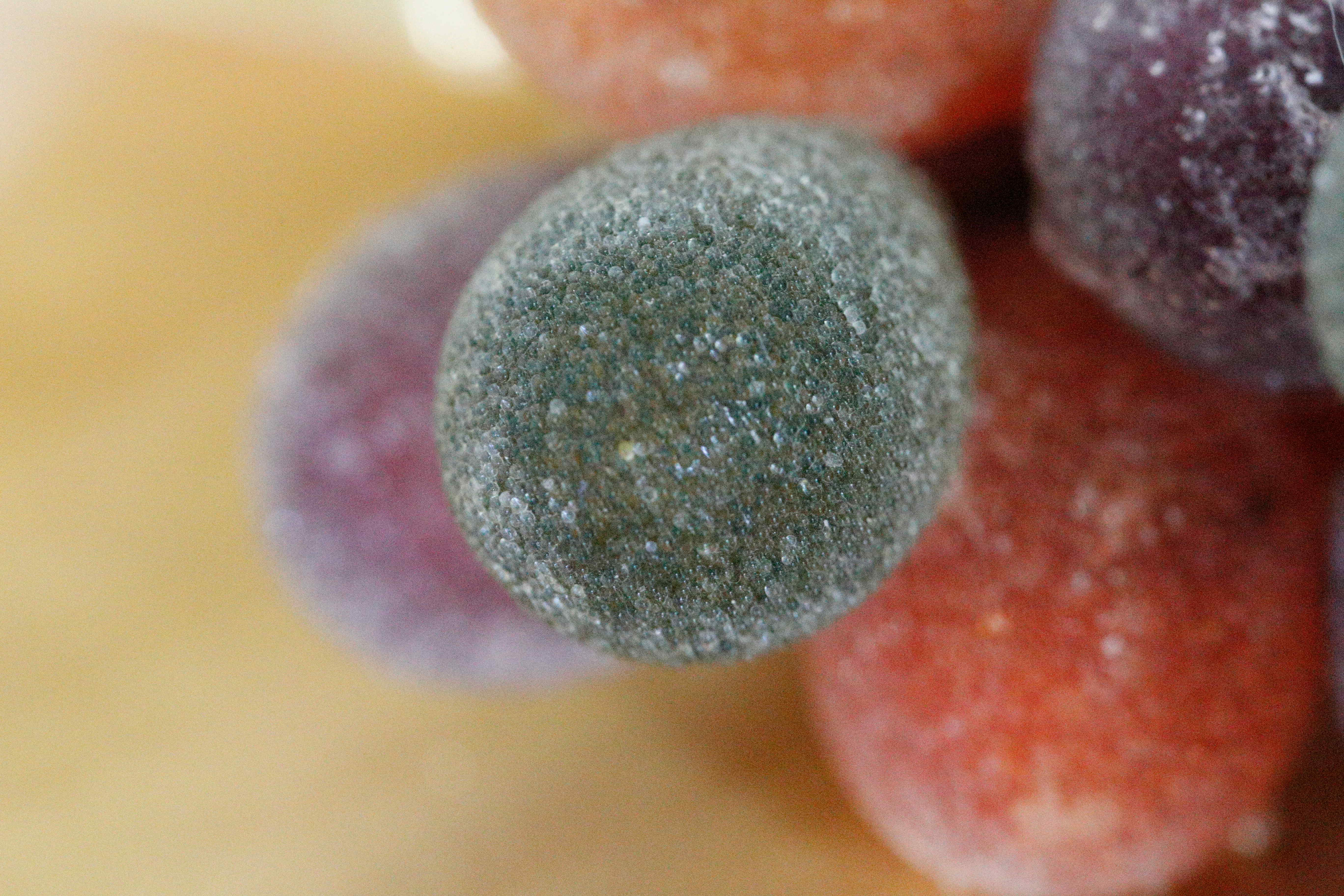
Assorted sugar plum candies

Sugar plums are a type of dragée or other hard candy made into small round or oval shapes. The plum in the name of these confections does not always mean plum in the sense of the fruit, but rather their small size and spherical or oval shape. Traditional sugar plums often contained no fruit, instead being made mostly of pure sugar. These candies were comfits, and often surrounded a seed, nut, or spice.

== History ==
The menu for Henry IV of England's 1403 wedding feast included sugar plums, which were probably fruit preserves or suckets.

A cookbook from 1609, Delights for Ladies, describes boiling fruits with sugar as "the most kindly way to preserve plums." The term sugar plum was applied to a wide variety of candied fruits, nuts, and roots by the 16th century. In this period, sugar plums were often made from unripe fruits, often still with their stones, as ripe fruits were more difficult to candy; the name sugar plum may have referred to pieces of wire inserted into the fruit for decoration and ease of handling.

The term sugar plum came into general usage in the 17th century. During that time, adding layers of sweet which give sugar plums and comfits their hard shell was done through a slow and labor-intensive process called panning. Before mechanization of the process, it often took several days, and thus the sugar plum was largely a luxury product. In fact, in the 18th century the word plum became British slang for a large pile of money or a bribe.

In his Compleat History of Drugs (1712), Pierre Pomet attributed medical benefits to sugar and provided instructions for making sweets, but dismissed sugar plums as "frivolous". By the 1860s manufacturers were using steam heat and mechanized rotating pans, and it was then available for mass consumption.

Today, some candy manufacturers have taken sugar plum literally, creating plum-flavored, plum-shaped candies and marketing them as sugar plum candy.

Another take on the original sugar plum includes a combination of dried fruits, almonds, honey, orange zest and spices. This is chopped, formed into balls, and then coated in sugar or shredded coconut.

== In popular culture ==
Sugar plums are widely associated with Christmas, through cultural phenomena such as the Sugar Plum Fairy in The Nutcracker (composed by Tchaikovsky, 1892), as well as the line, "The children were nestled all snug in their beds/While visions of sugar plums danced in their heads," from the poem A Visit from St. Nicholas (1823), better known as "'Twas the Night Before Christmas," by Clement C. Moore.

Sugar plums have also gained widespread recognition through the poem "The Sugar Plum Tree" by Eugene Field. The poem begins "Have you ever heard of the Sugar-Plum Tree? 'Tis a marvel of great renown!" Sugar Plum Fairies were a Norwegian folk and pop band formed in 2000.

== See also ==
- Sugar panning – process that sugar plum goes through
