= Aniseed ball =

Hard round sweet

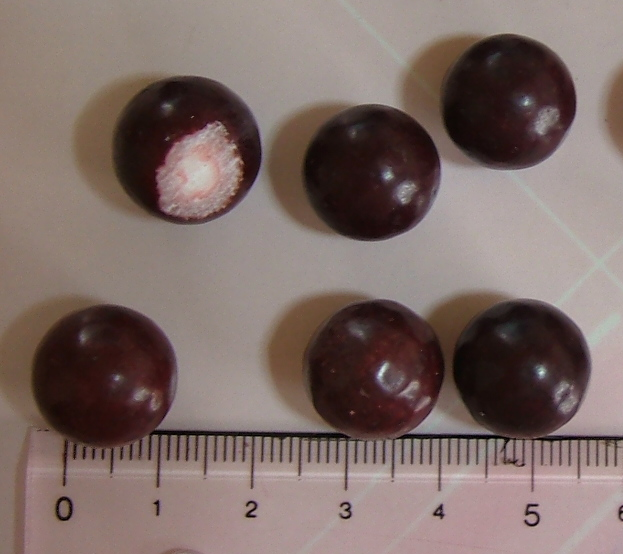
Aniseed balls with a metric ruler for scale. The top left ball shows the interior of the sweet.

Aniseed balls are a comfit type of hard round sweet sold in the United Kingdom, Ireland, Malta, South Africa, Canada, New Zealand, and Australia. They are shiny and dark reddish brown, and hard like gobstoppers, but generally only 1/2 inch (13 mm) across.

They are flavoured by aniseed oil, with a strong aniseed flavour, and last for a long time in the mouth before dissolving. In the centre of the ball is normally a whole rapeseed, which is used for forming layers of sugar around, although other nuclei such as sugar crystals are sometimes used.

== Use as a timing device ==
In the spring of 1939, a magnetically attached limpet mine was constructed in Britain for underwater sabotage actions in the upcoming war. The mines exploded when a cocked spring hit a detonator. Between the striker and the detonator an aniseed ball was placed, as each had precisely the same spherical shape and consistently dissolved in water after 35 minutes, leaving the saboteur time to escape. The first of these mines was sent to Yugoslavia and Egypt in the autumn of 1939.
