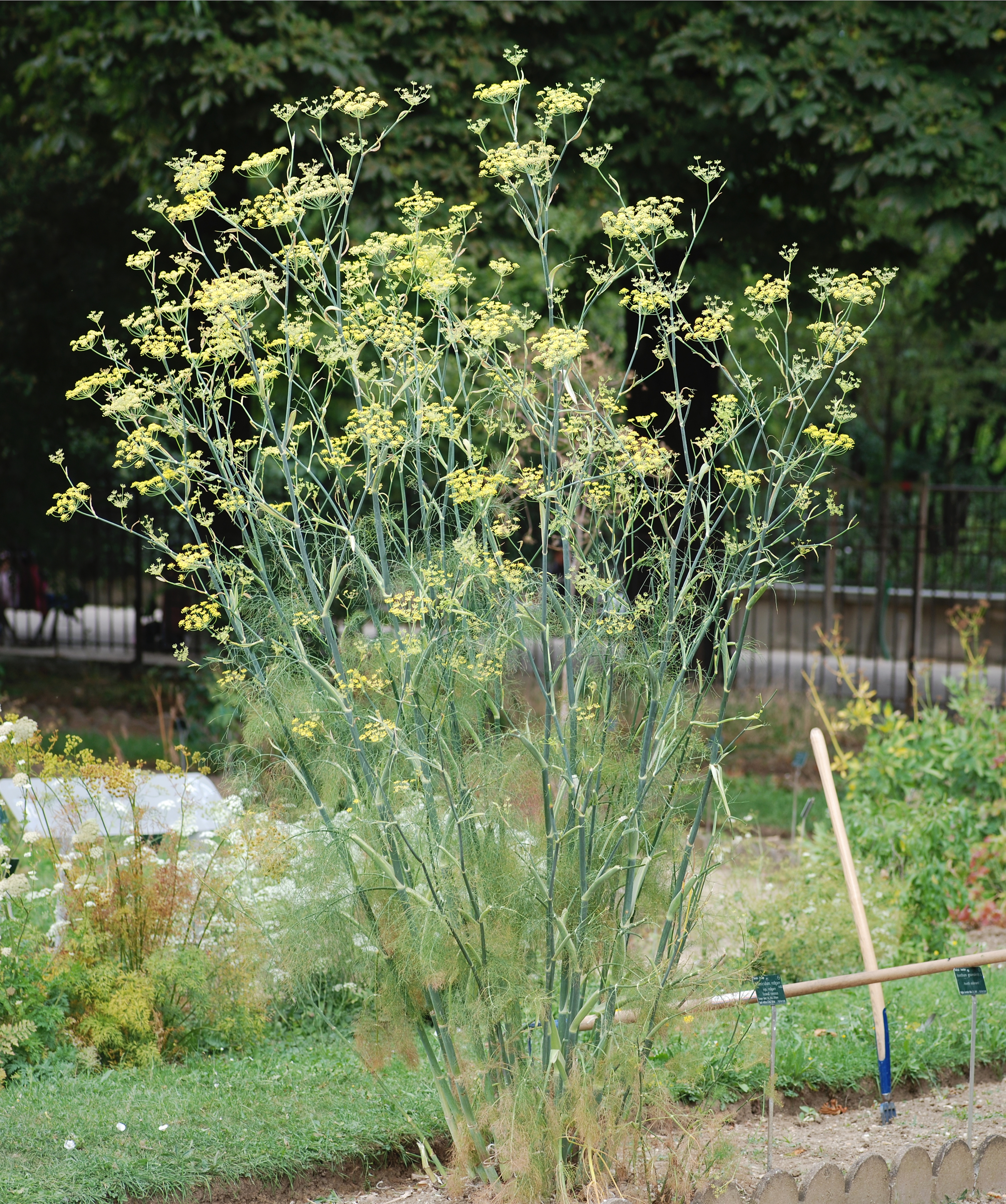
- Fennel in flower

Scientific classification
- Kingdom: Plantae
- Clade: Tracheophytes
- Clade: Angiosperms
- Clade: Eudicots
- Clade: Asterids
- Order: Apiales
- Family: Apiaceae
- Genus: Foeniculum
- Species: F. vulgare

Binomial name
- Foeniculum vulgare Mill.

Synonyms
- List: Anethum dulce DC.; Anethum foeniculum L.; Anethum minus Gouan; Anethum panmori Roxb.; Anethum panmorium Roxb. ex Fleming; Anethum piperitum Ucria; Anethum rupestre Salisb.; Foeniculum azoricum Mill.; Foeniculum capillaceum Gilib.; Foeniculum divaricatum Griseb.; Foeniculum dulce Mill.; Foeniculum foeniculum (L.) H.Karst.; Foeniculum giganteum Lojac.; Foeniculum officinale All.; Foeniculum panmorium (Roxb.) DC.; Foeniculum piperitum C.Presl; Foeniculum rigidum Brot. ex Steud.; Ligusticum foeniculum (L.) Roth; Ligusticum foeniculum (L.) Crantz; Meum foeniculum (L.) Spreng.; Meum piperitum Schult.; Ozodia foeniculacea Wight & Arn.; Selinum foeniculum E.H.L.Krause; Seseli dulce Koso-Pol.; Seseli foeniculum Koso-Pol.; Seseli piperitum Koso-Pol.; Tenoria romana Schkuhr ex Spreng.

= Fennel =

Flowering plant species in the carrot family

Fennel (Foeniculum vulgare) is a flowering plant species in the carrot family. It is a hardy, perennial herb with yellow flowers and feathery leaves. It is indigenous to the shores of the Mediterranean but has become widely naturalized in many parts of the world, especially on dry soils near the sea coast and on riverbanks.

It is a highly flavorful herb used in cooking and, along with the similar-tasting anise, is one of the primary ingredients of absinthe. Florence fennel or finocchio (UK: /fɪˈnɒkioʊ/, US: /-ˈnoʊk-/, Italian: [fiˈnɔkkjo]) is a selection with a swollen, bulb-like stem base (sometimes called bulb fennel) that is used as a vegetable.

== Description ==
Foeniculum vulgare is a perennial herb. The stem is hollow, erect, and glaucous green, and it can grow up to 2.1 meters (7 feet) tall. The leaves grow up to 40 centimeters (16 inches) long; they are finely dissected, with the ultimate segments filiform (threadlike), about 0.5 millimeters (1/64 in) wide. Its leaves are similar to those of dill, but thinner.

The flowers are produced in terminal compound umbels 5–17.5 cm (2–7 in) wide, each umbel section having 20–50 tiny yellow flowers on short pedicels. The fruit is a dry schizocarp from 4–10 mm (3/16–3/8 in) long, half as wide or less, and grooved.

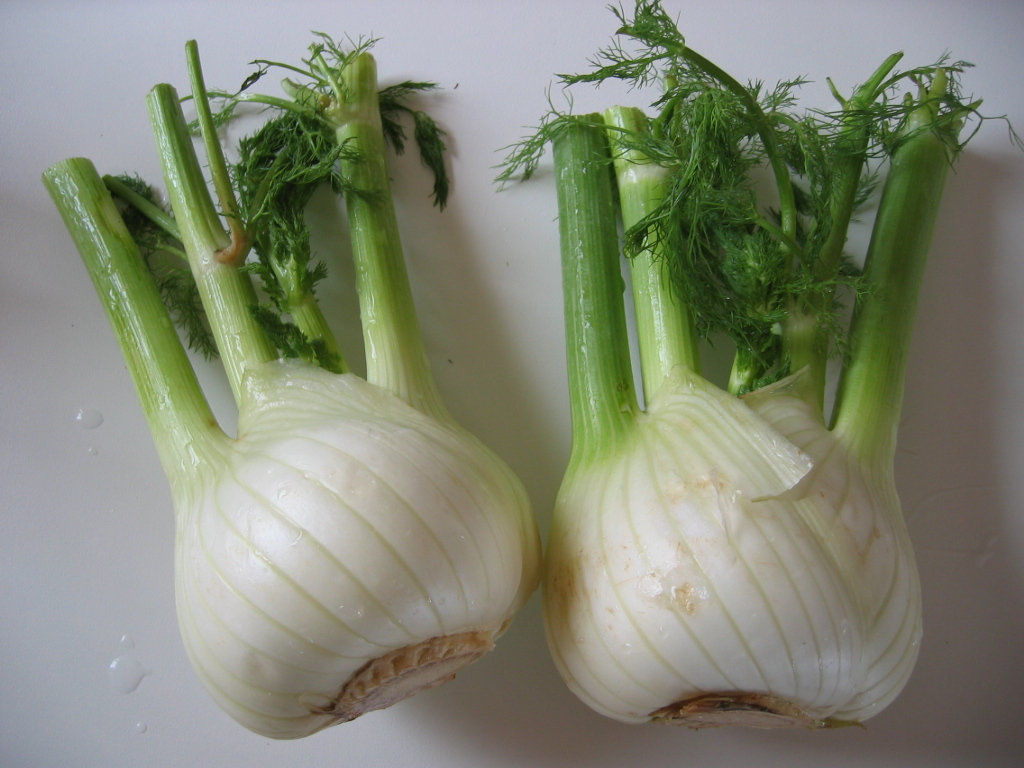
Florence fennel bulbs

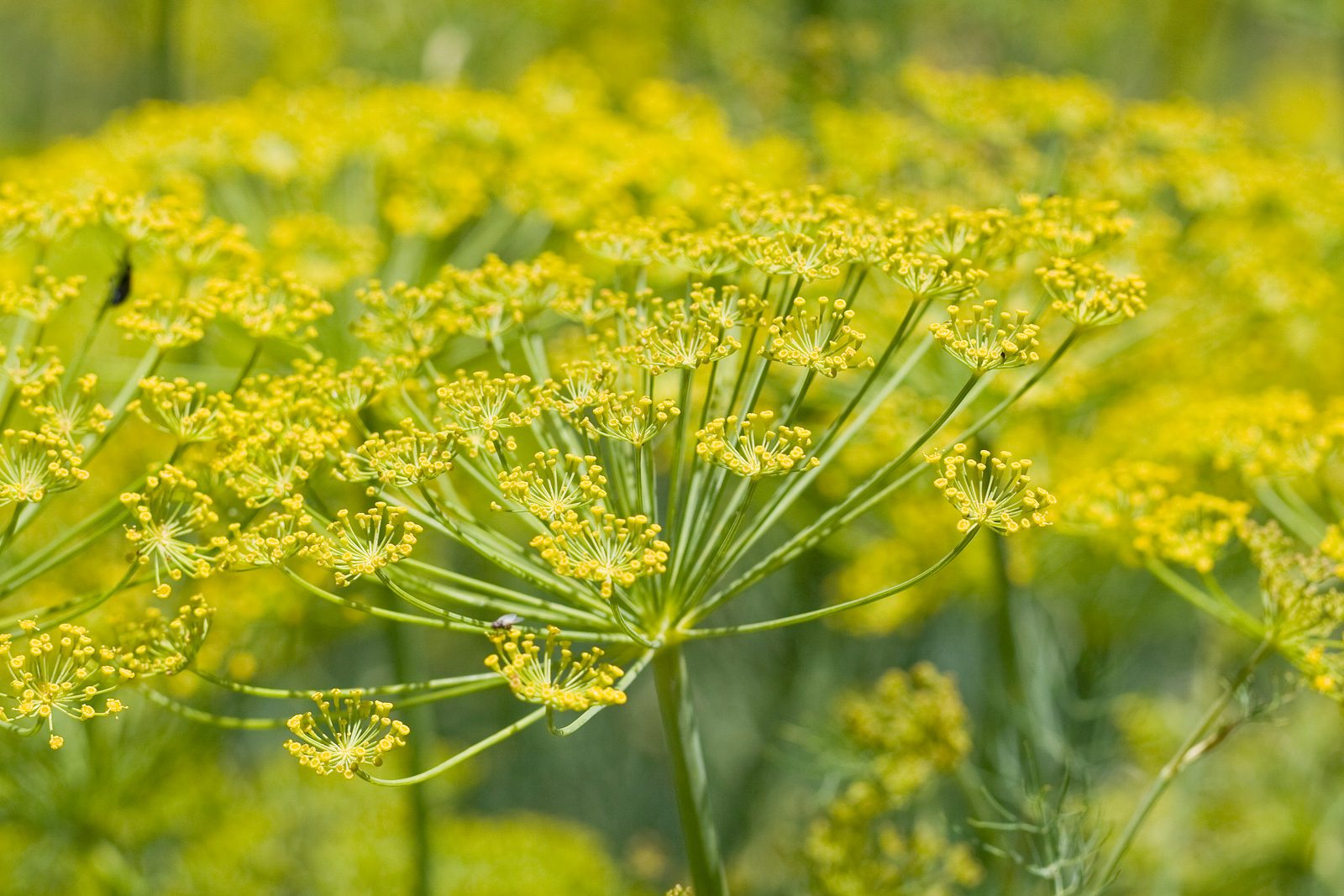
Flower heads

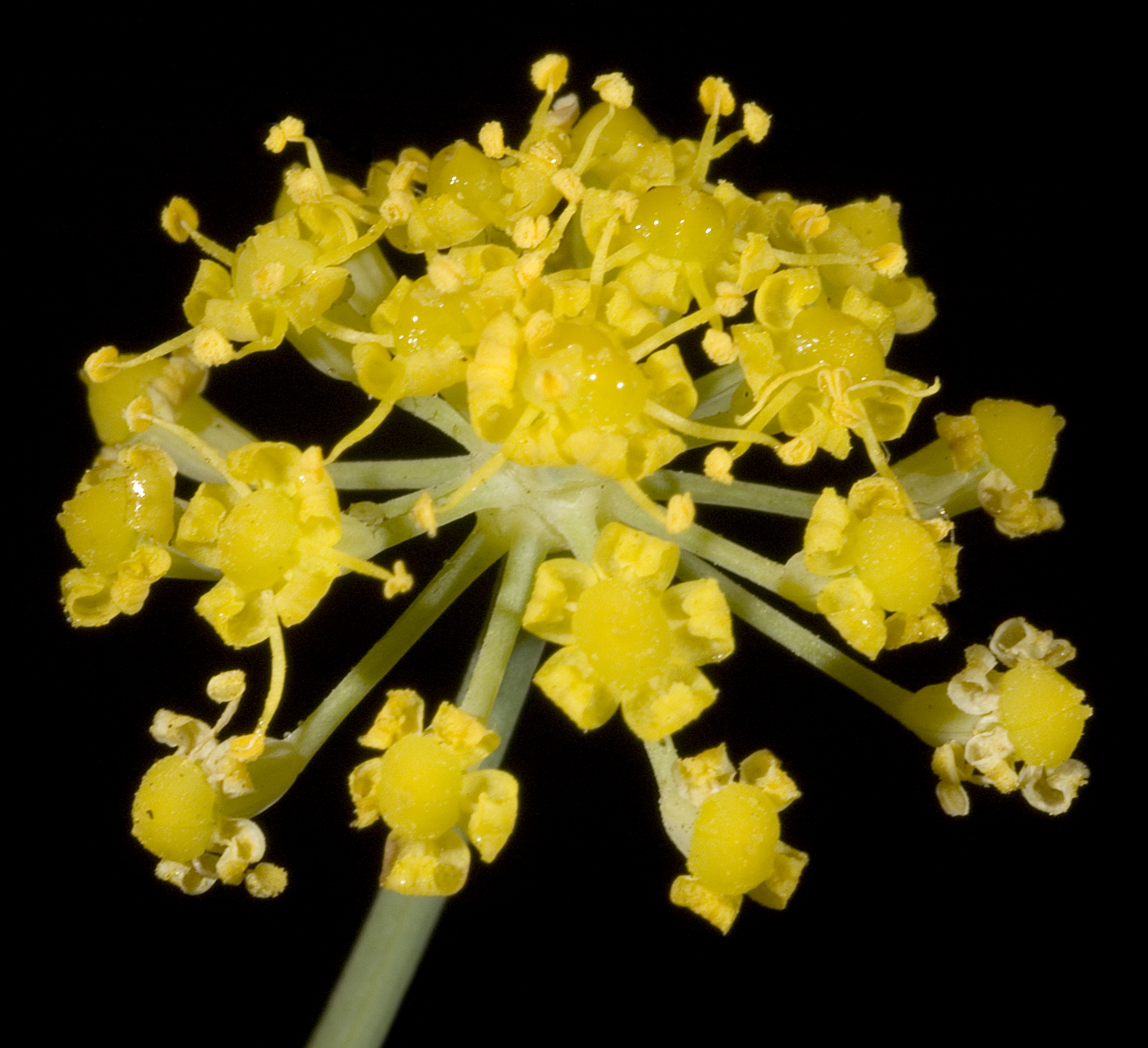
Umbel

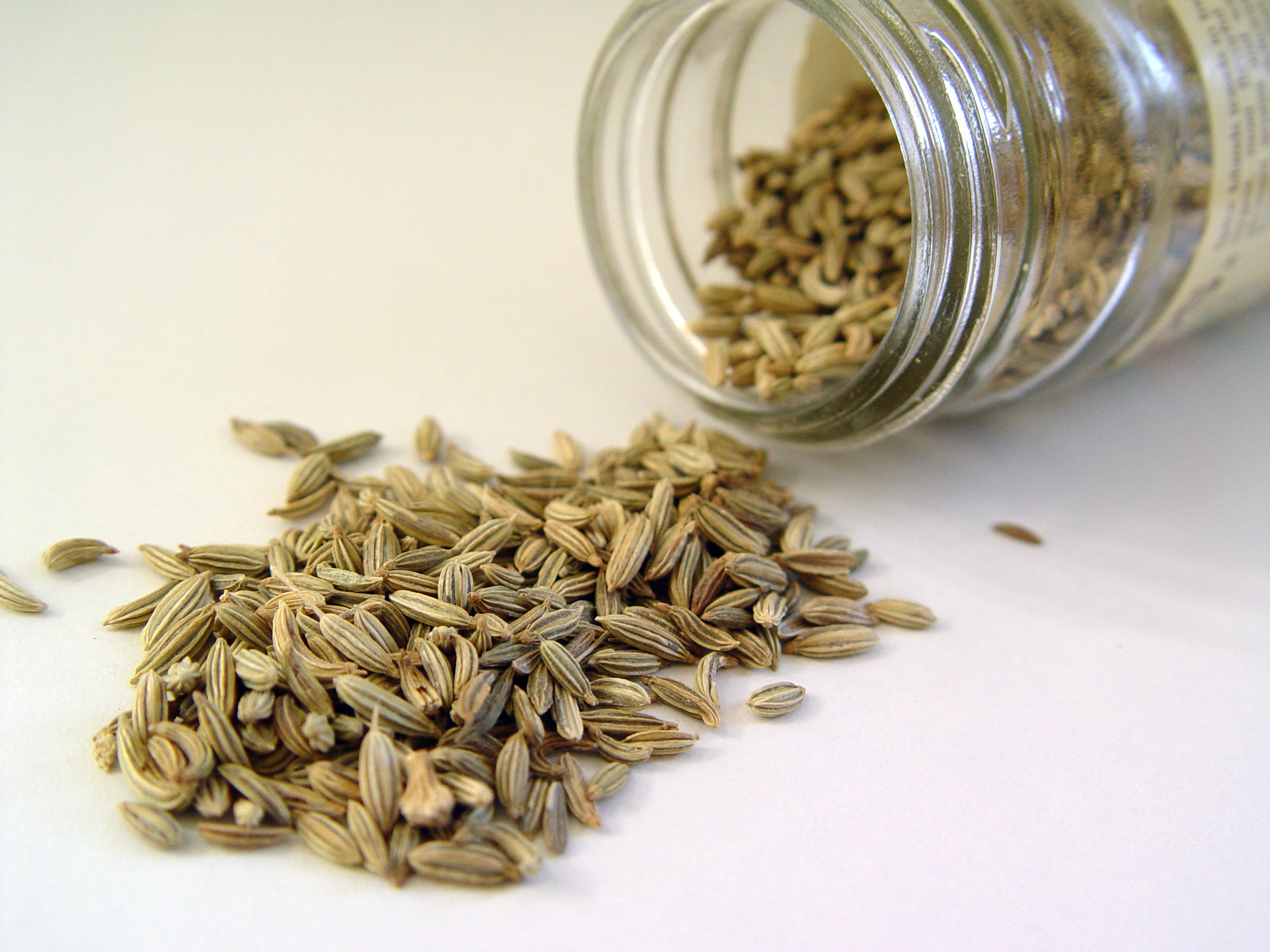
Fruits

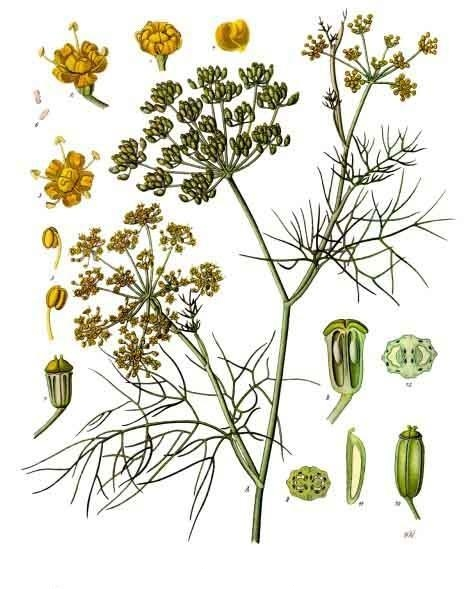
In Köhler's Medicinal Plants (1887)

=== Chemistry ===
The aromatic character of fennel fruits derives from volatile oils imparting mixed aromas, including trans-anethole and estragole (resembling licorice), fenchone (mint and camphor), limonene, 1-octen-3-ol (mushroom). Other phytochemicals found in fennel fruits include polyphenols, such as rosmarinic acid and luteolin, among others in minor content.

=== Similar species ===
Some plants in the Apiaceae family are poisonous and often difficult to identify.

Dill, coriander, ajwain, and caraway are similar-looking herbs but shorter-growing than fennel, reaching only 40–60 cm (16–24 in). Dill has thread-like, feathery leaves and yellow flowers; coriander and caraway have white flowers and finely divided leaves (though not as fine as dill or fennel) and are also shorter-lived (being annual or biennial plants). The superficial similarity in appearance between these seeds may have led to a sharing of names and etymology, as in the case of meridian fennel, a term for caraway.

Giant fennel (Ferula communis) is a large, coarse plant with a pungent aroma, which grows wild in the Mediterranean region and is only occasionally grown in gardens elsewhere. Other Ferula species are also called giant fennel, but are not culinary herbs.

In North America, fennel may be found growing in the same habitat and alongside native osha (Ligusticum porteri) and Lomatium species, useful medicinal relatives in the parsley family.

Most Lomatium species have yellow flowers like fennel, but some are white-flowered and resemble poison hemlock. Lomatium is an important historical food plant of Native Americans known as 'biscuit root'. Most Lomatium spp. have finely divided, hairlike leaves; their roots have a delicate rice-like odor, unlike the musty odor of hemlock. Lomatium species prefer dry, rocky soils devoid of organic material.

== Etymology ==
Fennel came into Old English from Old French fenoil which in turn came from Latin faeniculum, a diminutive of faenum, meaning "hay".

== Cultivation ==
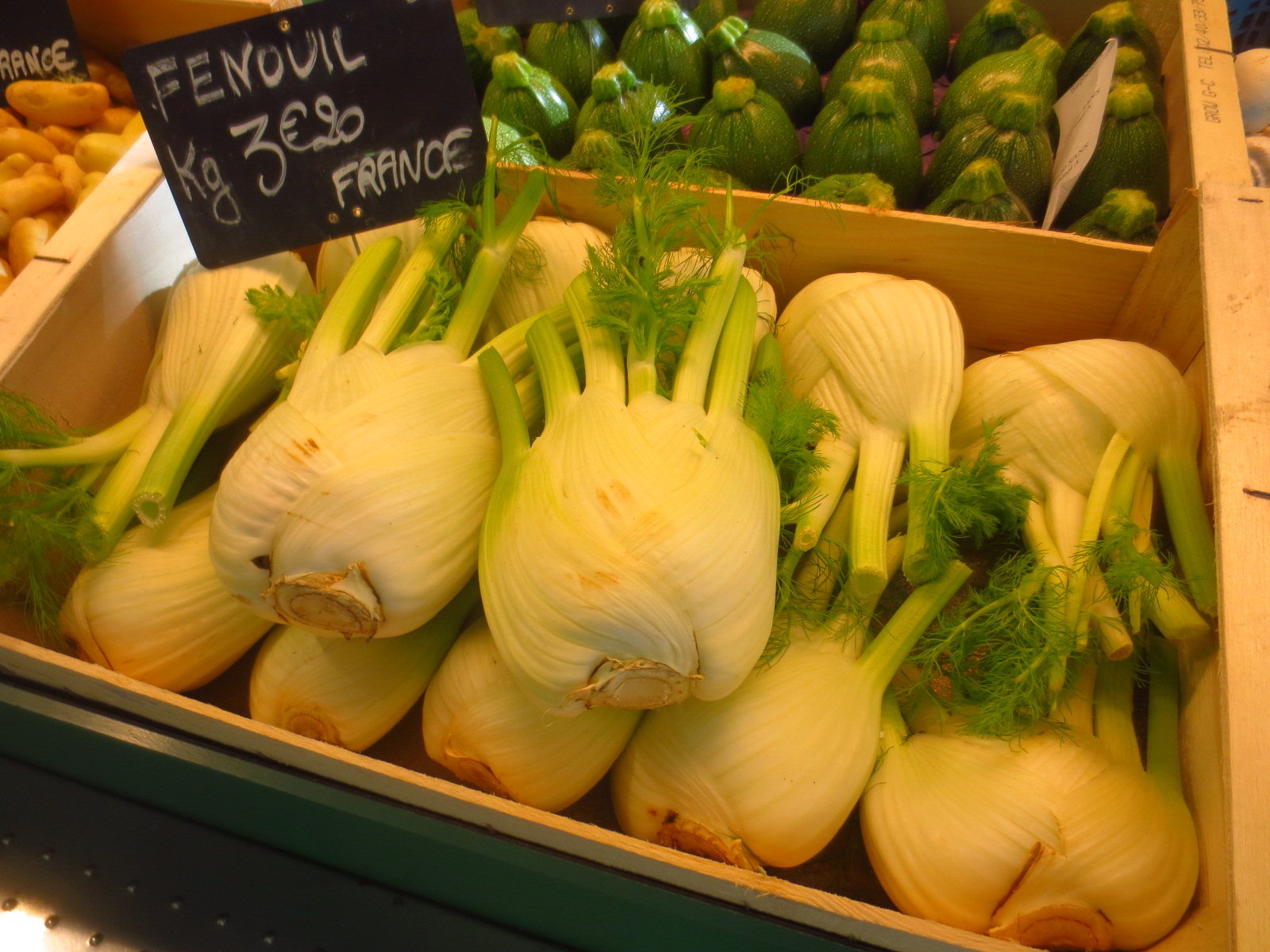
Fennel for sale in a French market

Fennel is widely cultivated, both in its native range and elsewhere, for its edible, strongly flavored leaves and fruits. Its aniseed or licorice flavor comes from anethole, an aromatic compound also found in anise and star anise, and its taste and aroma are similar to theirs, though usually not as strong.

Florence fennel (Foeniculum vulgare Azoricum Group; syn. F. vulgare var. azoricum) is a cultivar group with inflated leaf bases which form a bulb-like structure. It is of cultivated origin, and has a mild anise-like flavor but is sweeter and more aromatic. Florence fennel plants are smaller than the wild type. Several cultivars of Florence fennel are also known by several other names, notably the Italian name finocchio. In North American supermarkets, it is often mislabeled as "anise."

Foeniculum vulgare 'Purpureum' or 'Nigra', "bronze-leaved" fennel, is widely available as a decorative garden plant.

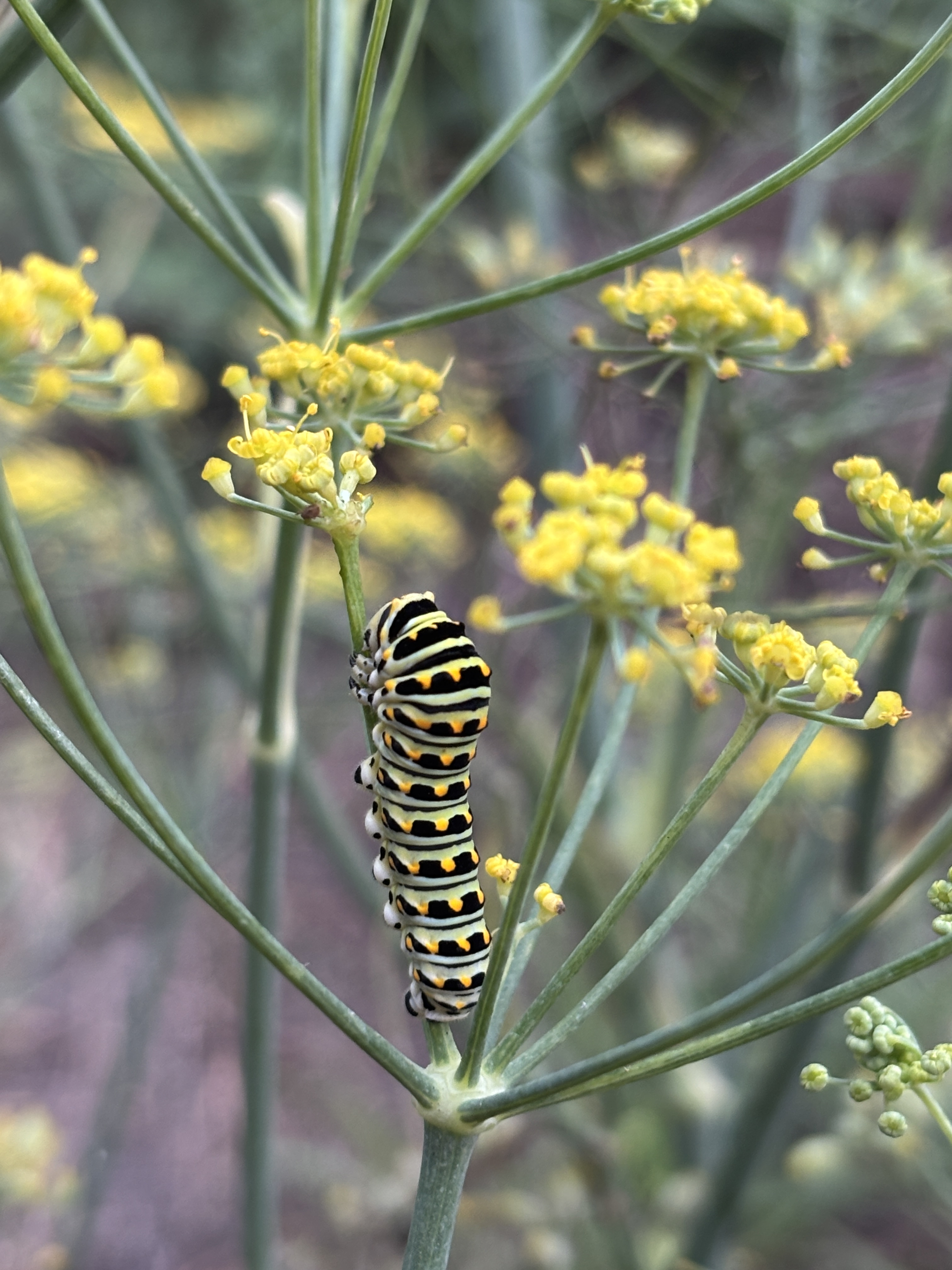
Anise swallowtail caterpillar on naturalized fennel in southern California; as an umbellifer, the fennel plant has relatively high value for microfauna

Fennel has become naturalized along roadsides, in pastures, and in other open sites in many regions, including northern Europe, the United States, southern Canada, and much of Asia and Australia. It propagates well by both root crown and seed and is considered an invasive species and a weed in Australia and the U.S. It can drastically alter the composition and structure of many plant communities, including grasslands, coastal scrub, riparian, and wetland communities. It appears to do this by outcompeting native species for light, nutrients, and water and perhaps by exuding allelopathic substances that inhibit the growth of other plants. In western North America, fennel can be found from the coastal and inland wildland–urban interface east into hill and mountain areas, excluding desert habitats. On Santa Cruz Island, California for example, fennel has achieved 50 to 90% absolute cover.

=== Production ===
As grouped by the United Nations Food and Agriculture Organization, production data for fennel are combined with similar spices – anise, star anise, and coriander. In 2014, India produced 60% of the world output of fennel, with China and Bulgaria as leading secondary producers.

Production of fennel – 2014
Country	Production (tonnes)
India	584,000
China	48,002
Bulgaria	36,500
Iran	32,771
Mexico	29,251
Syria	27,668
World	970,404
Data combined with related spices – anise, star anise & coriander. Source: FAOSTAT of the United Nations

== Uses ==
=== Nutrition ===
Fennel fruits ("seeds")
Nutritional value per 100 g (3.5 oz)
- Energy: 1,443 kJ (345 kcal)
- Carbohydrates: 52 g
- Dietary fiber: 40 g
- Fat: 14.9 g
- Saturated: 0.5 g
- Monounsaturated: 9.9 g
- Polyunsaturated: 1.7 g
- Protein: 15.8 g
Vitamins and minerals
Vitamins	Quantity %DV^{†}
Thiamine (B1)	34% 0.41 mg
Riboflavin (B2)	27% 0.35 mg
Niacin (B3)	38% 6.1 mg
Vitamin B6	28% 0.47 mg
Vitamin C	23% 21 mg
Minerals	Quantity %DV^{†}
Calcium	92% 1196 mg
Iron	103% 18.5 mg
Magnesium	92% 385 mg
Manganese	283% 6.5 mg
Phosphorus	39% 487 mg
Potassium	56% 1694 mg
Sodium	4% 88 mg
Zinc	36% 4 mg
- Other constituents: Quantity
- Water: 8.8 g
- Link to Full USDA Database entry
- ^{†}Percentages estimated using US recommendations for adults, except for potassium, which is estimated based on expert recommendation from the National Academies.

A raw fennel bulb is 90% water, 1% protein, 7% carbohydrates, and contains negligible fat.

Dried fennel seeds are typically used as a spice in minute quantities. A reference amount of 100 grams (3.5 oz) of fennel seeds provides 1,440 kilojoules (345 kilocalories) of food energy and is a rich source (20% or more of the Daily Value, DV) of protein, dietary fiber, B vitamins and several dietary minerals, especially calcium, iron, magnesium and manganese, all of which exceed 90% DV. Fennel seeds are 52% carbohydrates (including 40% dietary fiber), 15% fat, 16% protein, and 9% water.

=== Culinary ===
The bulb, foliage, and fruits of the fennel plant are used in many of the culinary traditions of the world. The small flowers of wild fennel (known as fennel "pollen") are the most potent form of fennel, but also the most expensive. Dried fennel fruit is an aromatic, anise-flavored spice, brown or green when fresh, slowly turning a dull grey as the fruit ages. For cooking, green fruits are optimal. The leaves are delicately flavored and similar in shape to dill. The bulb is a crisp vegetable that can be sautéed, stewed, braised, grilled, roasted or eaten raw. Tender young leaves are used for garnishes, as a salad, to add flavor to salads, to flavor sauces to be served with puddings, and in soups and fish sauce. Both the inflated leaf bases and the tender young shoots can be eaten like celery.

Fennel fruits are sometimes confused with those of anise, which are similar in taste and appearance, though smaller. Fennel is also a flavoring in some natural toothpastes. The fruits are used in cookery and sweet desserts.

Many cultures in South Asia, Afghanistan, and West Asia use fennel fruits in cooking. In many parts of India, fennel fruits; called saunf, are consumed raw or roasted as mukhwas; an after-meal digestive and breath freshener or candied as comfit. In Iraq, fennel seeds are used as an ingredient in nigella-flavored breads. It is one of the most important spices in Kashmiri cuisine and Gujarati cooking. In Indian cuisine, whole fennel seeds and fennel powder are used as a spice in various sweet and savory dishes. It is an essential ingredient in the Assamese/Bengali/Oriya spice mixture panch phoron and in Chinese five-spice powders. Fennel seeds are also often used as an ingredient in paan, a breath freshener most popularly consumed in India. In China, fennel stem and leaves are often ingredients in the stuffings of jiaozi, baozi, or pies, as well in cold dishes as a green vegetable. Fennel fruits are present in well-known mixed spices such as the five-spice powder or thirteen-spice powder.

Fennel leaves are used in some parts of India as leafy green vegetables either by themselves or mixed with other vegetables, cooked to be served and consumed as part of a meal. In Syria and Lebanon, the young leaves are used to make a special kind of egg omelette (along with onions and flour) called ijjeh.

Many egg, fish, and other dishes employ fresh or dried fennel leaves. Florence fennel is a key ingredient in some Italian salads, or it can be braised and served as a warm side dish. It may be blanched or marinated, or cooked in risotto.

Fennel fruits are the primary flavor component in Italian sausage. In Spain, the stems of the fennel plant are used in the preparation of pickled eggplants, berenjenas de Almagro. A herbal tea or tisane can also be made from fennel.

On account of its aromatic properties, fennel fruit forms one of the ingredients of the compound licorice powder.

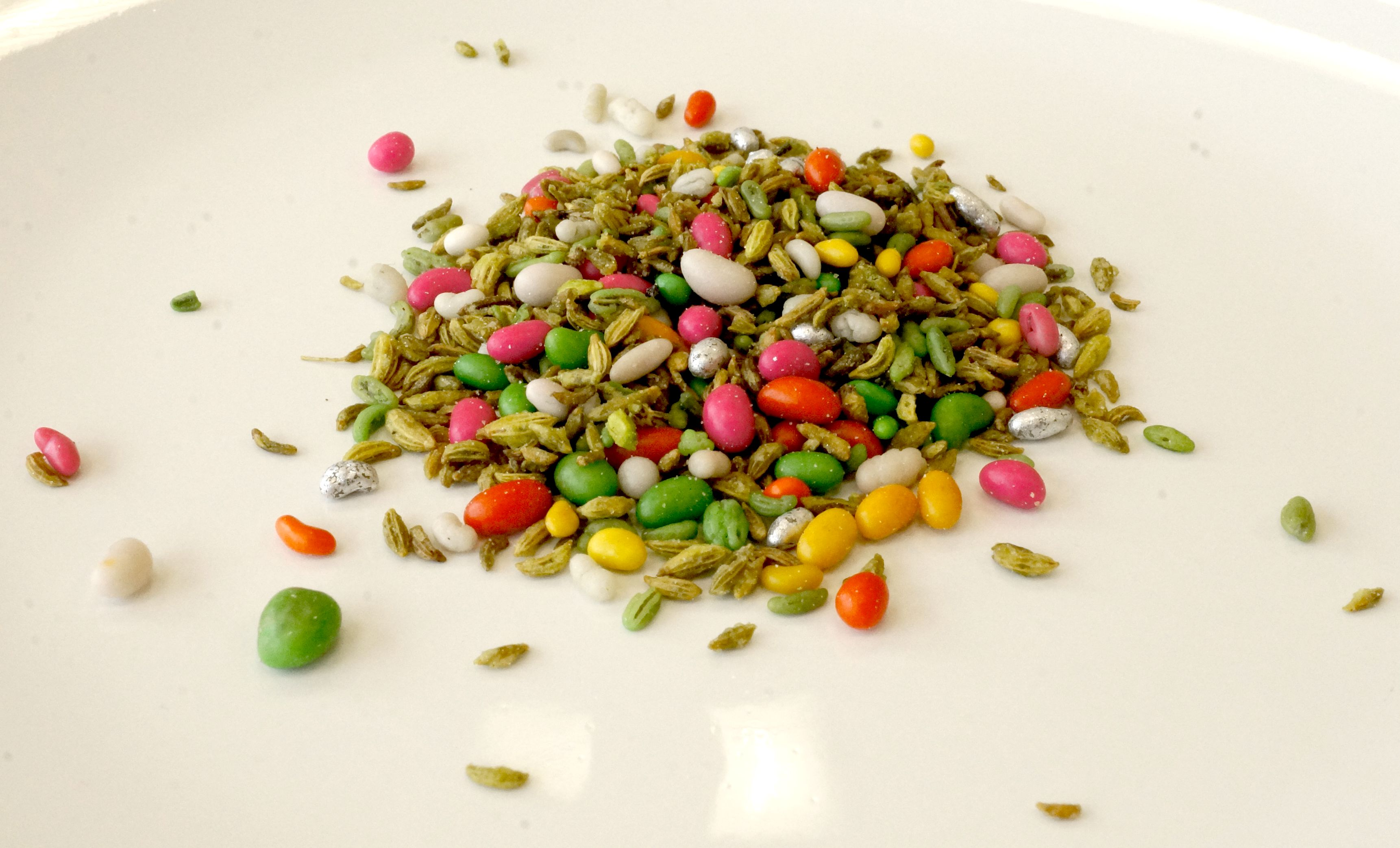
Sugar-coated and uncoated fennel fruits used as a breath freshener

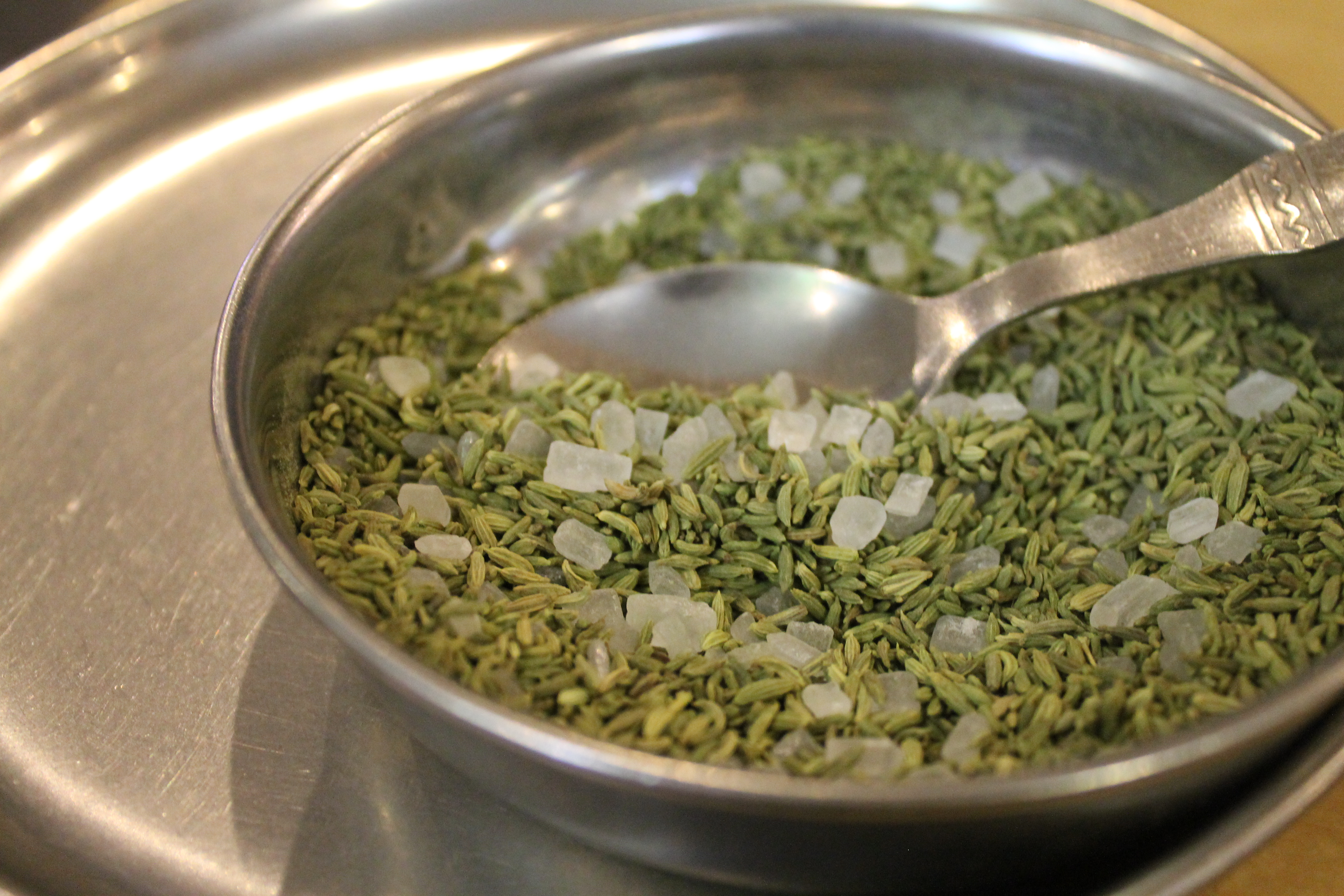
Indian mukhwas (breath freshener) made of fennel seeds and rock sugar

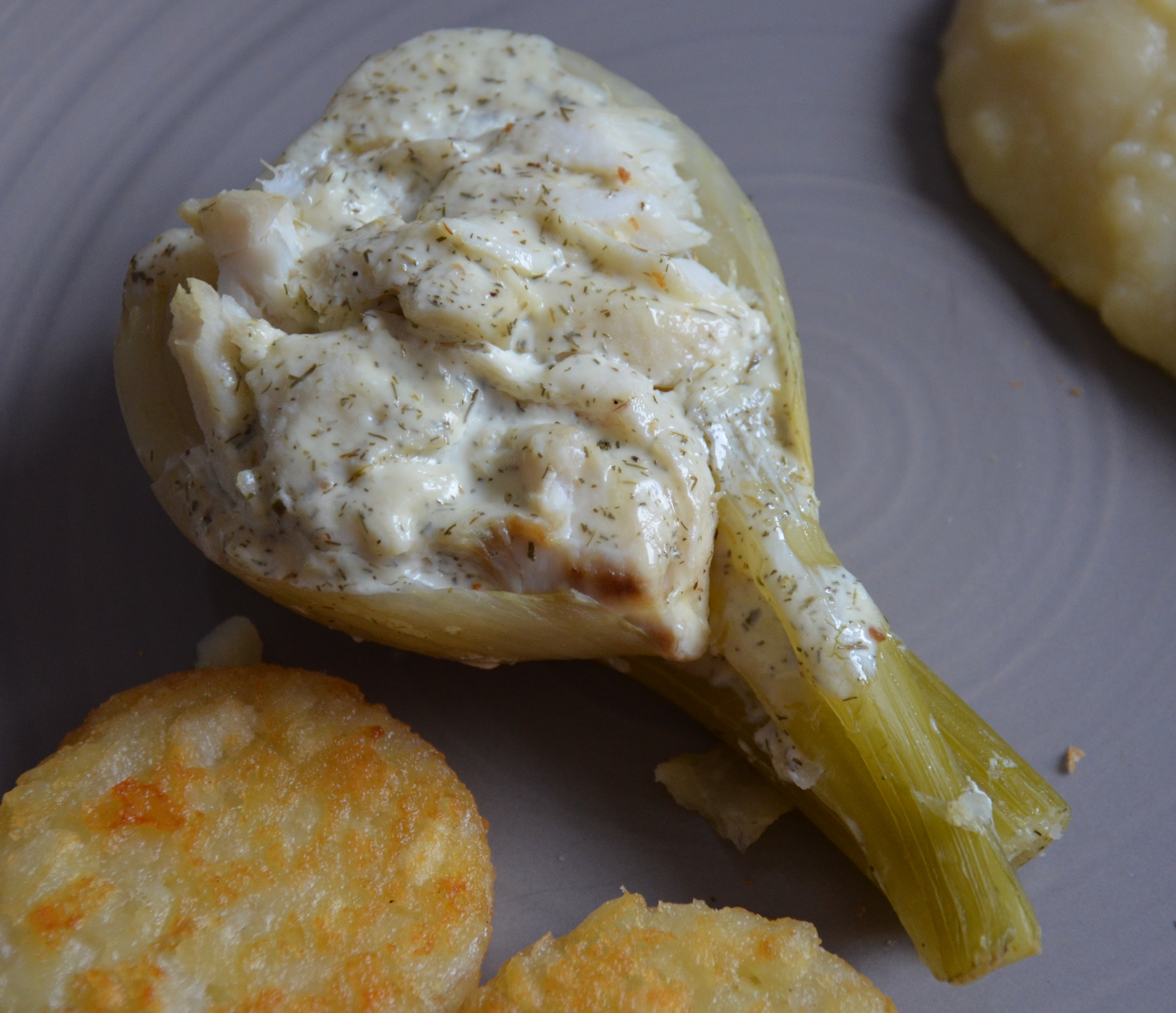
French cooked fennel stuffed with cod and dill cream

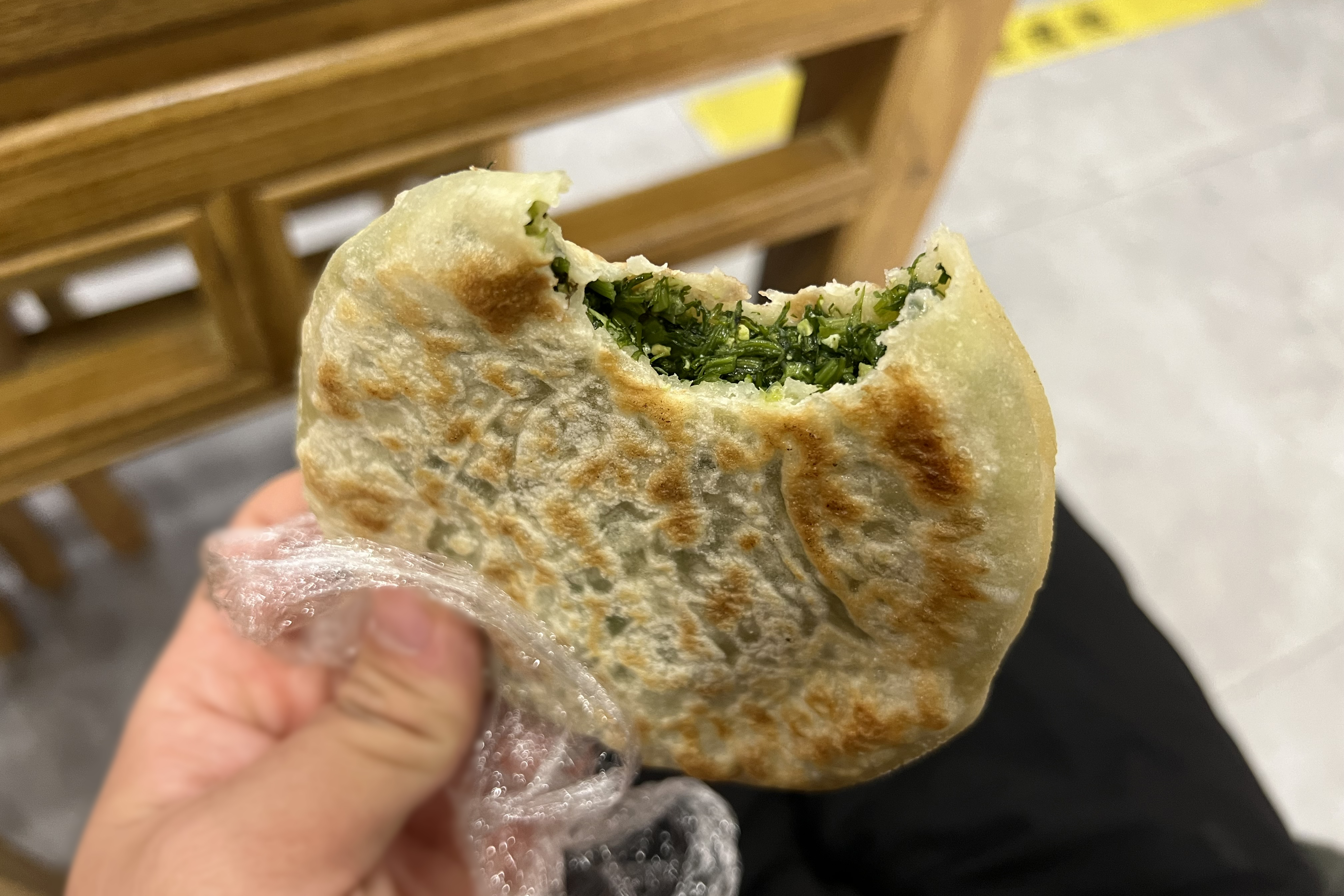
Chinese bing with fennel filling

=== Other uses ===
Fennel was prized by the ancient Greeks and Romans, who used it as medicine, food, and insect repellent. Fennel tea was believed to give courage to warriors before battle. Emperor Charlemagne required the cultivation of fennel on all imperial farms.

Florence fennel is one of the three main herbs used in the preparation of absinthe, an alcoholic mixture which originated as a medicinal elixir in Europe and became, by the late 19th century, a popular alcoholic drink in France and other countries. Fennel fruit is a common and traditional spice in flavored Scandinavian brännvin (a loosely defined group of distilled spirits, which include akvavit). Fennel is also featured in the 16th-century Chinese Materia Medica for its use in traditional medicine.

A 2016 study found F. vulgare essential oil to have insecticidal properties.

== In culture ==
The Greek name for fennel is marathon (μάραθον) or marathos (μάραθος), and the place of the famous battle of Marathon literally means a plain with fennel. The word is first attested in Mycenaean Linear B form as ma-ra-tu-wo. In Hesiod's Theogony, Prometheus steals the ember of fire from Mount Olympus in a hollow fennel stalk.

As Old English finule, fennel is one of the nine plants invoked in the pagan Anglo-Saxon Nine Herbs Charm, recorded in the 10th century.

In the 15th century, Portuguese settlers on Madeira noticed the abundance of wild fennel and used the Portuguese word funcho (fennel) and the suffix -al to form the name of a new town, Funchal.

Henry Wadsworth Longfellow's 1842 poem "The Goblet of Life" repeatedly refers to the plant and mentions its purported ability to strengthen eyesight:

Above the lower plants, it towers,
The Fennel with its yellow flowers;
And in an earlier age than ours
Was gifted with the wondrous powers
Lost vision to restore.
