= Sugar candy =

Candy primarily composed of sugar

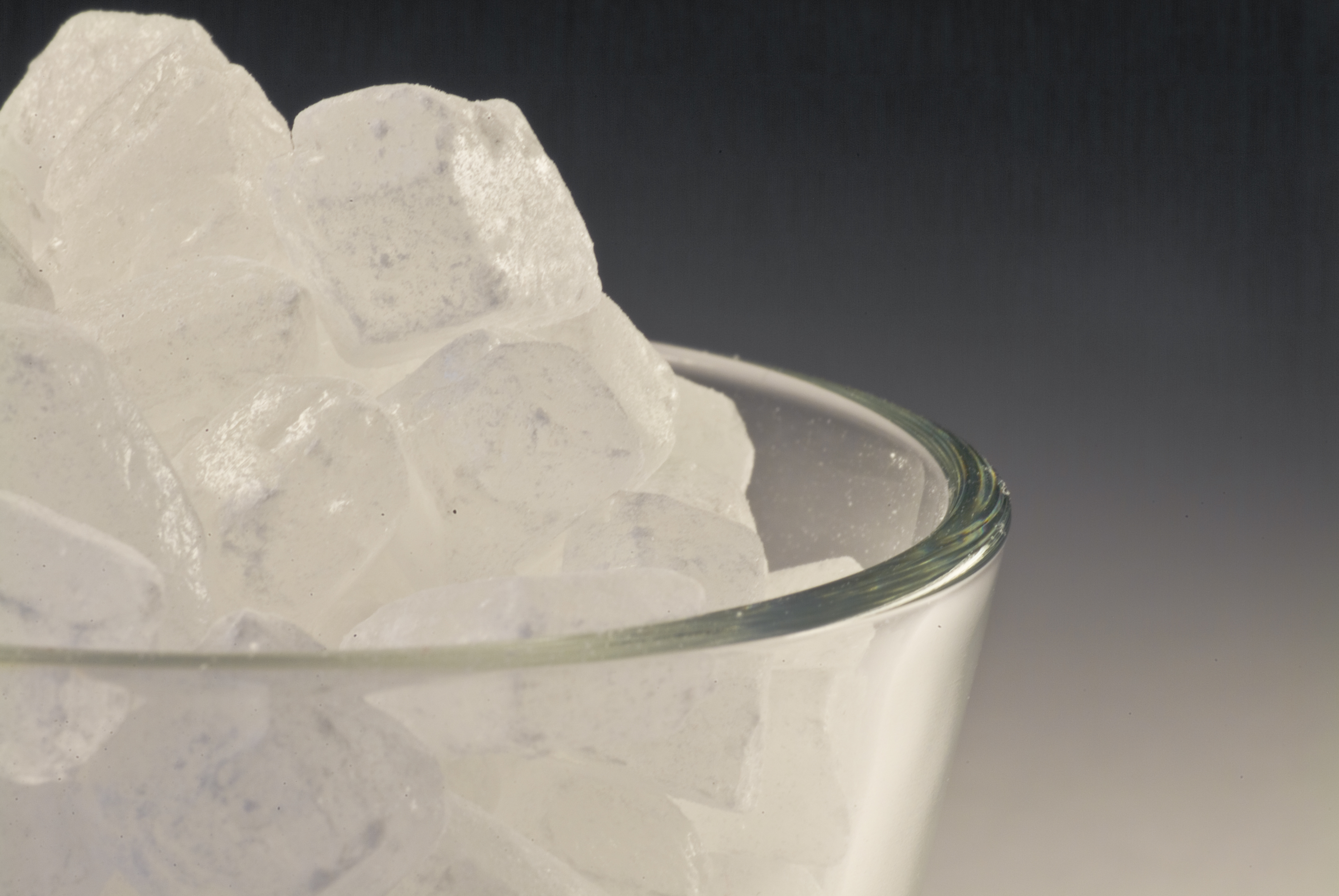
Sugar candy – large crystals of sugar produced from concentrated solutions, often called rock candy in America

Sugar candy (American English) or sweets (British English) is any candy whose primary ingredient is sugar. The main types of sugar candies are hard candies, fondants, caramels, jellies, and nougats. In British English, the name candy or sugar-candy is used only for hard candies that are nearly solid sugar.

Sugar candy is a sub-type of candy, which includes sugar candies as well as chocolates, chewing gum and other sweet foods. Candy, in turn, is a sub-type of confectionery, which also includes sweet pastries and sometimes ice cream.

== History ==
The oldest sugar candies are presumed to have been made where the sugar cane plant was domesticated. Sugar cane probably originated in Papua New Guinea, and from there was taken to Southeast Asia and other Pacific Islands, and ultimately to India and China. From India, sugar spread to the Arab states and eventually to Europe.

== Traditional uses ==
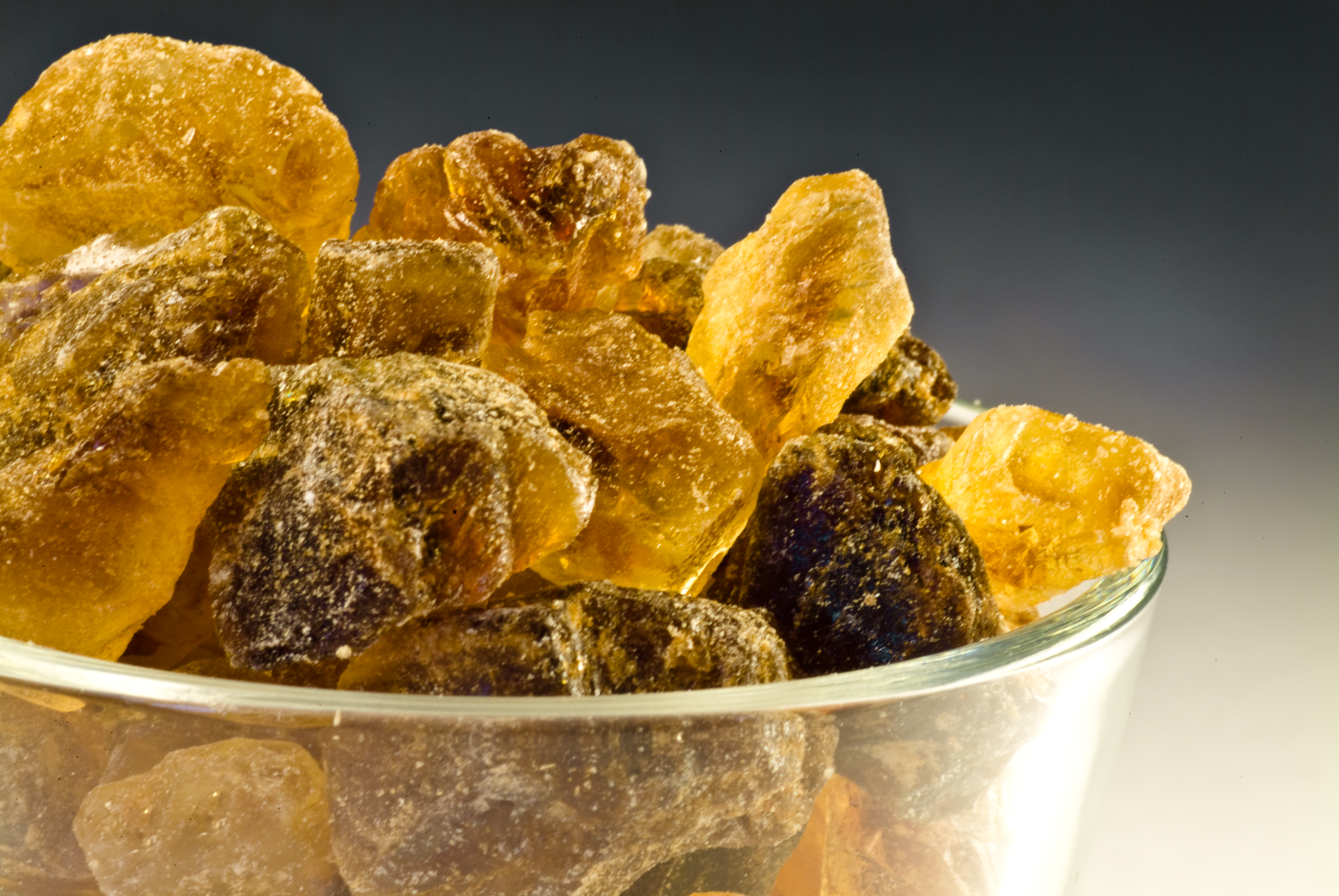
Brown sugar candy resulting from caramelisation

Sugar candy is often used to sweeten tea. Northern Germany, specifically East Frisia, has an established tea culture, where a large crystal of sugar candy (Kandiszucker or in the regional dialect Kluntje) is placed at the bottom of the cup and the hot tea added, which cracks and dissolves the crystal. Similarly in Iran, tea is consumed with sugar candy (called nabat) placed either in the tea or in the mouth. In China, sugar candy is used to sweeten Chrysanthemum tea as well as Cantonese dessert soups and the liquor baijiu.

Sugar candy is a common ingredient in Chinese cooking, and many households have sugar candy available to marinate meats and add to stir fry. Sugar candy is also regarded as having medicinal properties and is used to prepare food such as yao shan. It is a common ingredient in Tamil cuisine, particularly in the Sri Lankan city of Jaffna.

== Classification ==
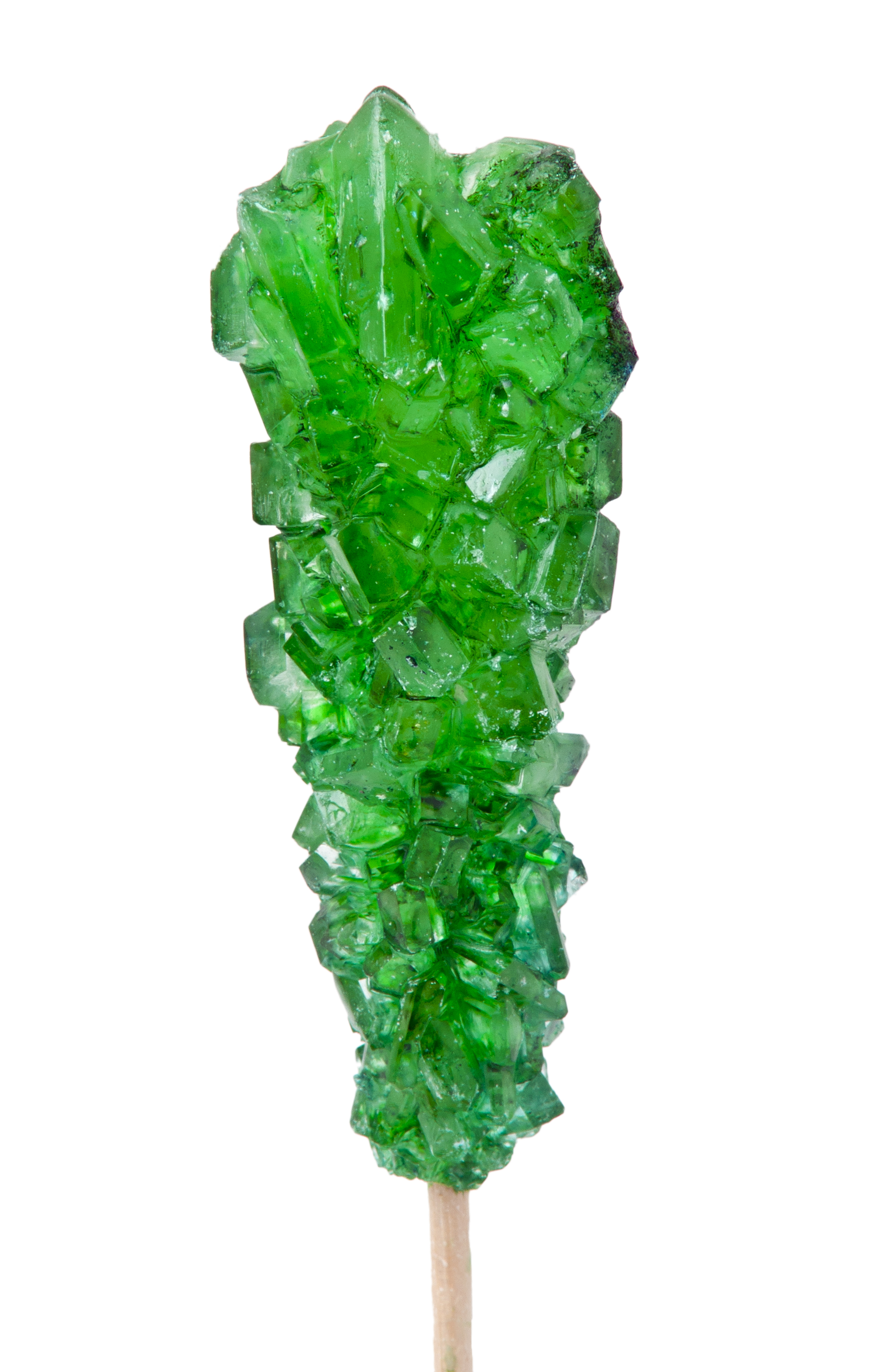
In candy classification, rock-hard sugar candies that look similar to real crystals actually have an amorphous crystal structure, not a crystalline one.

Chemically, sugar candies are broadly divided into two groups: crystalline candies and amorphous candies. Crystalline candies are not as hard as crystals of the mineral variety, but derive their name and their texture from their microscopically organized sugar structure, formed through a process of crystallization, which makes them easy to bite or cut into. Fudge, creams, and fondant are examples of crystalline candies. Amorphous candies have a disorganized crystalline structure. They usually have higher sugar concentrations, and the texture may be chewy, hard, or brittle. Hard candies, such as lollipops, caramels, nut brittles and toffees are all examples of amorphous sugar candies, even though some of them are as hard as rocks and resemble crystals in their overall appearance.

Crystalline sugar candies are chemically described as having two phases, because the tiny, solid sugar crystals are suspended in a thick liquid solution. These are also called grained candies, because they can have a grainy texture. Amorphous sugar candies have only one phase, which is either solid or liquid, and do not have a grainy texture, so they may be called ungrained.

Commercially, sugar candies are often divided into three groups, according to the amount of sugar they contain:

- 100% sugar (or nearly so), such as hard candies or creams
- 95% sugar or more, with up to 5% other ingredients, such as marshmallows or nougats, and
- 75 to 95% sugar, with 5 to 25% other ingredients, such as fudge or caramels.

Each of these three groups contains both crystalline (grained) and amorphous (ungrained) sugar candies.

== Types ==
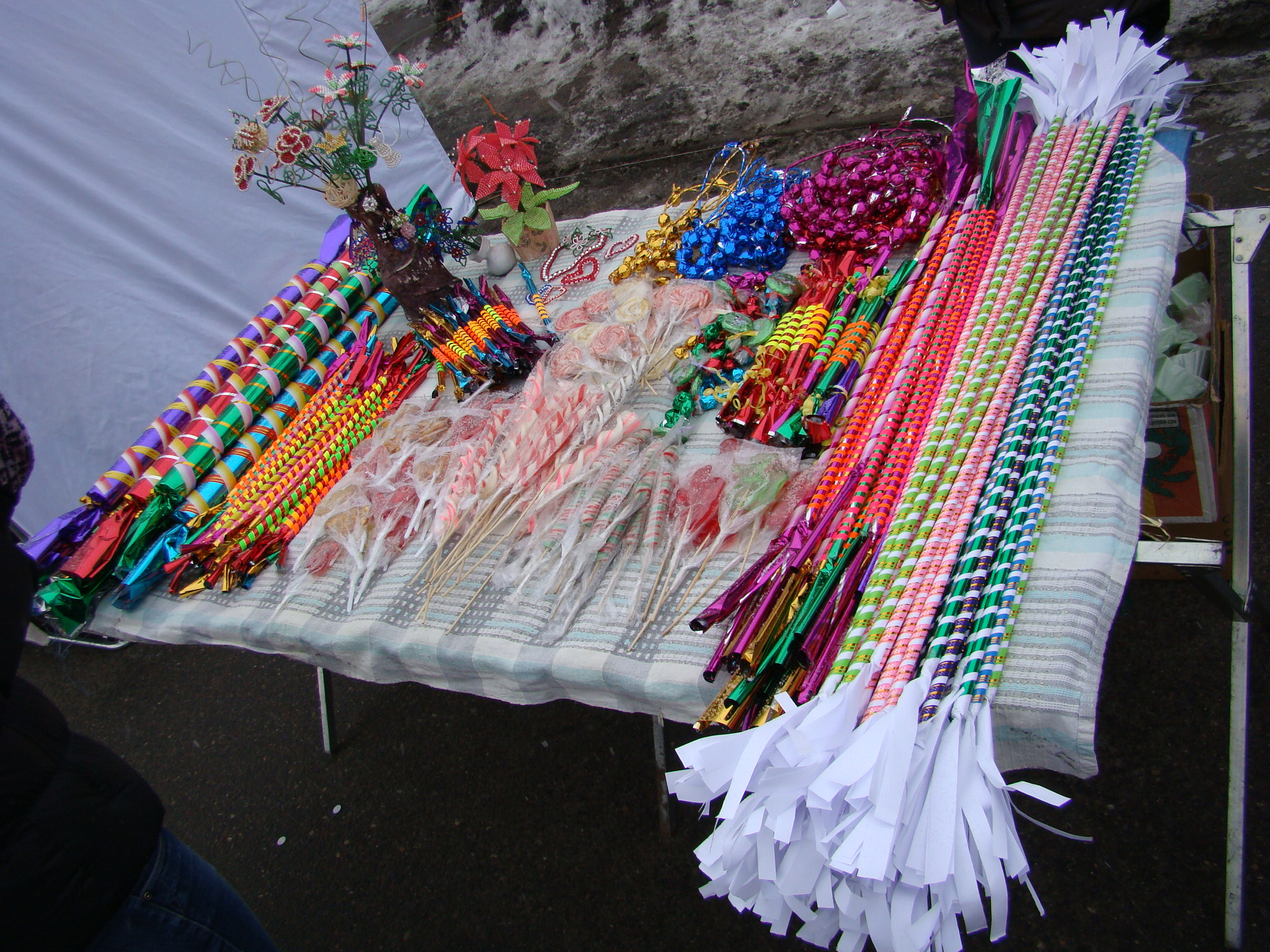
Colorfully wrapped hard candy is a traditional treat for children sold in Kaziuko mugė, Lithuania

Hard candies and pulled candies
Hard candies (also called boiled sweets) are single-phase, amorphous sugar candies that are commonly made from a combination of sucrose and glucose syrups. They are typically about 98% or more solid sugar. They have a glassy, translucent appearance. Pulled candy, like rock or Brach's starlight mints, is a hard candy that has been pulled or stretched to incorporate air. This process makes the candy opaque, as the air bubbles that are incorporated lead to more light being reflected back.
Fondants
Fondant candy is a partly crystallized, two-phased candy. It is about 88% sugar by weight, usually with much more sucrose than glucose. In making fondant, a stiff sugar paste is cooked to a high temperature, then carefully cooled in order to let the sugar soften and mechanically beaten to produce the desired texture.
Caramels and toffees

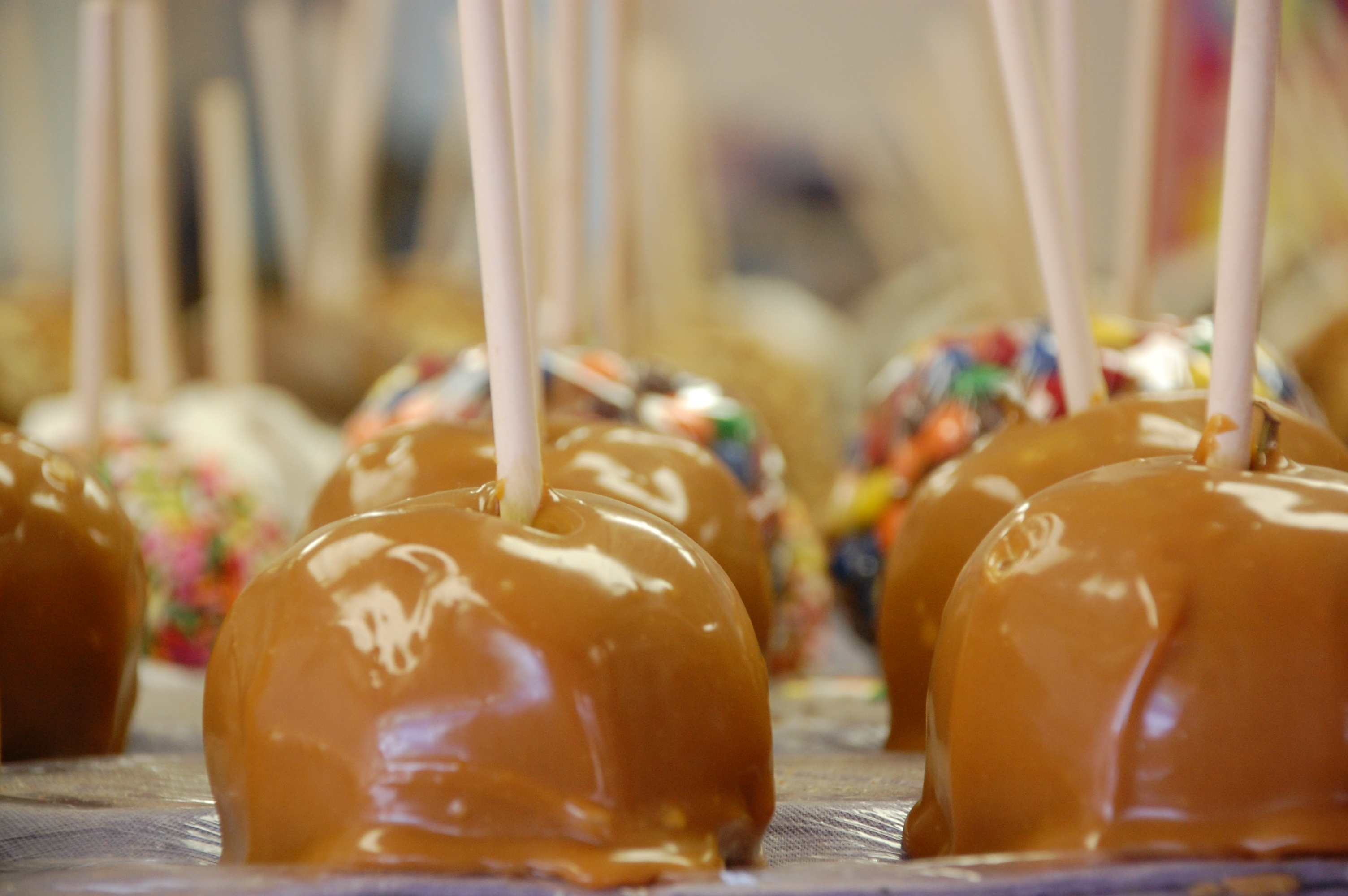
Caramel is also used as an ingredient in other confections, such as a coating for caramel apples.

Caramels contain milk and are cooked to a lower temperature than most sugar candies; toffees are similar, but use less milk and are cooked hotter. In both cases, the milk protein causes these emulsified sugar candies to hold their shapes and prevents the sugars from crystallizing. Their brown colour is due to a Maillard reaction between the milk protein and the sugars.
Fudges

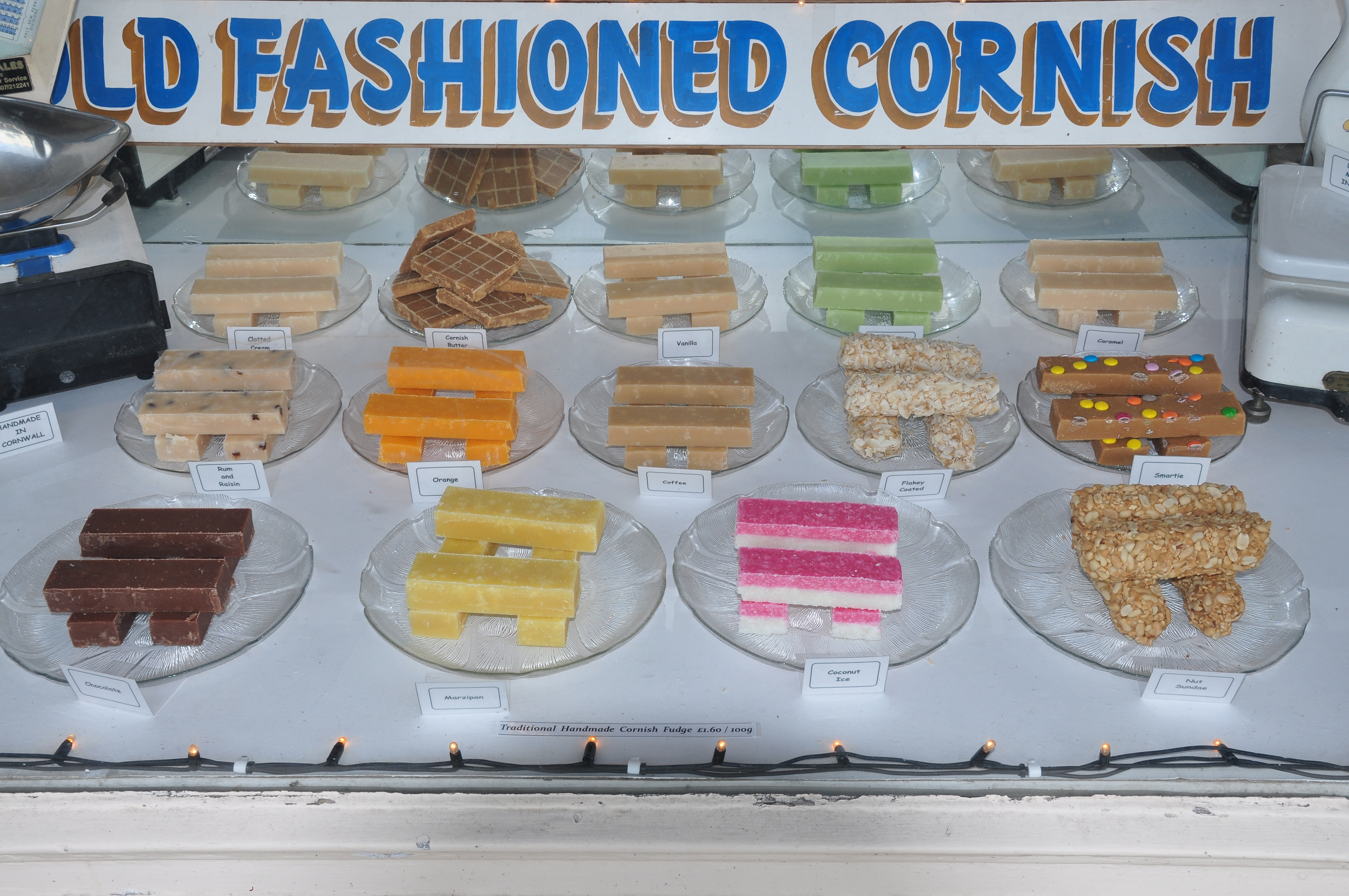
Fudge is defined by its texture, and many kinds do not contain any chocolate.

Fudges, which are made in a wide variety of flavours, are essentially two-phased, crystallized caramels, with a short texture (easily broken). Sugar crystals are formed either due to agitation or the addition of crystal seeds in the form of powdered sugar or crushed fondant candy. The texture depends on the number and size of sugar crystals, the fat content, and the dispersion of milk solids.
Nougats and marshmallows
Nougats and marshmallows are confectionery foams, full of air. In the final product, there is often as much air, or even more, than sugar; for marshmallows, a ratio of 5 parts air to two parts syrup by volume is typical. Chemically, they may be single-phase or two-phased. Marshmallows are stabilized by a colloid like gelatin. Compared to nougats, marshmallows have higher moisture content, are softer and more rubbery, and dry out more easily.
Jellies and gums
Jellies and gums are thick, liquid sugar candies. Gums, such as wine gums, are drier than jellies. They are made from sugar syrup plus a gelling agent. They are cooked to the lowest temperature of all sugar candies and consequently have the highest water content of sugar candies, about 20 to 25% water. Their stiffness depends on the type and amount of gelling agent, the final concentration, the pH of the product, and other factors. The most popular forms of gelling agent are gelatin, agar-agar, starch (more typical of American jelly candies), and pectin (more typical of European candies). These produce different effects. For example, starch produces cloudy jellies, while high-methoxyl pectin produces clear ones. Agar-based jellies are harder to dissolve, and gelatin-based jellies have a more rubbery texture.
Nut pastes
The most common nut paste candy is marzipan, which is an almond nut paste. Nut pastes are made by mixing crushed nuts with a sugar syrup.
Panned candies

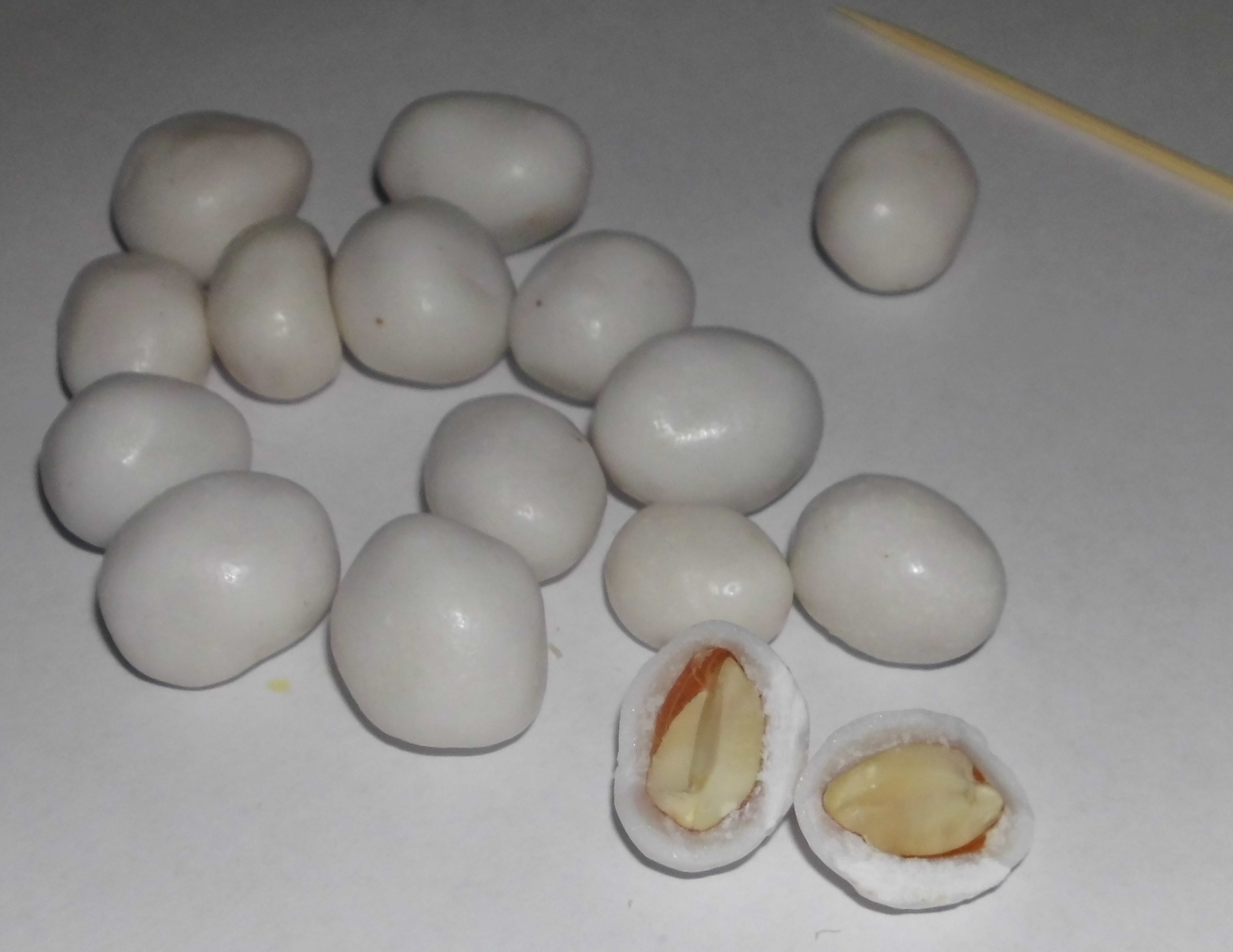
Candy-coated peanuts are called dragees.

Panned candy is a category of sugar candy that includes dragées and comfits. These sugar candies are formed by coating nuts, preserved fruits, or other sugar candies with either sugar or chocolate in a revolving pan.
Pralines, truffles, and noisettes
There is significant variation among pralines, truffles, and noisettes. In general, they involve roasting nuts in a high-temperature sugar syrup, and then grinding the cooled result into a paste.
Lozenge pastes and cream pastes

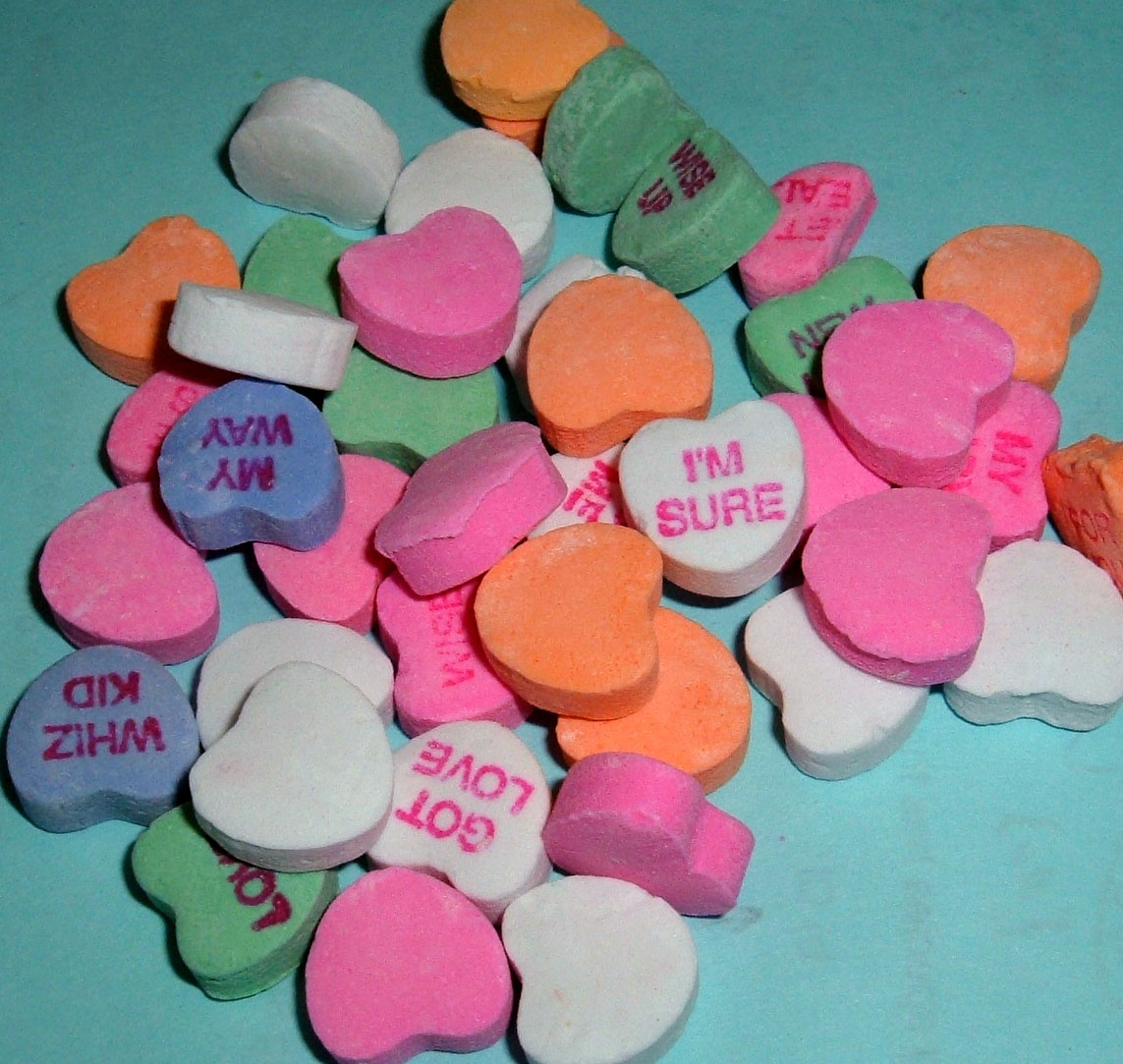
Conversation hearts are a non-medicinal lozenge paste candy.

Lozenge paste is a candy made by combining fine sugar with a natural gum like gum arabic. The paste is stamped, cut, and dried until almost no water content remains. Conversation hearts are an example of lozenge paste candies that have been manufactured for over a century. A cream paste may include gelatin and is not dried as completely.
Licorice
Licorice is a candy flavored by liquorice plants. It is usually a stiff, gelatinous paste.

=== Medicinal uses ===
Historically, candy was used not only as food but also as pharmaceutical preparations, to disguise the unpleasant taste of the drug ingredients. Cough drops and some other drugs show this heritage in the form of sugar tablets containing drugs, active drug ingredients being added to hard candies, and panned sugar coatings surrounding unpalatable pills.

During the Middle Ages, Thomas Aquinas authorized the consumption of sugar candy during the fasting period of Lent, because "sugared spices" (such as comfits) were, in his opinion, digestive aids on par with medicine rather than food.

=== Storage and shelf life ===
Shelf life is largely determined by the amount of water present in the candy and the storage conditions. High-sugar candies, such as hard candies, can have a shelf life of many years if kept covered in a dry environment. Spoilage for low-moisture candies tends to involve a loss of shape, color, texture and flavor, rather than the growth of dangerous microbes. Impermeable packaging can reduce spoilage due to storage conditions.

Candies spoil more quickly if they have different amounts of water in different parts of the candy (for example, a candy that combines marshmallow and nougat), or if they are stored in high-moisture environments. This process is due to the effects of water activity, which results in the transfer of unwanted water from a high-moisture environment into a low-moisture candy, rendering it rubbery, or the loss of desirable water from a high-moisture candy into a dry environment, rendering the candy dry and brittle.

Another factor, affecting only non-crystalline amorphous sugar candies, is the glass transition process. This can cause amorphous candies to lose their intended texture.

== Art and literature ==
In George Orwell's satirical book Animal Farm which equates the Soviet Union with an animal farm ruthlessly dominated by a ruling class of pigs, a raven called Moses regales Animal Farm's denizens with tales of a wondrous place beyond the clouds called "Sugarcandy Mountain, that happy country where we poor animals shall rest forever from our labours!" Orwell portrays established religion as "the black raven of priestcraft—promising pie in the sky when you die, and faithfully serving whoever happens to be in power." The pigs bring the exiled raven back (Ch. IX), as Stalin brought back the Russian Orthodox Church.

== See also ==
- Candi sugar – a form of sugar used in beer brewing
- Peen tong – a Chinese brown sugar and candy
