= Mukhwas =

South Asian after-meal breath freshener

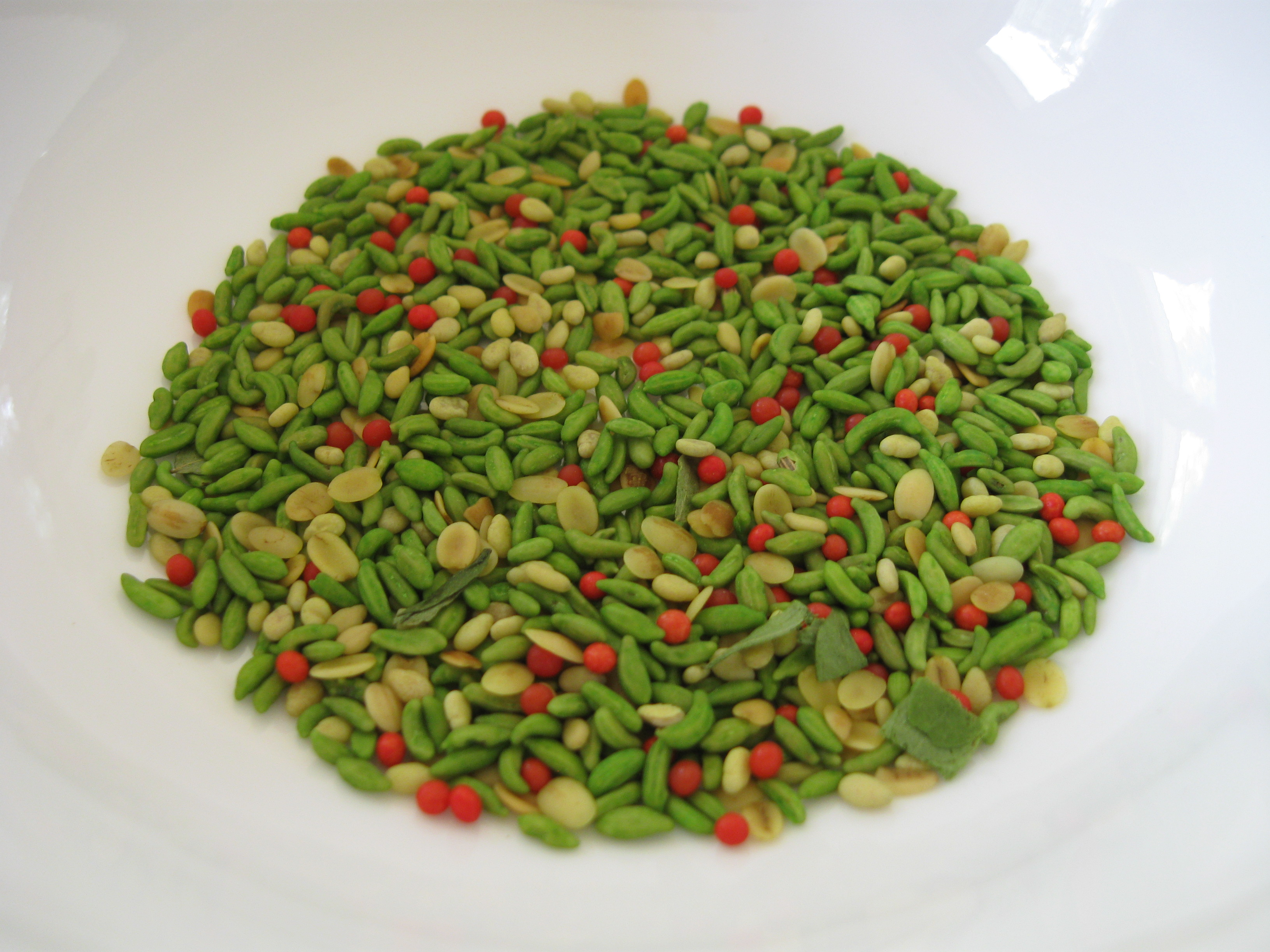
- Green mukhwas, mainly fennel seed
- Place of origin: India and other South Asian countries
- Main ingredients: seeds and nuts, essential oils (peppermint)

Mukhwas is a colourful South Asian after-meal snack used as a breath freshener. As per Agamas, mukhwas forms one of the components of sixteen upcharas (offerings) to a deity in a Puja, the Hindu mode of worship or prayer. It consists of various seeds and nuts, often fennel, anise, coconut, coriander, and sesame. They can be savory or sweet in flavor and are often aromatic due to the addition of various essential oils, including peppermint. Mukhwas are often coated in sugar and brightly colored.

== History and etymology ==
The word "mukhwas" is an amalgamation of the Sanskrit words mukha (mouth) and vāsa (to stay/to keep). Mukhwas forms an essential part of the Hindu tradition of Shodash Shringar (sixteen embellishments, as mentioned by the Hindu poet Keshavdas. Ancient Sanskrit literature and Medieval Hindu literature in Hindi, Rajasthani, and Gujarati contain references to mukhwas.

== See also ==
- Muisjes
