= Breakfast =

Meal eaten in the morning

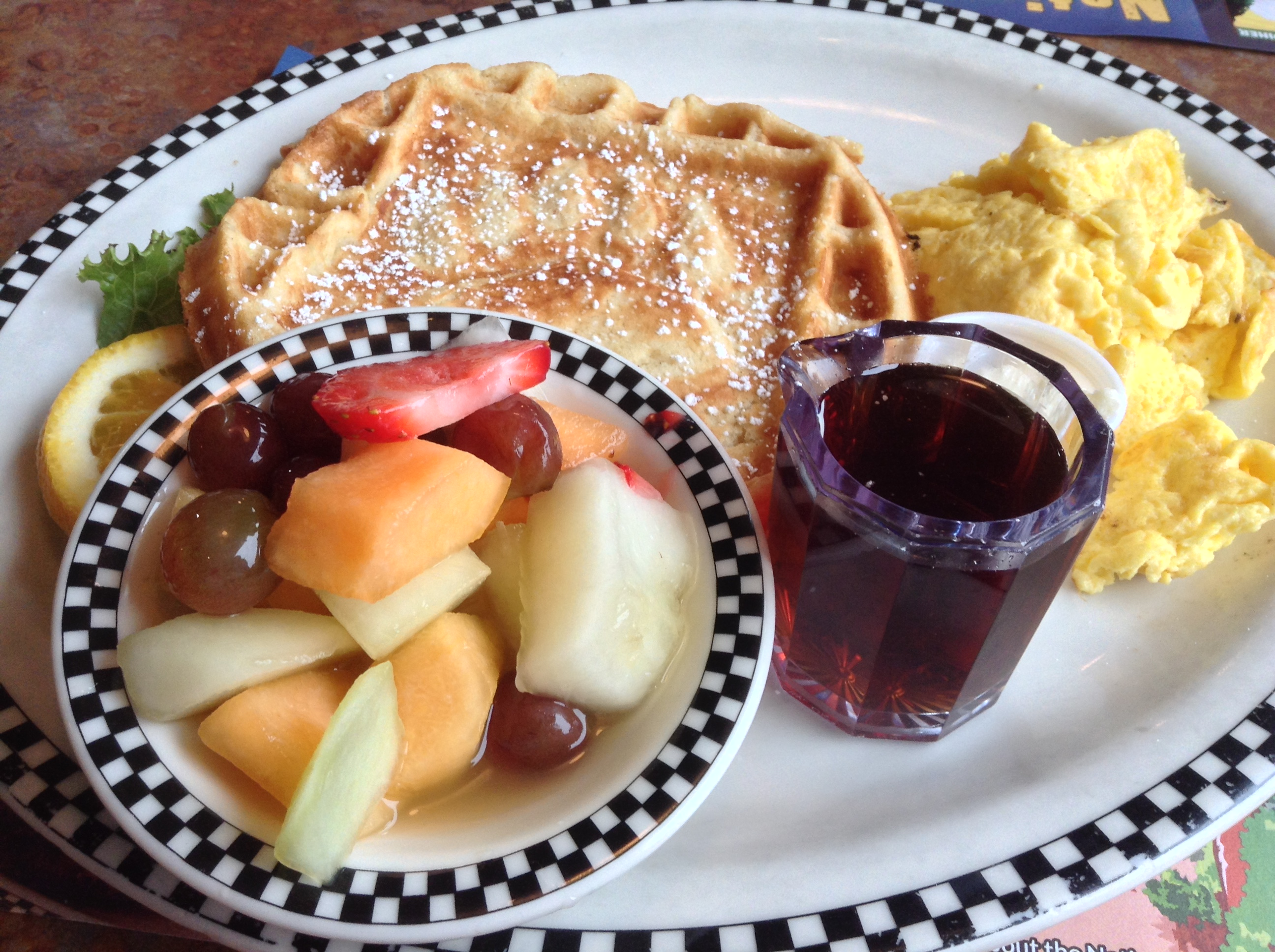
A typical American breakfast, composed of a waffle, fruits, juice and scrambled eggs

Breakfast is the first meal of the day, usually eaten in the morning. The word in English refers to breaking the fasting period of the previous night. Various "typical" or "traditional" breakfast menus exist, with food choices varying by regions and traditions worldwide.

== History ==
In Old English, a regular morning meal was called morgenmete, and the word dinner, which originated from Gallo-Romance desjunare ("to break one's fast"), referred to a meal after fasting. Around the mid-13th century, that meaning of dinner faded away, and around the 15th century "breakfast" came into use in written English to describe a morning meal.

=== Ancient breakfast ===
==== Ancient Egypt ====
In Ancient Egypt, peasants ate a daily meal, most likely in the morning, consisting of soup, beer, bread, and onions before they left for work in the fields or work commanded by the pharaohs.

The traditional breakfast believed to have been cooked in ancient Egypt was fūl (made from fava beans, possibly the ancestor of today's ful medames), baladi bread, made from emmer wheat, and falafel, and a mixture of fava beans with onions, garlic, parsley and coriander.

==== Ancient Greece ====
In Greek literature, there are numerous mentions of ariston, a meal taken not long after sunrise. The Iliad notes this meal with regard to a labor-weary woodsman eager for a light repast to start his day, preparing it even as he is aching with exhaustion. The opening prose of the 16th book of the Odyssey mentions breakfast as the meal being prepared in the morning before attending to one's chores. Eventually ariston was moved to around noon, and a new morning meal was introduced.

In the post-Homeric classical period of Greece, a meal called akratisma was typically consumed immediately after rising in the morning. Akratisma (ἀκρατισμός, akratismos) consisted of barley bread dipped in wine (ἄκρατος, akratos), sometimes complemented by figs or olives. They also made pancakes called tēganitēs (τηγανίτης), tagēnitēs (ταγηνίτης), or tagēnias (ταγηνίας), all words deriving from tagēnon (τάγηνον), meaning "frying pan". The earliest attested references on tagēnias are in the works of the 5th century BC poets Cratinus and Magnes. Another kind of pancake was staititēs (σταιτίτης), from staitinos (σταίτινος), "of flour or dough of spelt", derived itself from stais (σταῖς), "flour of spelt". Athenaeus in his Deipnosophistae mentions staititas topped with honey, sesame and cheese.

==== Ancient Rome ====
Romans called breakfast ientaculum. It was usually composed of everyday staples like bread, cheese, olives, salad, nuts, raisins, and cold meat left over from the night before. They also drank wine-based drinks such as mulsum, a mixture of wine, honey, and aromatic spices. 1st century Latin poet Martial said that ientaculum was eaten at 3:00 or 4:00 in the morning, while 16th century scholar Claudius Saumaise wrote that it was typically eaten at 9:00 or 10:00 a.m. It seems unlikely that any fixed time was truly assigned for this meal.

Roman soldiers woke up to a breakfast of pulmentus, porridge similar to the Italian polenta, made from roasted spelt wheat or barley that was then pounded and cooked in a cauldron of water.

=== Middle Ages (500–1500) ===
==== Europe ====
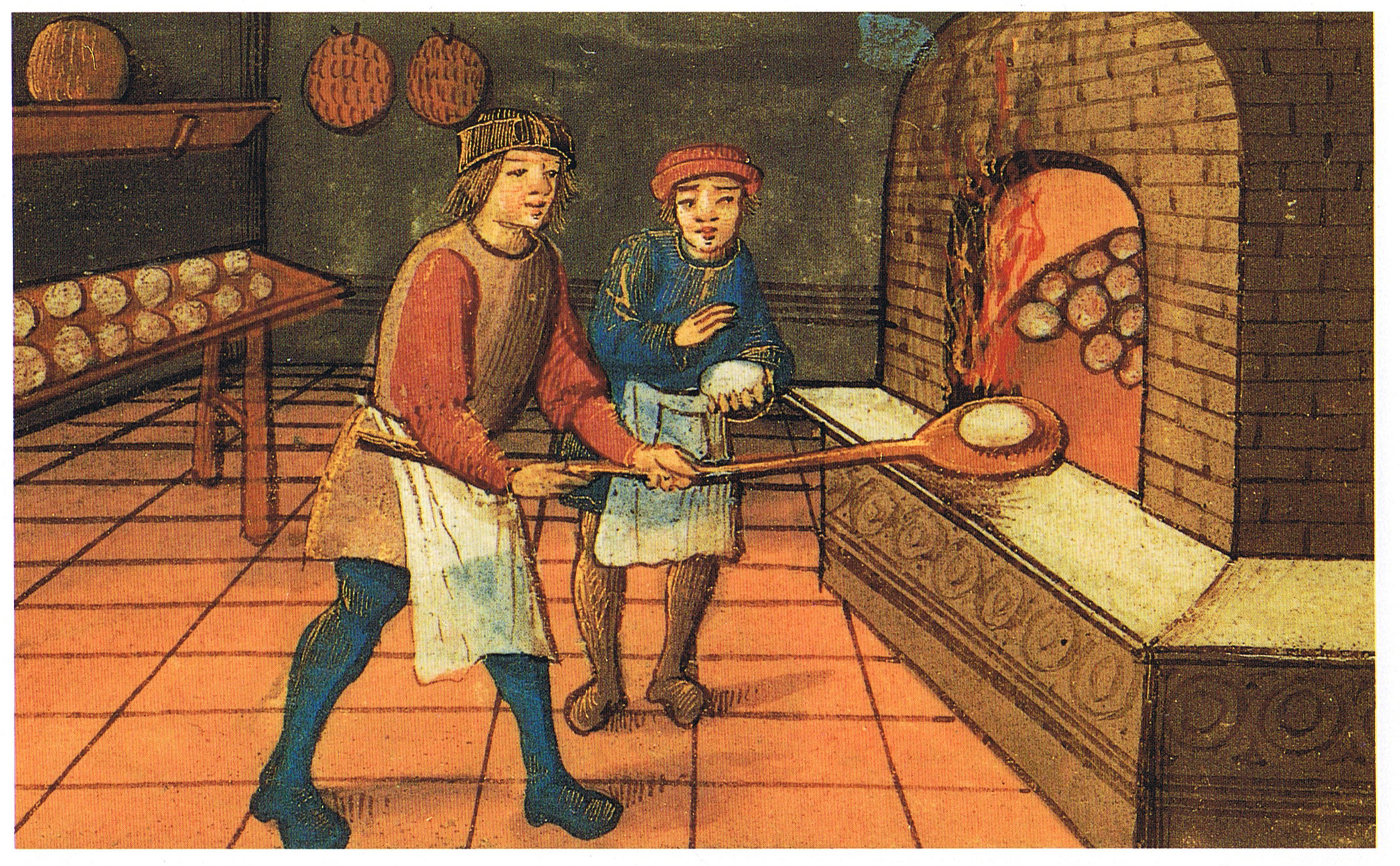
A medieval baker with his apprentice. As seen in the illustration, round loaves were among the most common.

In the European Middle Ages, breakfast was commonly eaten by working people, as well as children, the elderly, the sick, while the upper classes didn't speak of or partake in eating in the morning. Eating breakfast meant that one was poor, was a low-status farmer or laborer who truly needed the energy to sustain his morning's labor, or was too weak to make it to the large, midday dinner. Monarchs and their entourages would spend a lot of time around a table for meals. Only two formal meals were eaten per day—one at mid-day and one in the evening. The exact times varied by period and region, but this two-meal system remained consistent throughout the Middle Ages.

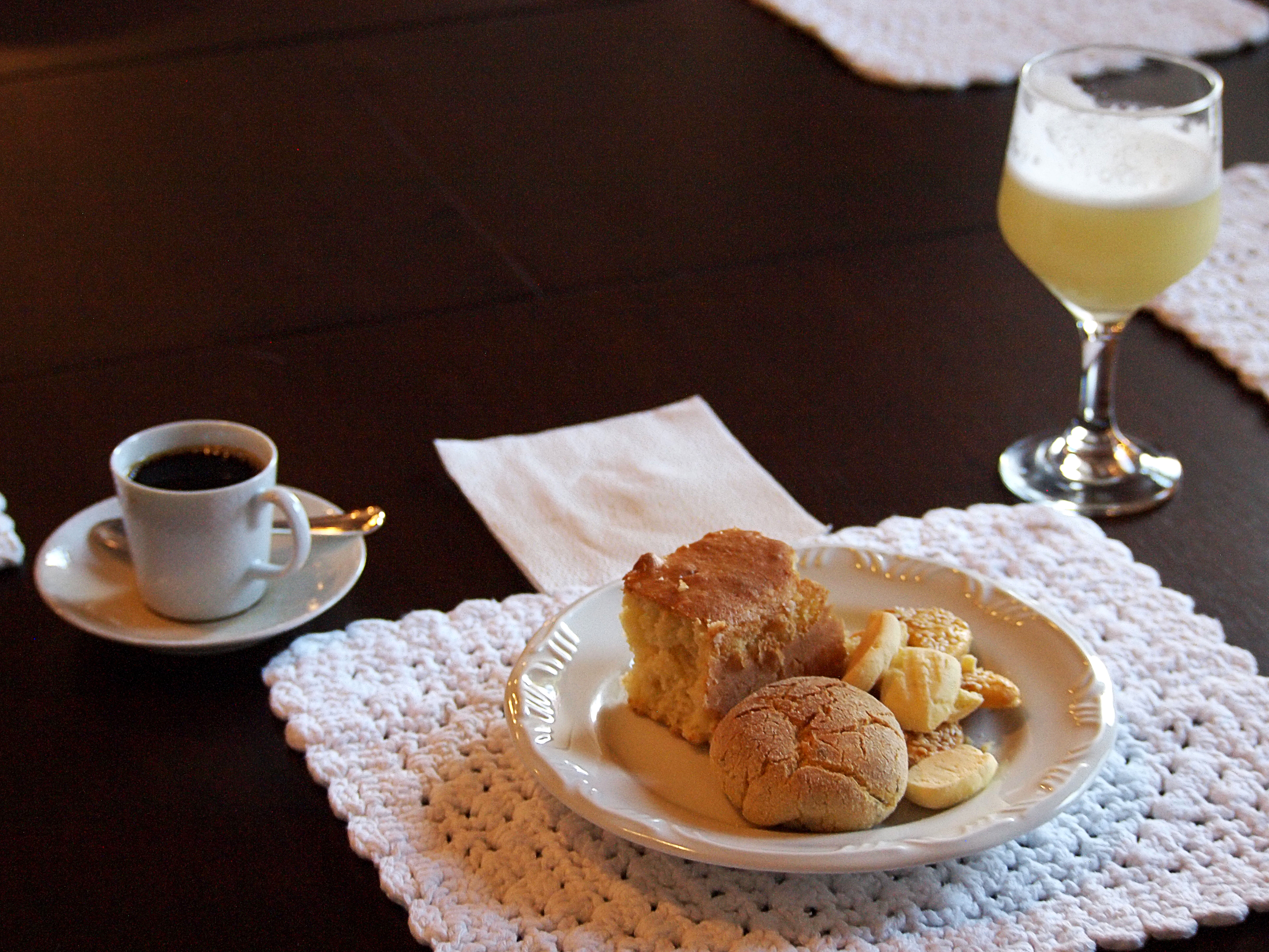
Breakfast in Brazil

In the 13th century, breakfast when eaten sometimes consisted of a piece of rye bread and a bit of cheese. Morning meals would not include any meat, and would likely include 0.4 imperial gallons (1.8 L) of low alcohol-content beers. Uncertain quantities of bread and ale could have been consumed in between meals.

By the 15th century, breakfast in western Europe often included meat. By this time, noble men were seen to indulge in breakfast, making it more of a common practice, and by the early 16th century, recorded expenses for breakfast became customary. Breakfast in eastern Europe remained mostly the same as the modern day: a "continental breakfast". The 16th century introduction of caffeinated beverages into the European diet was also an addition to breakfast; it was believed that coffee and tea aid the body in "evacuation of superfluities".

=== Modern breakfast (1500–present) ===
==== Africa ====
Traditionally, the various cuisines of Africa use a combination of locally available fruits, cereal grains and vegetables, as well as milk and meat products. In some parts of the continent, the traditional diet features milk, curd and whey products. A type of porridge is most commonly eaten. In the book The Bible cyclopædia (et al.) published in 1843, it was documented that during this time in the Arab world, Bedouins often utilized locusts mixed with butter for breakfast, spreading the mixture on unleavened bread.

===== Egypt =====
In the book The Bible cyclopædia (et al.) published in 1843, it was documented that Egyptians were early risers that sometimes had a first meal consisting of coffee along with the smoking of a pipe, and did not eat breakfast until noon. At this time, it was documented that Egyptian breakfast foods included bread, cheese, eggs, butter, curds, clotted cream and stewed beans. In addition, fava beans are an established national breakfast dish.

==== Asia ====
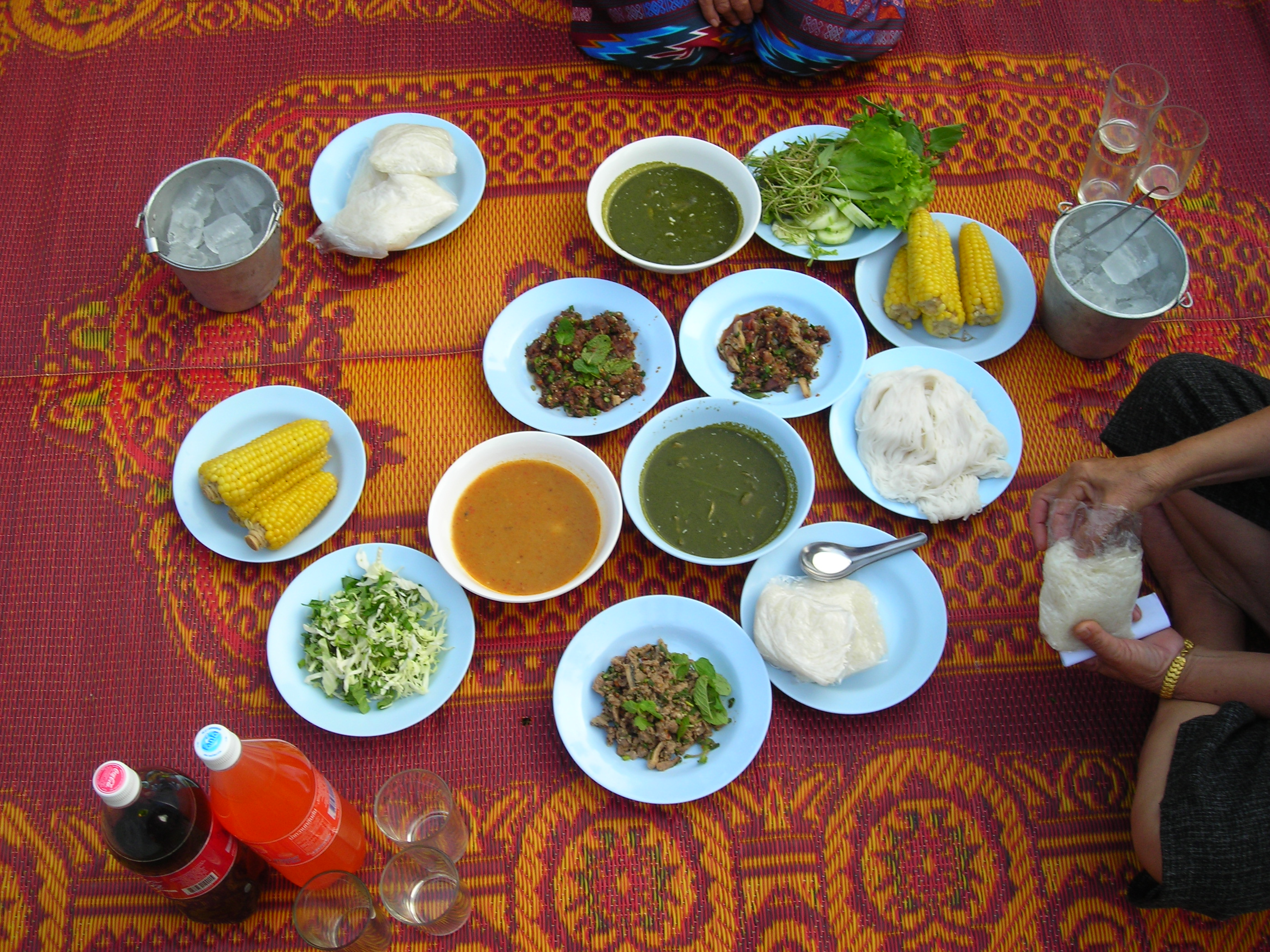
A family breakfast in the Isan region of Thailand

===== Middle East =====
In the Middle East region of Asia, Iftar refers to the evening meal when Muslims break their sawm (fast) during the Islamic month of Ramadan. Iftar is one of the religious observances of Ramadan, and is often done as a community, with people gathering to break their fast together. Iftar is done right after Maghrib (sunset) time. During the month of Ramadan, Muslims replace traditional breakfast with suhoor, an Islamic term referring to the meal consumed early in the morning by Muslims before sawm during daylight hours. The meal is eaten before fajr (dawn).

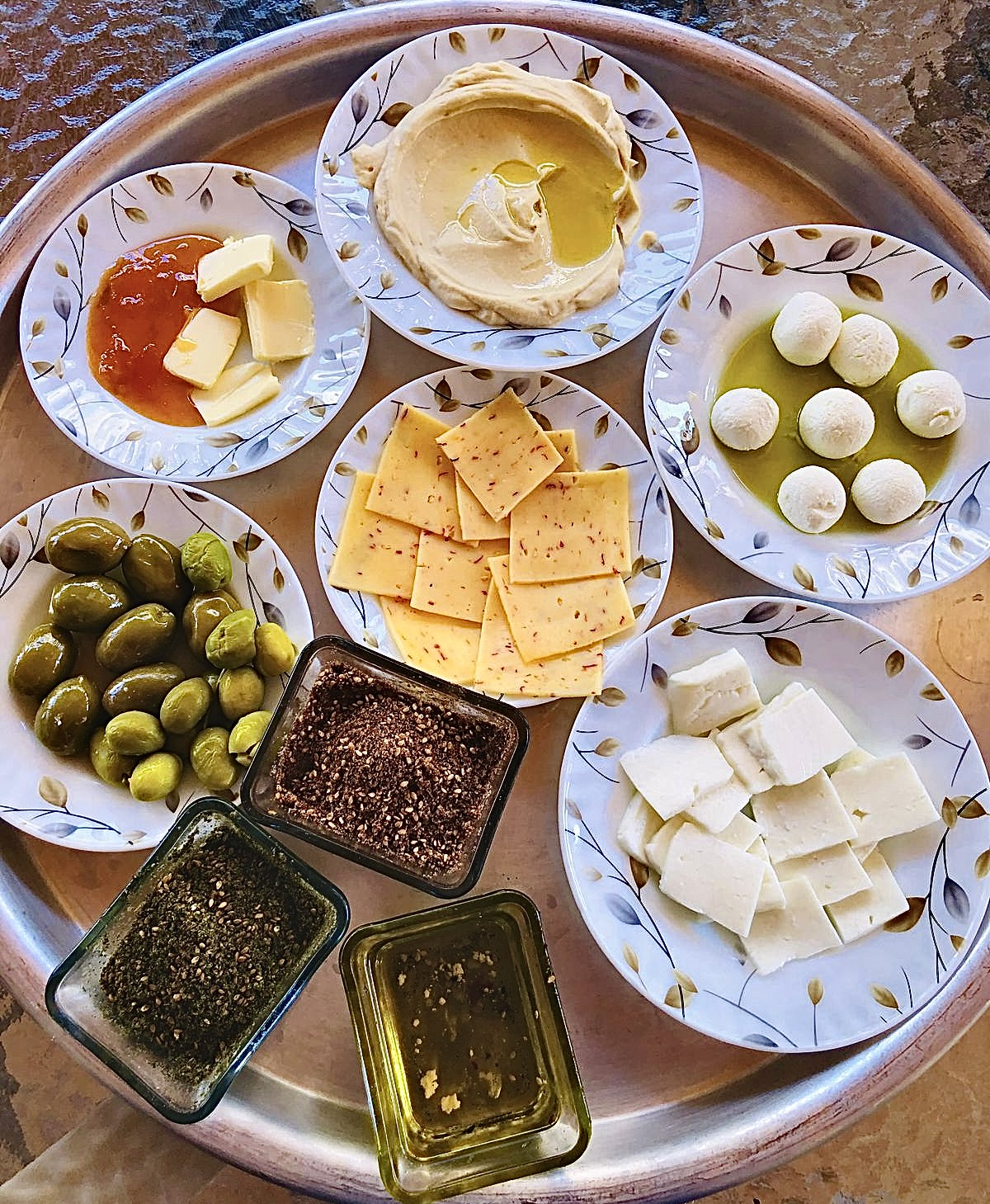
Traditional Levantine breakfast with a variety of local delights

===== Japan =====
In Japan, it is common to eat miso soup and rice porridge for breakfast.

===== Lebanon =====
In the book The Bible cyclopædia (et al.) it was documented that c. 1843, poor Lebanese people would consume raw leeks with bread for breakfast.

==== Europe ====
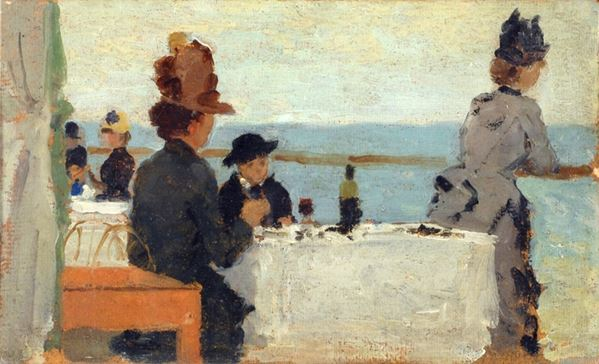
Breakfast with a view, by Vittorio Matteo Corcos

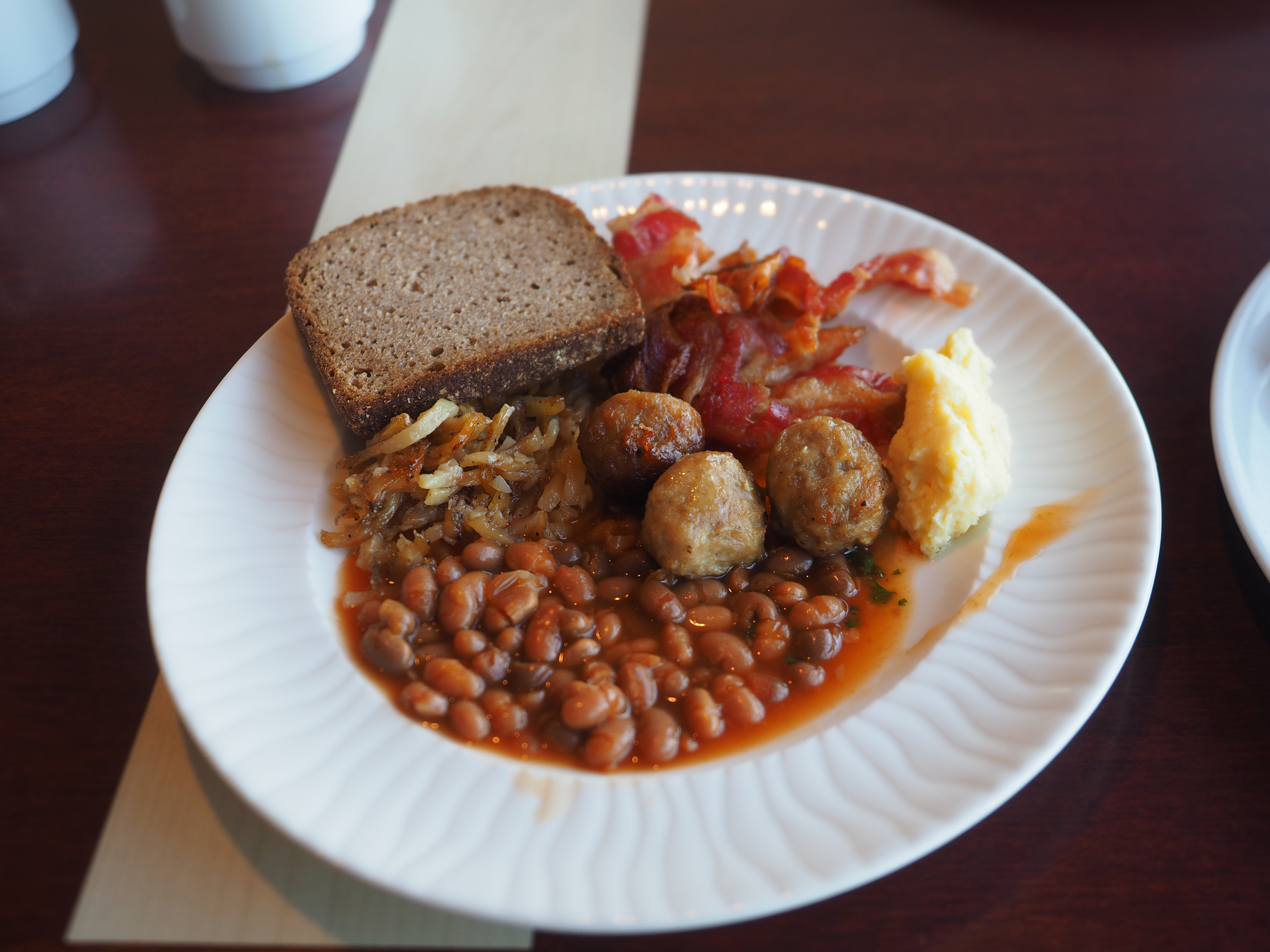
Buffet breakfast on the ship MS Gabriella

===== Austria =====
The croissant appears to have originated in Vienna, Austria, in 1683.

===== France =====
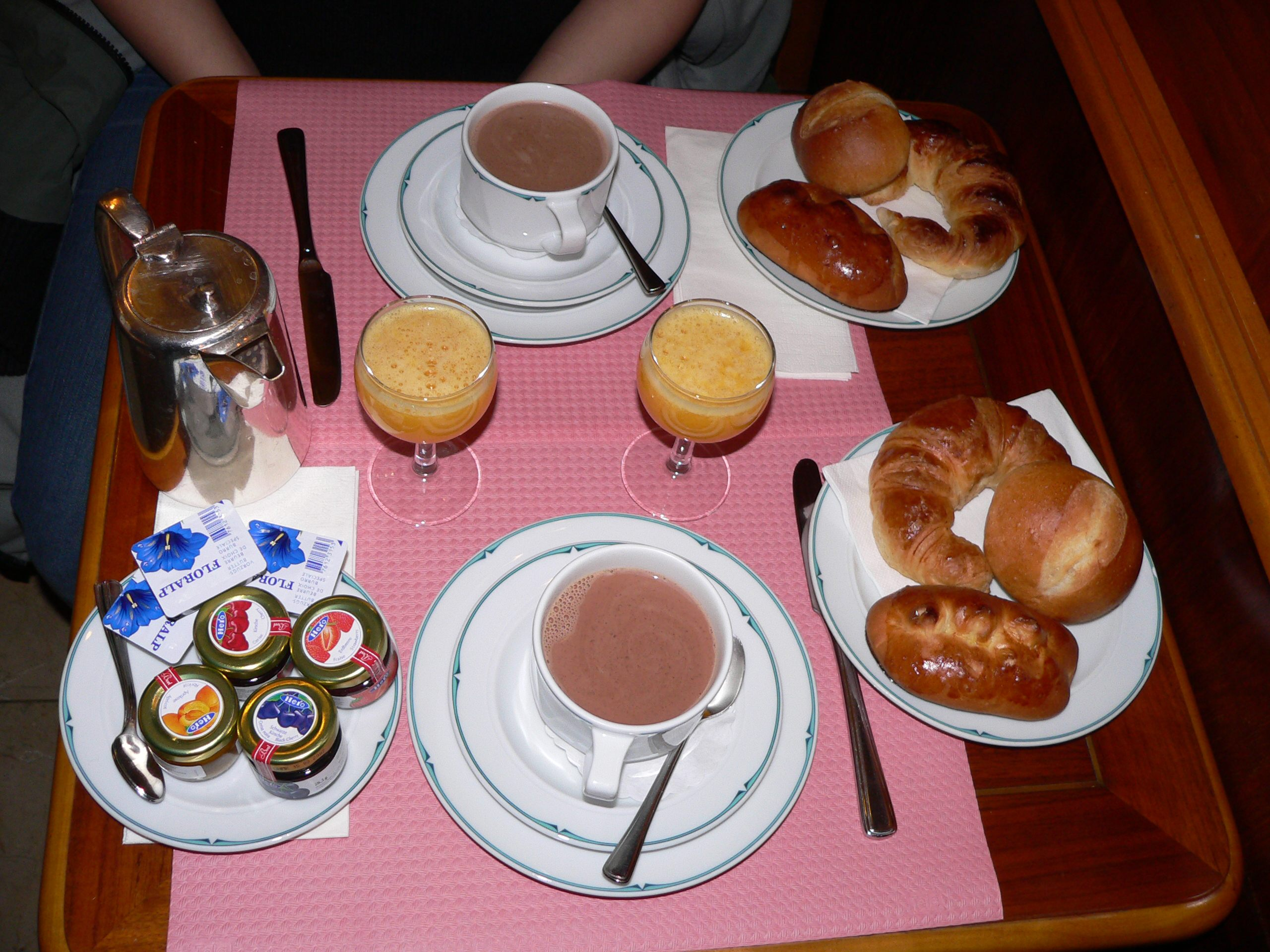
A continental breakfast

French breakfasts are often similar to the continental breakfast. French breakfast pastries include apple turnovers, brioche, croissant and pain au chocolat. Croissants have been described as becoming a standard fare in French breakfast cuisine by 1875.

===== Netherlands =====
Breakfast usually consists of bread with a wide variety of cold cuts, cheeses and sweet toppings; such as hagelslag, vlokken, muisjes, gestampte muisjes, chocolate spread, treacle (a thick, dark brown sugar syrup called stroop), apple butter and peanut butter.

The word waffle derives from the Dutch word wafel, which itself derives from the Middle Dutch wafele, and is likely the origin of the food as it is known today.

===== United Kingdom =====
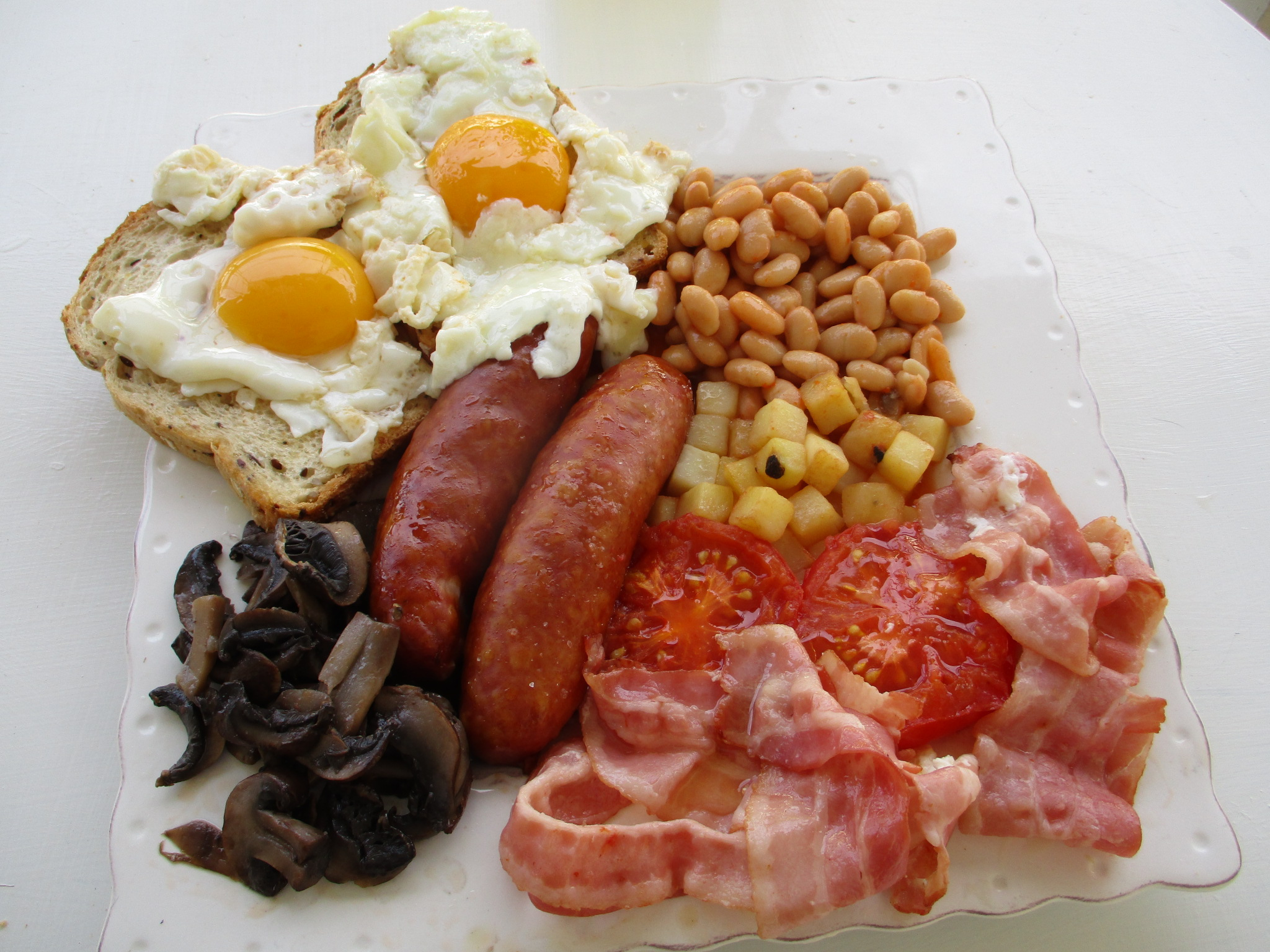
A full English breakfast with fried eggs on toast, sausage, bacon, mushrooms, baked beans, hash browns, and tomato

In the early 16th century, some physicians warned against eating breakfast, because they said it was not healthy to eat before a prior meal was digested. By the 1550s, however, there were multiple sources that claimed breakfast was an important meal. For example, in 1551, Thomas Wingfield stated that breakfast was essential. In 1589, Thomas Cogan stated that it was unhealthy to miss breakfast in the morning. He was one of the first to claim that it was healthy for those who were not young, ill or elders to eat breakfast.

The full breakfast is a staple of British cuisine, and typically consists of bacon, sausages and eggs, often served with a variety of side dishes and a beverage such as coffee or tea. Prior to 1600, breakfast in Great Britain typically included bread, cold meat or fish, and ale. Tea, chocolate and coffee were introduced to Great Britain in the mid-1600s, and in the 1700s coffee and chocolate were adopted as breakfast drinks by the fashionable. Tea eventually became more popular than chocolate as a breakfast drink.

==== North America ====
The first groups known to have produced maple syrup and maple sugar were indigenous peoples living in the northeastern part of North America. According to aboriginal oral traditions, as well as archaeological evidence, maple tree sap was being processed into syrup long before Europeans arrived in the region.

===== Canada =====
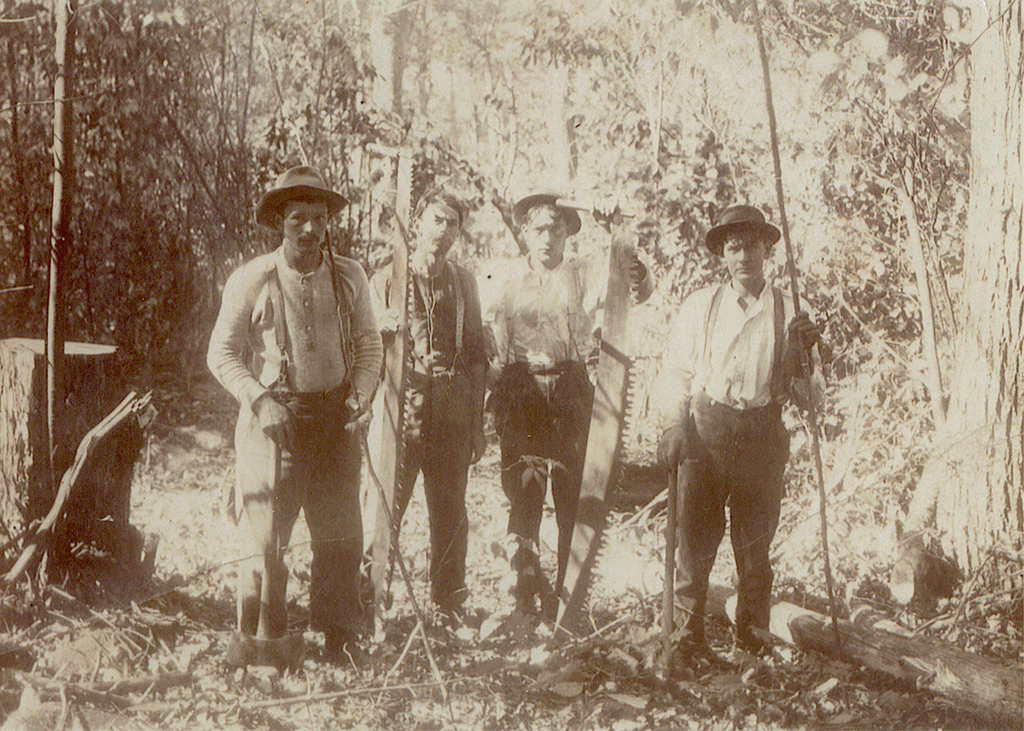
Lumberjacks

While it has been a source of controversy where the lumberjack breakfast came from, the most cited source is that the lumberjack breakfast was first served in a Vancouver hotel, in 1870. The breakfast consisted of eggs, assorted fried pork strips, and flapjacks. It is said by Anita Stewart that the tradition of hearty cooking developed because of men needing the energy for manual labor.

===== Mexico =====
A typical Aztec breakfast often included corn porridge with honey and chillies, or tortillas with beans and salsa.

Chilaquiles are a staple breakfast dish that dates back to the times of the Aztecs; they consist of tortilla chips (locally known as "totopos") slathered in salsa and usually come with a side of refried beans. Depending on the region or person, they may be eaten with fried or scrambled eggs, pulled chicken, sprinkled cheese, crema, diced onion, or chopped cilantro (coriander) leaves. Eggs are also a staple in Mexican breakfasts, scrambled and fried eggs are usually eaten with tortillas, salsa, and beans; local varieties include huevos rancheros and "huevos con tortilla", which are scrambled eggs fried alongside pieces of corn tortillas.

Breakfast cereals are also common in Mexico, mainly due to American influence. Health concerns have arisen regarding the nutritional quality of processed breakfast cereal; it is estimated that Mexican preschoolers consume 7% of their total energy intake from processed breakfast cereals and that 6% of Mexican children exclusively have ready-to-eat cereals with milk for breakfast.

===== United States =====
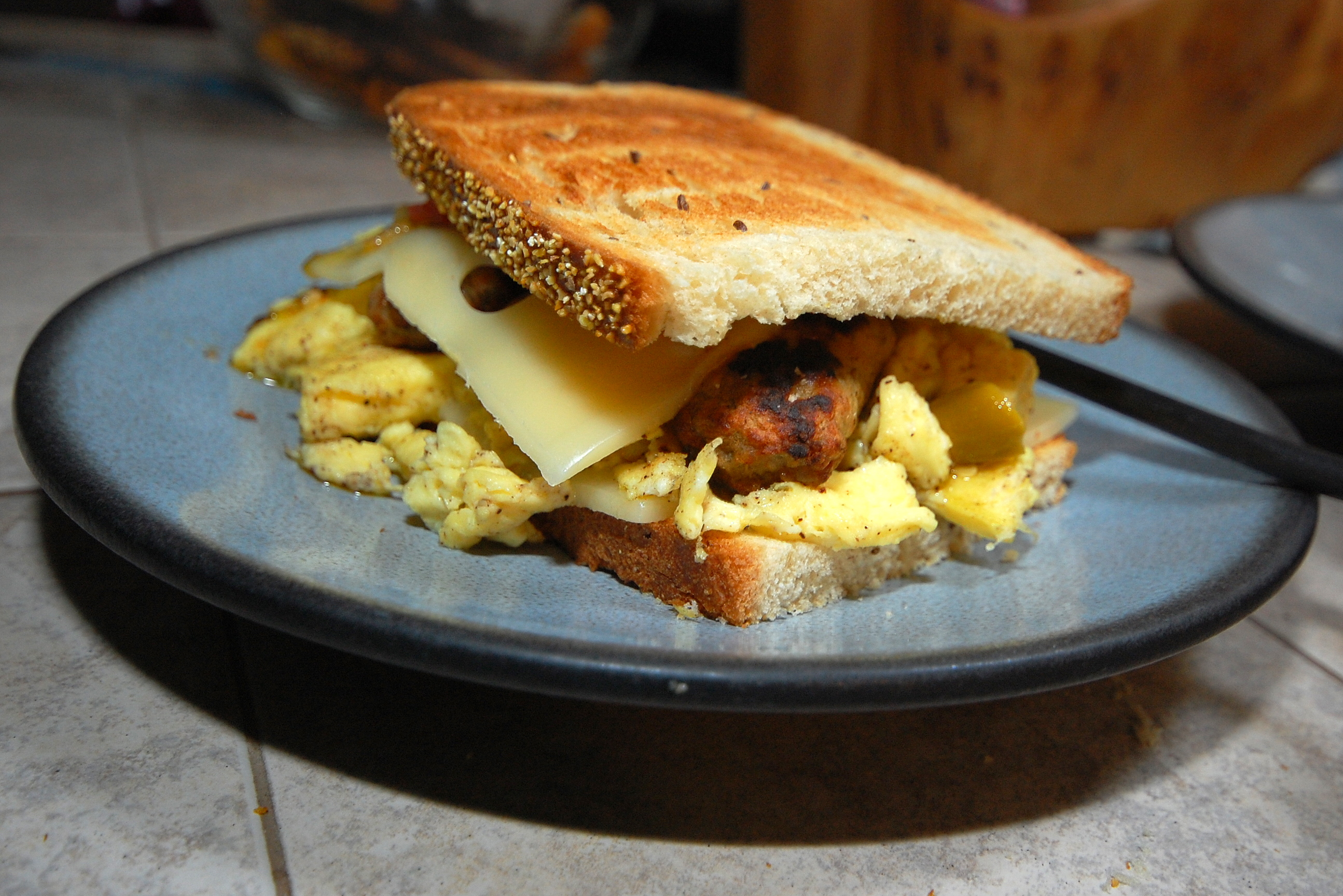
Sausage, egg and cheese breakfast sandwich

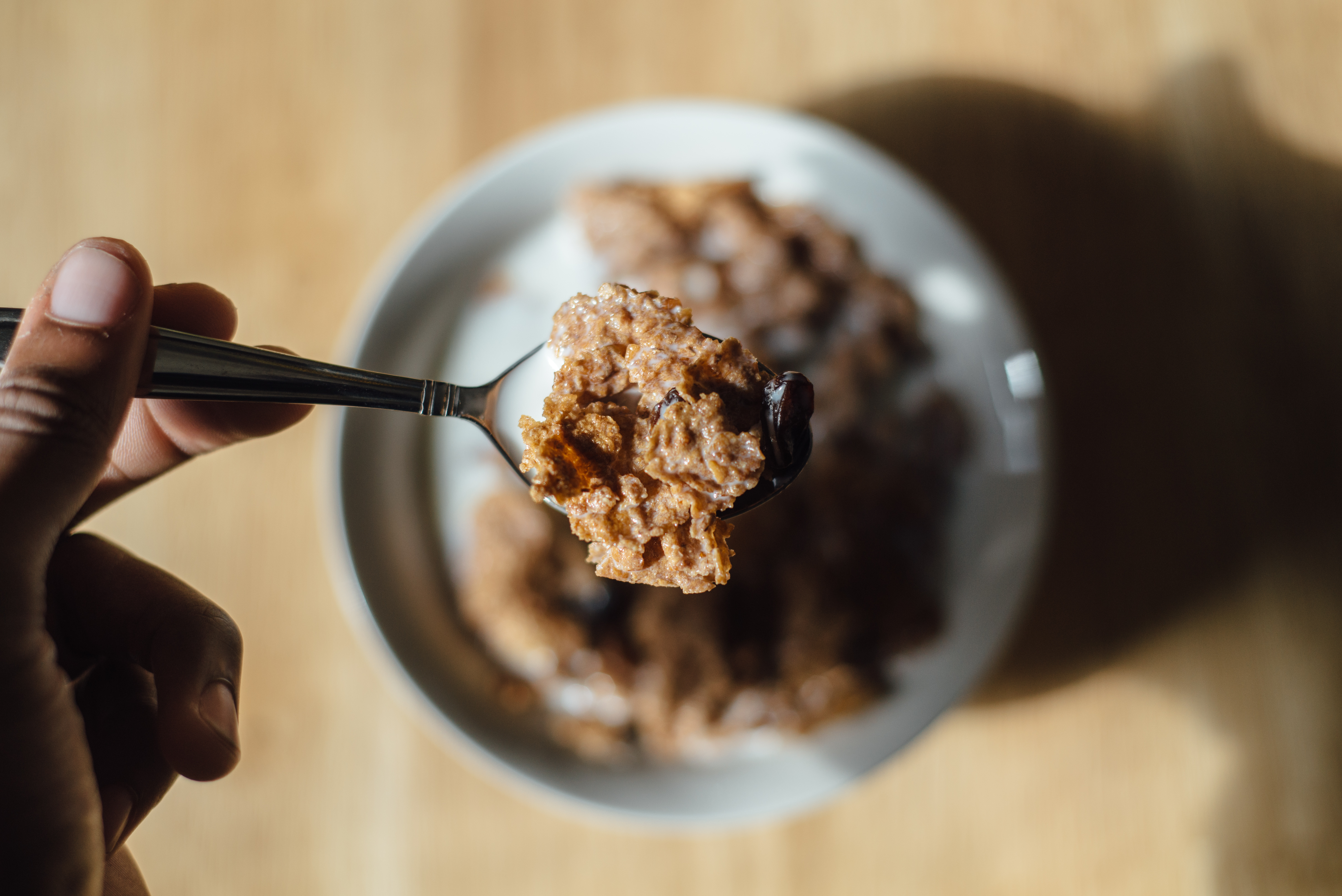
Cereal with milk

In 1620, waffles were first introduced to North America by pilgrims who had lived in the Netherlands. Later pioneers consumed largely cornmeal-based breakfasts, and would also consume meals such as oatmeal for dinner and lunch. Common breakfast products included corn pone, johnnycakes, ashcakes, hoe-cakes, and corn dodgers. Ashcakes consisted of cornmeal wrapped in cabbage leaves cooked in the ashes of a campfire, while corn pone is baked, corn dodgers are pan fried, and hoe-cakes are similar to pancakes. After the American Civil War, it became fairly common in America to eat sandwiches that were made of ham and eggs. These sandwiches were not strictly consumed in the morning. In 1897, the first true breakfast sandwich recipe was published in a cookbook. Popcorn cereal was consumed by Americans in the 1800s, which typically consisted of popcorn with milk and a sweetener. Cold breakfast cereal has been consumed by Americans since the late 1890s, and during the 1920s a considerable number of new cereals were marketed. The reason for this movement towards cold breakfast cereals was inspired by the Jacksonian-era Clean Living Movement (1830–1860). This movement focused on a lot of lifestyle changes, but specific to breakfast it claimed that eating bacon, eggs, pancakes and hot coffee was too indulgent. The first prepared cold breakfast cereal marketed to American consumers was created by Dr. John Harvey Kellogg, who introduced it in 1878 and named it granola. The product was prepared with baked wheat, oatmeal and cornmeal, and was the first brand-name breakfast cereal in the United States.

Canned fruit juice became prominent as a breakfast beverage after the discovery of vitamins. Around 1900, orange juice as a breakfast beverage was a new concept. The development of frozen orange juice concentrate began in 1915, and in the 1930s it was produced by several companies. Additionally, mass-produced tomato juice began to be marketed in the mid-1920s, and became a popular breakfast drink a few years thereafter.

==== The Caribbean ====
Haitian spaghetti is a common breakfast dish in Haitian cuisine.

== Effect on health ==
While breakfast is commonly referred to as "the most important meal of the day", some contest the positive implications of its "most important" status.

=== Scientific findings ===
Present professional opinion is largely in favor of eating breakfast, but skipping breakfast might be better than eating unhealthy foods.

Some epidemiological research indicates that having breakfast high in rapidly available carbohydrates increases the risk of metabolic syndrome.

Memory was found to be adversely affected in subjects of a study who had not eaten their breakfast (q.v. also Studies using mice under this heading). Intelligence was not affected. Children aged within 8 and 11 years were found to have differing brainwave; EEG activity states, causative to breakfast consumption. Non-breakfasting children were observed to have higher activity of upper and lower theta wave, alpha wave, and delta wave, which indicated a causative relationship of breakfast consumption to memory function in the subjects.

A review of 47 studies associating breakfast to (i) nutrition, (ii) body weight and (iii) academic performance found amongst those who had eaten breakfast: (i) better nutrition profiles, many studies found less weight (ii) irrespective of greater calorific consumption per day, although a number did not find this correlation, (iii) studies suggested a possible link to better academic performance in the breakfast eating groups (q.v. Benton and Parker 1998, under this heading).

The influence of breakfast on managing body weight is unclear.

== See also ==
- Breakfast television
- Brunch
- Food history
- Index of breakfast-related articles
- Instant breakfast
- List of breakfast beverages
- List of breakfast foods
- List of food and beverage museums
- Midnight breakfast
- Timeline of food
- Wedding breakfast

== Cited sources ==
- Albala, Ken (2002). "Hunting for Breakfast in Medieval and Early Modern Europe". In Walker, Harlan (ed.). The Meal: Proceedings of the Oxford Symposium on Food and Cookery 2001. Totnes: Prospect Books. pp. 20–30. ISBN 978-1-903018-24-8 – via University of the Pacific.
- Arndt Anderson, Heather (2013). Breakfast: A History. Rowman & Littlefield. ISBN 978-0-7591-2165-2.
- Goodhugh, William; Cooke Taylor, William, eds. (1843). The Bible Cyclopædia: Or, Illustrations of the Civil and Natural History of the Sacred Writings. Vol. 2. London.
