= Hundreds and thousands =

Hundreds and thousands is an idiomatic expression used to mean "an indefinite but emphatically large number". Although similar to and sometimes regarded as an error for "hundreds of thousands", it is in fact not so definitely large.

It is also a name for a kind of decorative confectionery consisting of tiny coloured beads of sugar, commonly used in the United Kingdom, Australia and New Zealand. Similar confections include:

- Sprinkles
- Nonpareils
- Muisjes
- DiscoDip

== See also ==
- 100000 (number), one hundred thousand
- Hundreds & Thousands, 1985 album by Bronski Beat
- Indefinite and fictitious numbers
- Fairy bread
