= Vlokken =

Dutch spread made out of chocolate

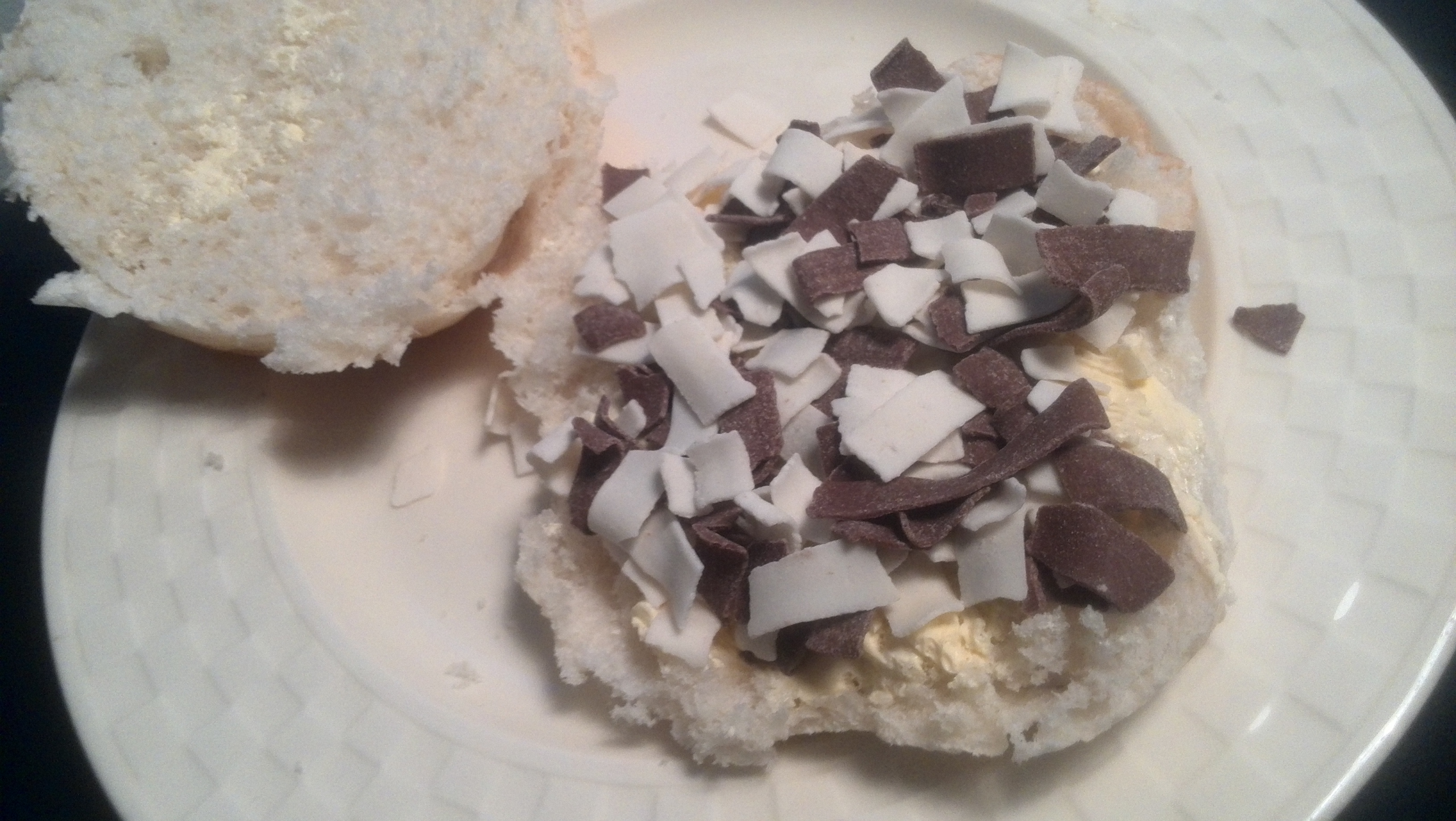
- Vlokken as sandwich topping
- Course: Mainly breakfast
- Place of origin: Netherlands
- Region or state: All across the country
- Created by: De Ruijter
- Serving temperature: Mostly as topping
- Main ingredients: Chocolate

Vlokken (Dutch for flakes), also chocoladevlokken, is a commonly used sandwich topping in the Netherlands. A vlok is made of chocolate and is curved, its size is about 0.5 cm x 2 cm x 0.1 cm. (approximately ¼" x ¾" x 40 thous)

It is sold in different chocolate flavors, including dark, milk, white and a mix of those three.

== See also ==
- Hagelslag
- Muisjes
- Nonpareils
- Sprinkles
- Pålægschokolade
- Fairy bread
