= Confetti candy =

Confectionery food

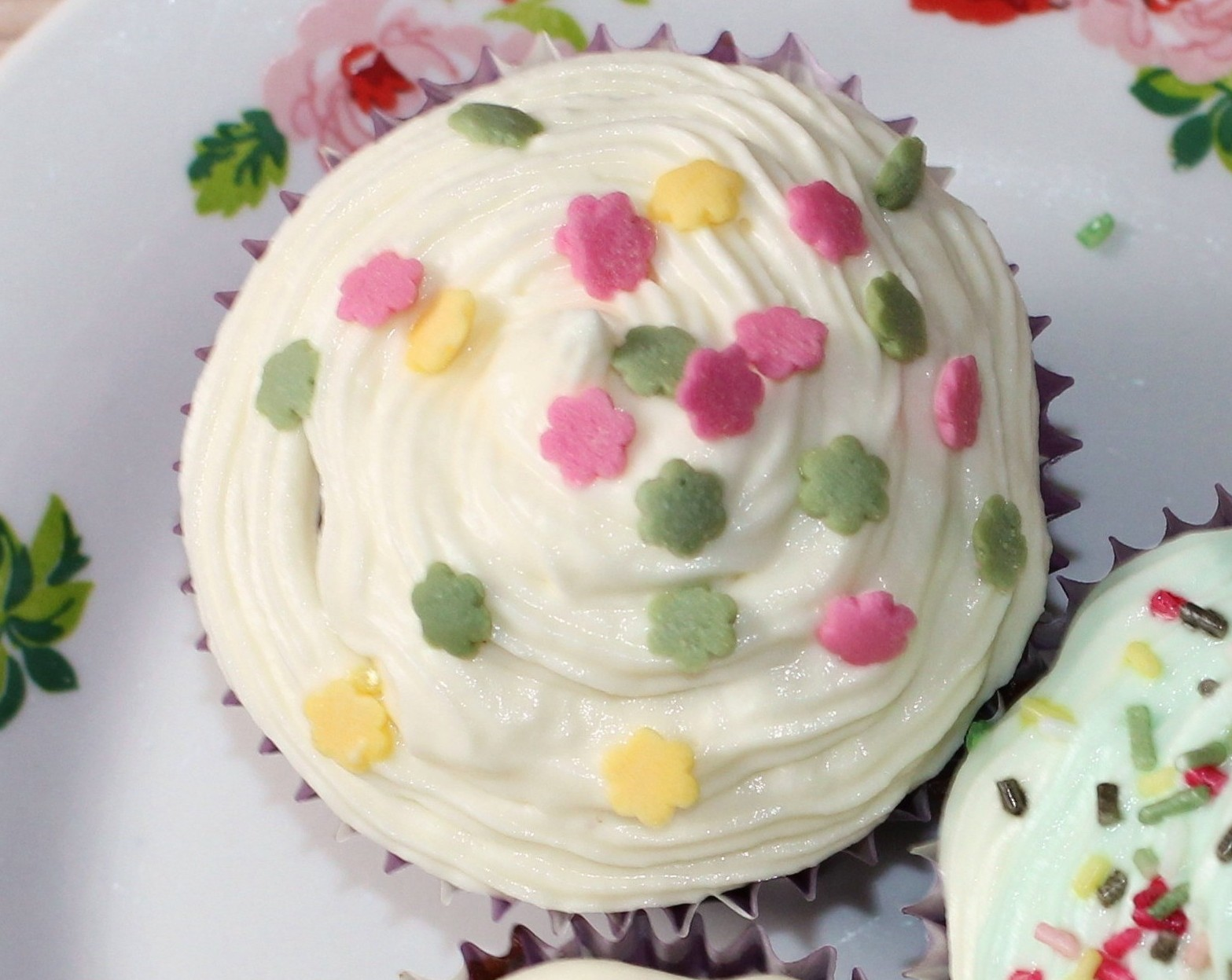
A cupcake topped with the sprinkle type of confetti candy

Confetti candy is a confectionery food product that is prepared with cooked sugar and corn syrup that is formed into sheets, cooled, and then cracked or broken into pieces. It has a hard, brittle texture. To add eye appeal, colored sugar is sometimes sprinkled atop after the cooking and shaping process has been performed.

Confetti candy, also known as confetti sprinkles, is also a confectionery that consists of flat or disc-shaped candy sprinkles. These are similar to round nonpareils, but are prepared in disc form. It is often used to decorate confectioneries and other sweets.

== See also ==
- List of candies
- Konpeitō - Japanese Confetti Candy
- Muisjes
- Peanut brittle
- Sno-Caps
- Suikerboon - Dutch variation on Confetti
