= Suikerboon =

Belgian confectionery associated with the birth or baptism of a child

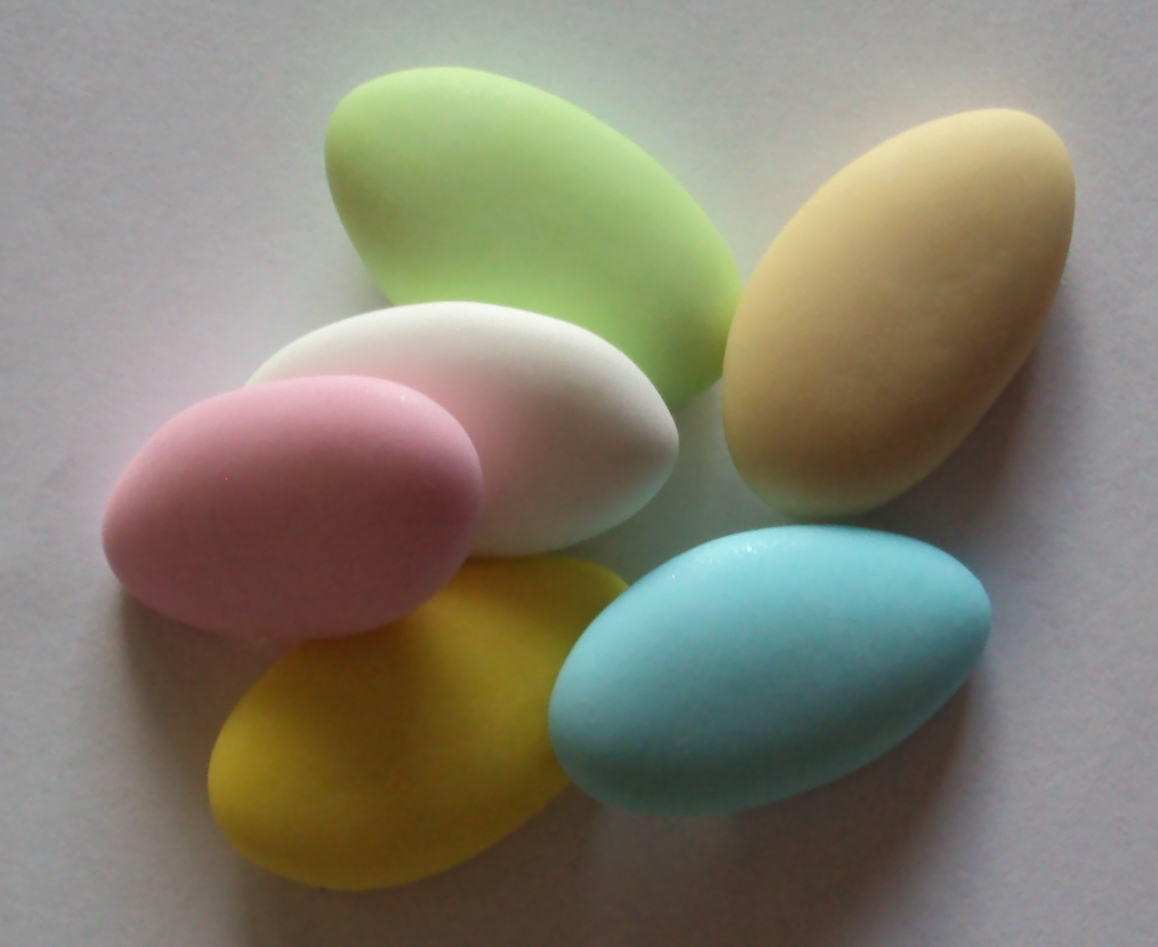
- Alternative names: Sugar bean
- Type: Confectionery
- Place of origin: Belgium
- Main ingredients: Almonds or chocolate, sugar

A suikerboon (Dutch: [ˈsœy̯.kərˌboːn]), or sugar bean, is a type of sweet traditionally given on the occasion of the birth or baptism of a child in Belgium, where they are also known as doopsuiker (Dutch: [ˈdoːpˌsœy̯.kər], literally "baptism sugar"), and parts of the Netherlands. In French, they are called dragées. They resemble Jordan almonds and Italian Confetti.

Originally sugar-coated almonds, they are now often sugar-coated chocolates of the same shape and size instead.

== See also ==
- Beschuit met muisjes
- Noghl
