= Sprinkles =

Tiny multi-colored candy topping

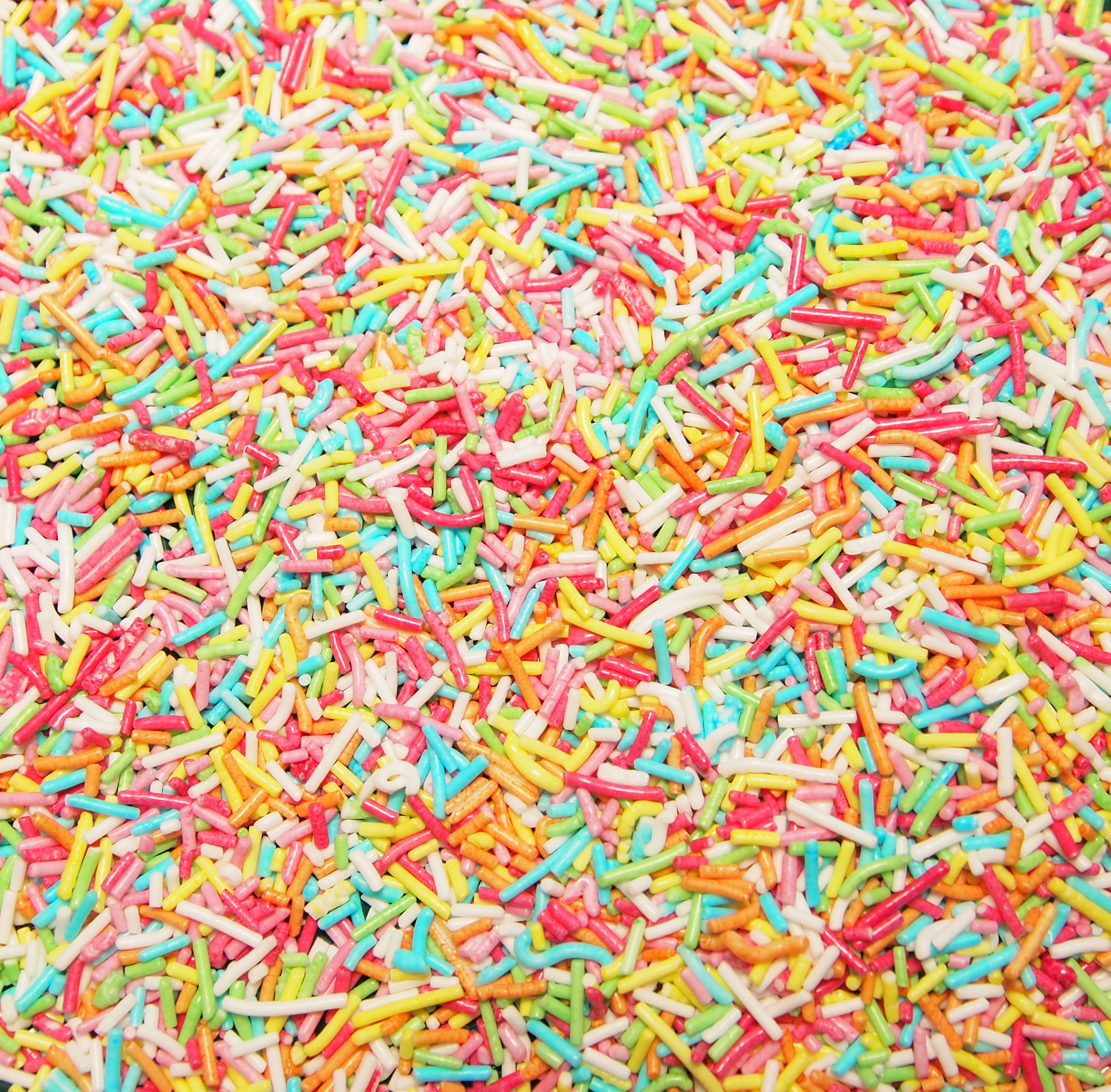
- Rainbow sprinkles
- Alternative names: Hundreds and thousands (nonpareils), jimmies, vermicelli, hagelslag (Dutch), meises (Indonesian), strössel (Swedish)
- Type: Confectionery
- Variations: Sanding Sugar, crystal sugar, nonpareils, confetti, dragées

Sprinkles (also known as hundreds and thousands and jimmies) are small pieces of confectionery used as an often colorful decoration or to add texture to desserts such as brownies, cupcakes, doughnuts or ice cream. The tiny candies are produced in a variety of colors and are generally used as a topping or a decorative element. The Dictionary of American Regional English defines them as "tiny balls or rod-shaped bits of candy used as a topping for ice-cream, cakes and other".

== Names ==
In the UK and other Anglophonic Commonwealth countries sprinkles are denoted by different signifiers. Hundreds and thousands is the most popular denotation used in United Kingdom, Australia, New Zealand and South Africa to refer to nonpareils, a type of sprinkles. Another UK variant of the term is vermicelli, especially when said of chocolate sprinkles. This name can be seen borrowed into spoken Egyptian Arabic as faːrmasil.

Jimmies is the most popular term for chocolate sprinkles in the Boston, Philadelphia, and New England regions. The origin of the name is uncertain, but it was first documented in 1930, as a topping for cake. The Just Born Candy Company of Bethlehem, Pennsylvania, claims to have invented the product and named them jimmies after an employee.

An unlikely claim on the name jimmies originates from Sidney Farber and Edward Brigham. Farber co-founded the Dana–Farber Cancer Institute in Boston, as well as a charity, The Jimmy Fund, named after one of his child patients. Brigham opened an ice cream restaurant called Brigham's and charged an extra penny for chocolate sprinkles on a cone, which benefited The Jimmy Fund. The fund however, was started in 1948, well after the first historical reference.

In Connecticut and other places in the U.S., as indicated by including the sense in the official Merriam-Webster, shots is a specific term for sprinkles.

== History ==
Nonpareils date back at least to the late 18th century, if not earlier. They were used as decoration for pièces montées and desserts.

Dutch hagelslag (chocolate sprinkles) were invented in 1913 by Erven H. de Jong from Wormerveer. Venz, another Dutch company, made hagelslag popular. Hagelslag is used on bread and other things made of bread. Most of the time butter is spread out so the hagelslag does not fall off. After much research and venture, Gerard de Vries and Venz created the first machine to produce the tiny cylindrical treats. They were named hagelslag after their resemblance to a weather phenomenon prominent in the Netherlands: hail. (This reference is also transferred to the Finnish word for sprinkles, koristerakeet which literally means "decorative hail"). Only hagelslag with a cacao percentage of more than 32% can bear the name chocoladehagelslag (chocolate sprinkles). If it is lower than 32%, it is to be referred to as cacaofantasie or cacaofantasie hagelslag (cacao fantasy sprinkles).

The American candy company Just Born cites its founder, Sam Born, as inventing the "chocolate" sprinkles called "jimmies" (which might never have contained any chocolate) in Brooklyn, New York. However, advertisements for chocolate sprinkles as a confection exist in the United States as far back as 1921, predating Just Born by two years.

A related product, sanding sugar has been commercially available in a small range of colors for decades. Now it comes in a wide variety, including black and metallic-like "glitter".

== Types ==
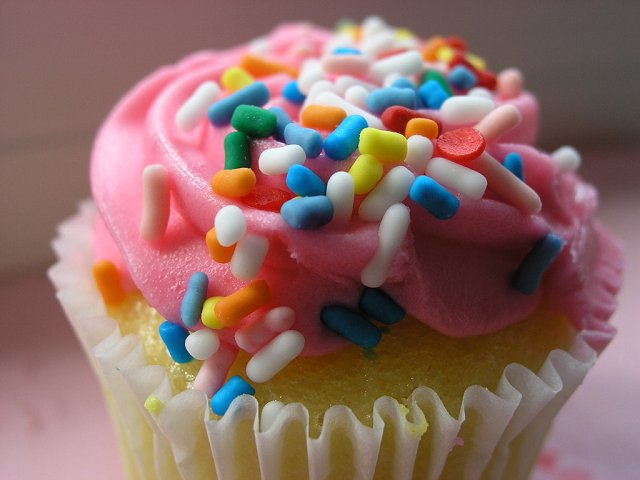
A pink cupcake with colored sprinkles

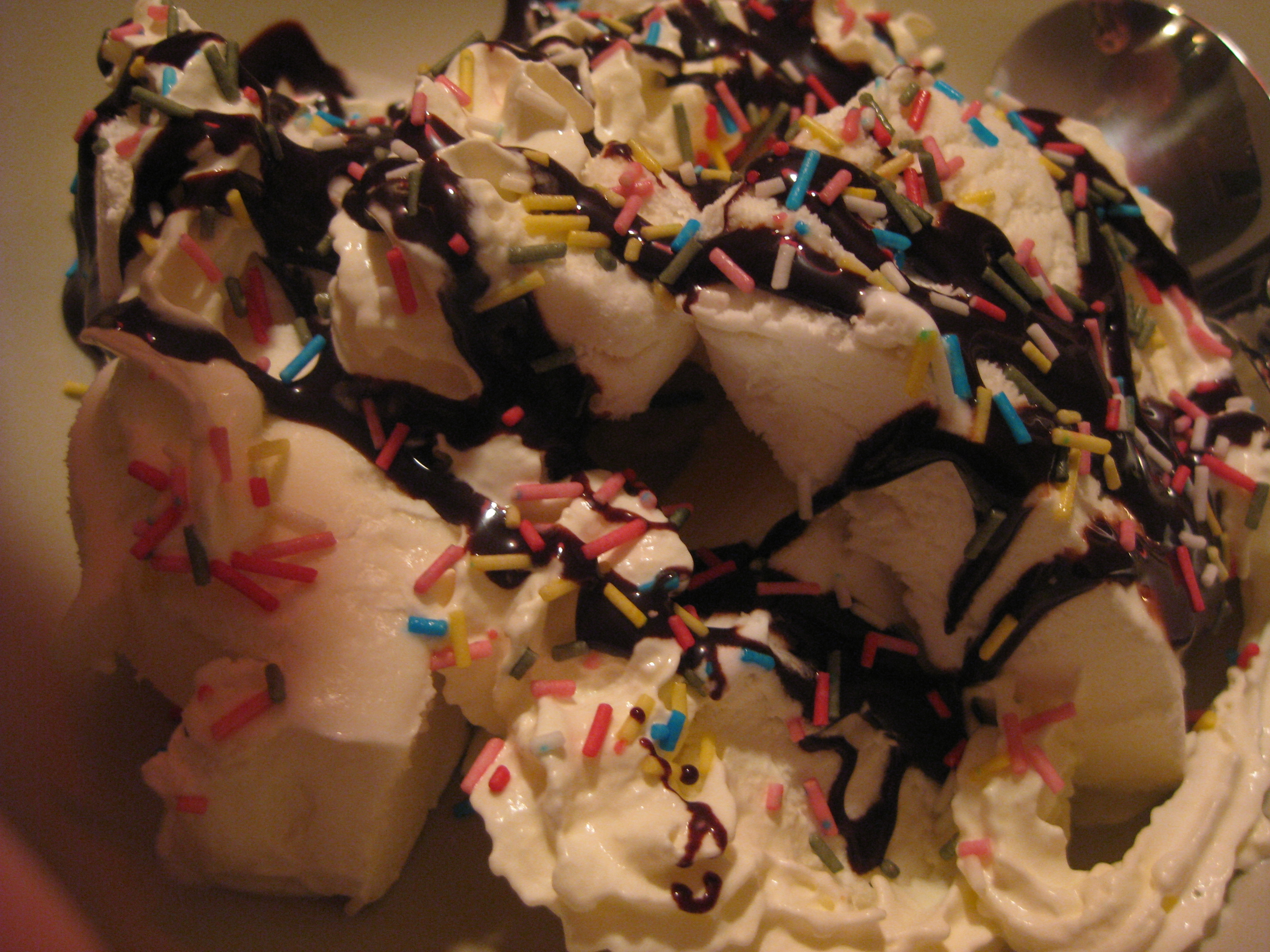
Colored sprinkles, chocolate syrup and whipped cream on top of ice cream

Popular terminology for this confection tends to overlap, while manufacturers are more precise with their labeling. What consumers often call "sprinkles" covers several types of candy decorations that are sprinkled randomly over a surface, as opposed to decorations that are placed in specific spots. Nonpareils (hundreds-and-thousands), confetti, silver, gold, and pearl dragées, pearl sugar and "sugar shapes" (sequins) are all used this way.

Sanding sugar is a transparent crystal sugar of larger size than general-use refined white sugar. Crystal sugar tends to be clear and of much larger crystals than sanding sugar. Pearl sugar is relatively large, opaque white spheroids of sugar. Both crystal and pearl sugars are typically used for sprinkling on sweet breads, pastries, and cookies in many countries.

Some American manufacturers deem the elongated opaque sprinkles the official sprinkles. In British English, these are sugar strands. In the New England region of United States, as well as in Philadelphia, sprinkles are often referred to as jimmies. "Jimmies", in this sense, are usually considered to be used as an ice cream topping, while sprinkles are for decorating baked goods, but the term can be used for both.

The sprinkles known as nonpareils in French are tiny opaque spheres that were traditionally white, but that now come in many colors; in Commonwealth countries such as the United Kingdom, Australia and New Zealand, these are known as "hundreds and thousands".

The sprinkle-type of dragée (also known as a "cachou") is like a large nonpareil with a metallic coating of silver, gold, copper, or bronze. The food-sprinkle dragée is now also made in a form resembling pearls.

"Sugar shapes" ("sequins") are a newer product which come in a variety of shapes, often flavored, for holidays or themes, such as Halloween witches and pumpkins, or flowers and dinosaurs. Candy cane shapes may taste like peppermint, and gingerbread men like gingerbread cookies.

Toppings that are more similar in consistency to another type of candy, even if used similarly to sprinkles, are usually known by a variation of that candy's name—for example, mini-chocolate chips or praline.

== Uses ==
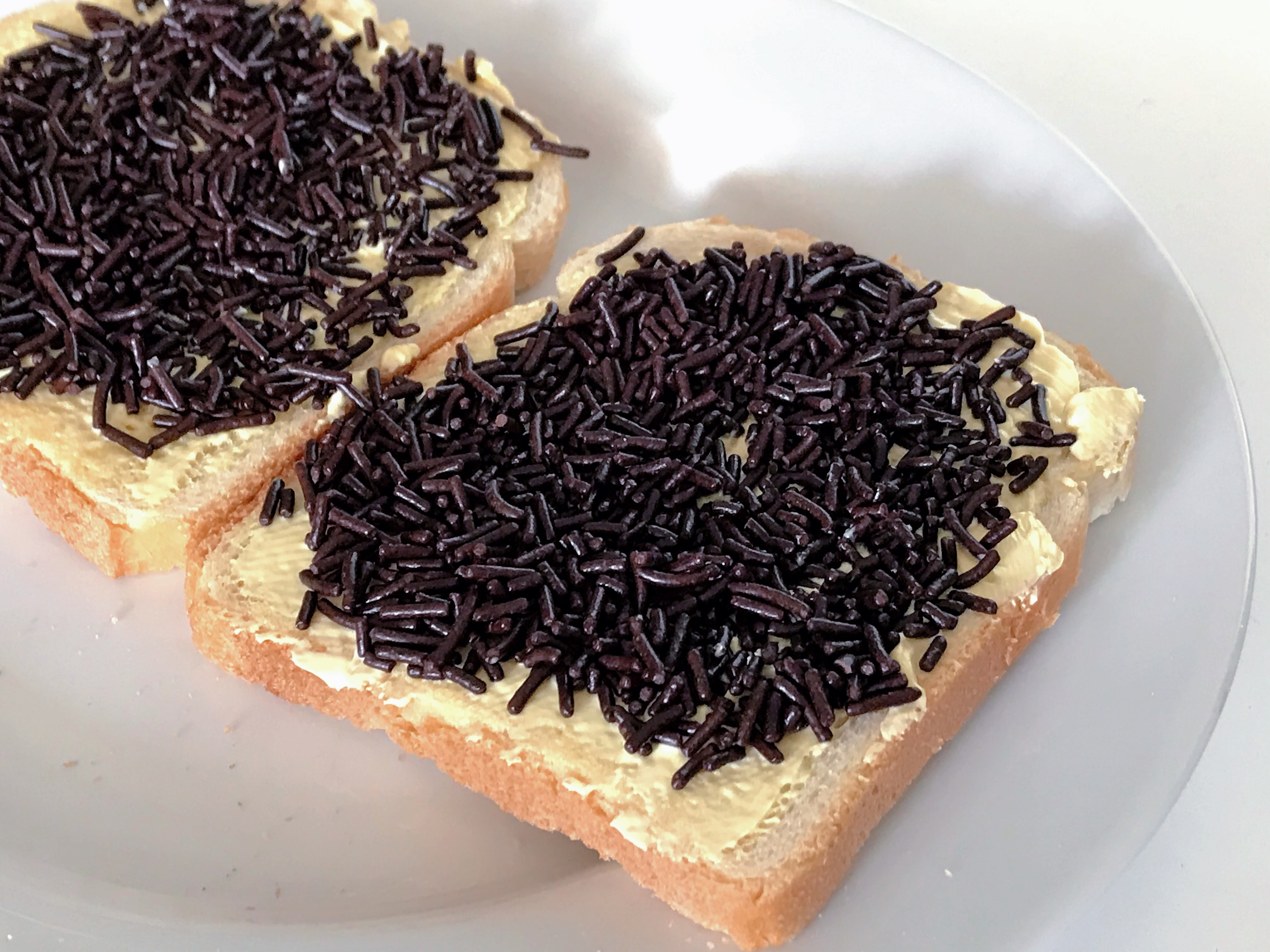
In the Netherlands black chocolate sprinkles (called chocoladehagelslag) are commonly used as a sandwich topping.

In the Netherlands, chocoladehagelslag (chocolate sprinkles) is used as a sandwich topping (similar to muisjes and vlokken); this is also common in Belgium and the former colonies of the Netherlands, Suriname and Indonesia. These countries also use vruchtenhagel and anijshagel (made of sugar and fruit/anise-flavour respectively) on sandwiches (mainly at breakfast). In Indonesia, it is commonly known as meses or meises, presumably derived from the Dutch muisjes, which are also similar. In Belgium it is often called muizenstrontjes (mouse droppings), due to the resemblance. Chocolate sprinkles are also used in brigadeiro, a Brazilian traditional dessert.

Fairy bread is the name given to the children's treat of nonpareils ("hundreds and thousands") on buttered white bread. Fairy bread is commonly served at children's parties in Australia and New Zealand.

A dessert called confetti cake has sprinkles mixed with the batter, where they dissolve and form little colored spots, giving the appearance of confetti. Confetti cakes are popular for children's birthdays in the United States. The Pillsbury Company sells its own variation known as "Funfetti" cake, incorporating a sprinkle-like substance into the mix.

== See also ==
- Comfit
- Confetti candy
- Fondant icing
