= Dragée =

Confectionery

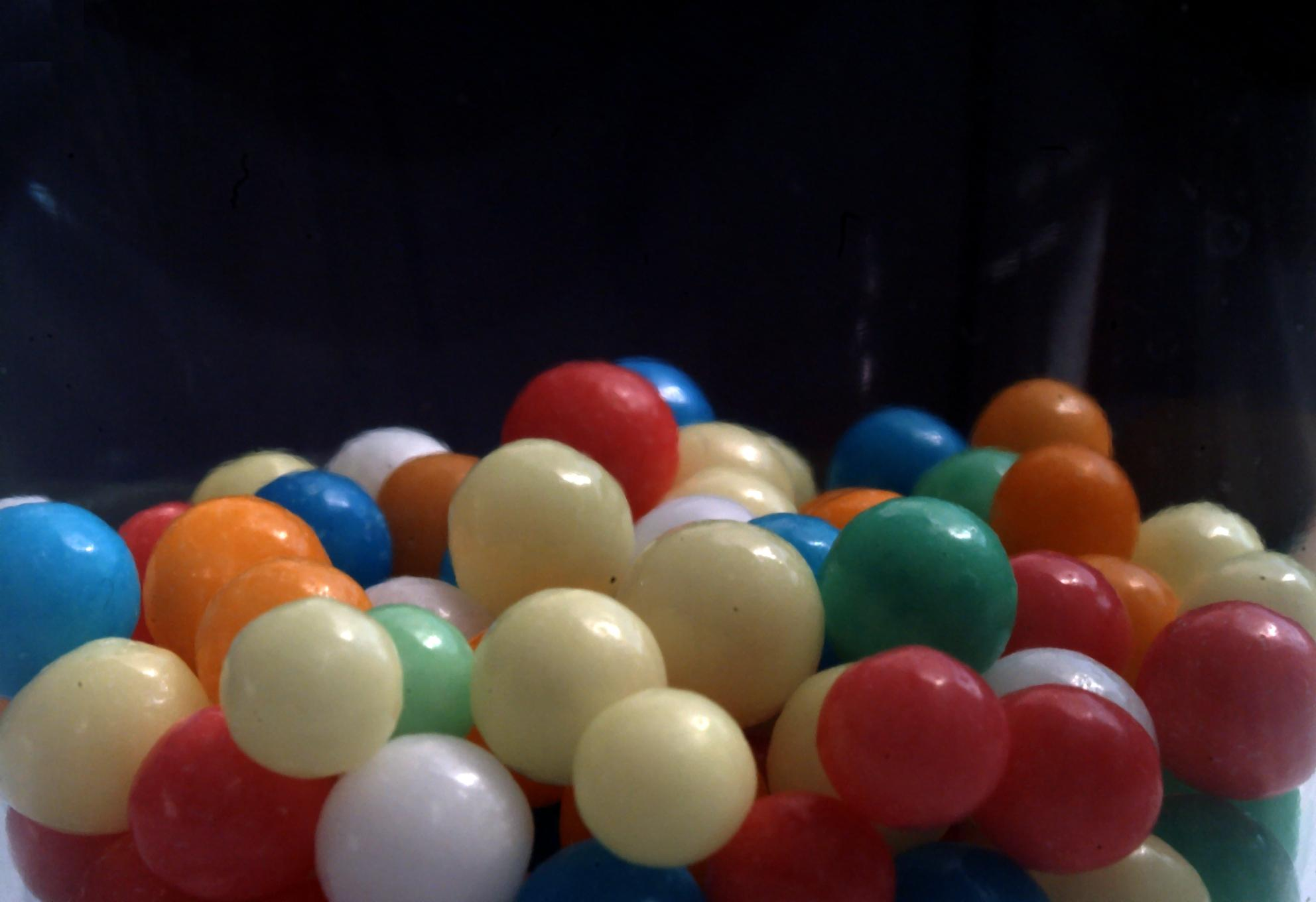
- A form of dragée: Liebesperlen ('love pearls')
- Type: Confectionery

A dragée (/dræˈʒeɪ/ drazh-AY, UK also /ˈdrɑːʒeɪ/ DRAH-zhay, US also /drɑːˈʒeɪ/ drah-ZHAY; French: [dʁaʒe]) (Note: from Ancient Greek τραγήματα (tragḗmata) 'dried fruits; sweets, treats' (cf. τρώγω trṓgō 'to eat'), through Latin tragēmata 'sweets' and then French dragée 'sweet with almond filling'.) is a bite-sized piece of confectionery with a hard outer shell. Dragées come in various shapes and sizes and are often used for decorative purposes, particularly in pastries and desserts. They are also popular as a type of candy, with the coating providing a sweet or flavorful contrast to the center.

Historically, dragées were sometimes made with medicinal ingredients, but today they are primarily eaten as a sweet treat.

== Varieties ==
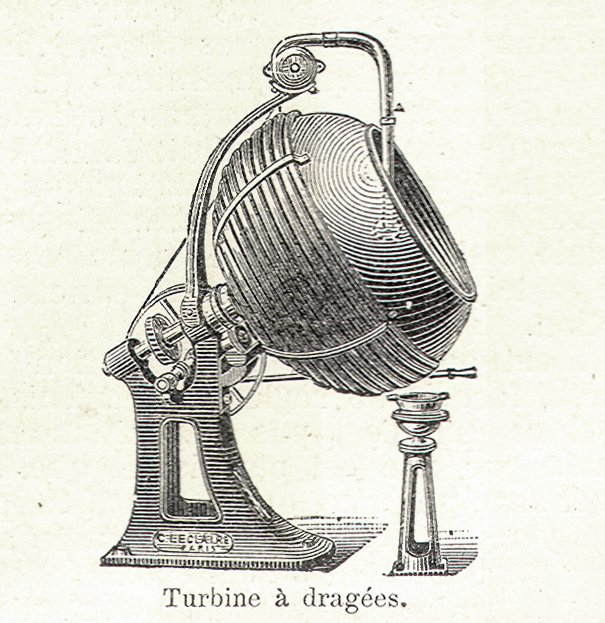
Spinner (turbine) used to apply sugar to the candies

=== Almonds ===
==== Jordan almonds ====
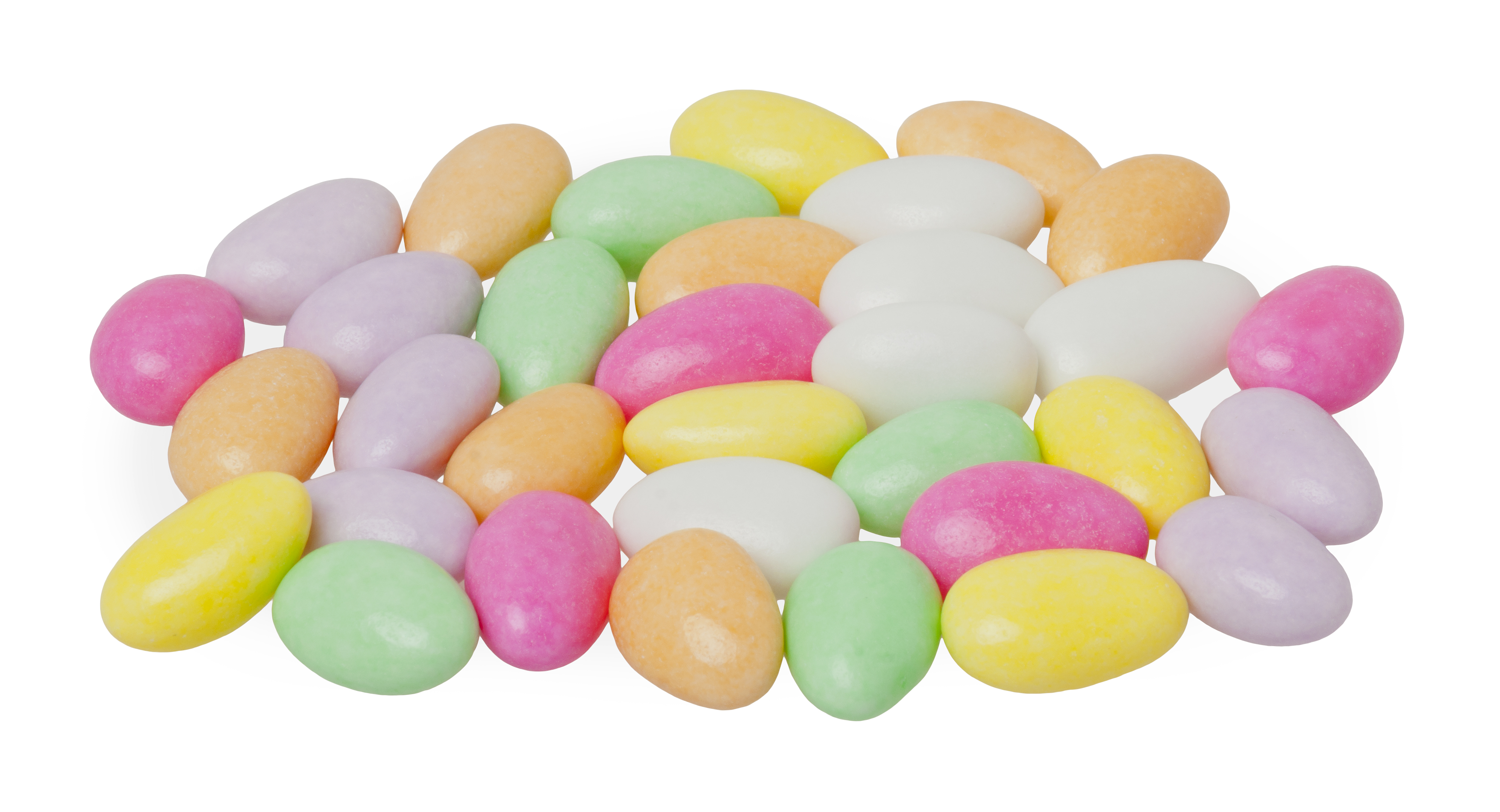
Classic Jordan almonds

Jordan almonds, also known as koufeta, consist of almonds which are sugar-panned in various pastel colors. Jordan almonds are often offered as wedding favors contained in bonbonnieres.. The treats are often packaged in groups of five to represent happiness, health, longevity, wealth, and fertility.

The term Jordan is most likely a corrupted version of the French word jardin, meaning 'garden', hence, a cultivated rather than wild almond. However, others suggest the term referred to a variety of almonds originally grown along the Jordan River characterized by long, thin, slender, rather smooth kernels in thick, heavy shells.

==== Dragati ====
Jordan almonds are thought to be derived from the honey-covered almonds consumed in ancient Rome. According to an unverified legend, a Roman confectioner named Julius Dragatus served honey-covered almonds called dragati at weddings and births. When sugar became more readily available in the 15th century, the nuts were coated in sugar instead.

==== Dragées de Verdun ====
The town of Verdun in the northeast of France became known for its dragées de Verdun. Some believe that Jordan is a corruption of the name of the town.

==== Amêndoas de Páscoa ====
In Portugal, sugar-coated almonds (amêndoas de Páscoa) are the most traditional treat and gift rather than chocolate eggs. Entire aisles in supermarkets may be devoted to them in the run-up to Easter itself.

==== Confetti di Sulmona ====
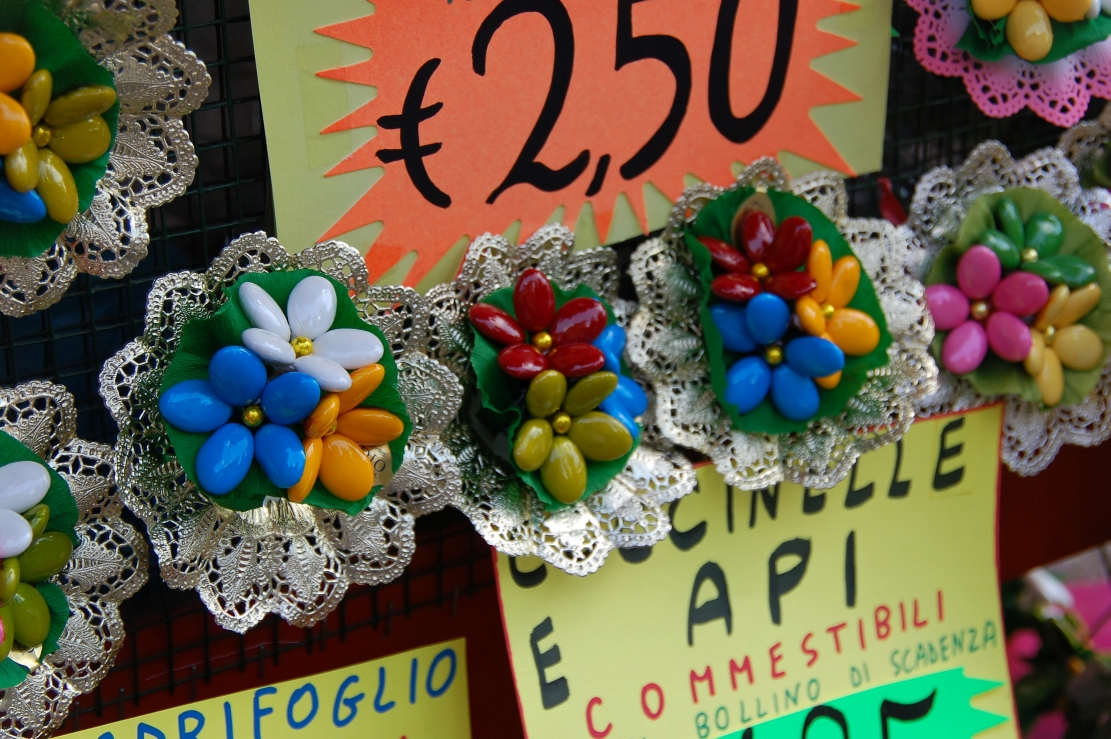
Confetti di Sulmona as edible decorations

Confetti di Sulmona are a variety used in decorative arrangements in Sulmona, in the Italian province of L'Aquila, Abruzzo.

=== Chocolate ===
Suikerboon were originally made with almonds, and now more commonly with chocolate.

Other chocolate dragées with candy shells appeared as Smarties, designed to allow easy transport and consumption of chocolate in England and Europe during the 1930s that were available among troops during the Spanish Civil War and eventually inspired the M&M's the U.S. military contracted for during the Second World War. They have evolved into a popular multi-colored candy and are sold as decorative dragées in 25 different colors.

=== Decorative sugar balls ===
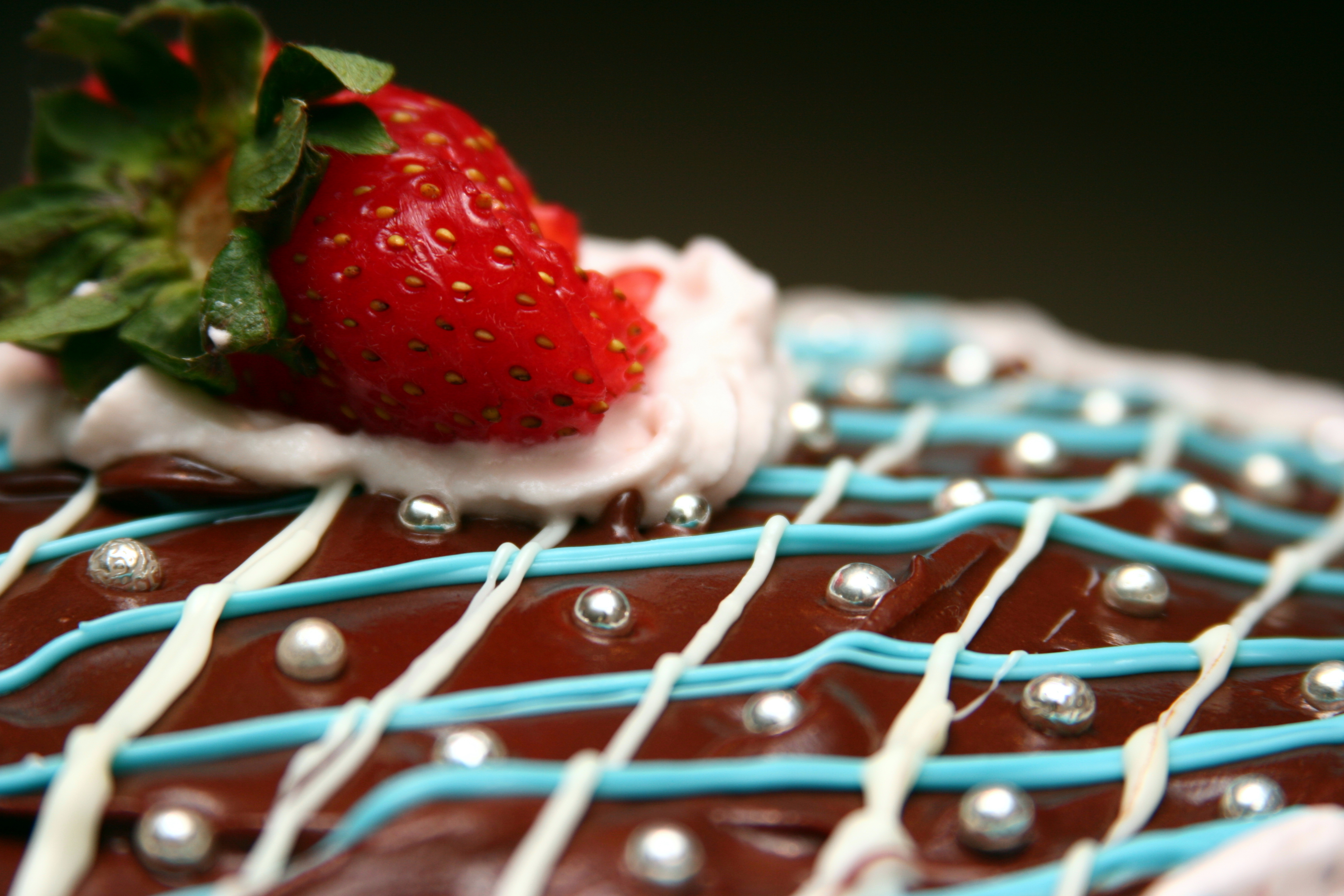
A chocolate cake decorated with icing, strawberries, and silver metallic dragées

Another form of dragée is a small sphere of sugar, in the Commonwealth often called a cachou, used primarily in the decoration of cookies, cakes, and other forms of confectionery. These are produced in various sizes, typically 3 to 4 mm (0.12 to 0.16 in) in diameter. This is larger than nonpareils and smaller than large pearl tapioca.

In most countries, including the United Kingdom and France, silver dragées are classified as food items. However, since 1906, U.S. regulations have prohibited the manufacture or sale of any food that uses any metal or mineral substance—including silver—as a food coloring, coating, or additive. The U.S. Food and Drug Administration considers the silver and gold metallic-finish sugar dragées to be inedible, and they may be sold only when accompanied with a notice that they are to be used for decorative purposes only. Almonds that have been coated the same way are not permitted at all. Numerous defendants in the United States confectionery industry settled a 2003 lawsuit alleging the presence of metallic silver in dragées.

=== Medicinal dragées ===
Used to increase the palatability of bitter medication, medicated candies or sugar-coated pills can be referred to as dragées.

== See also ==
- Candied almonds
- Chocolate-covered almonds
- List of almond dishes
- Sprinkles
- Sugar plum
- Sugar candy
- Noghl

== Sources ==
- Dictionnaire de Français Larousse (1996). ISBN 2-03-320222-4
- Richardson, Tim (2002), Sweets: A History of Candy, Bloomsbury. ISBN 1-58234-307-1
