= Noghl =

Sugar-coated almonds

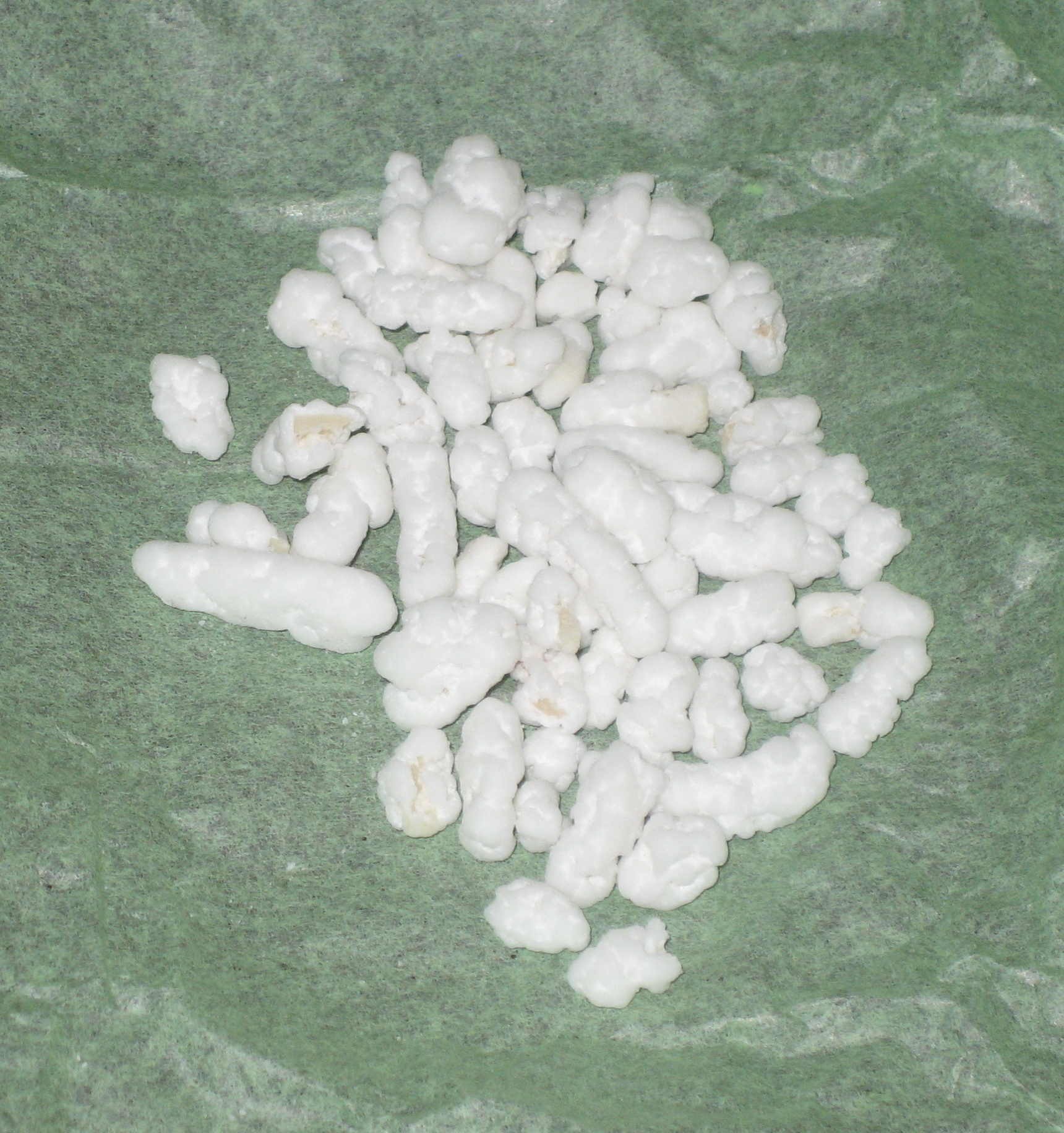
- Almond noghl
- Alternative names: Nuql, sugar-coated almonds
- Type: Confectionery
- Place of origin: Persia
- Region or state: Urmia, Iran and Afghanistan
- Main ingredients: Almonds or other nuts, sugar, water, rose water

Noghl (Iranian Persian) or Nuql (Dari) (Persian: نقل), also Mlabbas (Syrian Arabic) (Arabic: ملبس), are sugar-coated almonds, a traditional Iranian and Afghan confection. It is made by boiling sugar with water and rose water and then coating roasted almonds in the mixture. It can also be made with other nuts such as walnuts or others. Noghl is often eaten with tea.

Noghl is often included in Iranian and Afghan weddings, which are based on ancient Persian / Afghan ceremonies. As part of the wedding celebration, a lavish spread of food is prepared at the home of the bride. Included is an assortment of pastries and sweets, including noghl, which is typically paid for by the groom. In many places in both Iran and Afghanistan, Noghl is showered on the bride and groom, much like confetti would be in Western countries.

== See also ==
- Dragée
- List of almond dishes
- Suikerboon
- Chickpea noghl
