= Fairy bread =

Children's party food

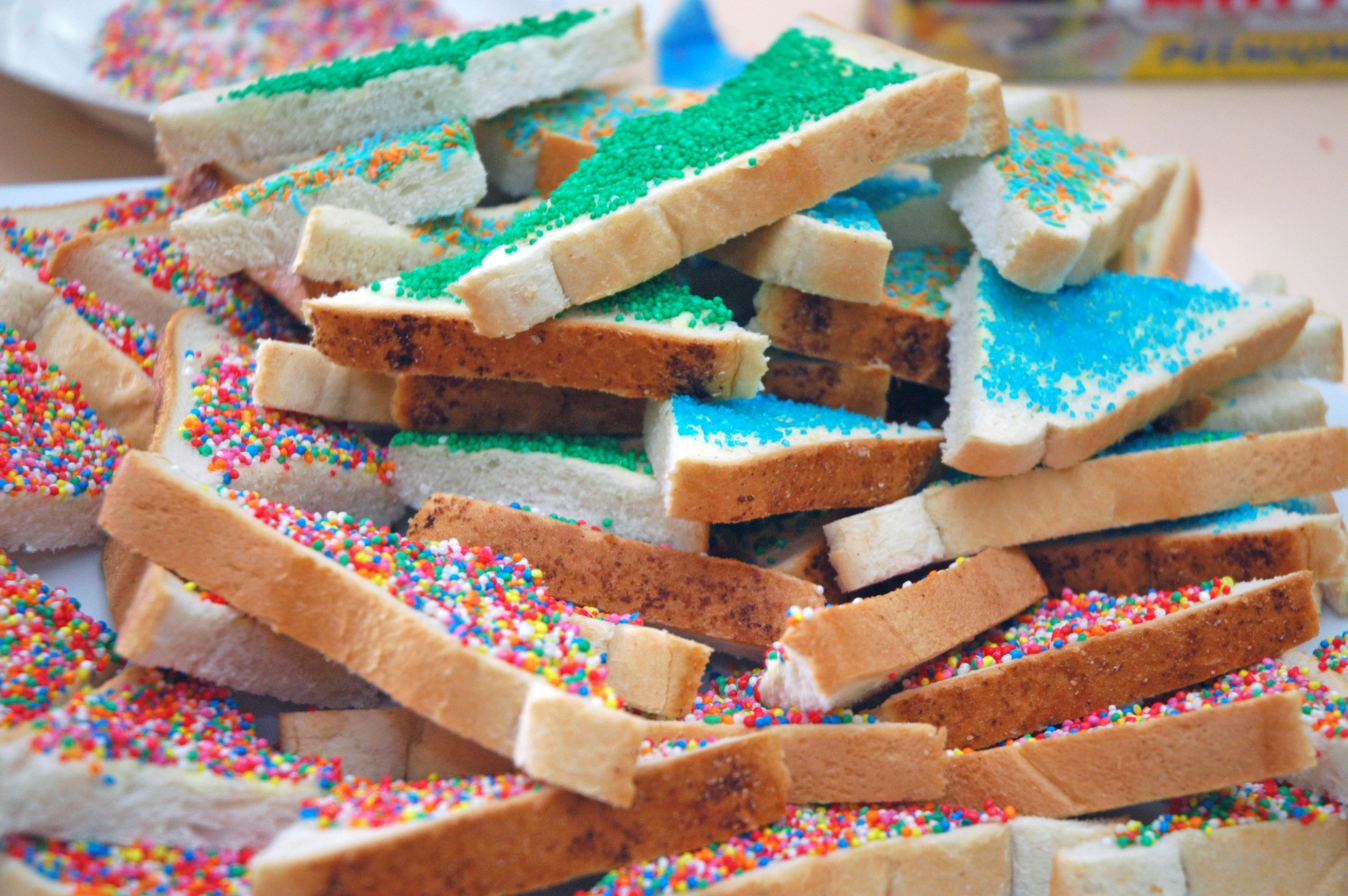
- Type: White bread
- Region or state: Australia, New Zealand
- Serving temperature: Cold
- Main ingredients: White bread, butter, Hundreds and Thousands (sprinkles)

Fairy bread is sliced white bread spread with butter or margarine and covered with hundreds and thousands (colourful round sprinkles), often served at children's parties in Australia and New Zealand. It is typically cut into triangles. It is similar to the Dutch Hagelslag, which are normally oblong, chocolate sprinkles a few millimetres long but can also be fruit flavoured (vruchtenhagel) served on buttered white bread. The flavour of fairy bread has been compared to Funfetti cake.

== History ==
Although people had been putting hundreds and thousands (or nonpareils) on bread and butter for some time, the first known reference to this dish as "fairy bread" was in the Hobart Mercury in April 1929. Referring to a party for child inmates of the Consumptive Sanitorium, the article proclaimed that "The children will start their party with fairy bread and butter and 100s and 1,000s, and cakes, tarts, and home-made cakes..."

The origin of the term is not known, but it may come from the poem 'Fairy Bread' in Robert Louis Stevenson's A Child's Garden of Verses published in 1885, and had been used for a number of different food items before the current usage.

In April 2021, the satirical group The Chaser created a fabricated online petition calling for the renaming of fairy bread, calling it "offensive", (Note: In Australia and New Zealand, "fairy" is also used as a homophobic slur for a gay man. The joke is a parody on the controversial renaming of several Australian products (such as Chicos (renamed Cheekies), Coon (named after Edward William Coon, renamed Cheer) and Redskins (renamed Red Ripperz). These changes were widely perceived by many Australians as political correctness.) which resulted in many mainstream news stories.

In November 2021, a Google Doodle was created to celebrate fairy bread.

In 2024 rumours surfaced that fairy bread, along with smiley fritz, had been banned from South Australian schools. The SA Education Department subsequently released a statement that this was not the case and that their new guidelines for school canteens were optional.

== See also ==
- Muisjes, sugar coated anise seeds served on bread
- Vlokken, curved chocolate flakes used as a topping
- List of bread dishes
