= Beschuit met muisjes (play) =

Play written by Herman Heijermans

Beschuit met muisjes is a tragicomedy by Dutch playwright Herman Heijermans. First performed on 24 December 1910 in Amsterdam, it is one of Heijermans' lesser-known plays.

== Plot ==
The play follows the family of Prosper Bien Aime, who own a run-down pension. Their lives are turned upside down when Prosper's estranged brother unexpectedly shows up and dies at the dinner table, leaving the others to sort out what to do with his sizable inheritance. Another unexpected guest, the brother's wife Pollie, disturbs these plans, especially when it turns out she's pregnant (leading Prosper to call for beschuit met muisjes, a traditional Dutch snack served when babies are born).

== Performances ==
The play has been performed by Amsterdam company Toneelgroep Oostpool (and its predecessor, Toneelgroep Theater). In 2014 Oostpool presented the play on the occasion of the 150th anniversary of Heijermans' birth, in a performance praised in de Volkskrant. A review by Henri Drost for the Theaterkrant was strongly negative, and said the strong text deserved a better production.
