= Nonpareils =

Tiny spherical multi-colored confection topping

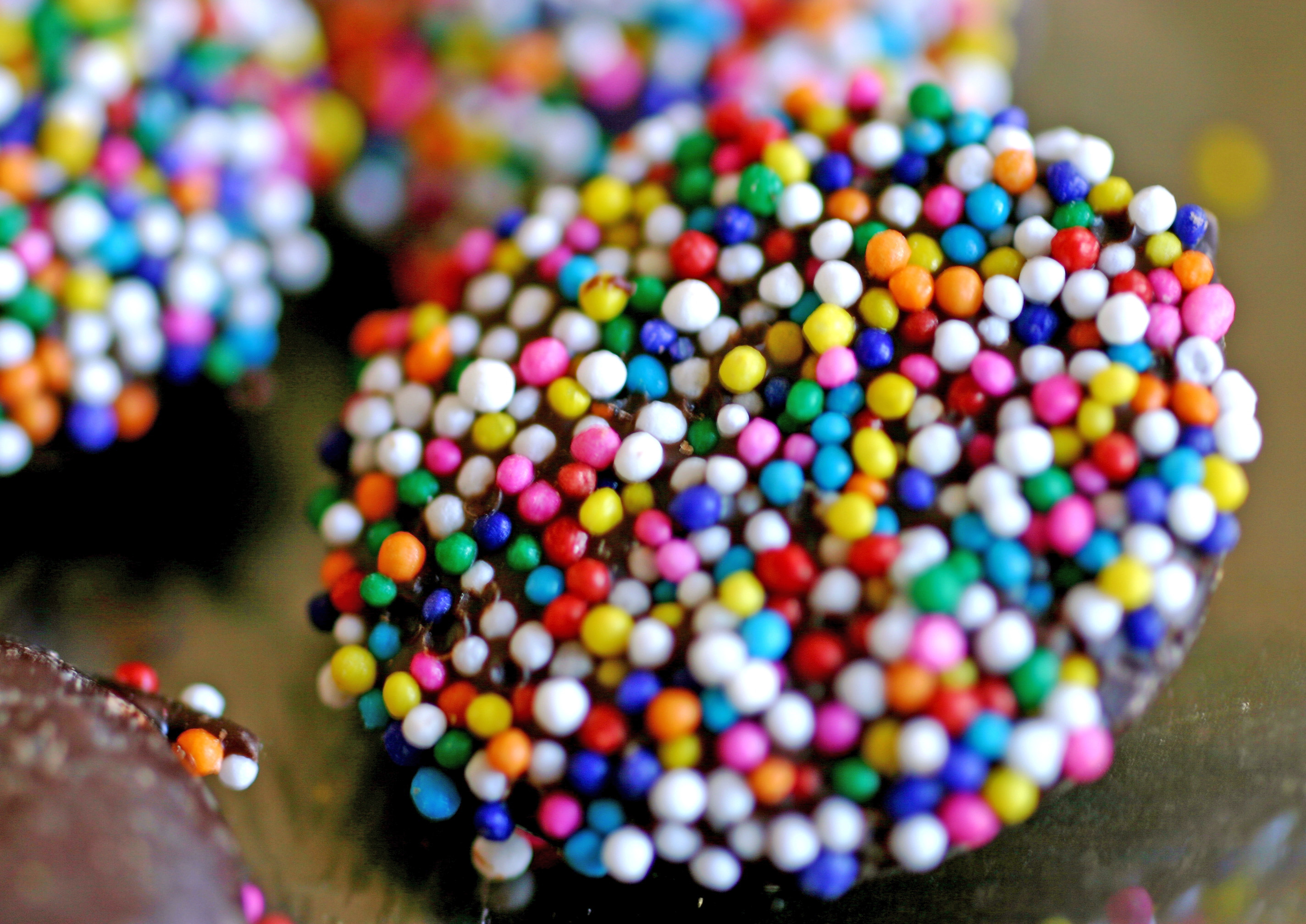
- Multicolor nonpareil balls coating the top of a chocolate nonpareil
- Alternative names: Sprinkles (US and Canada); Jazzies (UK); Hundreds and thousands (UK, Canada, South Africa, Australia and New Zealand); Freckles (UK, Australia and New Zealand)
- Type: Confectionery
- Main ingredients: Sugar, starch, food coloring

Nonpareils are a decorative confection of tiny balls made with sugar and starch, traditionally an opaque white but now available in many colors. They are also known as hundreds and thousands in Australia, New Zealand, South Africa, and the United Kingdom. In the United States, the same confectionery topping would generally be referred to among the general public as "sprinkles" regardless of their composition.

The term nonpareil also may refer to a specific confection, made using nonpareils – namely, discs of chocolate coated with nonpareils, which also are known as chocolate nonpareils, freckles, or jazzies.

== History ==
Their origin is uncertain, but they may have evolved out of the pharmaceutical use of sugar, as they were a miniature version of comfits. The French name has been interpreted to mean they were "without equal" for intricate decoration of cakes, desserts, and other sweets, and for the elaborate pièces montées constructed as table ornaments.

Nonpareils can be traced back to 17th century French recipes, highlighting the use of "nonpareils" as an alternative topping to sugar. Diablotins ("little devils") were small chocolate pieces covered in nonpareils; they had been made since the 18th century and were perhaps among the first chocolate sweets.

An 18th-century American recipe for a frosted wedding cake calls for nonpareils as decoration. By the early 19th century, colored nonpareils seem to have been available in the U.S. The popular cookbook author Eliza Leslie suggests the use of red and green nonpareils for decorating a Queen cake, but strongly suggests white nonpareils are most suitable for pink icing on a pound cake in her 1828 Seventy-five Receipts for Pastries, Cakes and Sweetmeats.

In 1844, Eleanor Parkinson, of a well-known Philadelphia family of professional confectioners, first published her book The Complete Confectioner, in which she described how to make nonpareils following her comfit-making procedure, which involved multiple hot pots and hot syrup.

Görlitz, Germany was the birthplace of the German version of nonpareils, popularly known in Germany as Liebesperlen (German: love pearls). Invented by confectioner Rudolf Hoinkis (1876–1944), the name derives from a conversation Hoinkis had with his wife, proclaiming he loved her like these "pearls", the nonpareil. Unsure of what to call the treat he invented, his wife suggested calling them love pearls, and the name stuck. The factory where he first manufactured the treat, founded in 1896, is now run by his great-grandson, Mathias.

== Different types ==
Candy-covered anise seeds called muisjes, sometimes mistaken for traditional nonpareils, are sometimes offered at breakfast in the Netherlands to be served on bread and butter. They are, however, usually served on rusk to celebrate the birth of a child. This is known as "beschuit met muisjes".

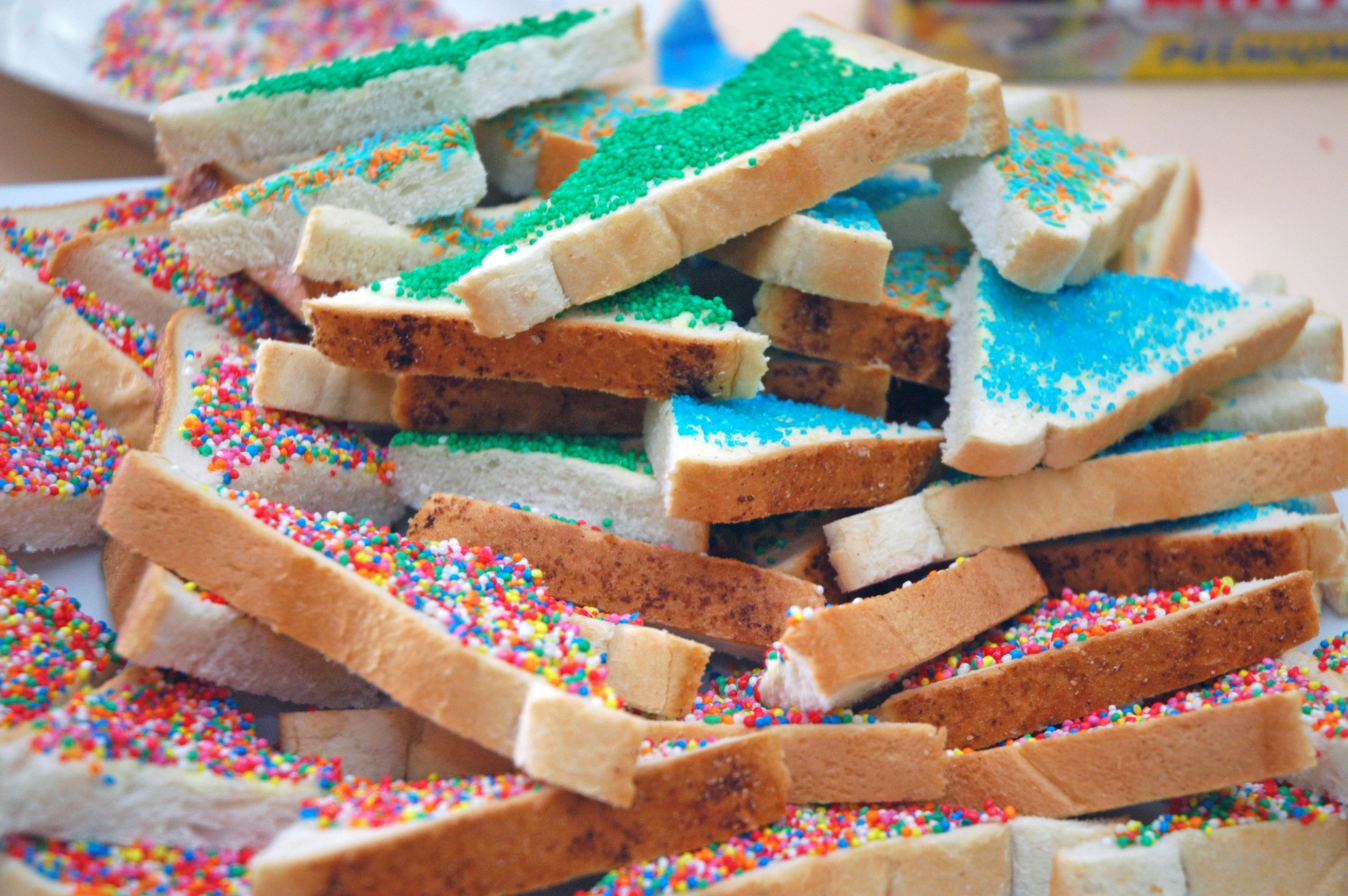
Fairy bread: nonpareils on sliced buttered bread

In Australia and New Zealand, as well as South Africa and the UK, spherical nonpareils are known as "hundreds-and-thousands". In Australia and New Zealand, they are often used to decorate cup cakes (patty cakes) or toffee, or on buttered white bread triangles as fairy bread, for children's birthday parties. The Canadian company Mondoux sells them as "Yummies".

In the United States, traditional nonpareils gave way for most purposes by the mid 20th century to "sprinkles" (known in some parts as "jimmies"; however, jimmies are typically the longer tubular sprinkles generally used as an ice cream topping), confections nearly as small but usually oblong rather than round and soft rather than brittle. Like nonpareils, their function is more decorative than gustatory as their actual taste is indistinct, and the products they are applied to are usually themselves very high in sugar.

=== Chocolate nonpareils ===
The term "nonpareils" can also refer to a specific confection: a round flat chocolate drop with the upper surface covered in nonpareils. This confection is also referred to as chocolate nonpareils. Ferrero makes a variety marketed in some countries as Sno-Caps.

In Australia, these confections are commonly known as chocolate freckles or simply freckles. Nonpareils are also sold in the United Kingdom as "Jazzies", "Jazzles," "Jazz drops," and "Snowies" (the latter being of the white chocolate variety).

== See also ==
- Confetti candy
- Dragée
