= Confetti cake =

Cake with rainbow sprinkles

Confetti Cake
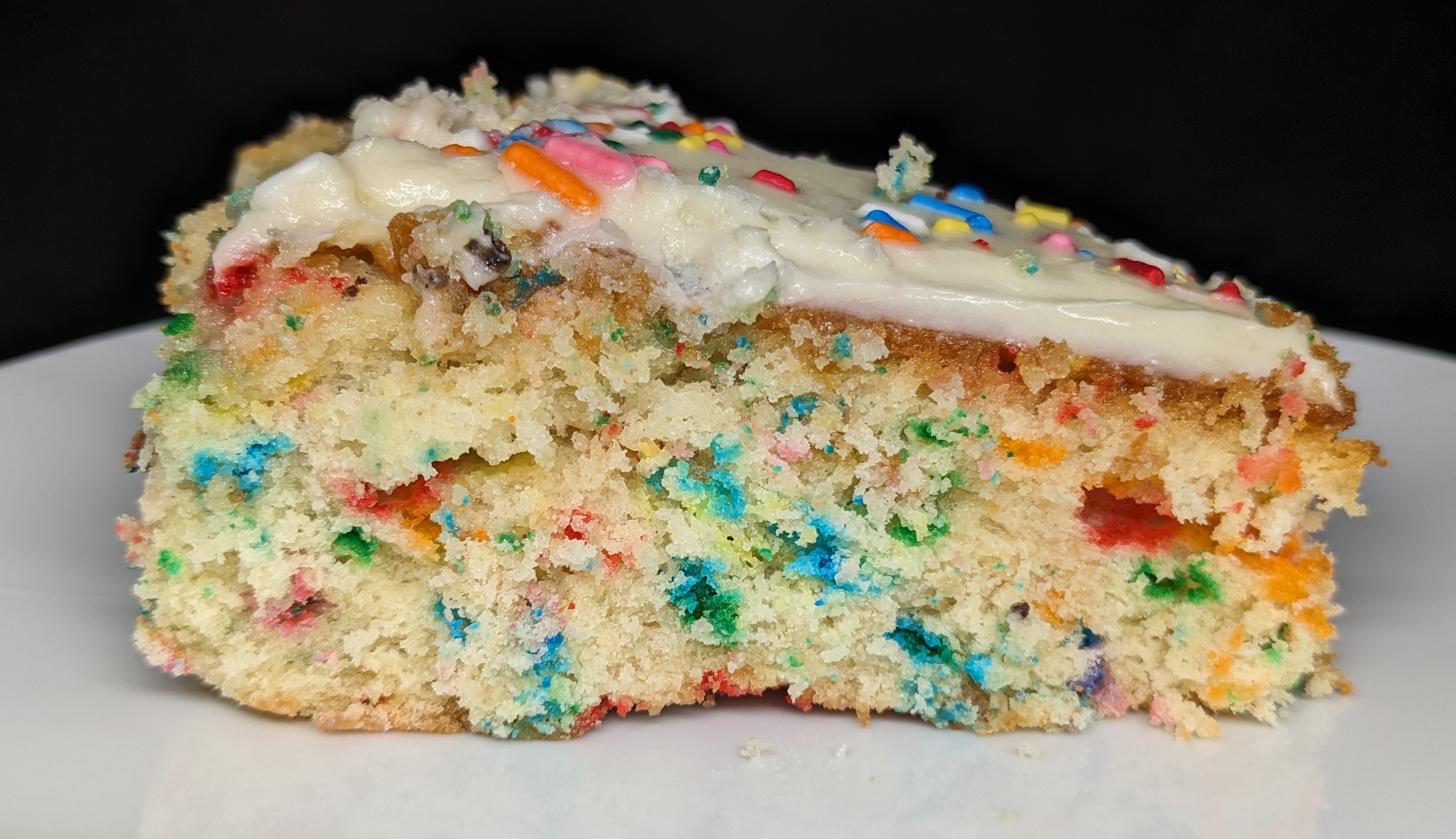
- A slice of home-made confetti cake
- Type: Cake
- Course: Dessert
- Place of origin: United States
- Main ingredients: Flour, sugar, rainbow sprinkles, eggs, vanilla extract

Confetti cake (Note: Also called birthday cake in American English, although this term usually refers to any cake eaten to celebrate someone's birthday.) is a type of cake that has rainbow-colored sprinkles baked into the batter. It is called confetti cake because when baked, the rainbow sprinkles melt into dots of bright color that resemble confetti. Typically the batter is either white, golden, or yellow to allow for a better visual effect; but chocolate, devil’s food, and strawberry cake variations also exist. The cake generally consists of flour, butter, baking powder, salt, sugar, vegetable oil, eggs, vanilla extract, milk, and rainbow colored sprinkles. The cake normally has a frosting made of butter, salt, powdered sugar, vanilla extract, and milk.

== Origin ==
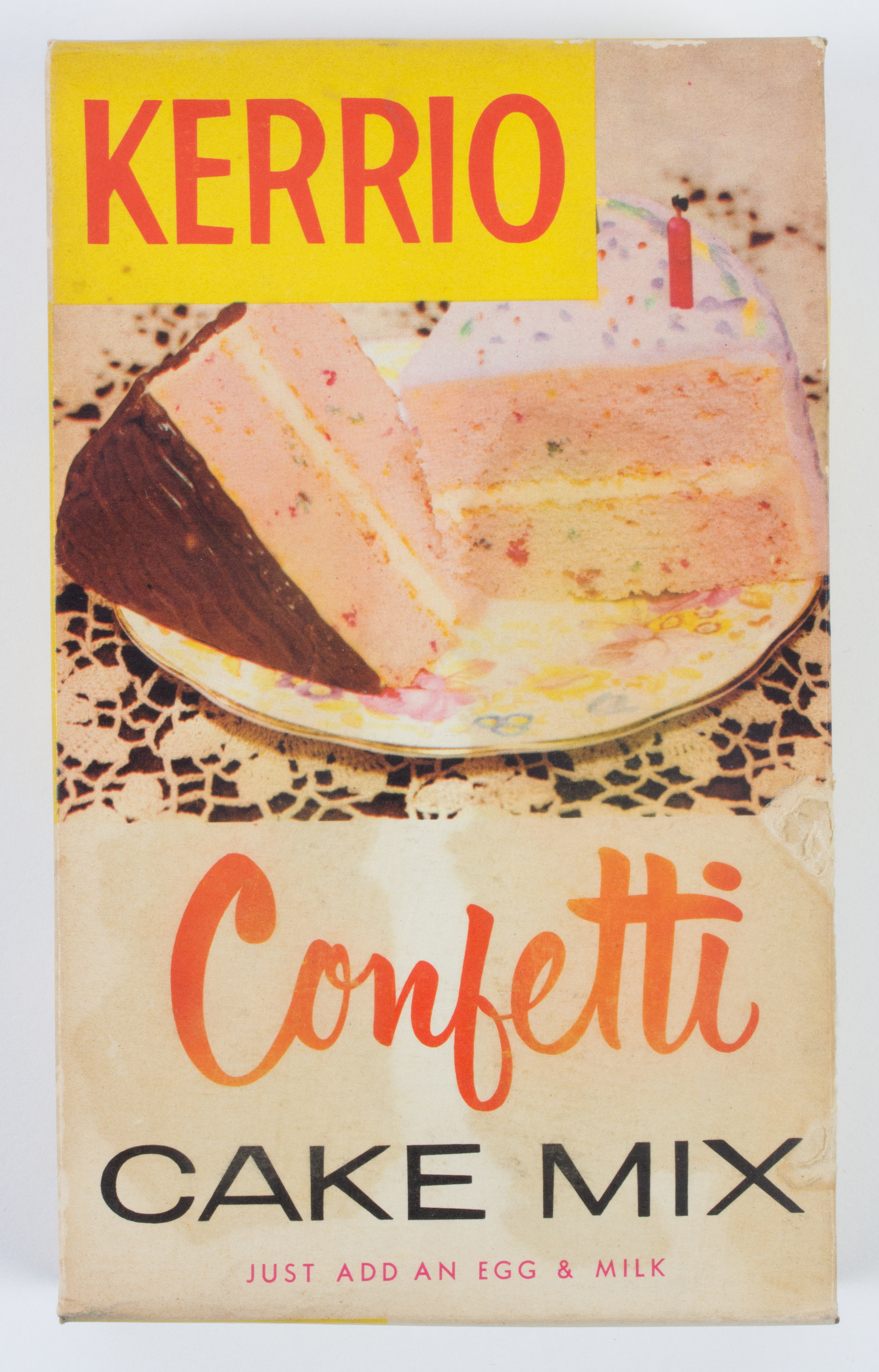
A box of pre-packaged confetti cake mix

Confetti cakes date at least back to the 1950s; a 1956 Betty Crocker advertisement in Life announced a new "confetti angel food" cake mix containing "colorful little morsels of sweetness". In 1989, the Pillsbury Company introduced "Funfetti" cake, a portmanteau of fun and confetti, which achieved great popularity. This was a white cake mix with multicolored sprinkles mixed into the batter. The cake's unique look was meant to target the demographic of children. The cake soon gained popularity and in 1990 Betty Crocker introduced a cookie that was to be eaten with icing that had rainbow chips mixed into it, called Dunk-a-roos. Although the cake is generally served with a plain frosting, Pillsbury also offers "Funfetti" frosting, with rainbow sprinkles added. Pillsbury owns the trademark to "Funfetti" so the cake is generally called confetti cake, or can also be referred to as a sprinkle cake.

== Modern ==
Confetti cake has inspired many interpretations such as confetti cookies, cereal bars, and even croissants. The idea of making something into a "confetti" treat is produced by adding rainbow colored sprinkles into the creation. Confetti cakes are also called funfetti cakes.

== See also ==
- Bara Brith, a Welsh cake with dried fruit and candied peel added to the batter
