= William Goodhugh =

English bookseller and writer

William Goodhugh (1799?–1842) was an English bookseller and writer.

== Life ==
Born about 1799, Goodhugh was for some time a bookseller at 155 Oxford Street, London. To help with bibliography, he studied languages. He became prominent by learned criticisms of John Bellamy's new translation of the Bible, in the Quarterly Review for April 1818 and July 1820. In 1840 he issued proposals for a society to be called the "Dugdale Society" for genealogical research on British families, but the project came to nothing.

Goodhugh died at Chelsea, London on 23 May 1842, aged 43, leaving a son and a daughter.

== Works ==
For a few years before his death, Goodhugh had been working on a biblical encyclopedia, which he had compiled to the letter R. The Bible Cyclopaedia appeared in two volumes, the second in 1843 carrying an Advertisement with a letter from William Cooke Taylor on the completion of the work, and a small amount of information on contributors. Goodhugh also published:

- The Gate to the French, Italian, and Spanish Unlocked (anon.), London, 1827.
- The Gate to the Hebrew, Arabic, and Syriac Unlocked by a new and easy method of acquiring the accidence (anon.), London, 1827.
- The English Gentleman's Library Manual, or a Guide to the Formation of a Library of Select Literature, London, 1827.
- Motives to the Study of Biblical Literature in a course of introductory lectures, London, 1838; another edition, without Goodhugh's name, was issued in 1839.
- The Bible Cyclopaedia: or, Illustrations of the Civil and Natural History of the Sacred Writings ... 1841.

== Notes ==
Attribution

This article incorporates text from a publication now in the public domain: Stephen, Leslie; Lee, Sidney, eds. (1890). "Goodhugh, William". Dictionary of National Biography. Vol. 22. London: Smith, Elder & Co.
