= Hagelslag =

Dutch chocolate granules

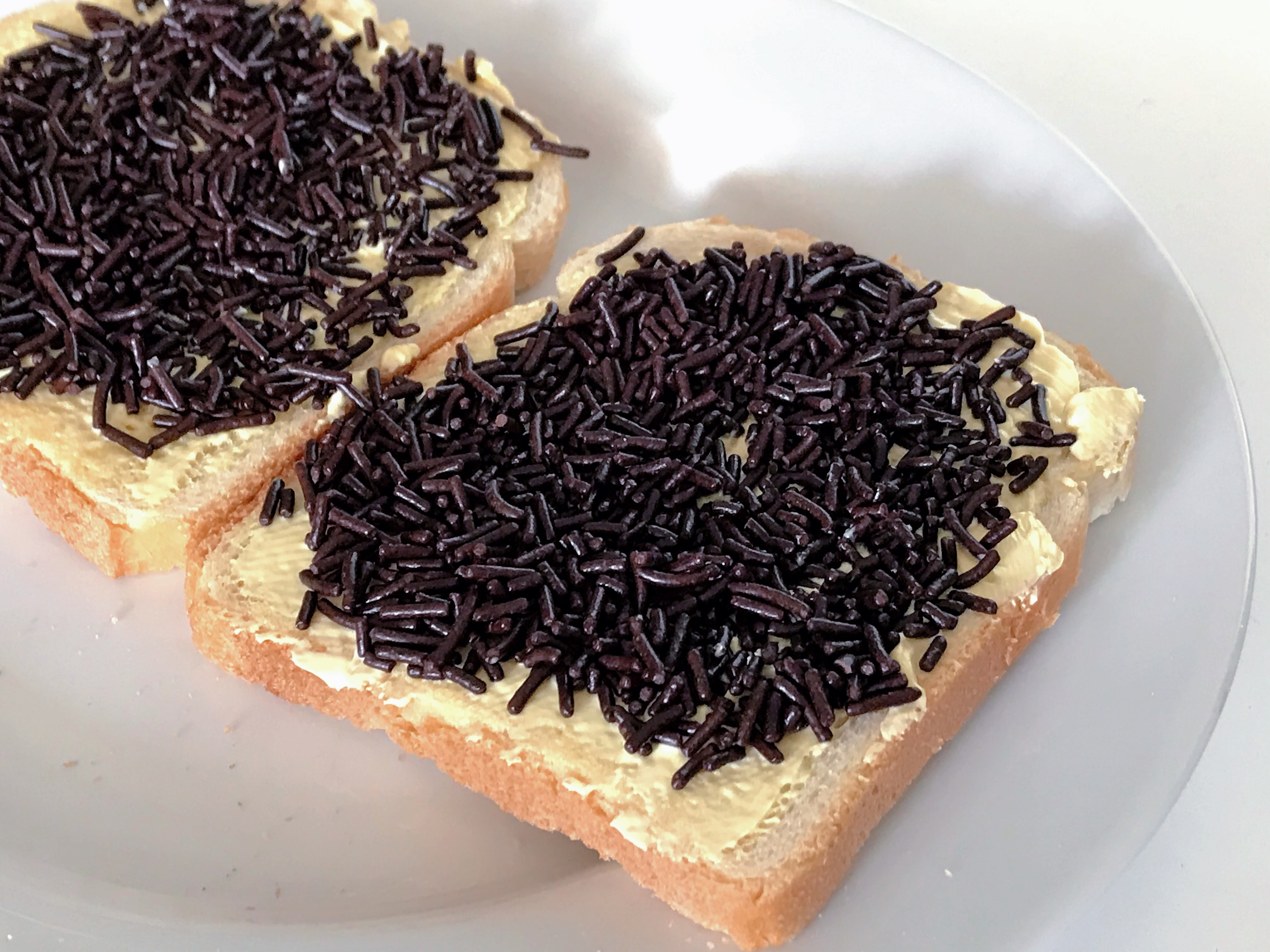
- Dark chocolate hagelslag sprinkles on buttered white bread
- Type: Sprinkles
- Place of origin: The Netherlands
- Created by: B.E. Dieperink
- Main ingredients: Chocolate

Hagelslag (Dutch pronunciation: [ˈɦaːɣəlˌslɑx], lit. 'hailstorm'; Indonesian: meses, from muisjes) are small, oblong, sweet-tasting chocolate sprinkles or granules, a few millimetres long, which are sprinkled on slices of buttered bread or rusks.

Hagelslag is traditionally eaten by the Dutch for breakfast or lunch. Hagelslag can be difficult to find in other countries, with the exception of Suriname, Belgium, the former Netherlands Antilles and Indonesia (all of which, besides Belgium, were former Dutch colonies), where one can buy Hagelslag in stores. In those regions, customers often use Hagelslag to decorate desserts and cakes. Hagelslag is also available in the ethnically Dutch communities of New Zealand, like Foxton in the Manawatū, where it is abundant.

In Belgium, they are commonly called muizenstrontjes (mouse droppings).

Another variant is vlokken ("flakes"), chocolate flakes to sprinkle on buttered bread. There is a variety of flavors of Hagelslag, such as pure hagelslag (dark chocolate), witte hagelslag (white chocolate), and melkchocoladehagelslag (milk chocolate), and even vruchtenhagel (fruit flavoured).

An estimated 750,000 hagelslag sandwiches are eaten each day in the Netherlands for breakfast, a snack or lunch. A hagelslag sandwich (broodje hagelslag) is hagelslag sprinkled onto buttered bread. More than 14 million kilograms of hagelslag are consumed each year in the Netherlands.

== History ==
According to historical records from the Amsterdam City Archives, Hagelslag was originally invented by B.E. Dieperink, the director of the liquorice sweet company Venco, in 1919. However, Venco's hagelslag did not contain chocolate until 1951. Venco obtained a patent for the name, which meant that other companies, such as De Ruijter and Venz, were not permitted to use the term to describe their own products. Consequently, De Ruijter opted to name their sprinkles based on their flavors, using the term hagel after the flavor (such as in vruchtenhagel). Venz and other companies named their chocolate sprinkles chocoladehagel. De Ruijter introduced competition to Venco with their assortment of flavors, including lemon, raspberry, orange and aniseed. Venz, the Netherlands' largest producer of hagelslag products, has been making chocolate hagelslag since 1936.

The world's largest hagelslag factory is in Tilburg.

== See also ==
- Fairy bread, similar Australian food with colored sprinkles
