= Muisjes =

Traditional Dutch bread topping

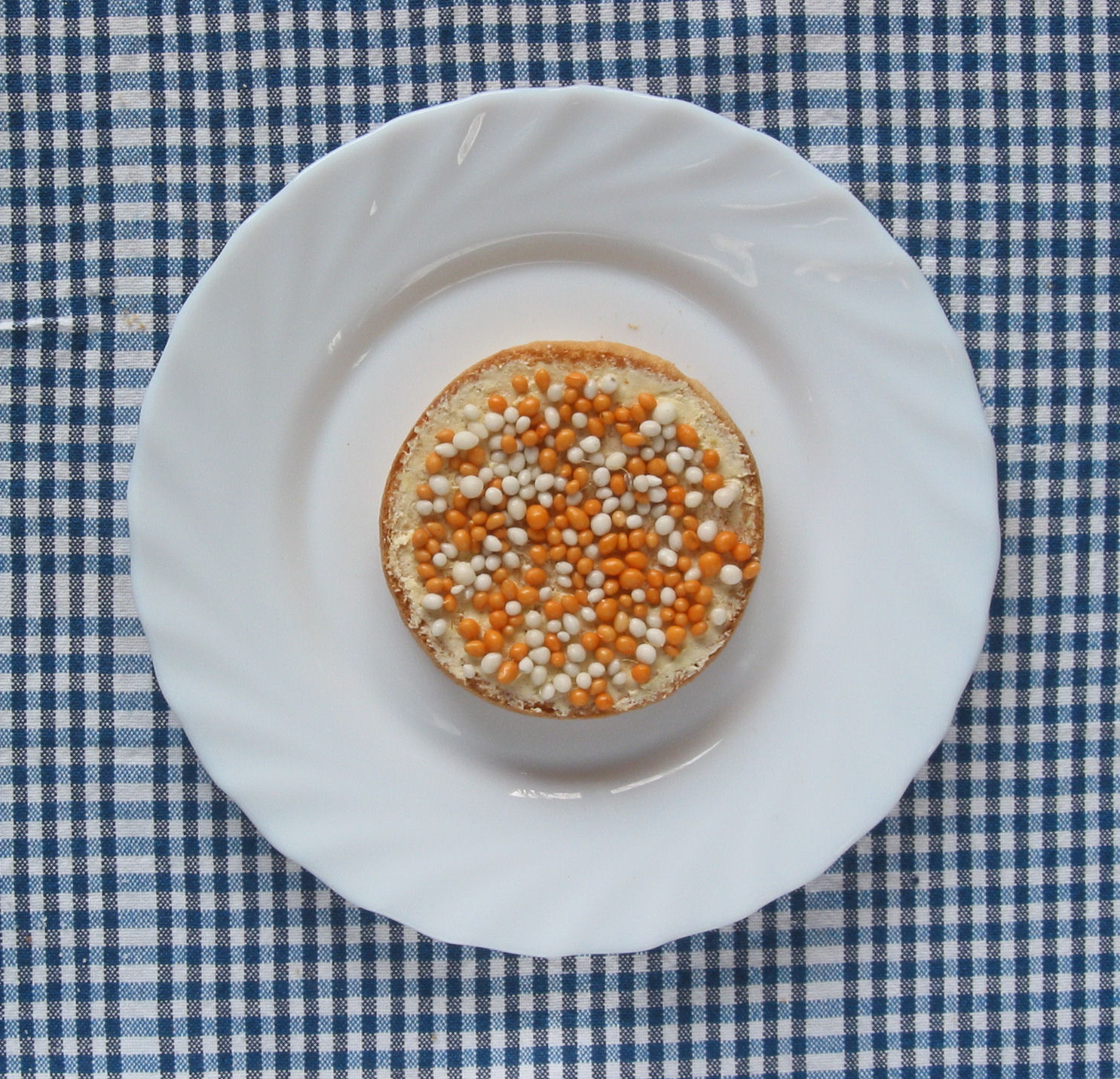
- Dutch rusk with orange muisjes
- Place of origin: Netherlands
- Main ingredients: Aniseed, sugar

Muisjes (Dutch: [ˈmœyɕəs]; lit. 'little mice') are Dutch aniseed comfits, used as a traditional bread topping, often to celebrate the birth of a baby. They are traditionally eaten on beschuit, or rusk, though it is also customary to eat them on bread. Muisjes is a registered trademark of Koninklijke De Ruijter BV. Muisjes are made of aniseeds with a sugared and colored outer layer. Dutch food processing company De Ruijter, a brand acquired by Heinz in 2001, holds a monopoly on the production of Muisjes.

== Etymology ==
It's uncertain why the name "little mice" was chosen. It may have been that the stem of the seed reminded people of a mouse's tail, or it may have been that the mouse's fast reproductive cycle was further used as symbolism for healthy childbirth. In Belgium they are commonly called muizenstrontjes (mouse droppings).

== Beschuit met muisjes ==
In the Netherlands, it is customary to celebrate the birth of a baby by eating muisjes on top of rusk—beschuit met muisjes — with family and colleagues. In the 17th century, aniseed was thought to aid lactation and help the womb contract.

The exact origin of giving away muisjes is unknown, but likely stems from traditions dating back to the Middle Ages. Because childbirth used to be very dangerous for women, births without complications were celebrated extensively. A treat—usually something sweet—was given to visitors as a supposed "gift" from the newborn child. Muisjes started being produced in the Netherlands in the 18th century, and replaced sugar as the favourite topping used on beschuit to symbolise successful childbirth. However, beschuit was quite expensive at the time and mostly reserved for festivities organised by the wealthy, so most people instead ate sugary white bread until beschuit became cheaper. When pink muisjes were introduced in 1860, they became the standard with births of female babies while the original white muisjes remained in use with male ones. With the introduction of blue muisjes in 1994, blue has become the standard with boys instead.

De Ruijter is currently the largest brand in production of muisjes and has been producing them since 1860. King Willem III made the brand a supplier of the royal court in 1883. The company managed to repopularize the dish when in 1938 the Dutch royal family was given a large can of orange muisjes (orange is the color of the Dutch royal family, the House of Orange-Nassau) in celebration of the birth of princess Beatrix. Orange muisjes were again sold for only one week in December 2003, in honour of the birth of future crown princess Catharina-Amalia.

== Gestampte muisjes ==
Gestampte muisjes ("crushed muisjes") are muisjes crushed to powder, which are sprinkled onto a slice of bread or a Dutch rusk over butter, a customary breakfast food for Dutch children. According to De Ruijter, some elderly women with bad teeth at the end of the 19th century were the origin of gestampte muisjes. They had difficulty eating the hard aniseed balls and decided to grind them in a mortar.

== See also ==
- Beschuit met muisjes, a 1910 play by Herman Heijermans
- Fairy bread
- Hagelslag, a Dutch bread topping made of chocolate or flavored sugar
- Suikerboon, or "sugar bean", the equivalent food on the occasion of a birth in Flanders
- Mukhwas
