= Chocolate-covered potato chips =

American snack food

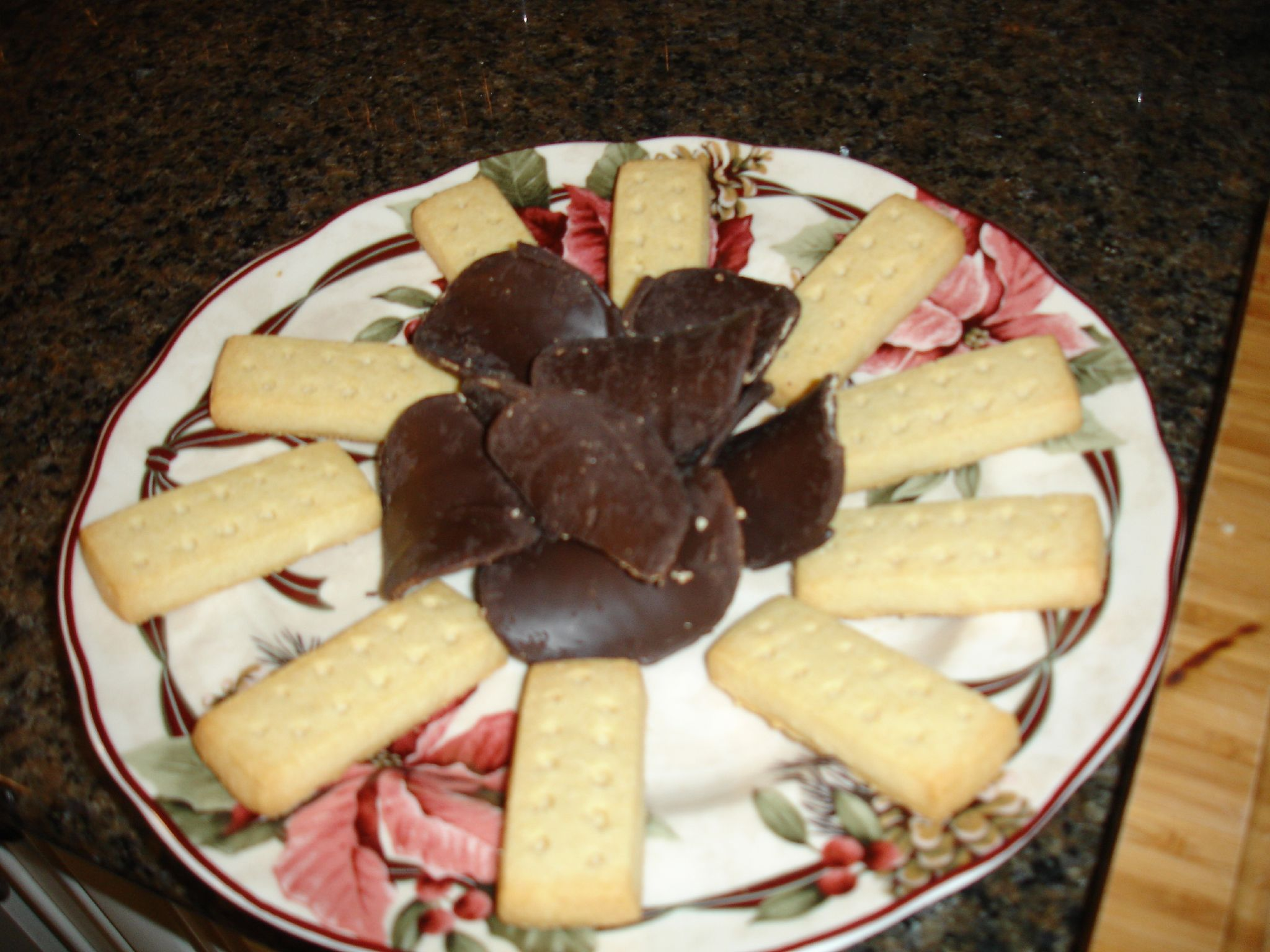
- Chocolate-covered potato chips surrounded by shortbread cookies
- Course: Appetizer, dessert, party snack
- Place of origin: United States
- Region or state: North Dakota
- Main ingredients: Potato chips, chocolate

Chocolate-covered potato chips are a snack food consisting of potato chips that have been coated with chocolate. They are used for snacking like potato chips, and also served at parties or get togethers as appetizers and dessert items, especially in North Dakota.

== History ==
The "chipper" has existed for many years, although the facts about its creation and history are in dispute. Widman's Candy, founded in 1885, has a long history with the product. For many years, these treats, called "chippers", have been made in the Grand Forks, North Dakota area by Widman's, other commercial confectioneries, and at homes.

They were introduced into the market in Chicago in 1985 by a company called Executive Sweets.

== Preparation ==
The potato chips used are usually the regular or plain tasting ridged shaped potato chips. Ridged chips are used because they tend to be more sturdy and can hold the heavy chocolate. It also allows the chocolate flavor to be enhanced as the chocolate is allowed to build between the ridges of the chip. The kind of chocolate used is usually milk chocolate that is easily tempered for coating other foods. The tempering of chocolate is to lend an attractive, glossy appearance to the chocolate after it has been melted to the consistency for dipping. Chocolate covered potato chips may also be found in the gourmet section of grocery stores or at a specialty foods store.

== See also ==
- Chocolate-coated marshmallow treats
- Chocolate-coated peanut
- Chocolate-coated raisin
- Chocolate-covered bacon
- Chocolate-covered coffee bean
- List of chocolate-covered foods
