= Chocolate-covered fruit =

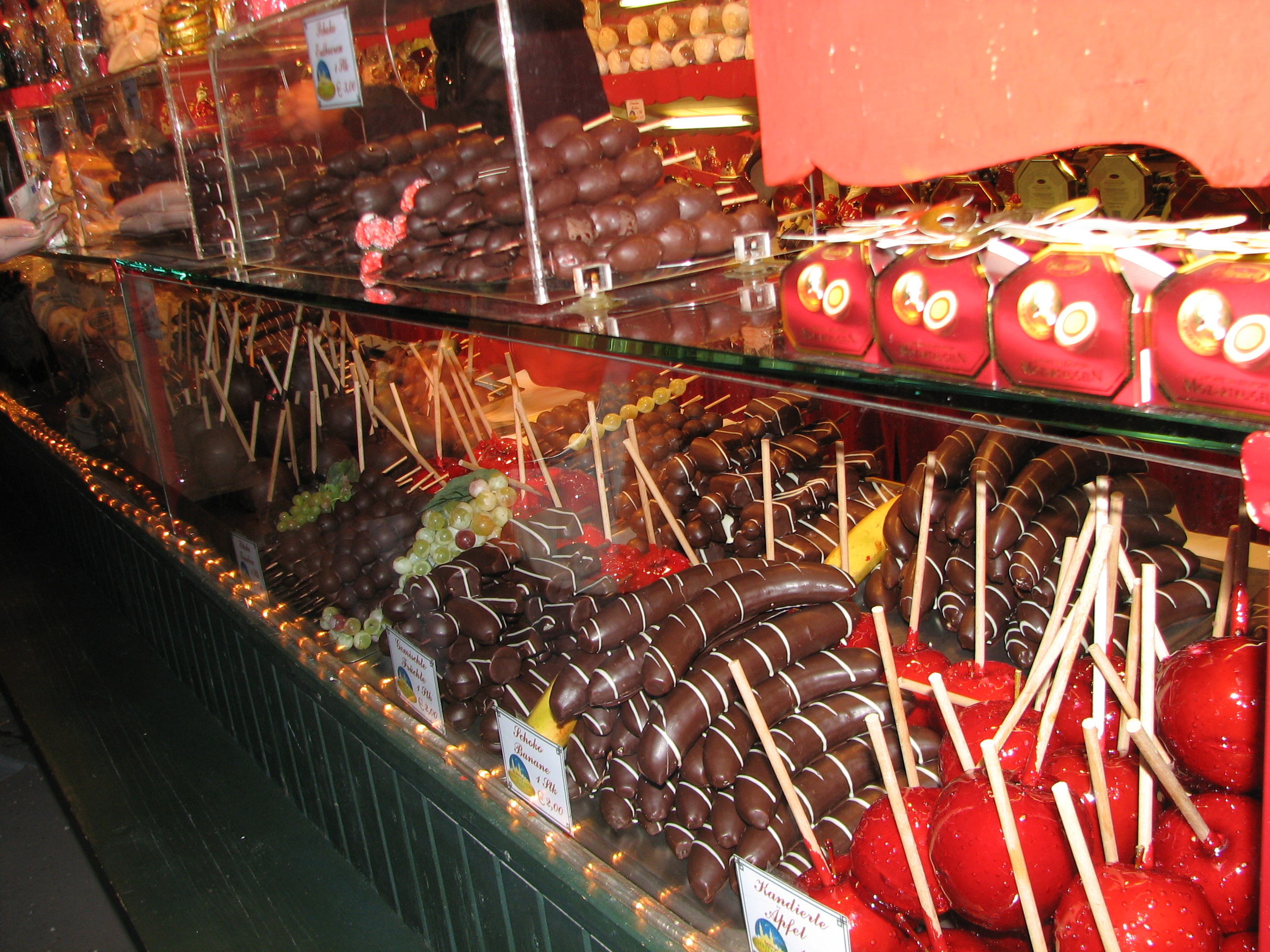
A booth selling caramel apples and chocolate-covered fruit at the Christkindlmarkt in Salzburg, Austria

Chocolate-covered fruits can be either fresh or dried. Fruits used include strawberries, blueberries, cherries, pomegranates, kiwi fruit, pineapple, bananas, oranges, dried apricots, raisins, citrus peels and other dried or candied fruits. Fruit can be dipped in dark chocolate, milk chocolate or white chocolate, which are also used for decoration. Nuts, coconut, chocolate chips, sprinkles, and other toppings are sometimes added.

== Preparation ==
External videos
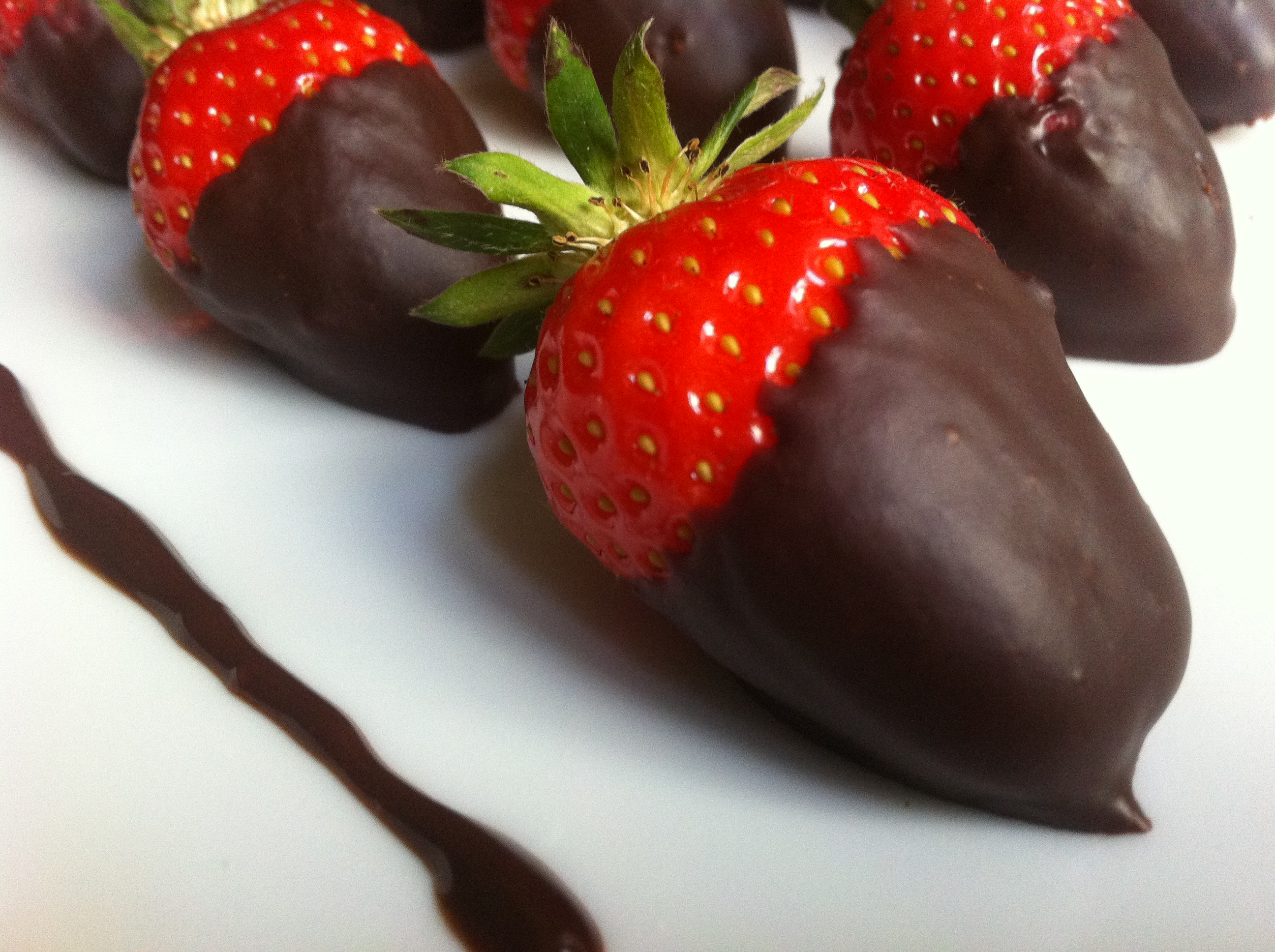
- "Easy Chocolate Covered Strawberries"

Fruits should be dipped in a chocolate containing more than 50% cocoa butter. A chocolate bar made for eating is more likely to have this level of cocoa butter than chocolate chips, which are meant to hold their shape when heated. Tempering, a process of heating and cooling the chocolate, is required to achieve a smooth dipping consistency and a crisply cracking shell. The tempering process first melts the fat crystals in cocoa butter, and then allows them to solidify again with a stable crystal formation that gives the coating its smooth finish. Some confectioners may use a non-chocolate confectioner's coating which does require tempering.

Fresh fruit should be carefully washed and dried ahead of time to ensure that the chocolate sticks. It is best to use fruit at room temperature: if it is too cold, surface moisture may prevent chocolate from sticking to the fruit. Fresh fruits such as strawberries, which are 90% water, cannot be covered in chocolate more than a day or two in advance of eating, because their high water content means they will not keep well.

== History ==
In 1544, Dominican friar Bartolomé de las Casas and a delegation of Qʼeqchiʼ presented cocoa beans and chocolate to Philip II, later King of Spain. Drinking chocolate did not become popular in Spain until the late 1500s. By the 1700s, it had spread to France and England as a drink of the wealthy. Pre-industrial producers of wafers for use in making drinking chocolate included Fry & Sons of Bristol, founded in 1728, and the Steinhund or Steinhude factory in Germany, founded in 1765.

Production of powdered cocoa and chocolate in bars were industrialized in the 1800s. In 1828, Coenraad van Houten developed a process for separating out cocoa powder, revolutionizing chocolate production. Per capita intake of both chocolate and sugar rose dramatically as sweetened solid chocolate became a staple of confectionery and desserts. In 1847, J.S. Fry & Sons of Bristol, England sold the first sweetened chocolate bar for eating. In 1875 Daniel Peter developed the milk chocolate bar using concentrated milk invented by Henri Nestlé.

Fruit cordials can be made far in advance using fruits such as cherries, soaked in liqueur or sugar syrup, within a chocolate shell. Chocolate-covered cherries may have been made in France as early as the 1700s. Long-stalked tart griotte cherries, a speciality of the Franche-Comté region, were soaked with kirsch to preserve them. At some point they were covered in chocolate. In the United States, Cella's began making chocolate cherries in 1864, the Brock Candy Company (later Brach's) in the 1930’s and Queen Anne's in 1948.

Chocolate covered fruits are popular at European markets during the Christmas season. Chocolate-covered dried fruits are sometimes included in boxed chocolates. Chocolate covered dried fruits were a world-wide export of the California fruit industry as early as 1927. In 2024-2025, Vietnam, Uzbekistan, and Mexico were the biggest exporters of dried fruit while the United States and Russia were the top importers.

Strawberries dipped in chocolate are a popular gift for Valentine's Day in the United States. Credit for inventing the chocolate-covered strawberry has been given to Lorraine Lorusso in the 1960s, who dipped strawberries in chocolate, and first sold them for Mother's Day in a gourmet food store in Chicago.

Chocolate fondue with various fruits is eaten for dessert. Strawberries and other fruits are also served for dipping into chocolate fountains, often on wooden skewers.

December 16th has been referred to as "National Chocolate Covered Anything Day", promoting the use of chocolate to cover not only fruit, but all sort of other foods. Other chocolate-related "holidays" promoted by the United States National Confectioners Association range from National Chocolate Covered Cherry Day (January 3) to National Chocolate Covered Insects Day (October 14).

== Examples ==
- Chocolate-covered cherry
- Chocolate-covered prune
- Chocolate-covered raisin
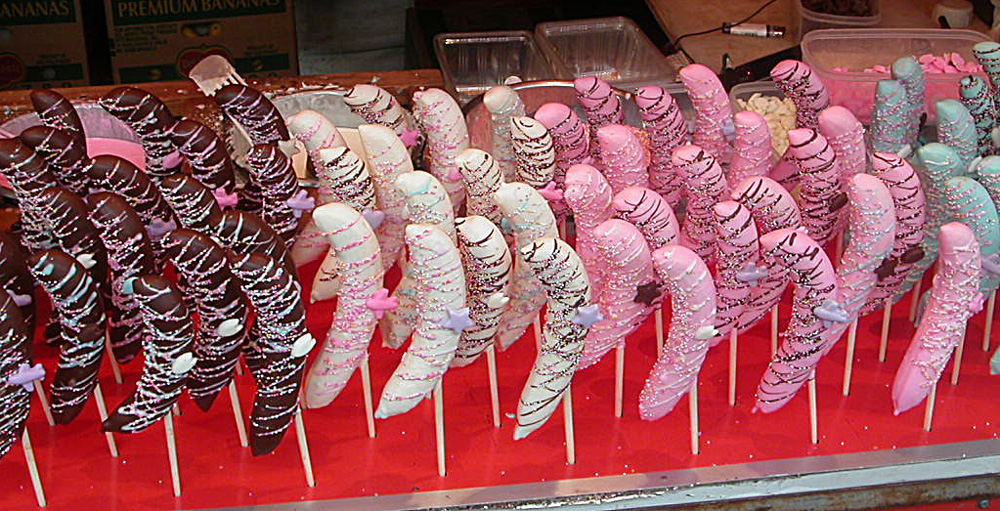
"Chocobananas" from Japan

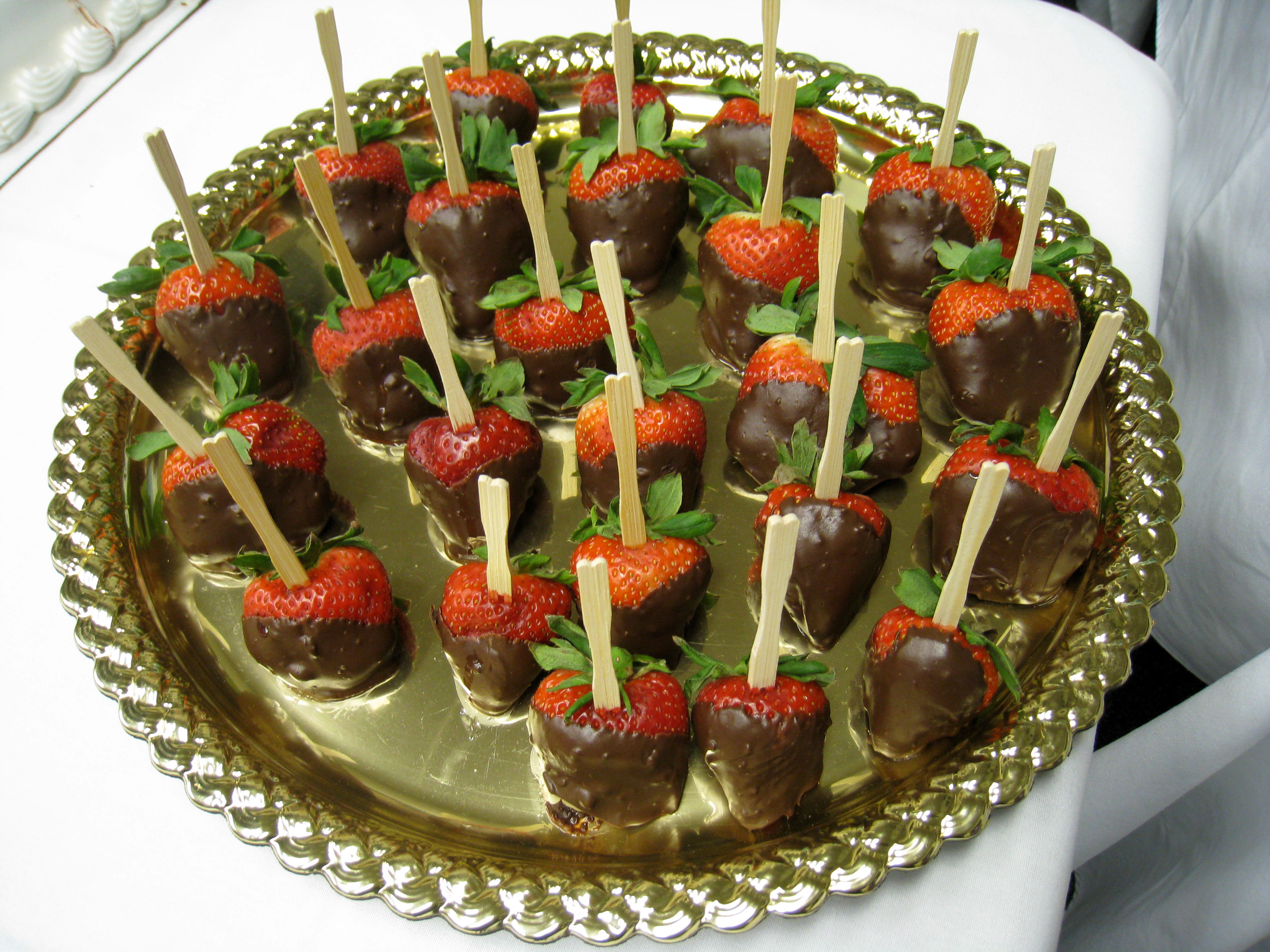
Chocolate-dipped strawberries

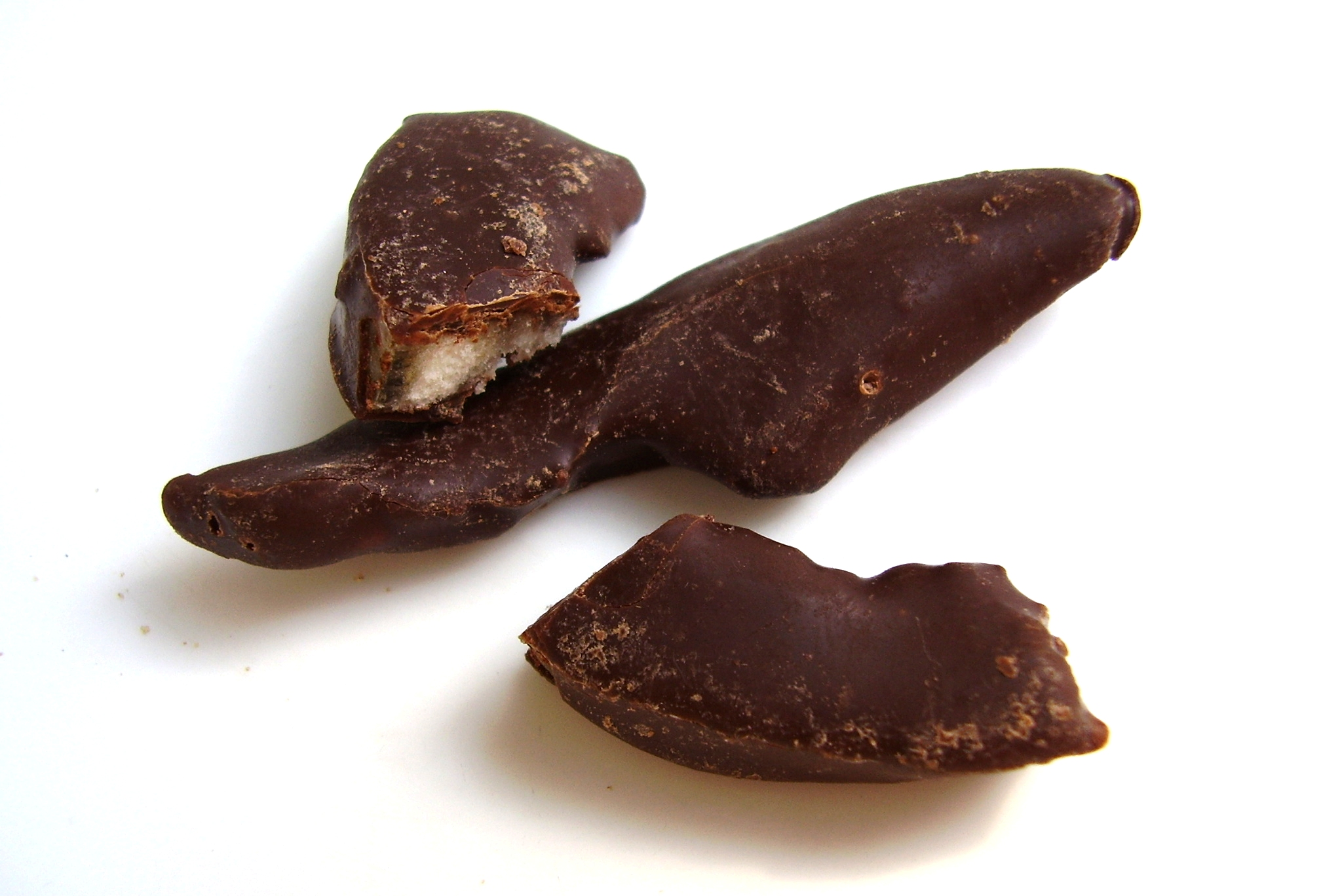
Chocolate coated citrus peel

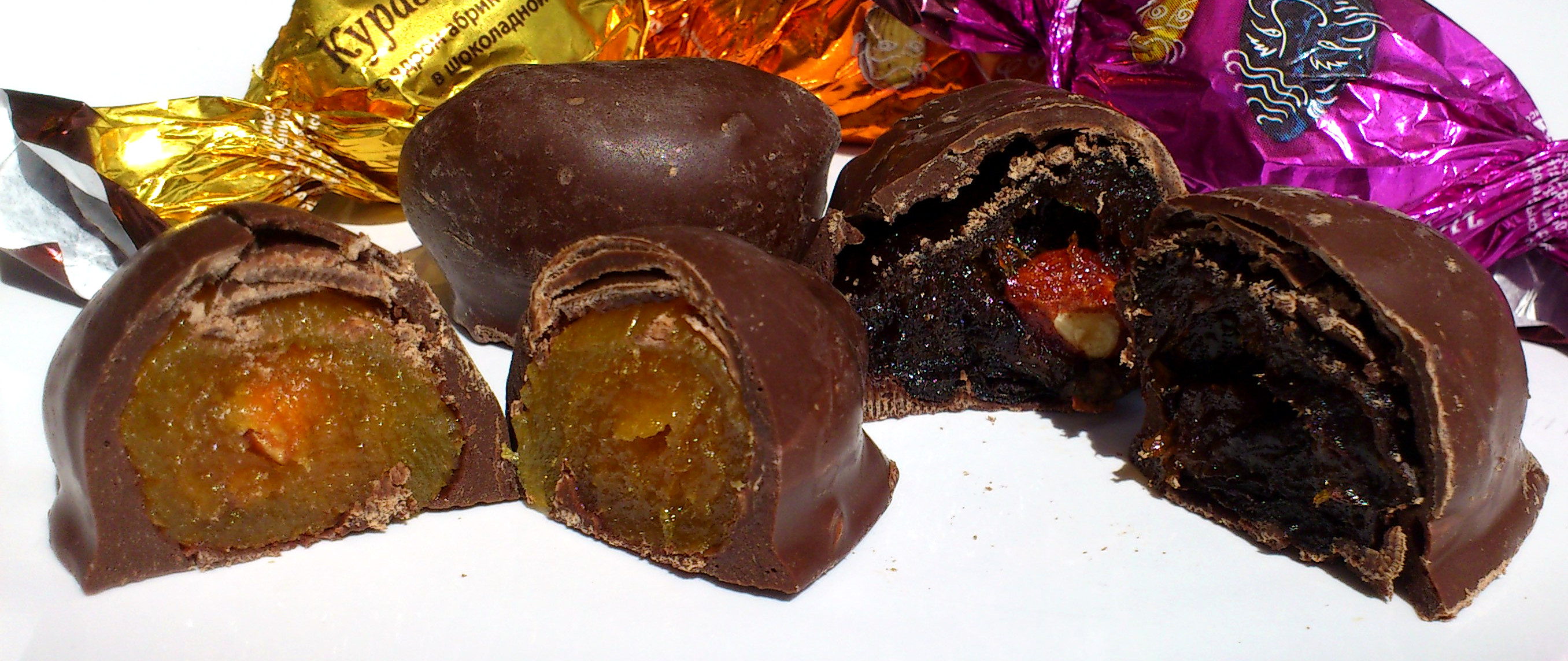
Chocolate coated dried apricots and prunes

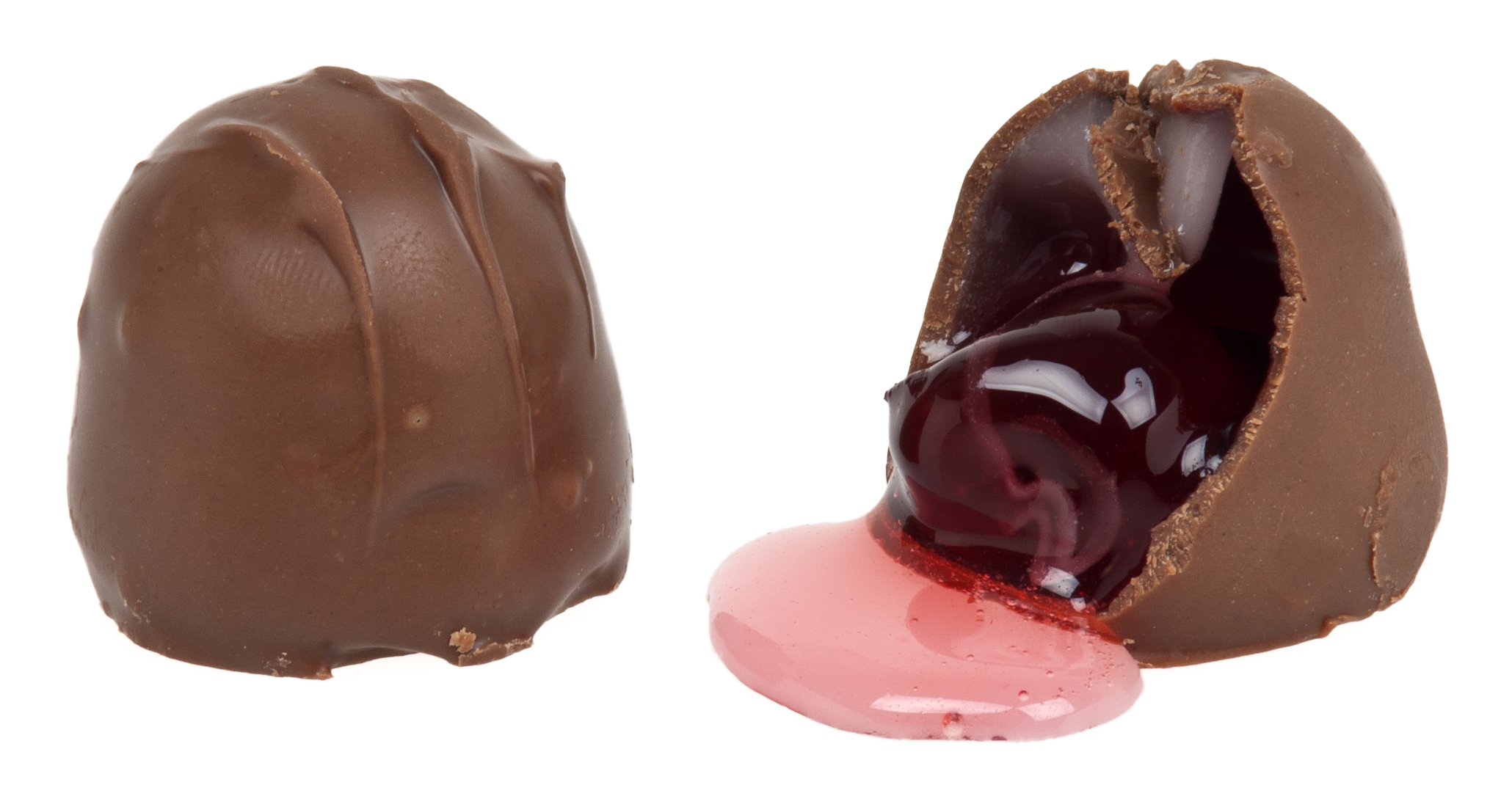
Cherry cordial

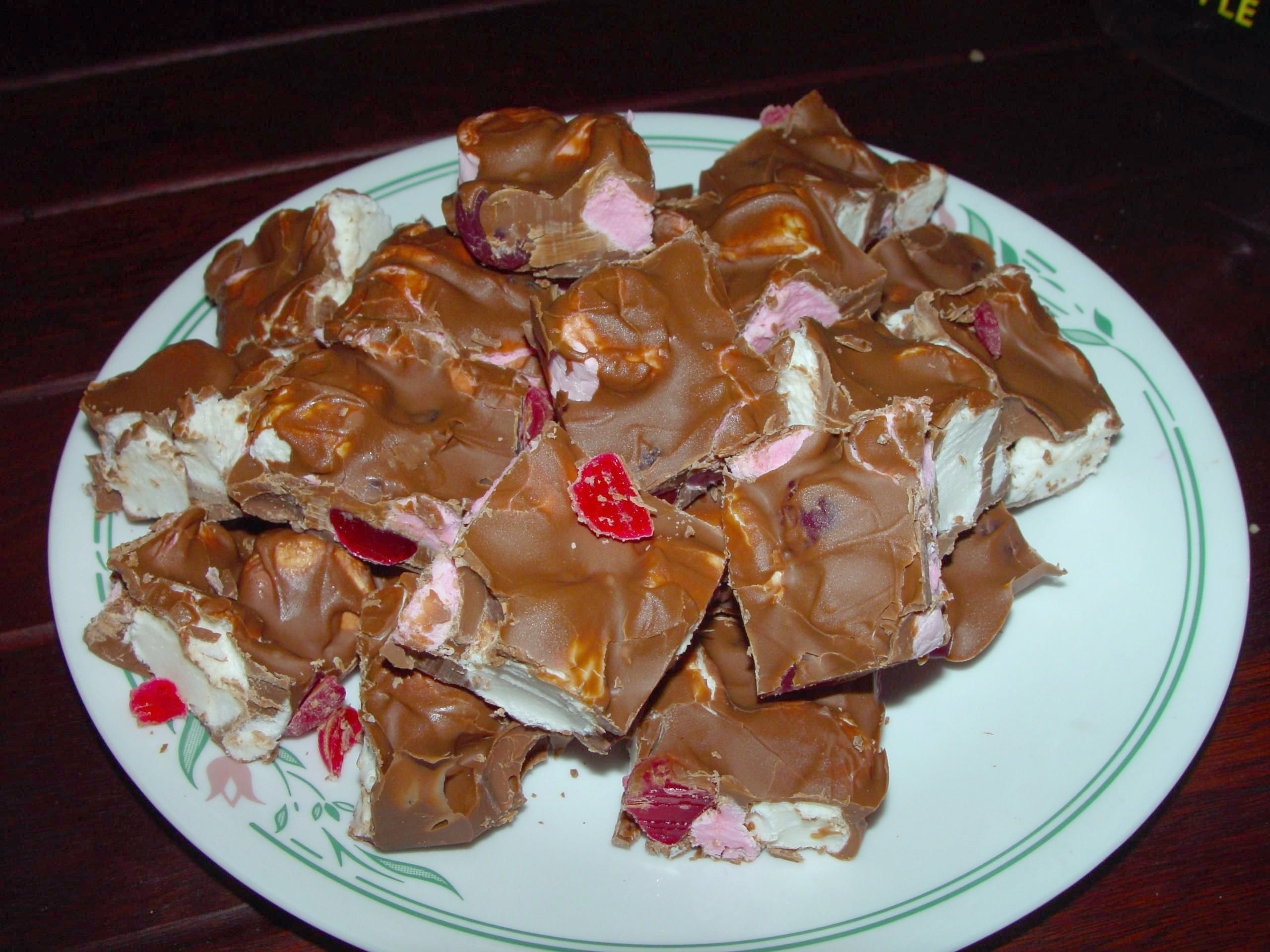
Cherries with pink and white nougat covered in chocolate

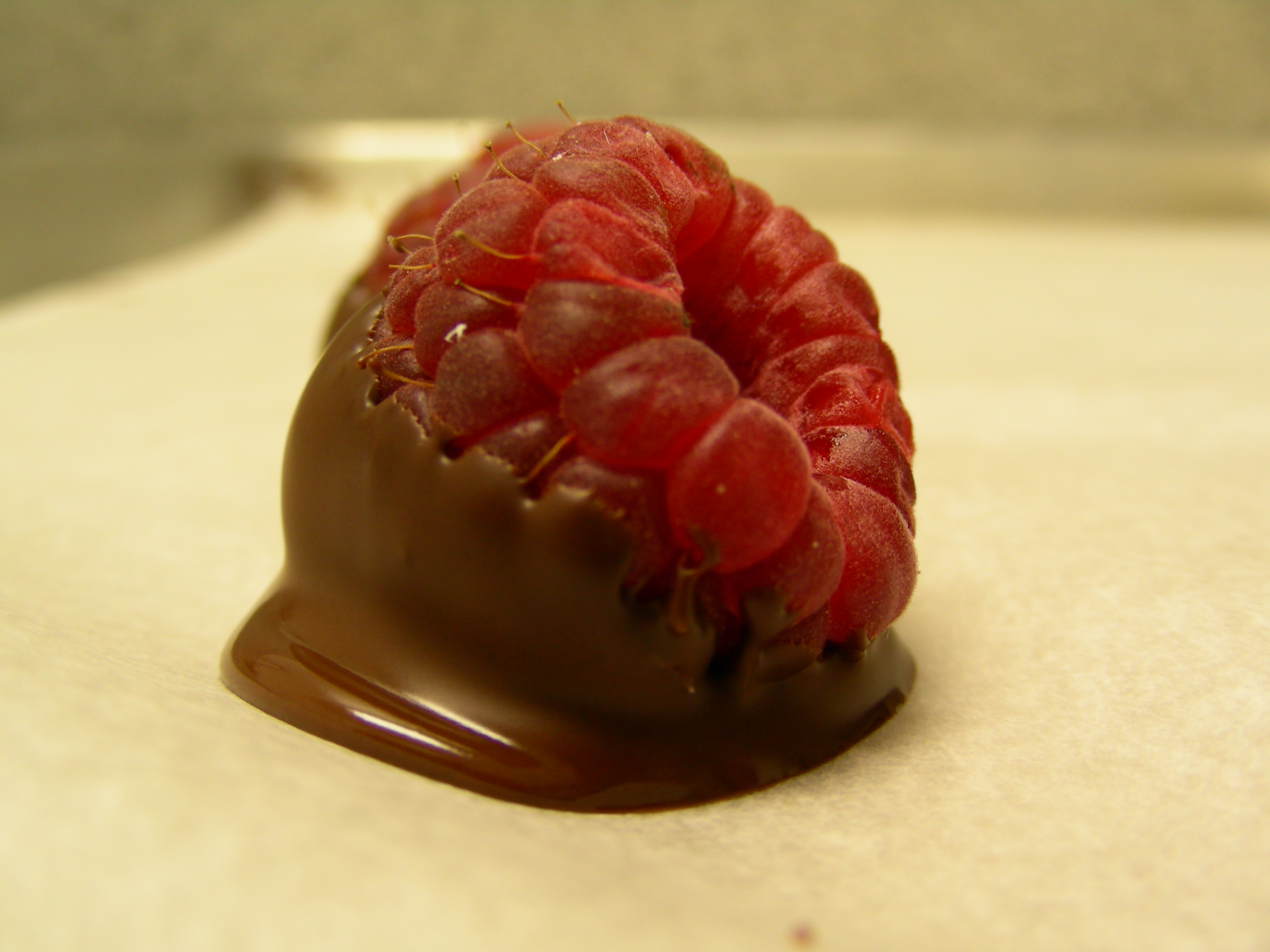
Chocolate-dipped raspberry

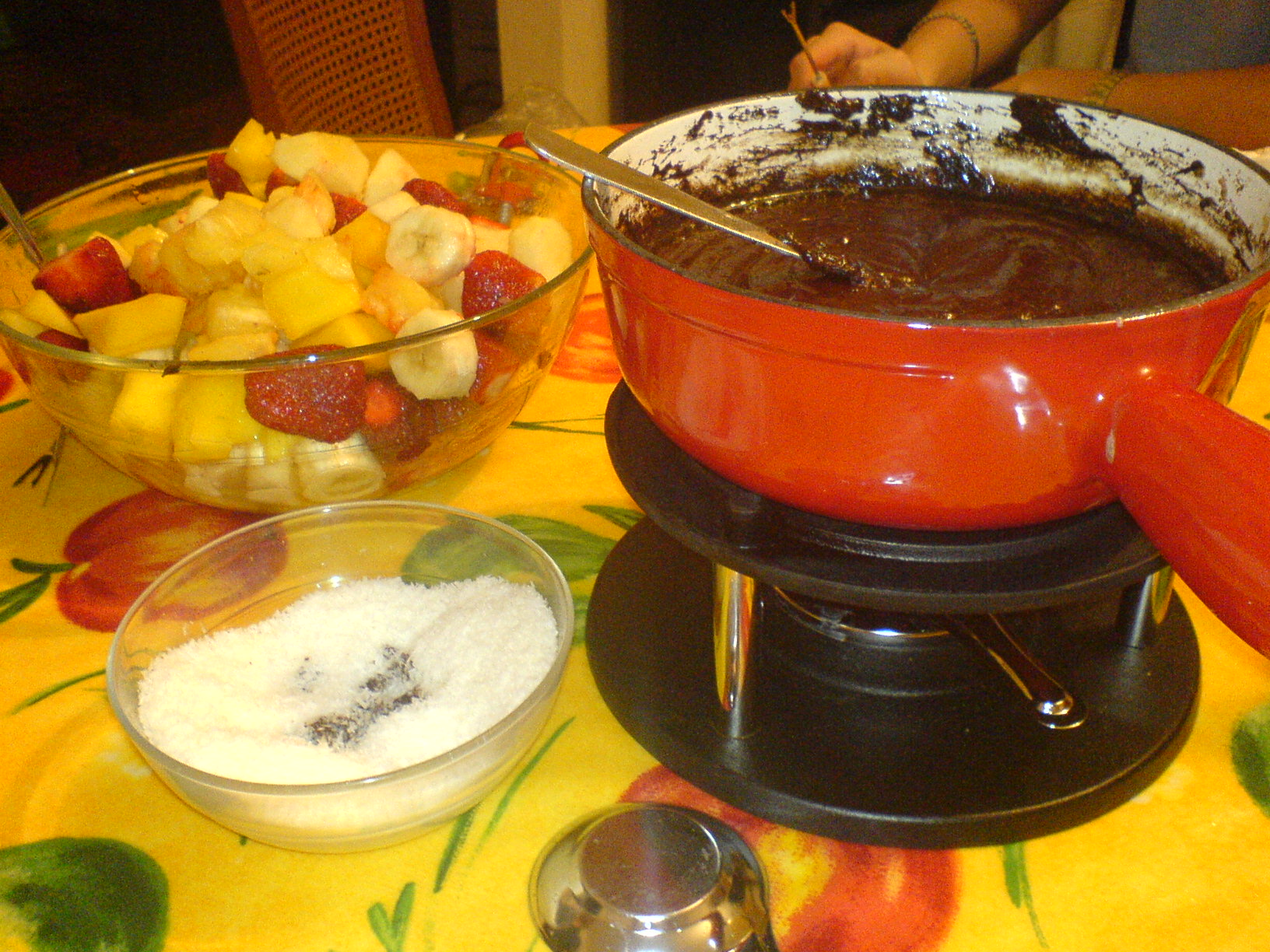
Chocolate fondue

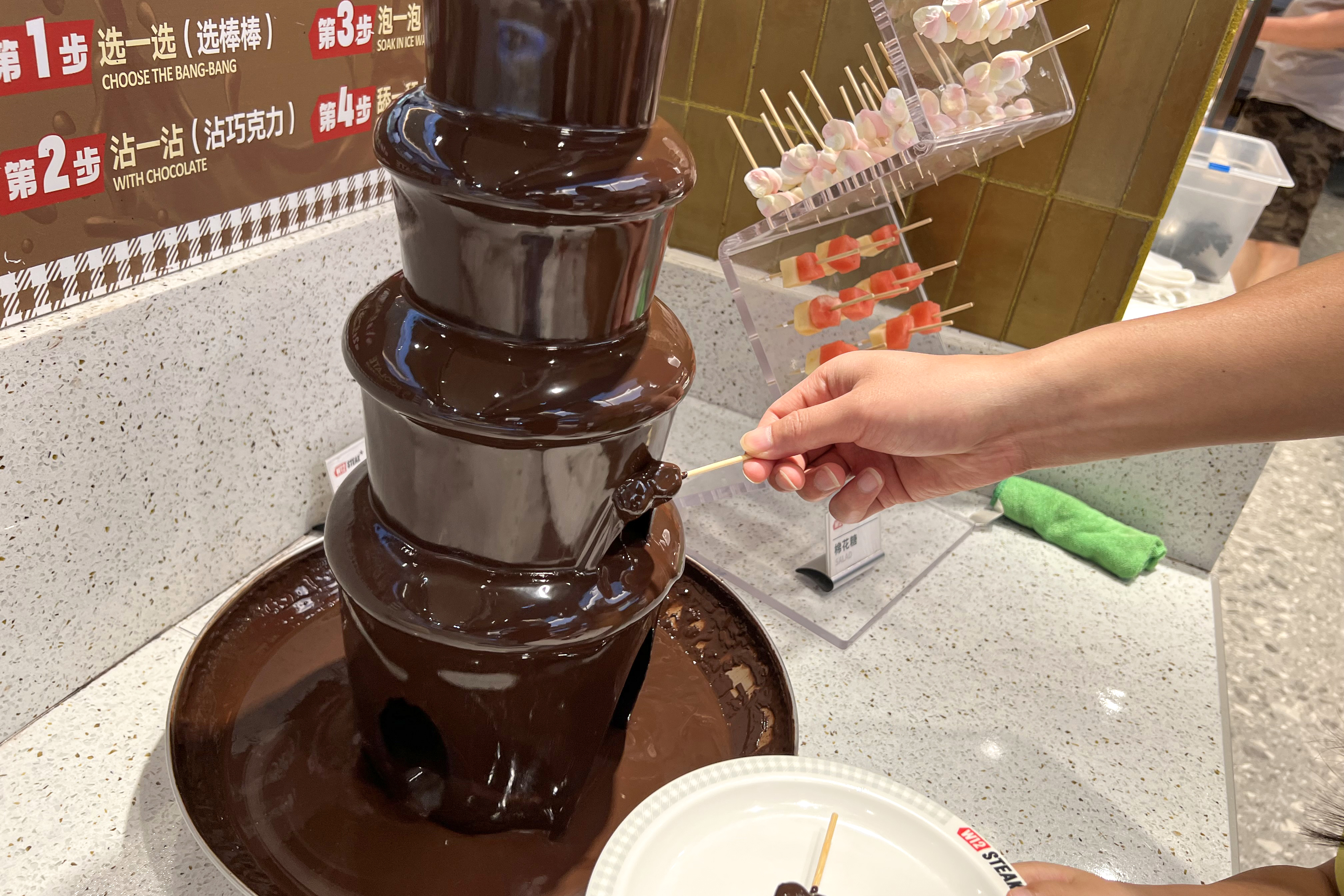
Chocolate fountain for dipping fruit

== Brands ==
Various brands make fruit covered chocolate candies including:

- Cella's – chocolate-covered cherries
- Marich Confectionery – chocolate-covered dried fruits
- Mon Chéri by Ferrero SpA – The Mon Chéri is a single-wrapped combination consisting of a "heart" of cherry (18%) floating in a liqueur (13%) and contained in a bittersweet chocolate housing (69%).

== See also ==
- List of chocolate-covered foods
