= Chocolate-covered cherry =

Confectionery

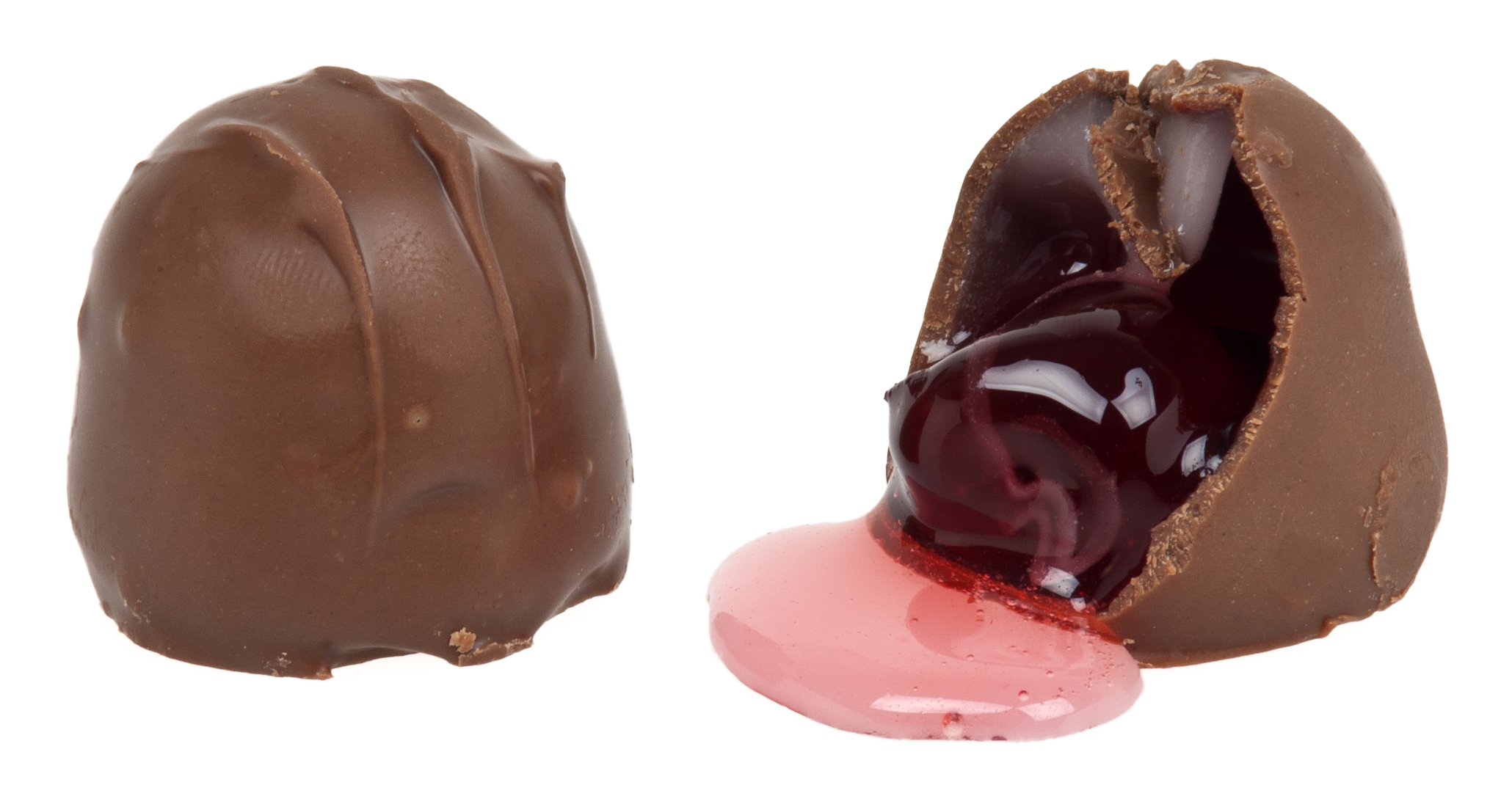
Cella's brand of cherry cordial confection

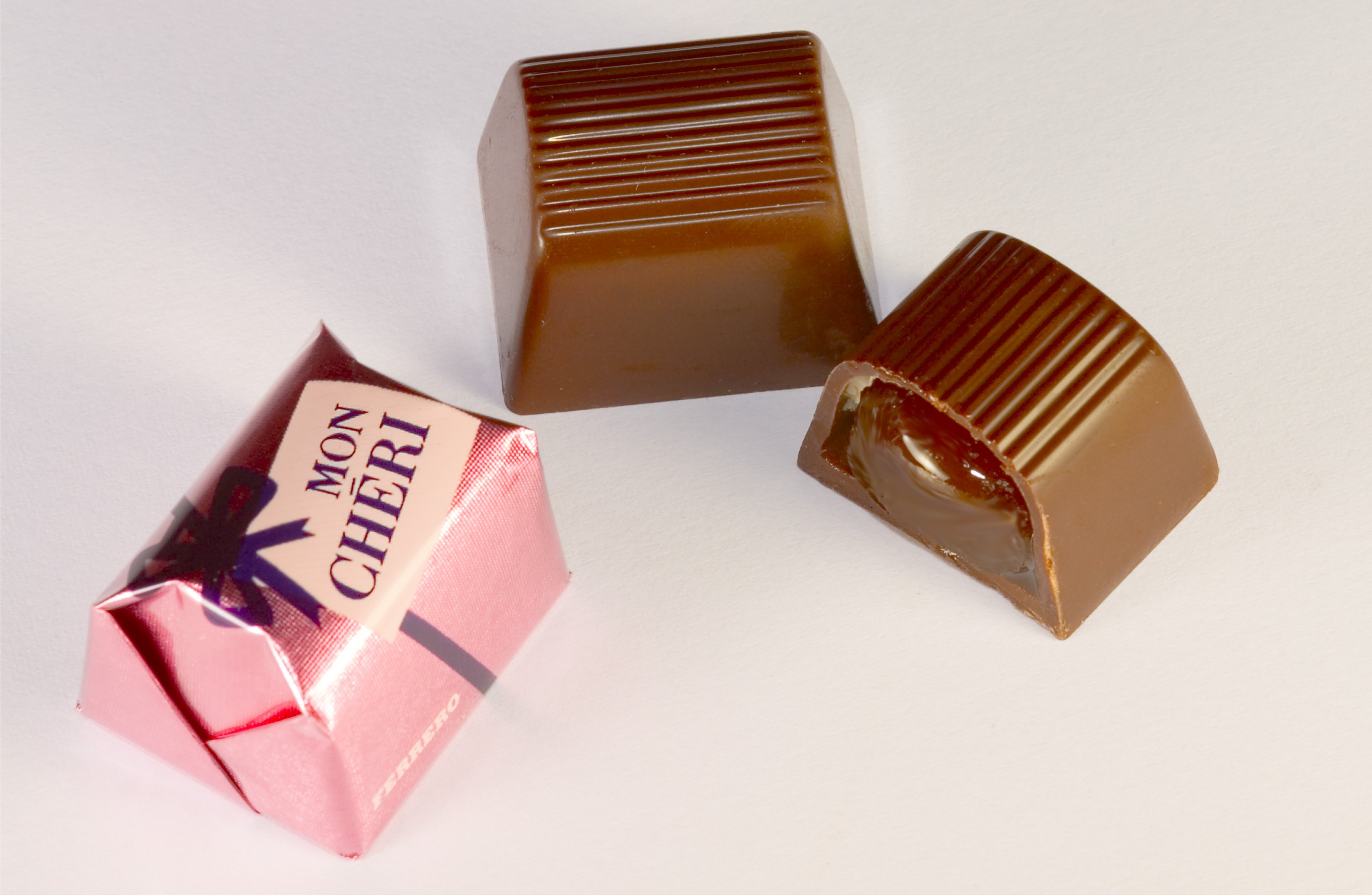
Ferrero Mon Cheri

Chocolate-covered cherries are a dessert confection. (Note: "The idea came from the enduring popularity of the chocolate-covered cherry confection — a combination of chocolate and cherries which appears to have not diminished in any way over the decades.") Variations include cherry cordials with liquid fillings often including cherry liqueur, as well as chocolate-covered candied cherries and chocolate-covered dried cherries.

Major U.S. brands of chocolate-covered cherries include Chukar Cherries, Cella's, Brach's, Queen Anne's (World's Finest Chocolate), and Marich Confectionery.

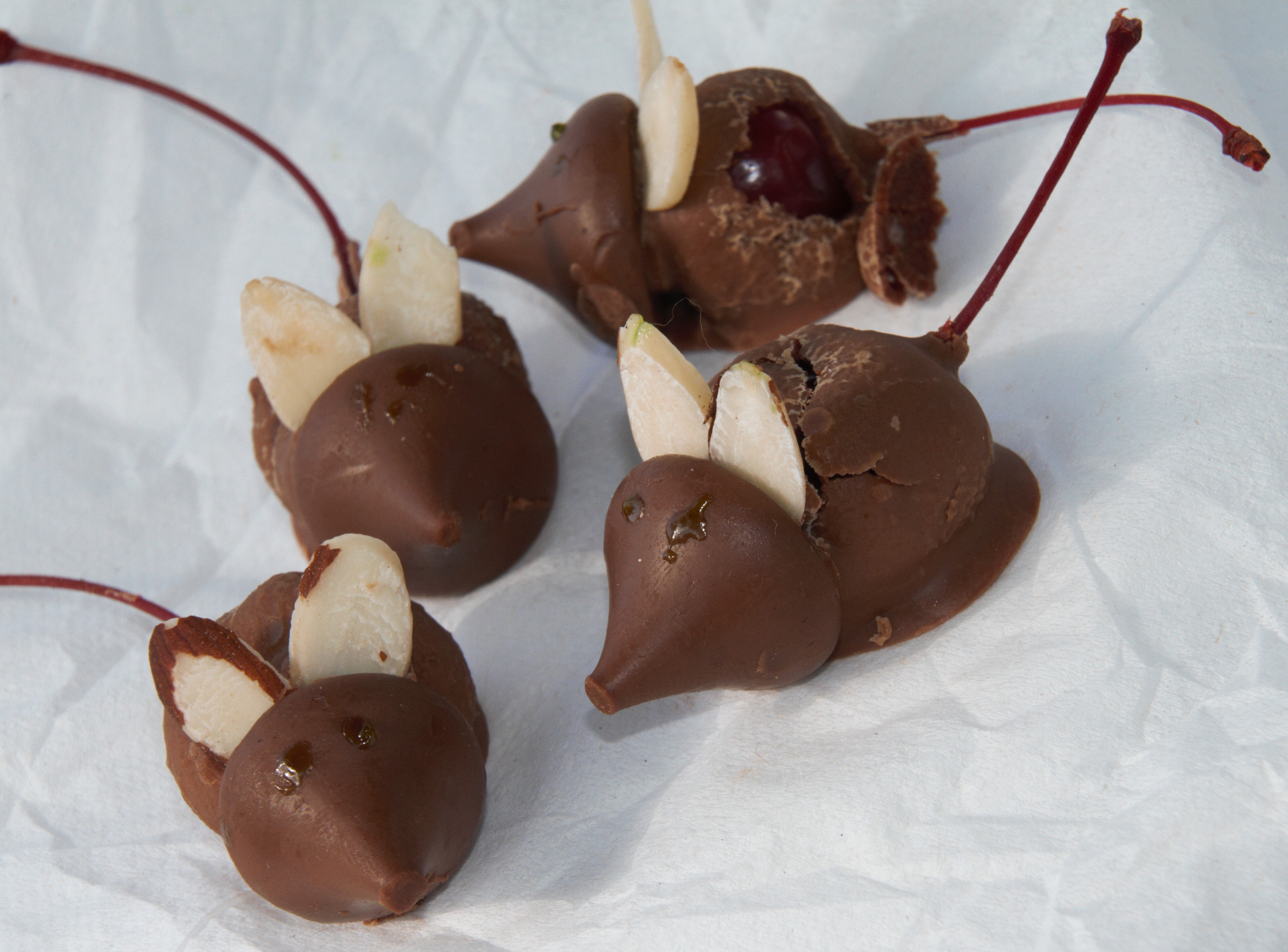
Home-made chocolate-covered cherry "mice"

The National Confectioners Association in the United States has designated January 3 as "National Chocolate-Covered Cherry Day."

== See also ==
- Cherry Mash
- Chocolate-covered prune
- Chocolate-covered raisins
- Chocolate-covered fruit
- List of chocolate-covered foods
- List of cherry dishes
- Rocky Road dessert
