= List of chocolate-covered foods =

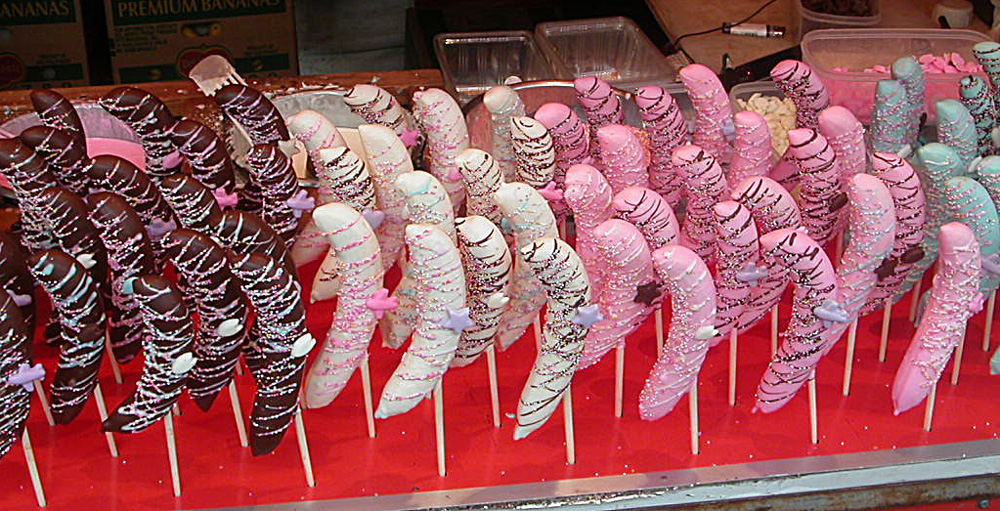
Chocolate-covered bananas in Japan

This is a list of chocolate-covered foods. Chocolate is a typically sweet, food preparation of Theobroma cacao seeds, roasted and ground, often flavored, as with vanilla. It is made in the form of a liquid, paste or in a block or used as a flavoring ingredient in other sweet foods.

== Chocolate-covered foods ==
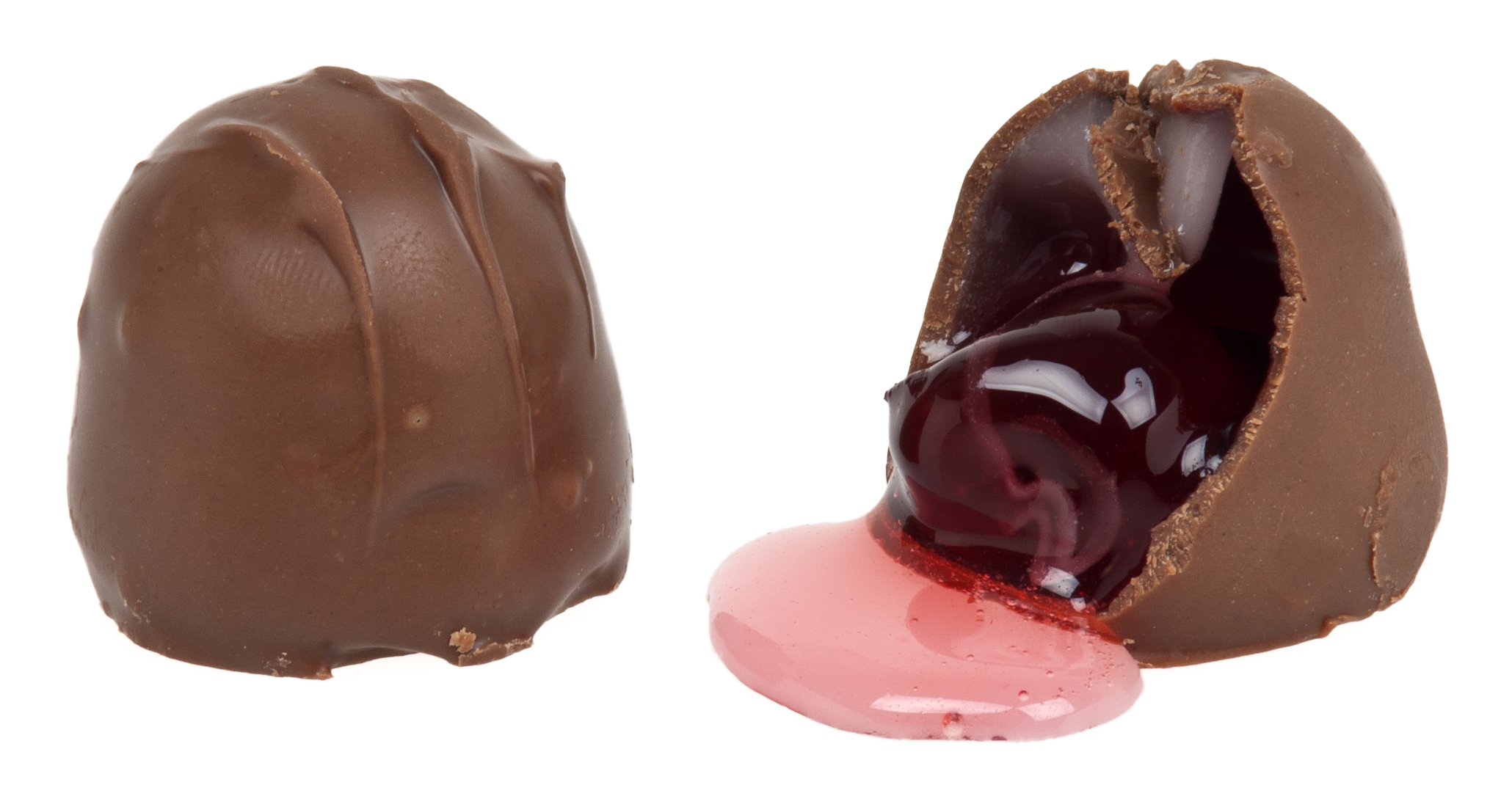
Cella's brand of cherry cordial confection

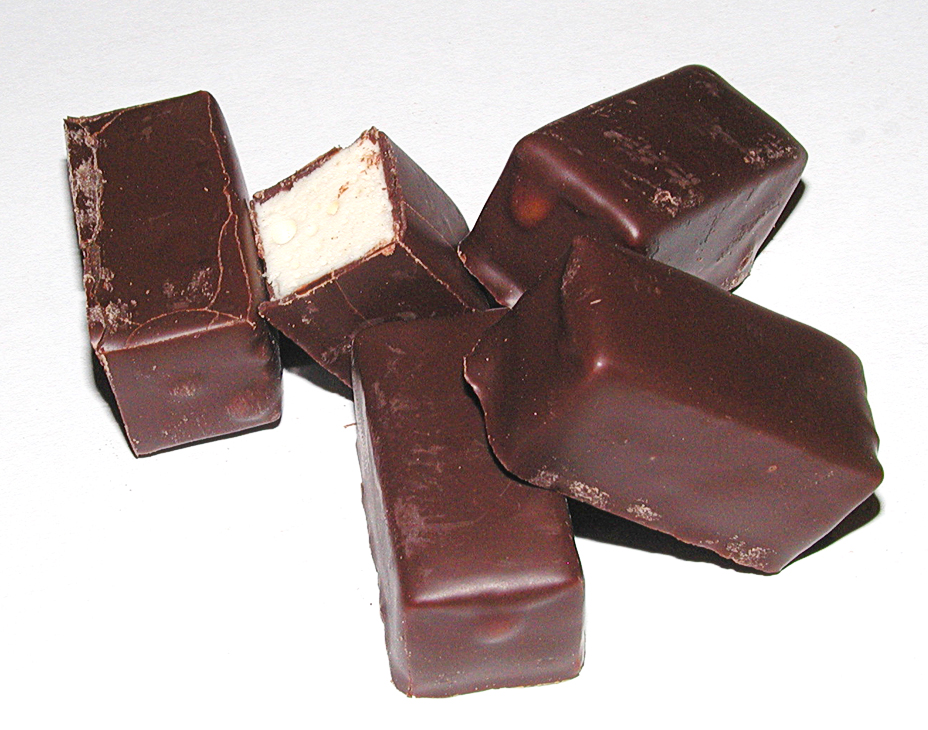
Ptasie mleczko, a soft chocolate-covered candy

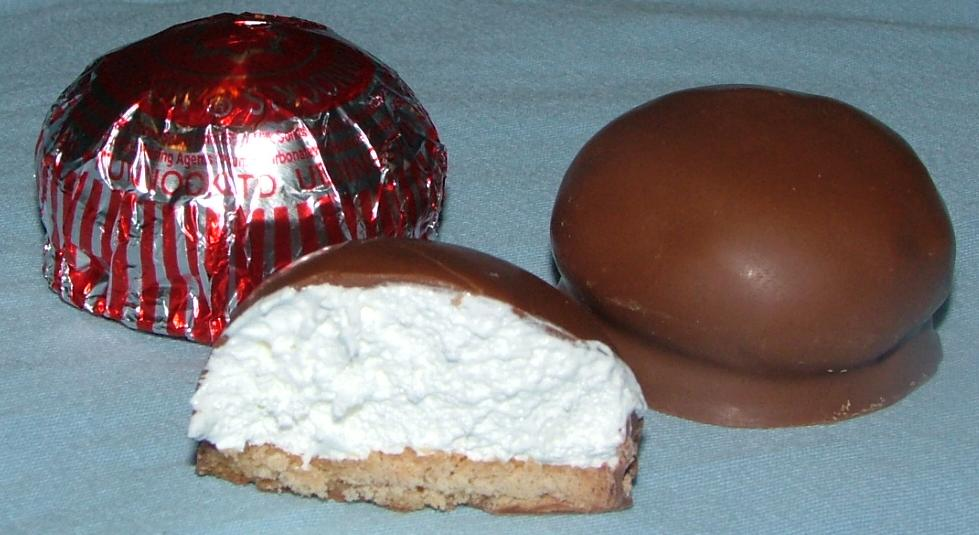
Tunnock's teacakes are a chocolate-covered marshmallow teacake.

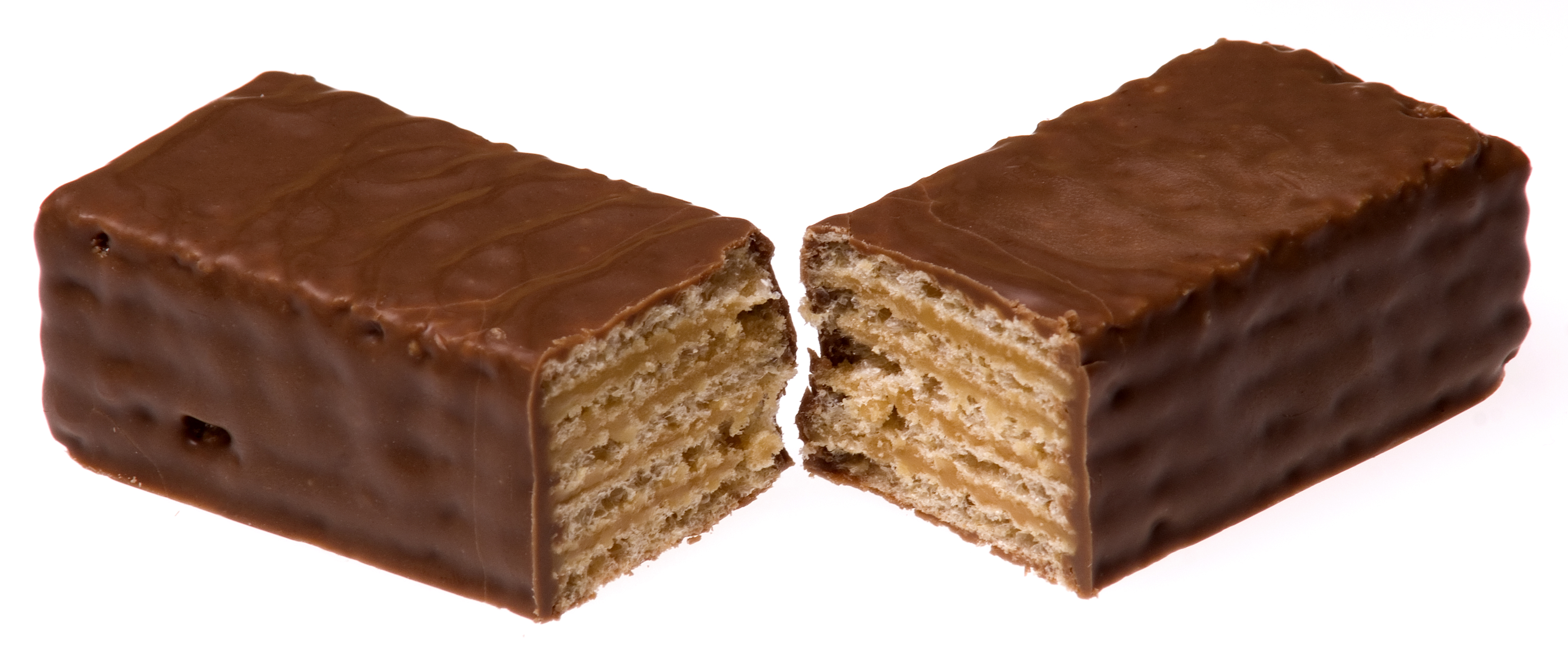
A chocolate-covered wafer

- Bon bon – small confection with chocolate shell and various type of fillings. Also known as chocolate praline.
- Caramel apple – although traditionally covered in just caramel or caramel and nuts, chocolate is often added, sometimes in decorative patterns.
- Chocolate biscuit – many types of biscuits (notably cookies, shortbreads, digestive biscuits, wafers) are often covered in chocolate
- Chocolate bar – many varieties have a chocolate coating
- Chocolate-coated marshmallow treats (including Peeps) – produced in different variations around the world, with several countries claiming to have invented it or hailing it as their "national confection". The first chocolate-coated marshmallow treat was created in the early 1800s in Denmark.
- Chocolate-coated peanut – peanuts coated in a shell of milk chocolate. They have a reputation in many countries of being food eaten in movie theaters. In some countries, they are also known as Goobers, which is the earliest and one of the most popular brands of the product, made by Nestlé. Goobers were introduced in the United States in 1925 by the Blumenthal Chocolate Company. Nestlé acquired the brand in 1984. A large number of other brands also exist.
- Chocolate-covered almonds – many places on the Internet claim that July 8 is (American) National Milk Chocolate with Almonds Day, while November 2 is National Bitter Chocolate with Almonds Day.
- Chocolate-covered fruit – such as strawberries, cherries and bananas

- Chocolate-covered cherry – variations include cherry cordial (candy) with liquid fillings often including cherry liqueur, as well as chocolate covered candied cherries and chocolate covered dried cherries.
- Chocolate-covered prune – chocolate-covered prunes or plums are a typical Polish delicacy.

- Chocolate-covered bacon – a North American novelty that consists of cooked bacon with a coating of either milk chocolate or dark chocolate. It can be topped with sea salt, crumbled pistachio, or almond bits.
- Chocolate-covered coffee bean – confections made by coating roasted coffee beans in some kind of chocolate: dark chocolate, milk chocolate, or white chocolate. They are usually only slightly sweet, especially the dark chocolate kind, and the intense, bitter flavor of the coffee beans can be overwhelming for non–coffee-drinkers.
- Chocolate-covered potato chips – an American snack food or confectionery, consisting of potato chips that have been dipped into melted chocolate or cocoa, and coated with the chocolate. They were introduced into the market in Chicago in 1985 by a company called Executive Sweets.
- Chocolate-covered raisin – raisins coated in a shell of milk, dark or white chocolate. Commonly available in movie theaters in many countries, they were traditionally sold by weight from jars in candy stores.
- Chocolate truffle – chocolate confectionery traditionally made with a chocolate ganache center and coated in cocoa powder, coconut, or chopped nuts.
- Club – a range of chocolate covered biscuits sold in Ireland under the Jacob's brand name and in the United Kingdom under McVitie's
- Cordials – confection in which a fruit filling is placed within a chocolate shell. A well known confectionery of this type is the cherry cordial.
- Doughnut – several varieties are covered in chocolate
- Ice cream bar - many varieties of ice cream on a stick, covered with chocolate, such as the Eskimo Pie or Dairy Queen's Dilly Bar
- Lebkuchen – special type of gingerbread, sometimes covered with chocolate
- Mars bar – filled with caramel
- Snickers – filled with peanuts and caramel
- Liqueur chocolate – chocolate filled with alcoholic liquids
- Chocolate covered nuts, including Macadamia nuts – the nuts can be covered individually or in clumps or bars
- Milk Duds – a caramel candy, historically enrobed with milk chocolate, and presently enrobed with a confectionery coating made from chocolate and vegetable oil
- Pretzel – some varieties are produced with a chocolate coating
- Ptasie mleczko – (Polish) a soft chocolate-covered candy filled with soft meringue (or milk soufflé)
- Túró Rudi – chocolate-coated curd bars
- Tunnock's teacake – manufactured by Thomas Tunnock, they consist of a small round shortbread biscuit covered with Italian meringue, and then encased in a thin layer of milk or dark chocolate and wrapped.
- Wafer – some varieties are covered or coated with chocolate
- Winter ice cream – wafer cones filled with flavored cream and coated with chocolate
- Zefir – a type of soft confectionery made by whipping fruit and berry purée (mostly apple puree) with sugar and egg whites with subsequent addition of a gelling agent like pectin, agar, or gelatine. Chocolate-coated versions are common.
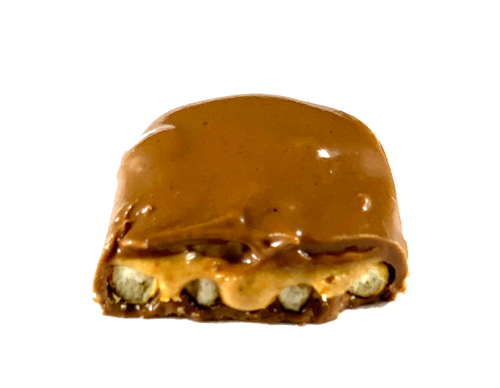
A Take 5 chocolate bar with chocolate covered peanut butter, peanuts, pretzel and caramel

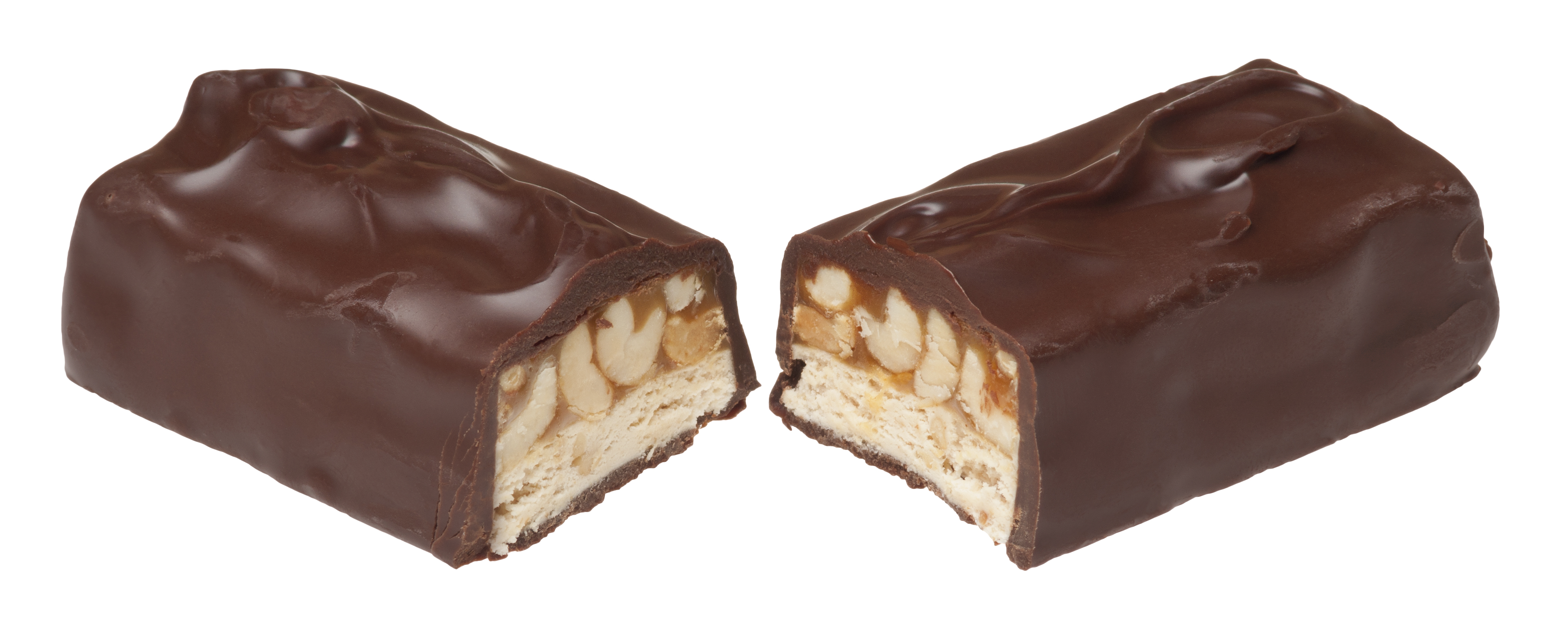
A Snickers chocolate bar covered in dark chocolate

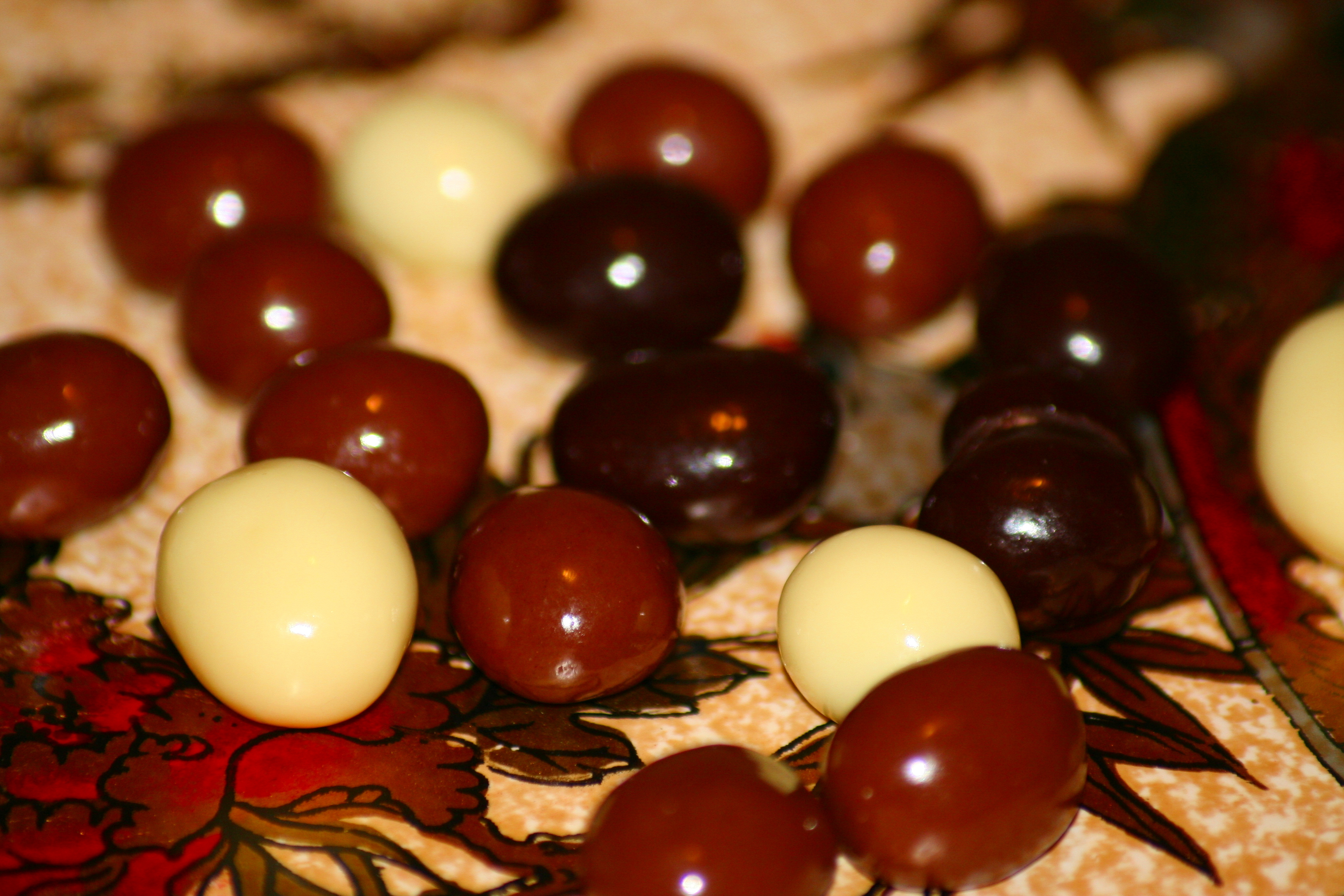
A mix of white, milk, and dark chocolate-covered coffee beans

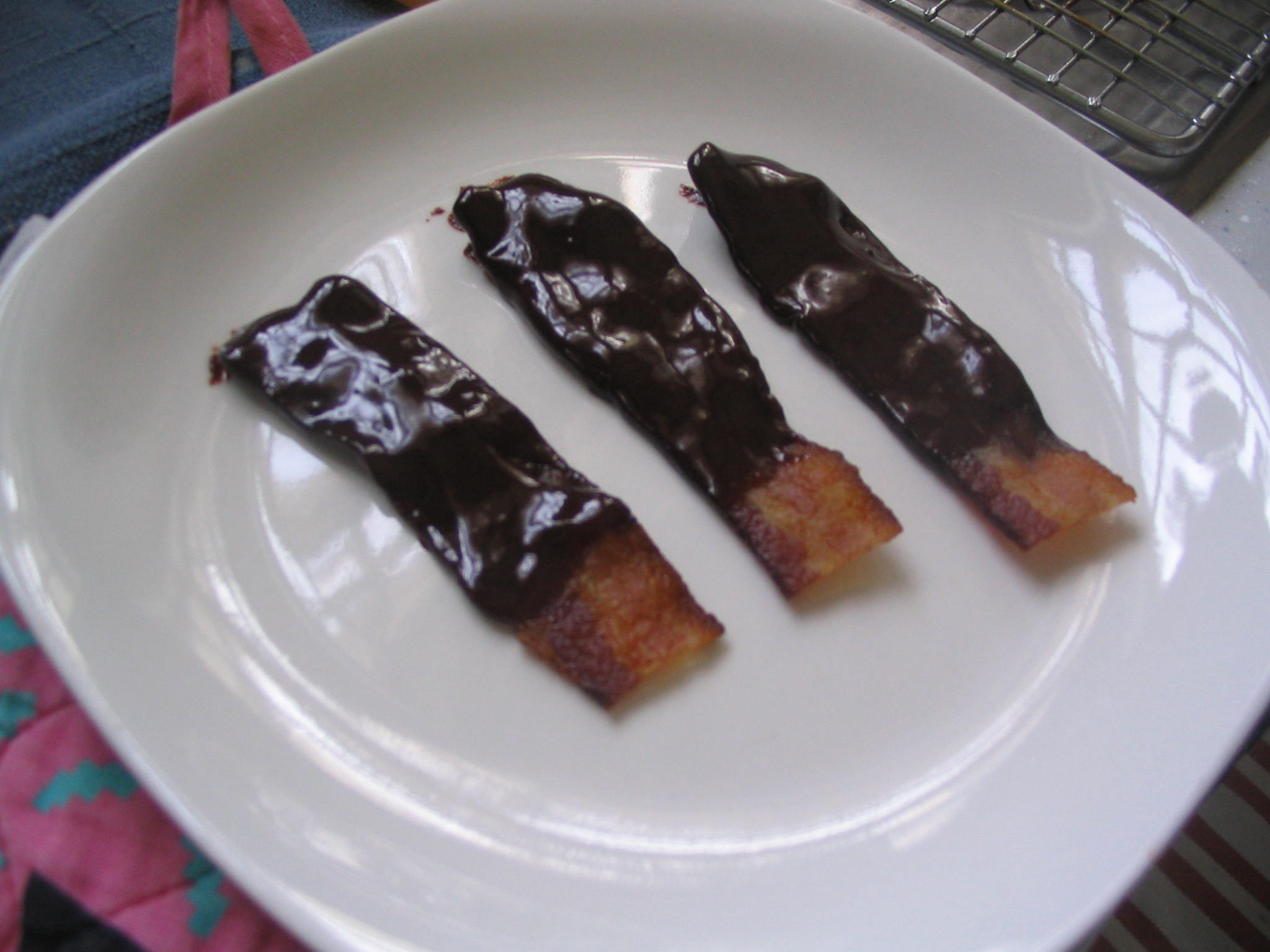
Chocolate-covered bacon, dipped in chocolate ganache

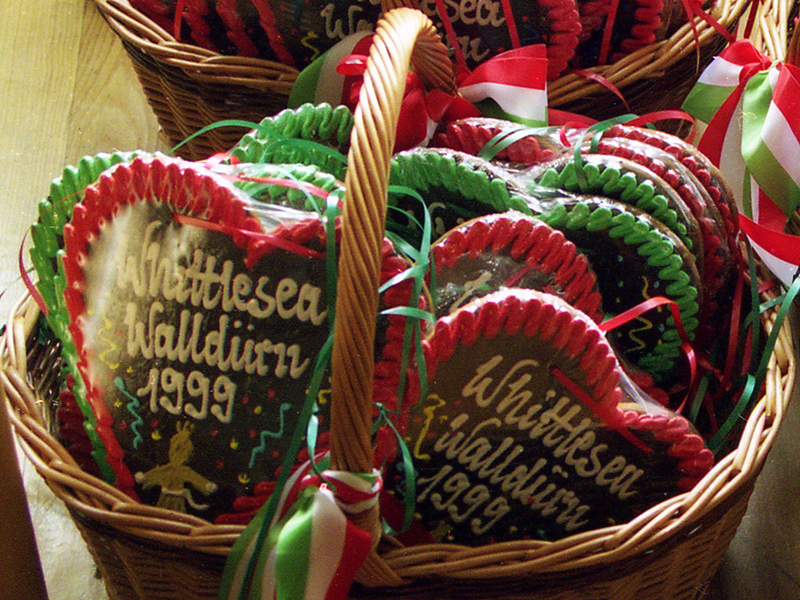
Lebkuchen at a market

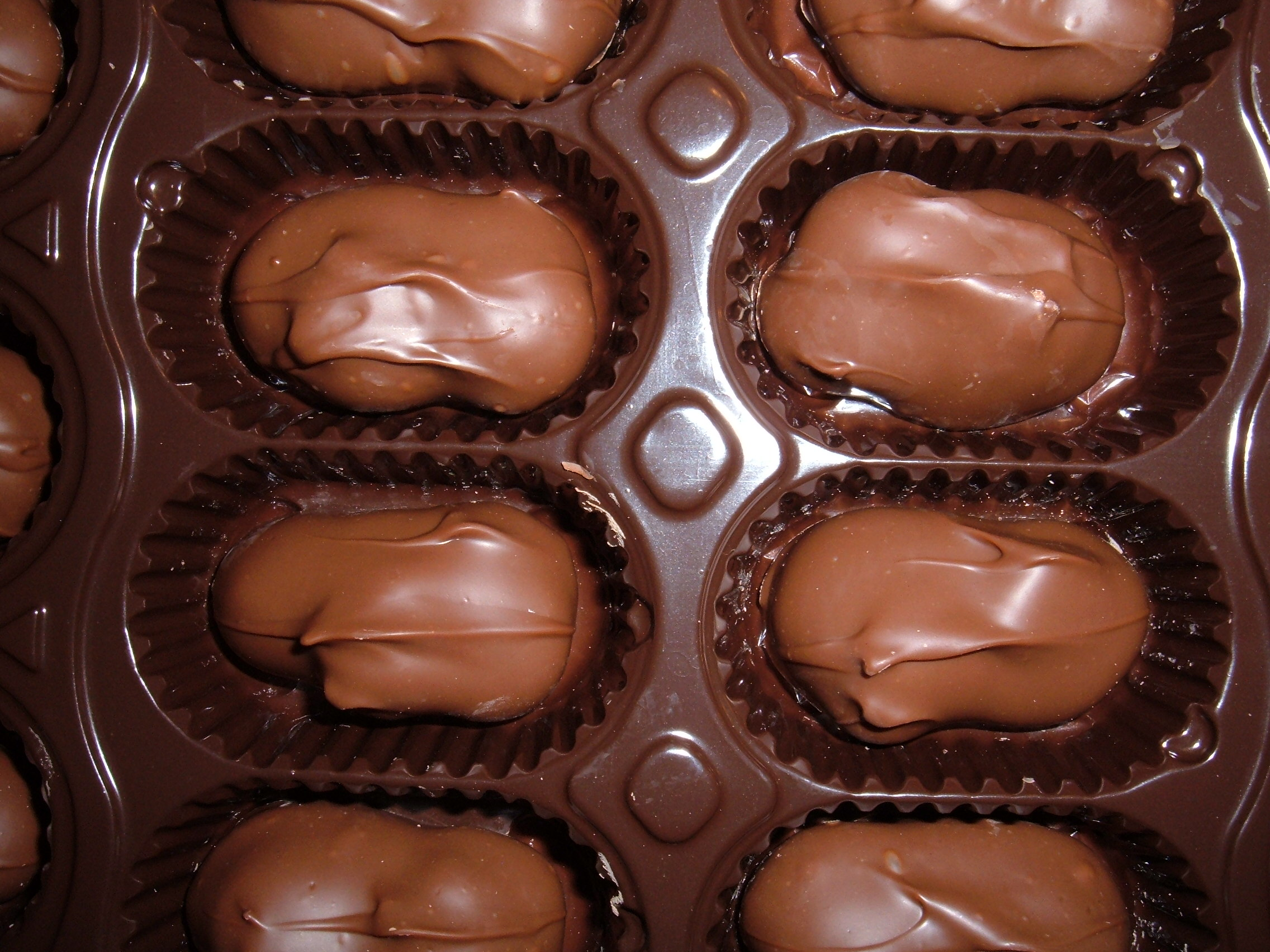
Chocolate-covered macadamia nuts

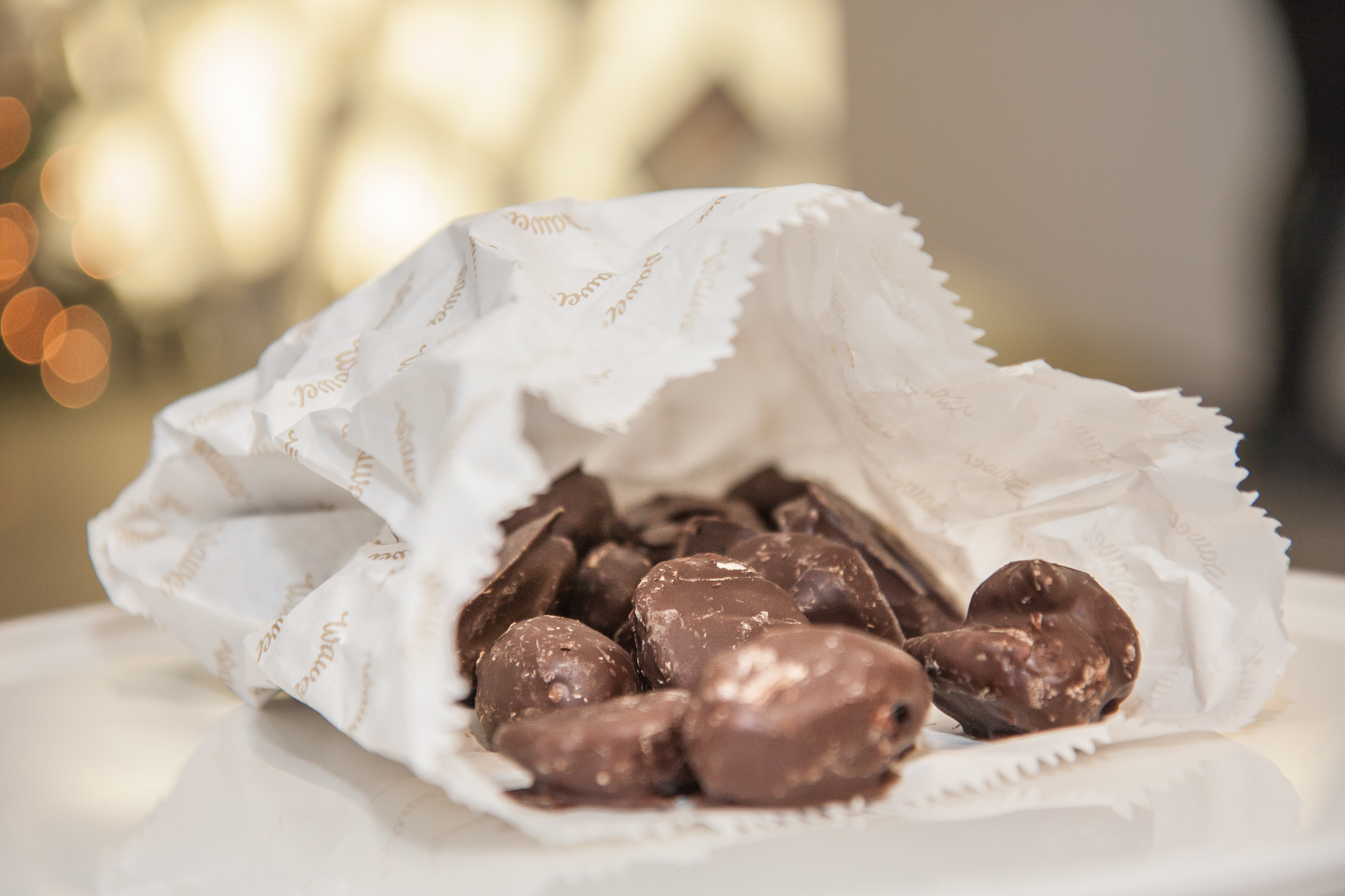
Chocolate-covered plums

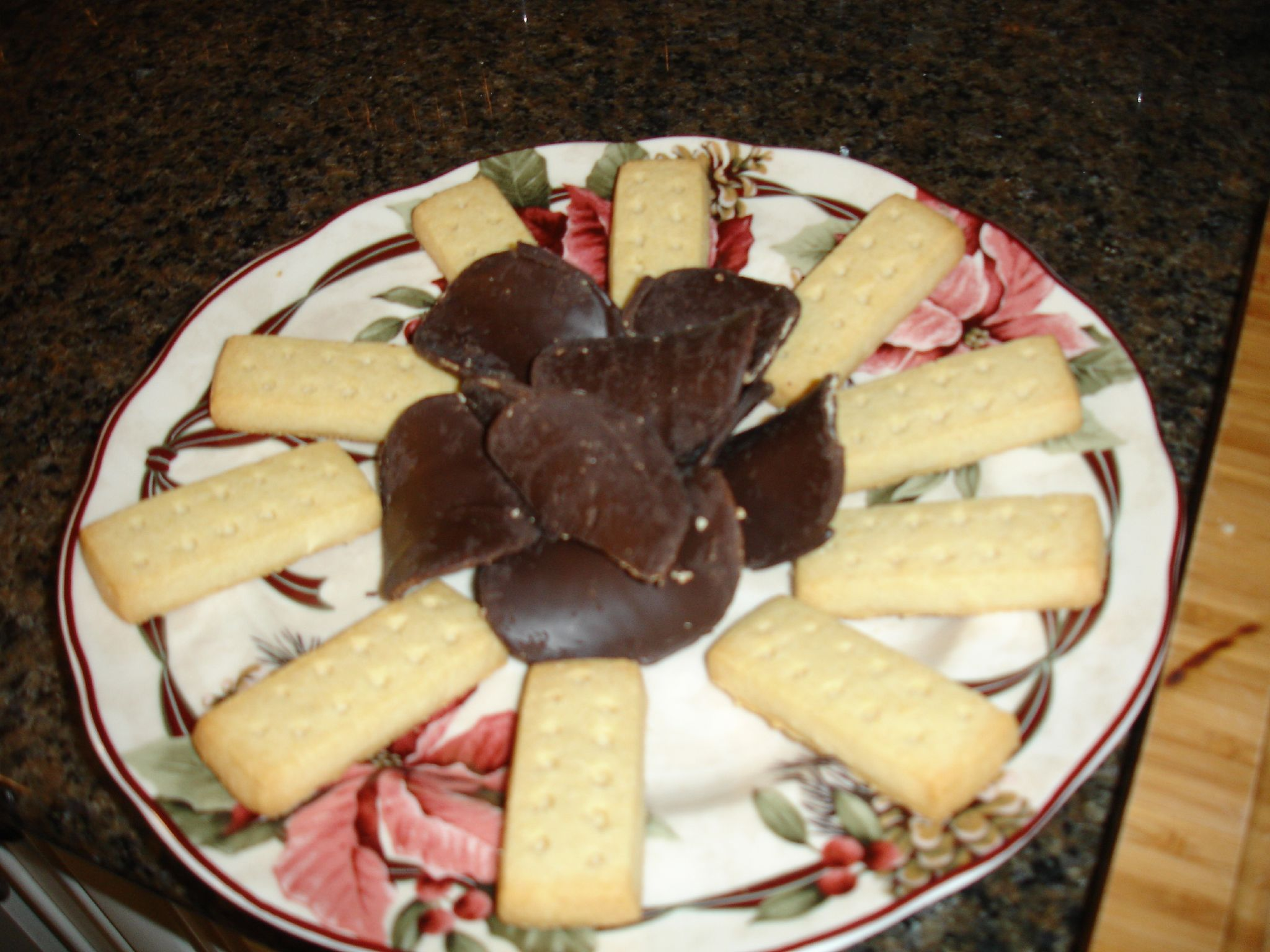
Chocolate-covered potato chips (center), with shortbread cookies around them

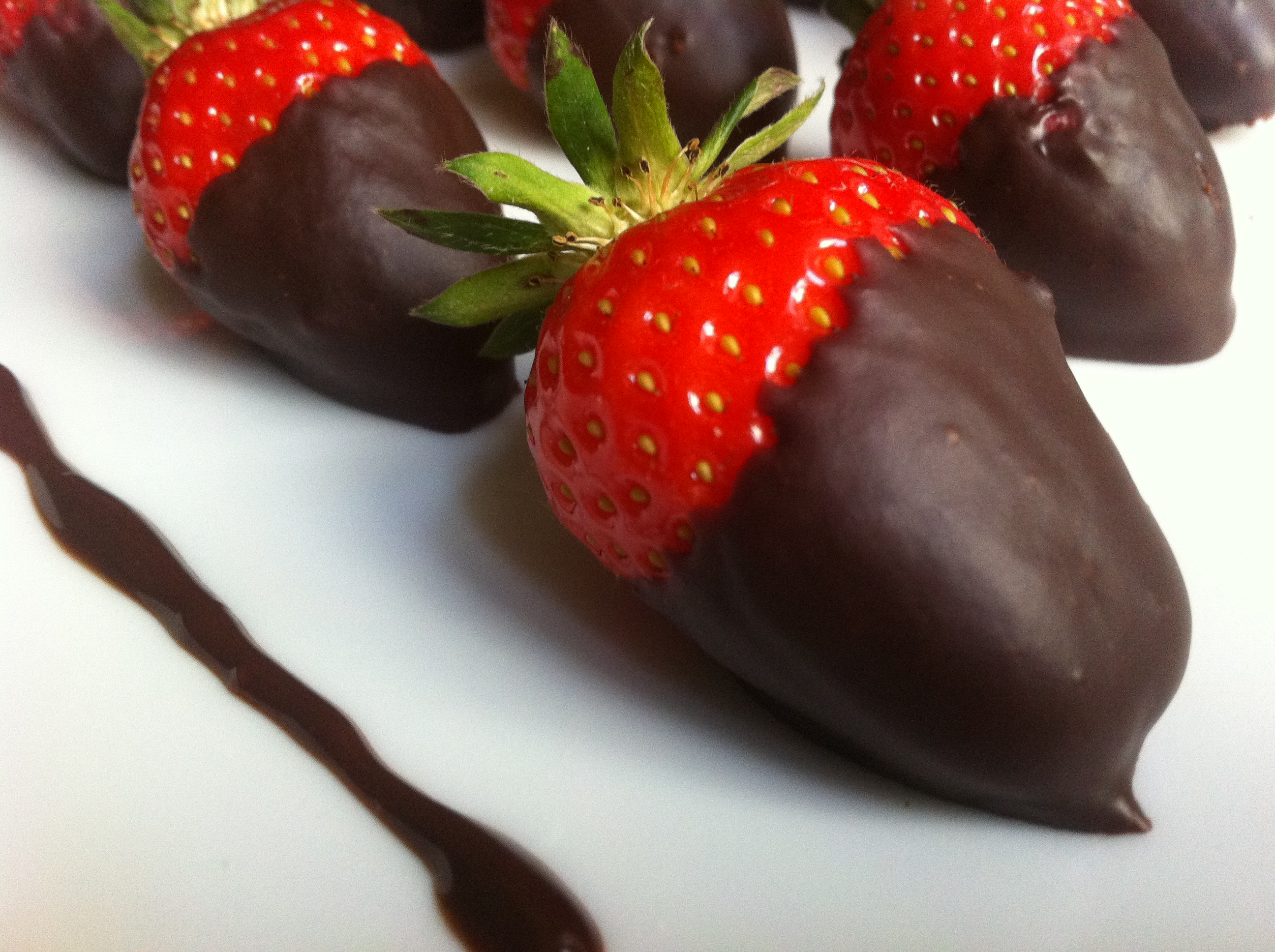
Chocolate-covered strawberries

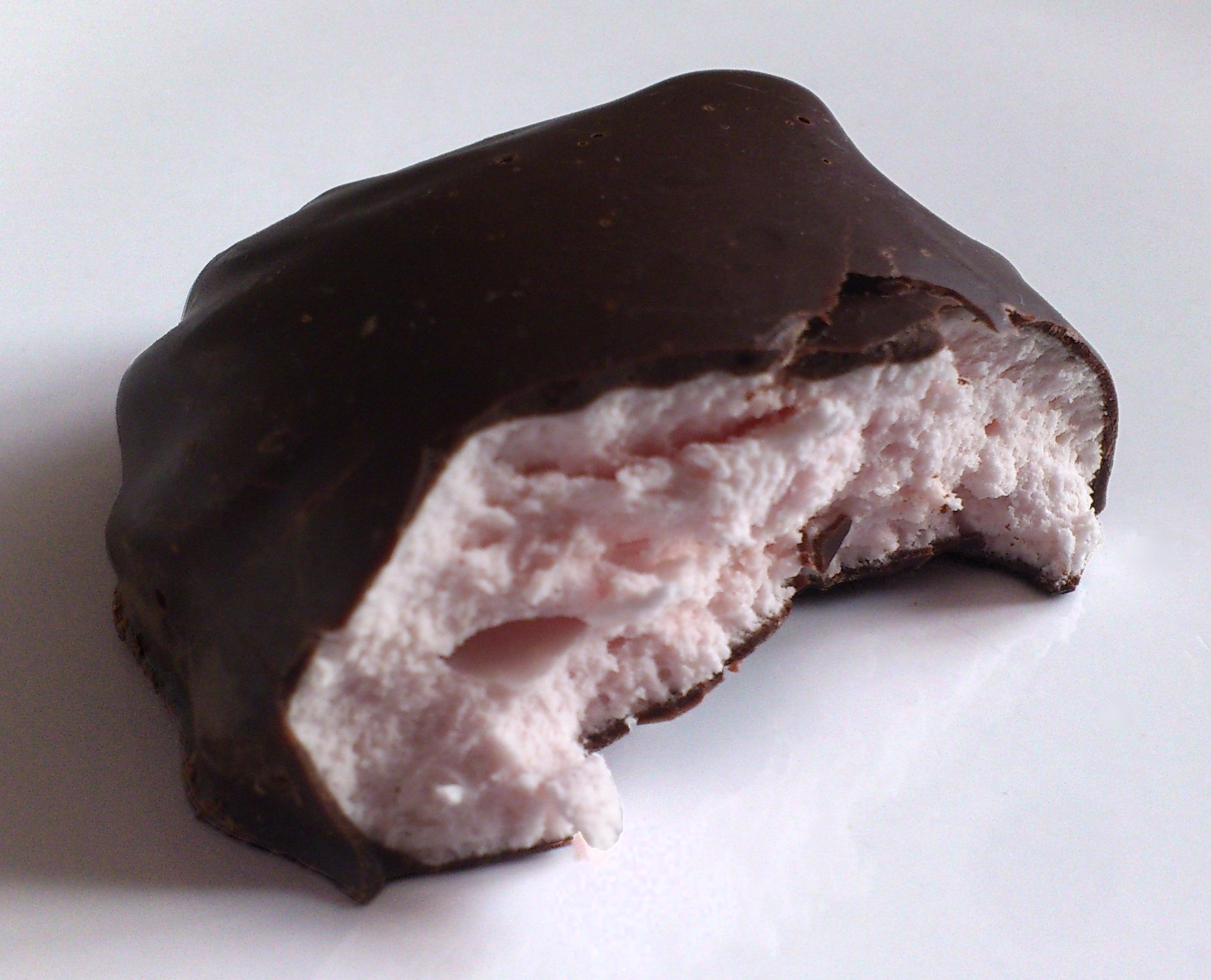
A chocolate-covered zefir

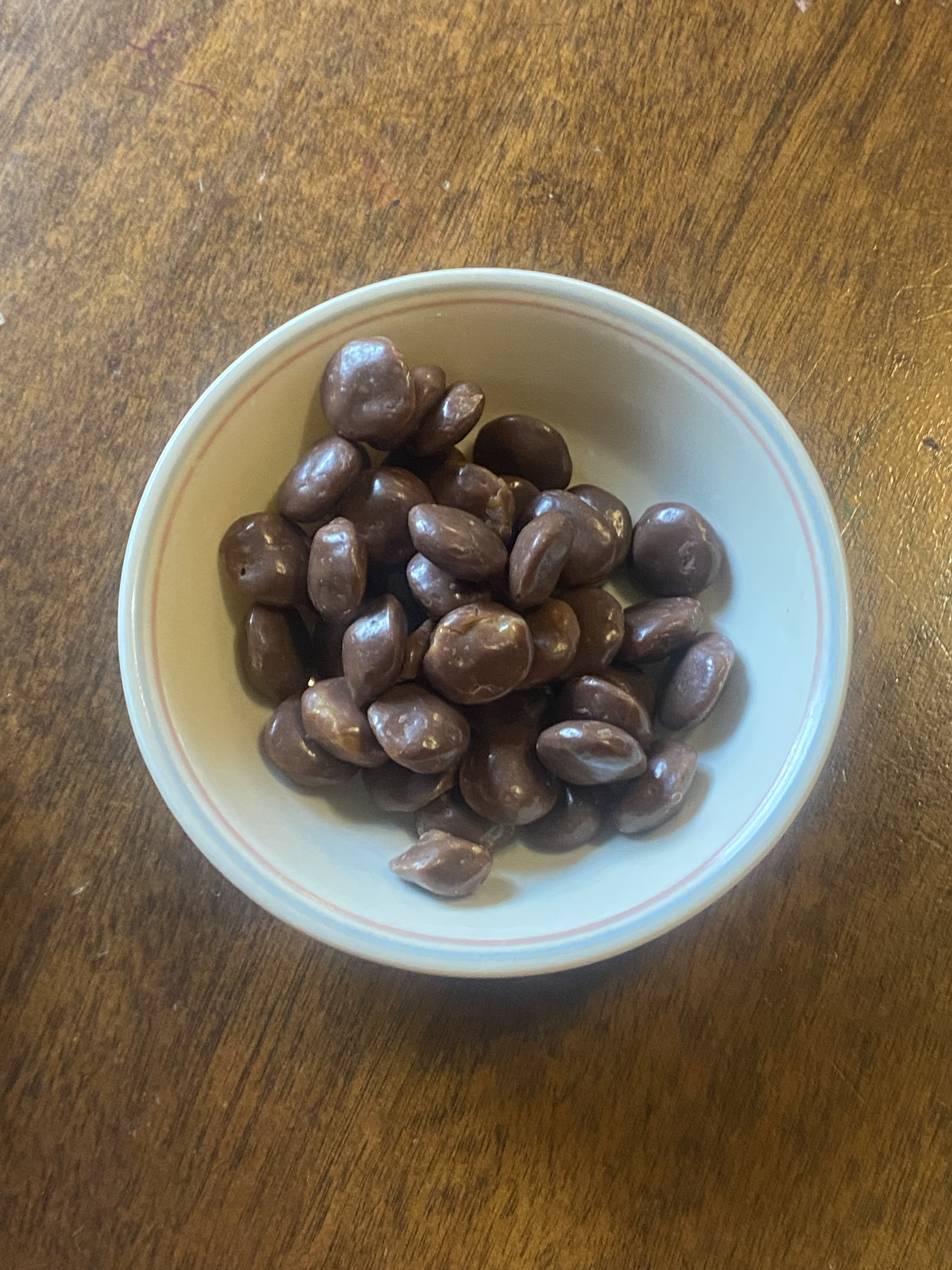
Chocolate covered caramel candies, Milk Duds in a bowl

== Similar dishes ==
- Chocolate fountain – a device for serving chocolate fondue. Typical examples resemble a stepped cone, standing 2–4 feet tall with a crown at the top and stacked tiers over a basin at the bottom. The basin is heated to keep the chocolate in a liquid state so it can be pulled into a center cylinder then vertically transported to the top of the fountain by a corkscrew auger. From there it flows over the tiers creating a chocolate "waterfall" in which foods such as strawberries or marshmallows can be dipped.
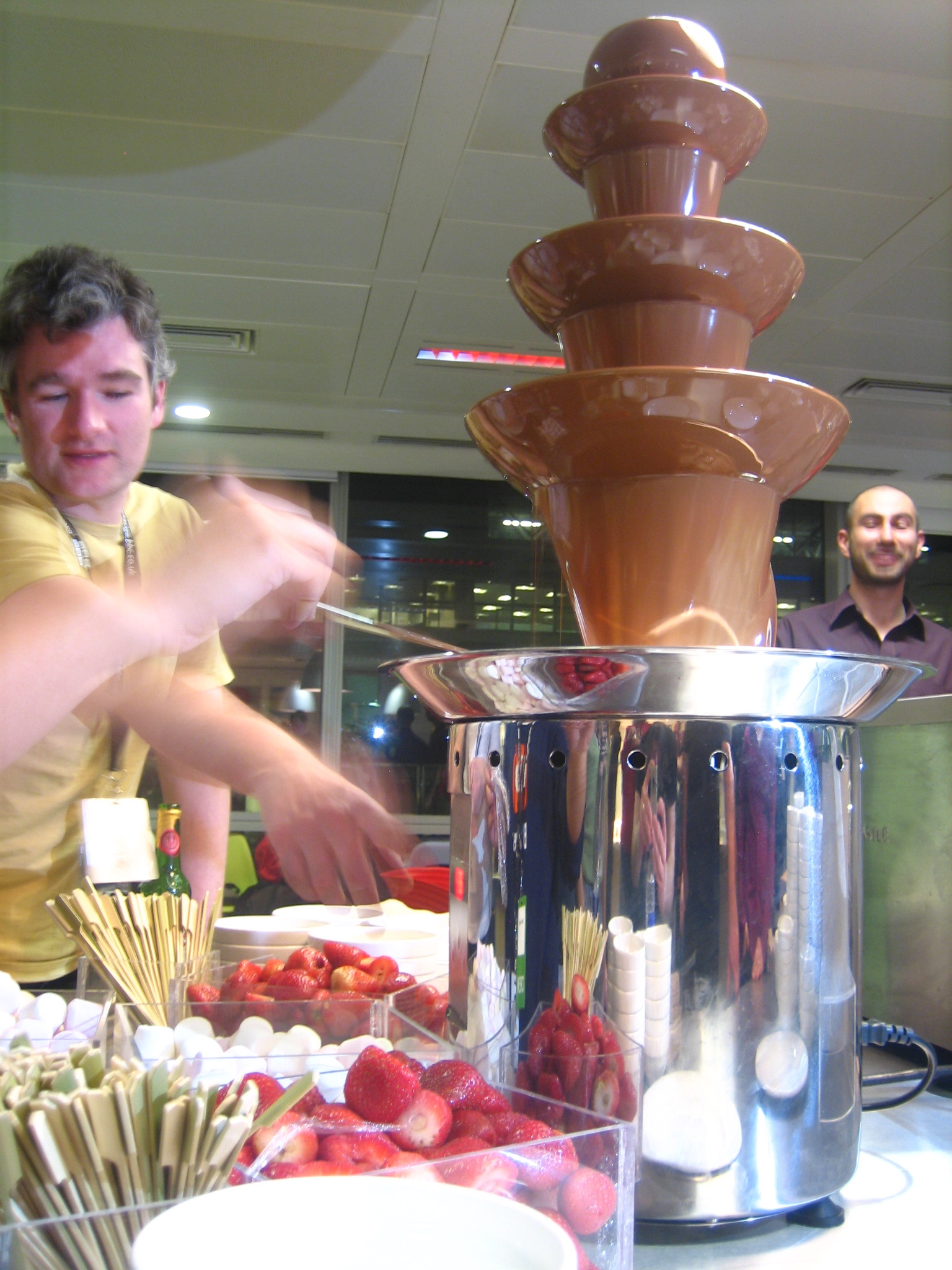
Various foods dipped into a chocolate fountain

== See also ==
- List of chocolate bar brands
- List of chocolate drinks
- Outline of chocolate
- Types of chocolate
