= Sno-Caps =

Brand of candy

- A pile of Sno-Caps
- Product type: Chocolate Nonpareils
- Current owner: Ferrero Group
- Produced by: Ferrara Candy Company
- Country: United States
- Introduced: 1927; 99 years ago
- Markets: United States; Canada
- Previous owners: Blumenthal Brothers Chocolate Company; Ward Candy Company; Terson Company; Nestlé

Sno-Caps is a brand of candy consisting of small pieces of semi-sweet chocolate candy covered with white nonpareils. Sno-Caps can be found around the world and are commonly associated with movie theaters, where they are often sold at concession stands.

== History of Sno-Caps ==
Sno-Caps were introduced in 1927 by the Blumenthal Chocolate Company. The company heavily marketed the candy, along with their other confections Goobers and Malties, to movie theaters.

A box of Sno-Caps manufactured by Nestlé

Ward Foods acquired Blumenthal via a merger in 1969, and was itself subsequently purchased by the Chicago-based Terson Company in 1981. Nestlé then acquired Ward and its brands on January 9, 1984, from Terson following the bankruptcy of the candy subsidiary. In 2018, the brand was purchased by Ferrara Candy Company, a division of Ferrero SpA, as part of Ferrero's acquisition of Nestlé's American confectionary operations.

As of 2026, Sno-Caps are widely available in the United States. While uncommon in grocery and convenience stores, they remain a staple of movie theater concession stands and candy stores.
