= World's Finest Chocolate =

Chicago chocolate company since 1939

- Company type: Private
- Founded: 1939; 87 years ago
- Founder: Edmond Opler Sr.
- Headquarters: Chicago, Illinois, U.S.
- Products: Chocolate
- Website: www.worldsfinestchocolate.com

World's Finest Chocolate is a chocolate company based in Chicago, Illinois. The company, founded in 1939, has become a large fundraising organization in the United States which typically holds fundraisers for school districts.

== History ==
World's Finest Chocolate was founded under the name Cook Chocolate Company by Edmond Opler Sr. in 1939.

He started the division that produced chocolate bars for fundraising in 1949 and called it "World's Finest Chocolate".

In 1972, the company's name was changed to "World's Finest Chocolate". In 1985, the company moved into a 500,000-square-foot factory. Opler's son, Edmond Jr., has run the company since Edmond Sr. retired in 1988.

In 2006, World's Finest Chocolate acquired the company Queen Anne, a brand of cordial cherries. In June 2015, the company acquired Market Day, a frozen food store.

In 2021, World's Finest Chocolate started a monthly $2K Giveaway for teachers. The company also donated around 10 million chocolate bars to COVID-19 doctors and nurses.

== Corporate affairs ==
The company specializes in Fundraising events. It manufactures chocolate bars from a cocoa farm in St. Lucia. and has a production site in South Chicago.

== Products ==
The core of the company's business is selling chocolate bars in bulk for school fundraisers and corporate gifts.

World's Finest Chocolate is one of the largest suppliers of the fundraising chocolate market. According to the company it has sold more than 6 billion chocolate bars, their best-known product, and helped their customers raise more than USD 4.4 billion since 1949.
