= Chocolate-covered coffee bean =

Type of confection

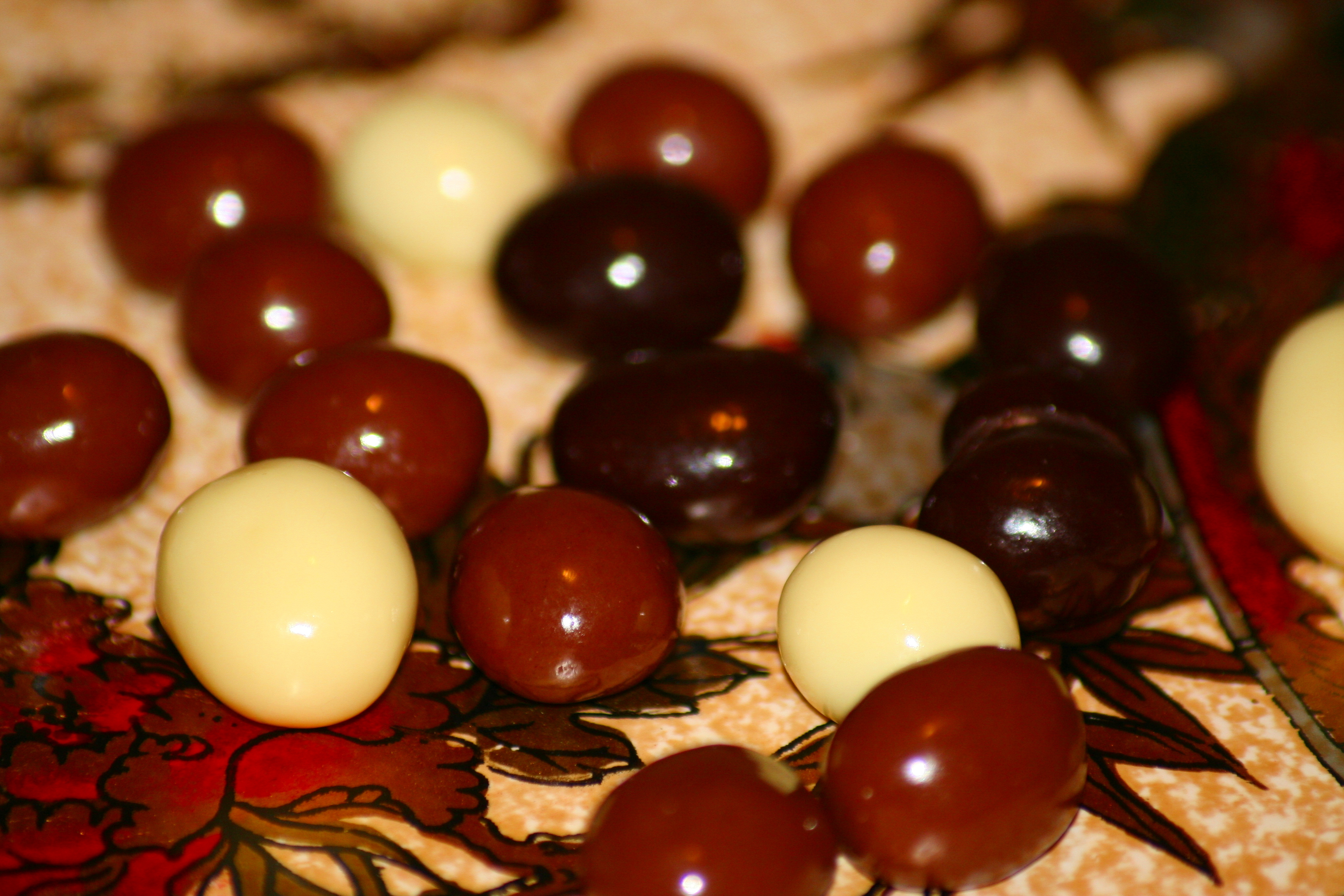
- A mix of white, milk, and dark chocolate coffee beans
- Alternative names: Chocolate covered espresso beans
- Type: Confectionery
- Place of origin: United States
- Main ingredients: Coffee beans, chocolate

Chocolate-covered coffee beans are confections made by coating roasted coffee beans in some kind of chocolate, typically milk chocolate but often also dark chocolate or white chocolate. They are usually only slightly sweet, especially the dark chocolate kind, and the coffee bean has a bitter flavor.

Like all chocolate products, they are rich in fat, and since their main ingredient is coffee beans, they are very high in caffeine; some brands contain over 300 mg of caffeine per 40 g serving.

== See also ==
- List of chocolate-covered foods
- List of coffee dishes
- List of desserts
