= Chocolate-covered almonds =

Type of confection

Chocolate almonds
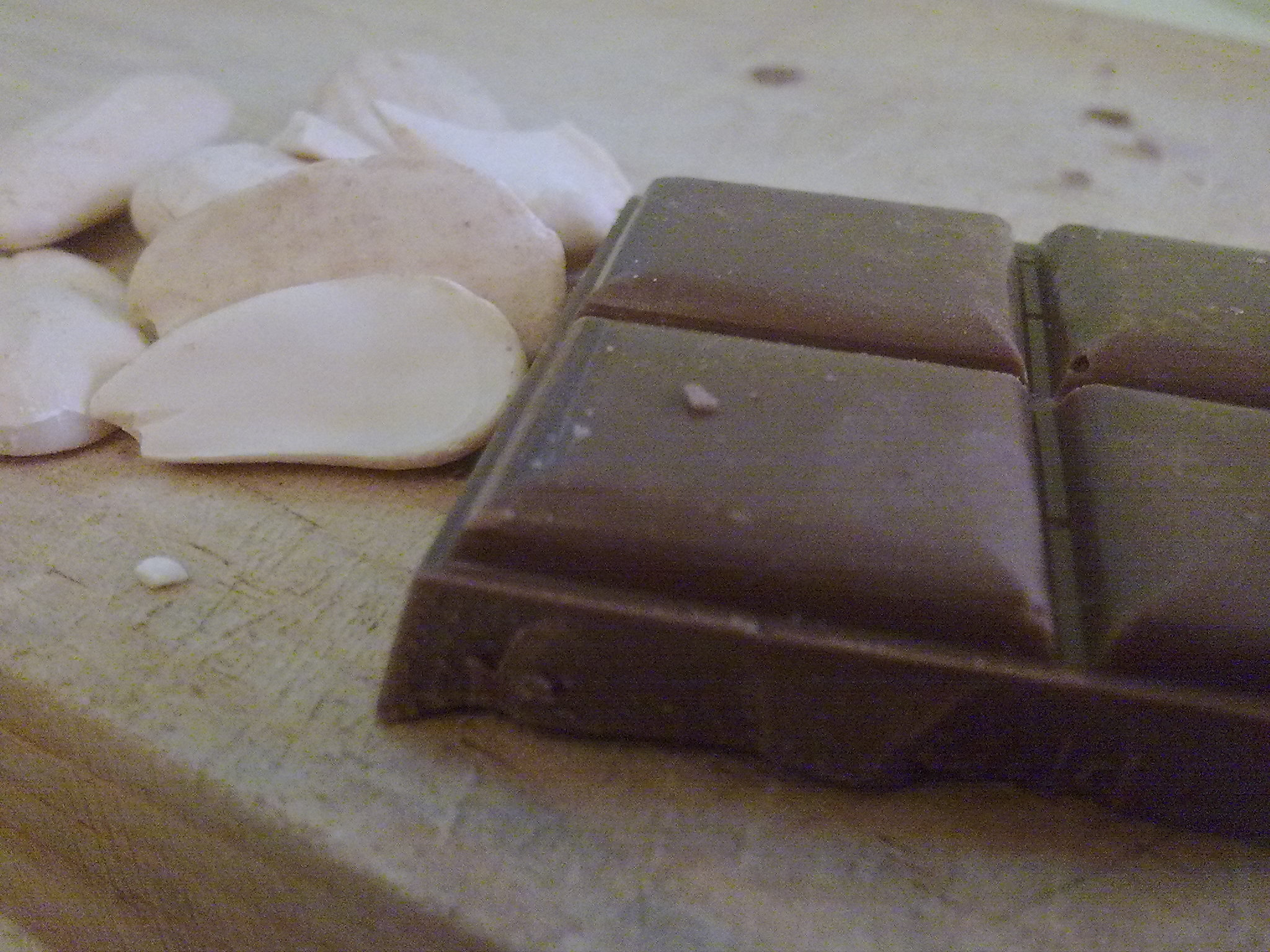
- Chocolate and almonds
- Type: Confection
- Main ingredients: Almonds and chocolate.
- Food energy (per serving): 230kcal/40g

Chocolate-covered almonds are a confection created by covering almonds with chocolate.

== History ==
In 1742, William Parks printed a copy of Eliza Smith's cookbook, The Compleat Housewife. "Chocolate almonds" was the only chocolate recipe it contained despite the popularity of chocolate among the wealthy at the time.

Many places on the internet claim that July 8 is (American) National Milk Chocolate with Almonds Day, while November 7 is National Chocolate with Bitter Almonds Day.

== See also ==
- List of chocolate-covered foods
