= Blumenthal Brothers Chocolate Company =

Defunct American chocolate manufacturer

The Blumenthal Brothers Chocolate Company was a Philadelphia-based chocolate manufacturer that existed from 1909 to 1984. Its factory was located at Margaret and James Streets in the city's Frankford neighborhood.

== History ==
The company was founded in 1909 and existed under Blumenthal family management until 1969 when it was sold to Ward Foods, a New York-based conglomerate best known for making Tip Top bread. The principal reason for the sale, reportedly, was that few of the third generation of Blumenthals were interested in managing the company. After the sale, a new company, Ward Candy, was formed with Bernhard S. Blumenthal as its president.

=== Legal difficulties ===
In 1968, Louis Perez, a Blumenthal employee, sued the company in the Supreme Court of Pennsylvania, claiming he was forced to work in exposure to a heavy concentration of dust and excessive heat in his employment. The high court affirmed the lower court's decision in his favor, forcing the company to compensate him.

In 1974, the company was again taken to court, this time for falsification of its gross income by secretly manufacturing products outside the state of Pennsylvania, keeping on average $5 million a year from being disclosed.

The court cases crippled the company financially and eventually led to bankruptcy. In 1984, Terson Company and its Ward brands, best known for their Chunky chocolate candy, divested the combined candy companies to Nestle and the rights to its products to ensure its legacy. Most recently, Nestle sold the company, among others, to Ferrero in January 2018 for $2.8 billion.

== Notable candies ==
- Goobers, chocolate-coated peanuts introduced in 1925.
- Malties, chocolate-covered malt balls
- Fruit and Nut Bridge Mix
- Milk Chocolate Treats, which were nearly identical to Hershey Kisses.
- Chunky, trapezoidal chocolate bar with nuts and raisins
- Sno-Caps, semi-sweet chocolate candies covered with white nonpareils introduced in 1927.
- Raisinets, chocolate-coated raisins introduced in 1927.
