= Chocolate-covered raisin =

Confectionery

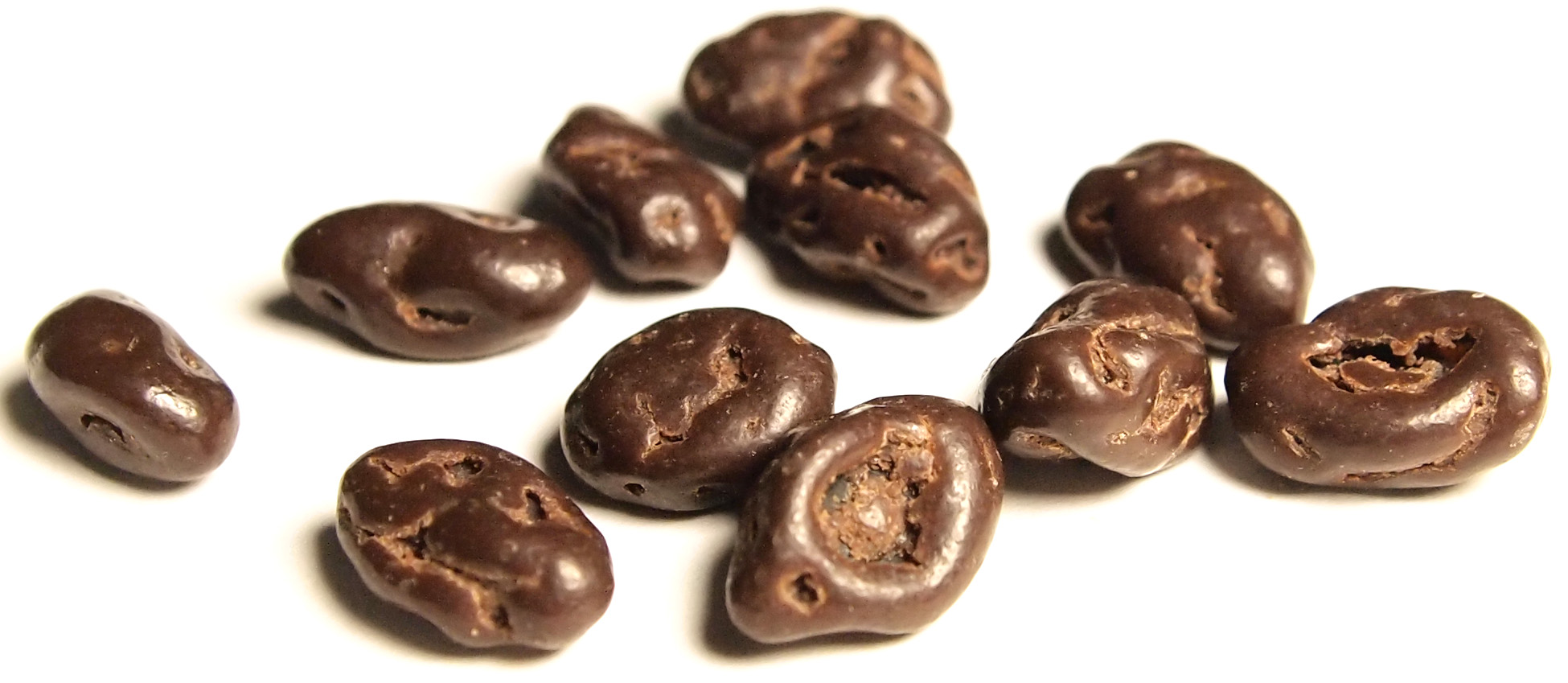
- Raisins covered in dark chocolate
- Type: Confectionery
- Main ingredients: Raisins, milk chocolate, dark chocolate or white chocolate
- Food energy (per serving): Variable (dependent on raisin size and caloric sub-ratio density of the coating, irrespective of whether milk or dark chocolate is used)

Chocolate-covered raisins are a candy consisting of individual raisins coated in a shell of milk, dark or white chocolate.

== Varieties and brands ==
Raisinets, a brand of chocolate-covered raisin

In the United States, they are also known as Raisinets, which is the earliest and one of the most popular brands of the product, currently made by Ferrara, a subsidiary of Ferrero SpA. Raisinets were introduced in the United States in 1927 by the Blumenthal Chocolate Company. Ferrero acquired the brand in 2018 from Nestlé, who had briefly expanded the brand to include milk chocolate-covered dried cranberries and dried cherries from late 2009 through 2013. A large number of other brands also exist, including:

- In the United Kingdom, chocolate raisins are considered a classic sweetshop confectionery and can be found in many supermarkets, in plastic sharing bags under supermarket branding and in corner shops. Around Christmas time, chocolate raisins are also sold with milk, white and dark chocolate coatings as a festive treat in boxed packaging.
- In Canada, the Glosette brand was introduced in the 1930s by the Walter M. Lowney Company of Canada. It currently consists of various chocolate-covered candies, including Glosette Raisins, Glosette Peanuts, and Glosette Almonds. The candies are sold in small cardboard boxes rather than a typical plastic wrapper. Lowney was acquired in the 1970s by Nabisco. The Lowney brand, including Glosettes, was bought by Hershey Canada on July 1, 1987.
- In Australia, these sweets are more commonly referred to as chocolate-covered sultanas, rather than raisins. In Australia, there are no particularly prominent brands in the market, although chocolate-covered sultanas are produced by some large local confectioners and also on the behalf of supermarket chains as store-brand versions.
- In Peru, there is a popular brand named Fochis which are chocolate covered raisin made by Compañía Nacional de Chocolates de Perú S.A

The Promotion in Motion Companies, Inc, the candy company that manufactures Welch's Fruit Snacks, also manufactures a Sun-Maid brand of chocolate-covered raisins.

There is a non-dairy equivalent made of sugar (non-refined), cocoa mass, cocoa butter, raisins and vanillin.

A similar food, also commonly sold at movie theaters, is the chocolate-covered peanut. As described above, the two products are often combined for consumption in a mixture. Less common alternatives are the chocolate-covered almond or the chocolate-covered macadamia nut.

== See also ==
- List of chocolate-covered foods
- List of raisin dishes and foods
