= Cella's =

Brand of chocolate-covered cherries

Cella's logo

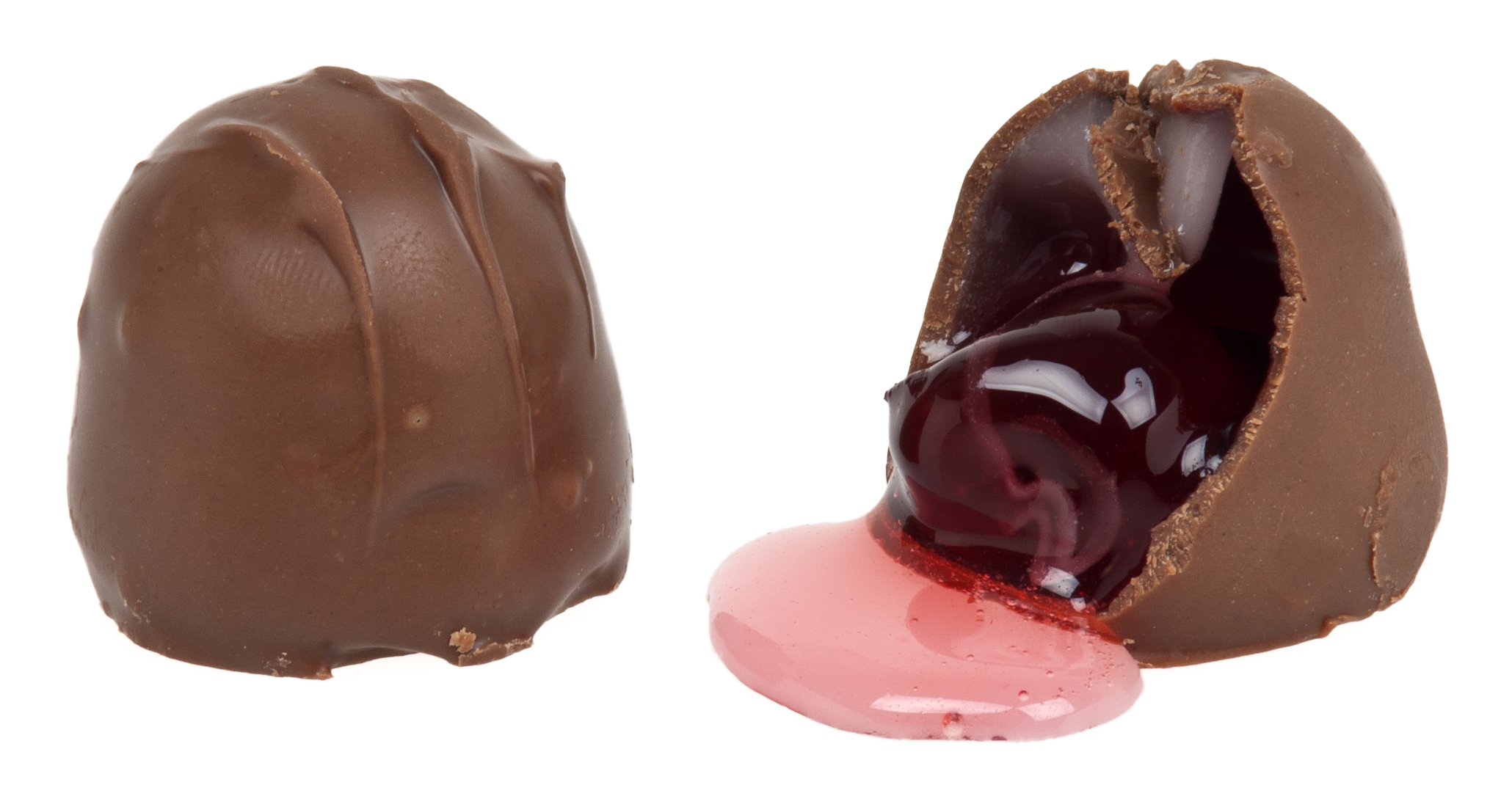
Cella chocolate-covered cherries

Cella's is a brand of cherry cordial confection marketed by Chicago-based Tootsie Roll Industries, who purchased the brand in 1985. They were originally introduced in 1864.

== Description ==
Cella's is a brand of cherry cordial confection. The cordials are cherries and liquid enrobed in either milk chocolate or dark chocolate.

== History ==
Cella's cherry cordial was introduced in 1864, with large-scale production starting in 1929. The brand was purchased by Chicago-based Tootsie Roll Industries in 1985.

== See also ==
- List of confectionery brands
