= Chocolate-coated peanut =

Confectionery

- Chocolate-covered peanuts, Goobers
- Type: Confectionery
- Main ingredients: Peanuts, milk chocolate

Chocolate-coated (or chocolate-covered) peanuts are a popular bulk vending product. They consist of peanuts coated in a shell of chocolate. They have a reputation in many countries of being an item associated with the concession counter at places such as movie theaters.

In some countries, they are sold under the brand Goobers, which is the earliest and one of the most popular brands of the product, made by Nestlé. They can be found at movie theaters and grocery stores around the world. Many other brands also exist.

Vegan chocolate-coated peanuts that do not contain dairy are made of sugar (non-refined), cocoa mass, cocoa butter, and vanillin.

== History ==
Goobers were introduced in the United States in 1925 by the Blumenthal Chocolate Company. Ward Foods acquired Blumenthal in 1969. Ward Foods was acquired by Chicago-based Terson Company in 1981. Nestlé acquired the brand on January 9, 1984, from Terson Company. Goobers are currently owned by Ferrero, who obtained the Goobers in 2018 after acquiring much of Nestlé’s USA chocolate products in 2018 in a 2.8 Billion business deal.

== Etymology ==
While the brand name "Goobers" is trademarked, "goober" itself is an American English word for peanut, probably derived from the Gullah word guber (meaning "peanut"), which is in turn derived from the KiKongo word n'guba.

== See also ==
- List of peanut dishes
- List of chocolate-covered foods
