= Cordial (candy) =

Confection; liquid filling in a chocolate shell

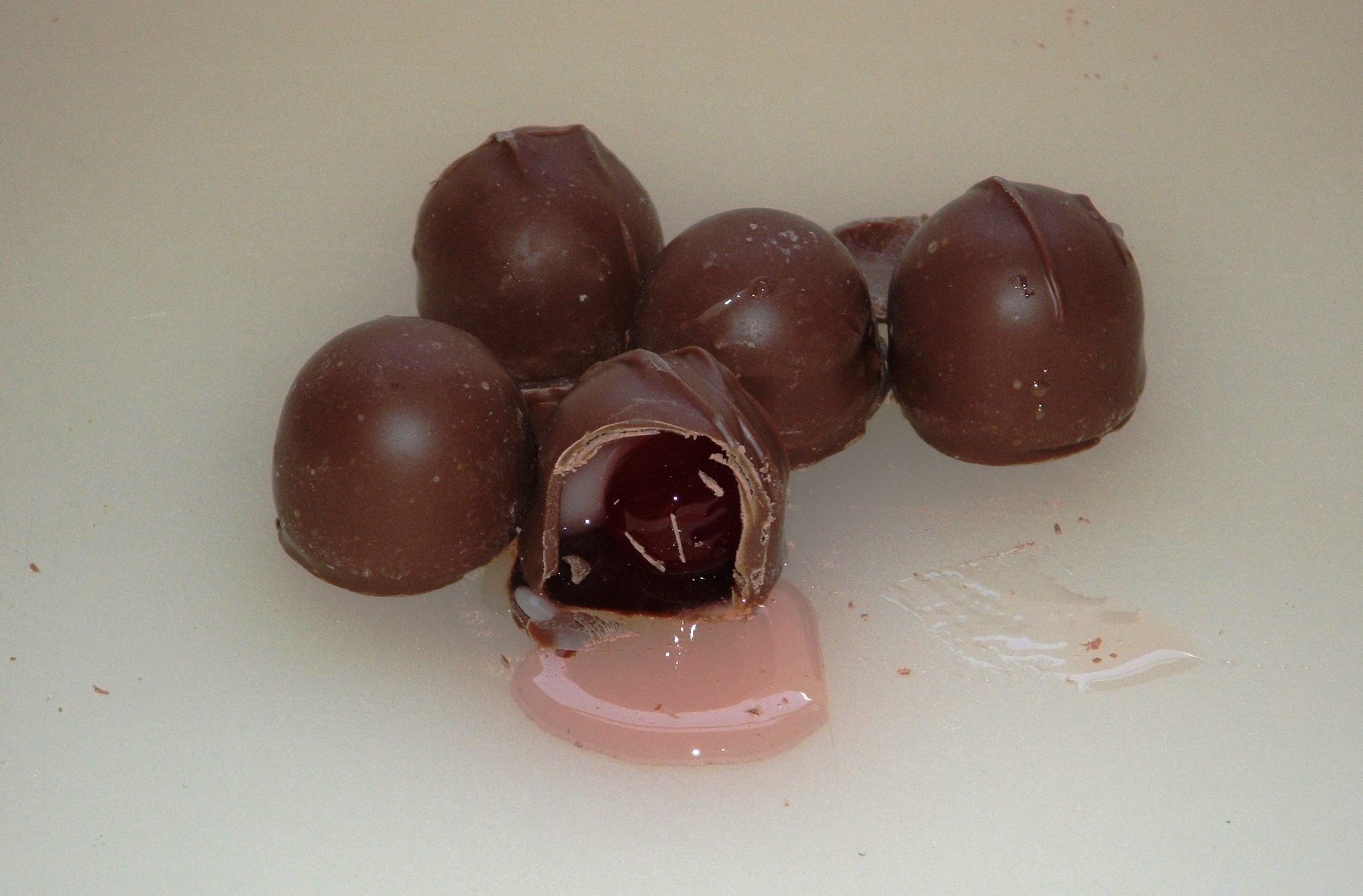
- Cherry cordial
- Type: Confectionery
- Main ingredients: Fruit, invertase, chocolate
- Food energy (per serving): 150 (calories may vary depending on brand)

A cordial is a type of confection in which liquid filling is placed within a chocolate shell. A well known confectionery of this type is the cherry cordial (a type of chocolate-covered cherry).

== History ==
In Latin, “cor” means heart, and cordial refers to a medicine tonic that stimulates the heart and circulatory system. By the 1400s in England, cordial was used to improve digestion and soothe the stomach. In the 1700s, a French confection called “griottes” started appearing. These candies were made with “long-stalked sour cherries in chocolate with a little kirsch.” The cordial and griottes cherries made their way to America, where they were combined to create the cherry cordial.

== Process ==
The liquid center found in some cordials is made using invertase to hydrolyze sucrose in the filling, a process that can take up to two weeks. This makes it a requirement to age the cordials in storage before consuming them to ensure the filling has become liquid. Some fillings include cherry, strawberry, raspberry and blueberry.

== See also ==
- List of chocolate-covered foods
