= Dominostein =

Confection from Austria and Germany

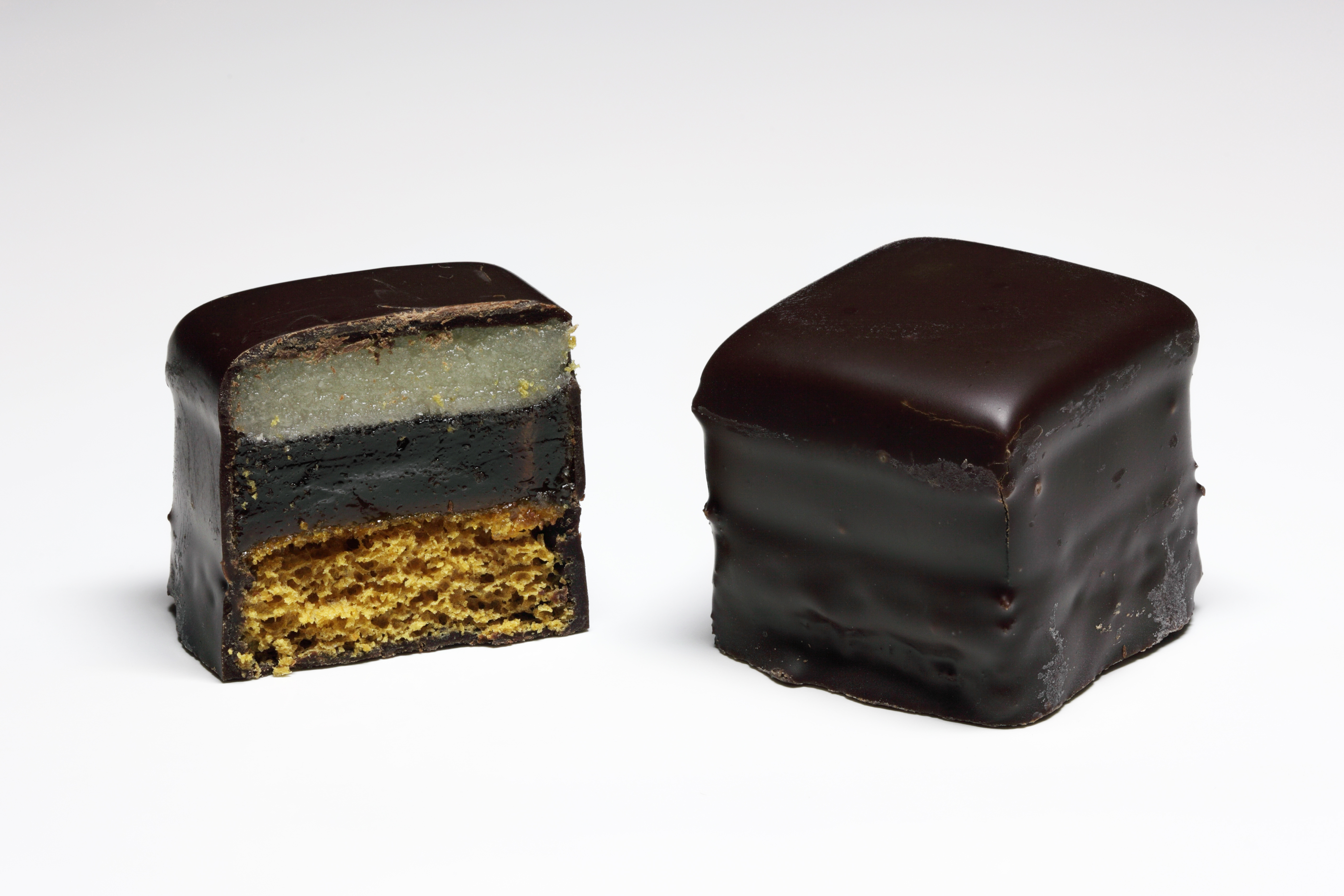
- Dominostein, fine bitter chocolate coating
- Type: Confectionery
- Place of origin: Germany
- Region or state: Saxony
- Created by: Herbert Wendler
- Main ingredients: Lebkuchen, sour cherry or apricot jelly, marzipan or persipan, milk or dark chocolate

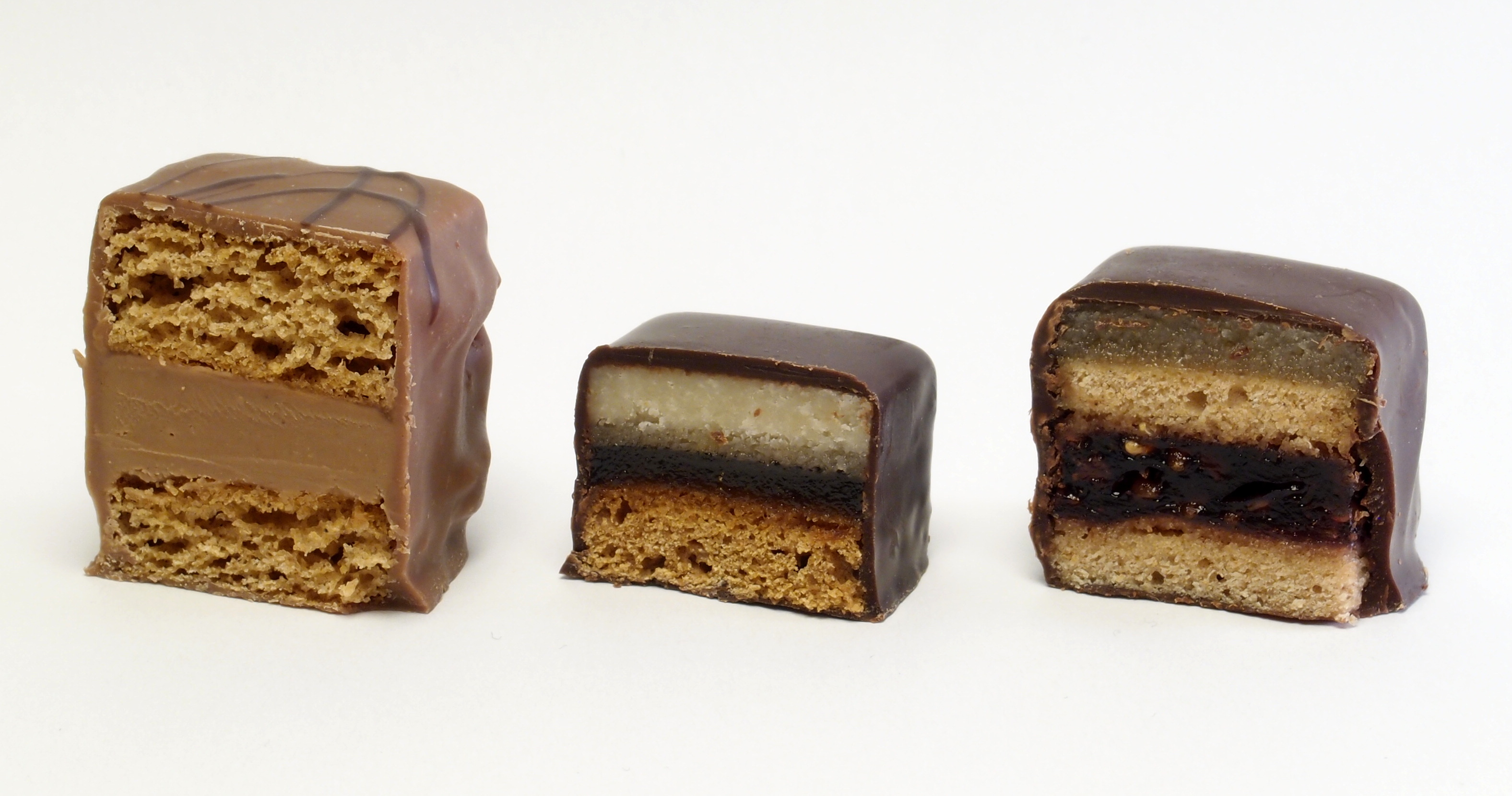
Three varieties of Dominostein

A Dominostein (meaning domino tile, plural Dominosteine) is a confection primarily sold during Christmas season in Germany and Austria.

It is a layered confection, related to the Mille-feuille, opera cake, Punschkrapfen, and Jaffa Cakes. Dominostein has a base of Lebkuchen (gingerbread), a middle layer of jelly (e.g. from sour cherries or apricots), and a top layer of marzipan or persipan. It is enveloped in (typically) dark chocolate.

== History ==
The Dominostein was invented in 1936 by Herbert Wendler (1912–1998) in Dresden. Because of the food shortage during World War II, he intended it as a lower-priced alternative to his more expensive pralines. It became popular as a Notpraline (hardship praline or emergency praline). Wendler's original recipe used Pulsnitzer Pfefferkuchen (gingerbread from Pulsnitz).

Wendler's factory was destroyed in World War II and rebuilt in 1952. In 1972, his company was nationalized during communist rule in East Germany. The government returned the company to Wendler in 1990 during German reunification. In 1996 Dresden-based Dr. Quendt GmbH & Co. KG acquired his company and original Dominostein recipe. By then the confection had become popular nationwide, especially during Christmas.

== Retail sales ==
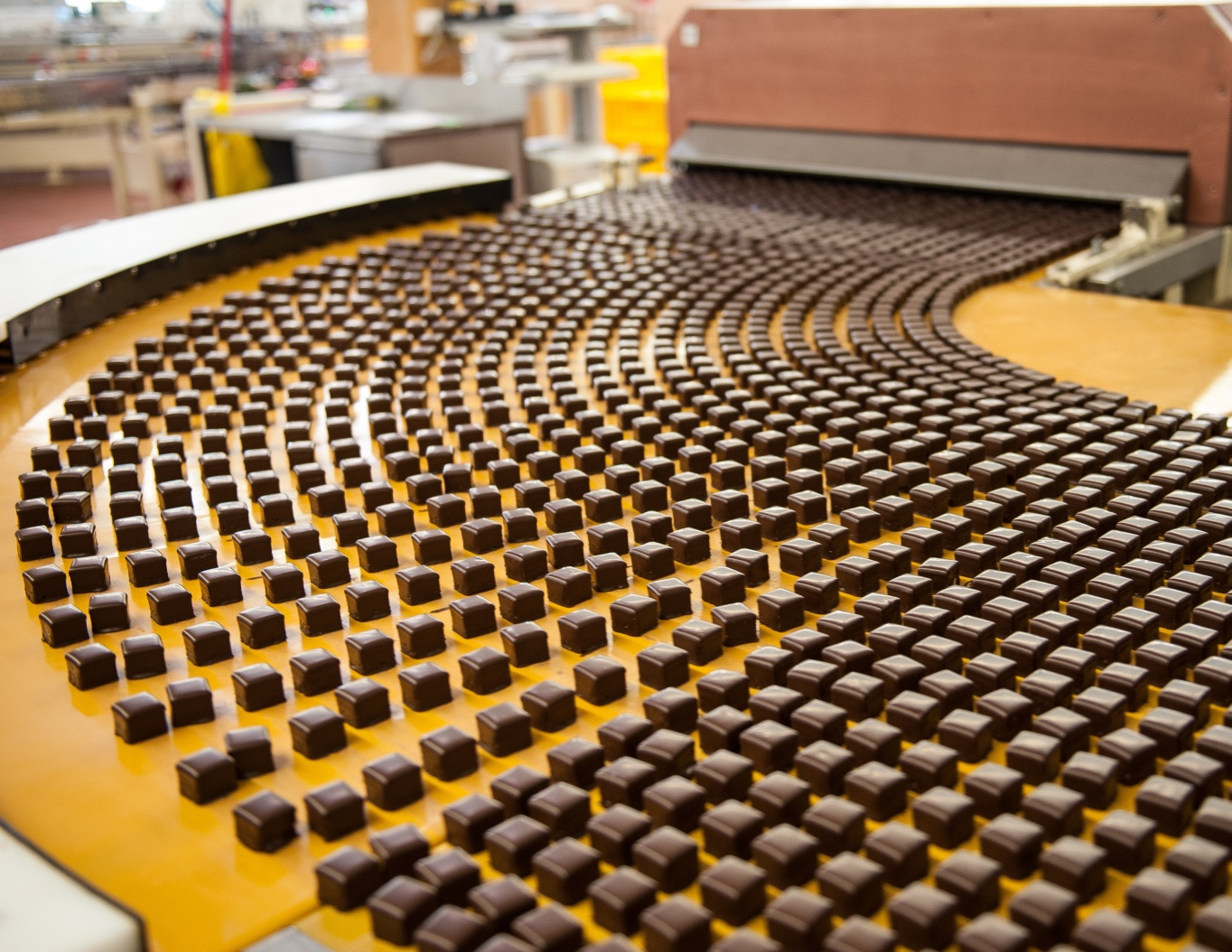
Mass production in a Lambertz factory

Dr. Quendt still manufactures and sells Wendler's original Dominostein. Other German manufacturers and distributors include Edeka, Favorina, Lambertz, and Niederegger. Small confectioneries in Germany also make and sell Dominosteine, including variations with strawberry jelly and nougat. In the United States, Aldi markets them as "chocolate dominoes" under its Benton's brand.

== See also ==
- List of German desserts
