= Persipan =

Confectionery ingredient

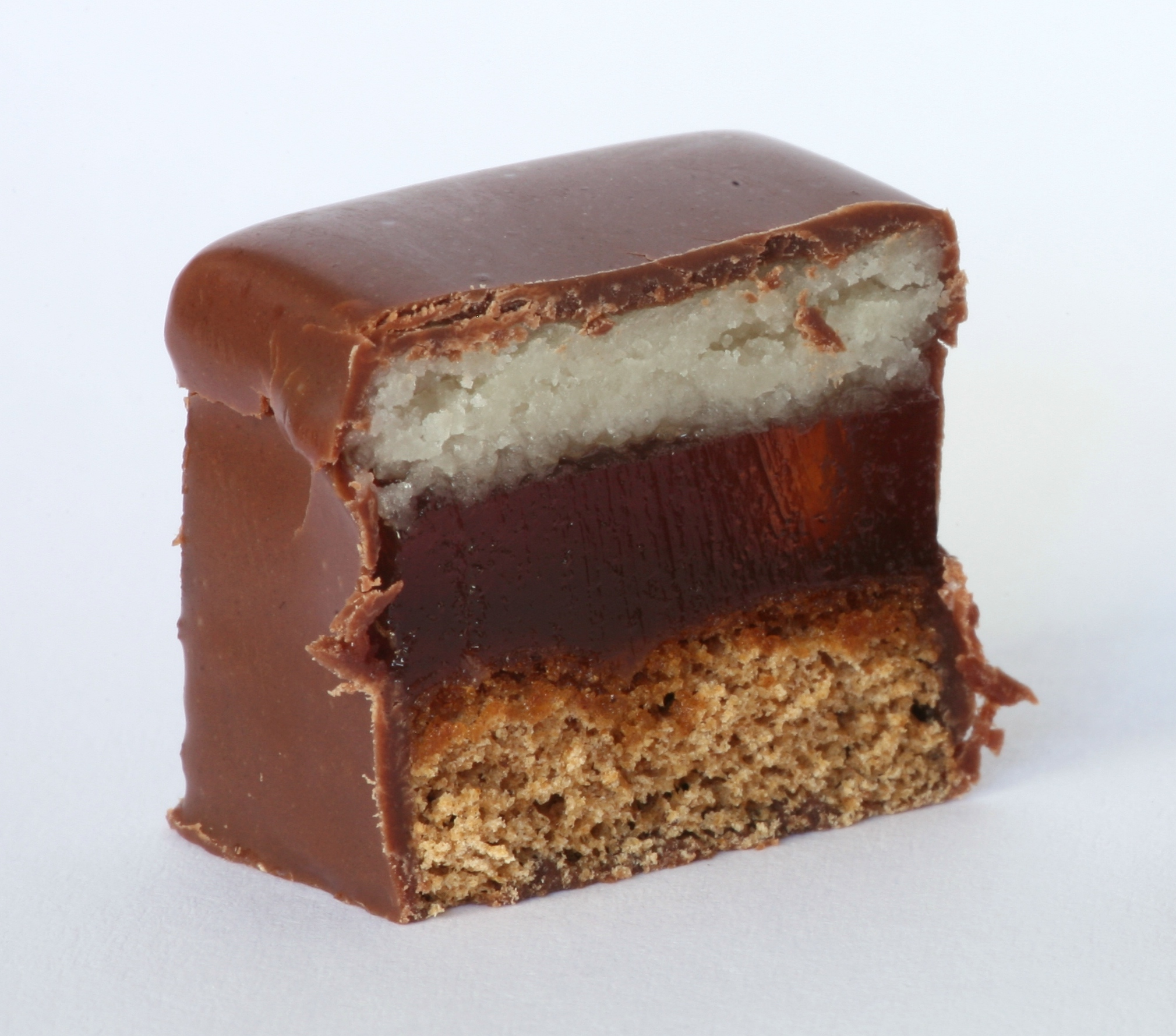
- This Dominostein has a layer of persipan at the top
- Alternative names: Parzipan
- Place of origin: Germany
- Main ingredients: Apricot or peach kernels, sugar

Persipan (from Persicus (peach) and marzipan; also known as Parzipan) is a material used in confectionery. It is similar to marzipan but, instead of almonds, is made with apricot or peach kernels. Persipan consists of 40% ground kernels and 60% sugar. The kernels have a strong bitter flavour caused by the presence of amygdalin, a toxic cyanogenic glycoside which has to be detoxified before the kernels can be used. The cores are normally not used otherwise, originally making persipan lower-priced than marzipan. It also has a somewhat different taste. Persipan often contains 0.5% starch so that it can be easily differentiated from marzipan with an iodine test.

Persipan is generally used in confectionery in place of marzipan and as an ingredient of pastry and sweet foods, such as Stollen. It is rarely eaten by itself. In recent years, the use of persipan has increased.
