= Punschkrapfen =

Austrian sponge cake

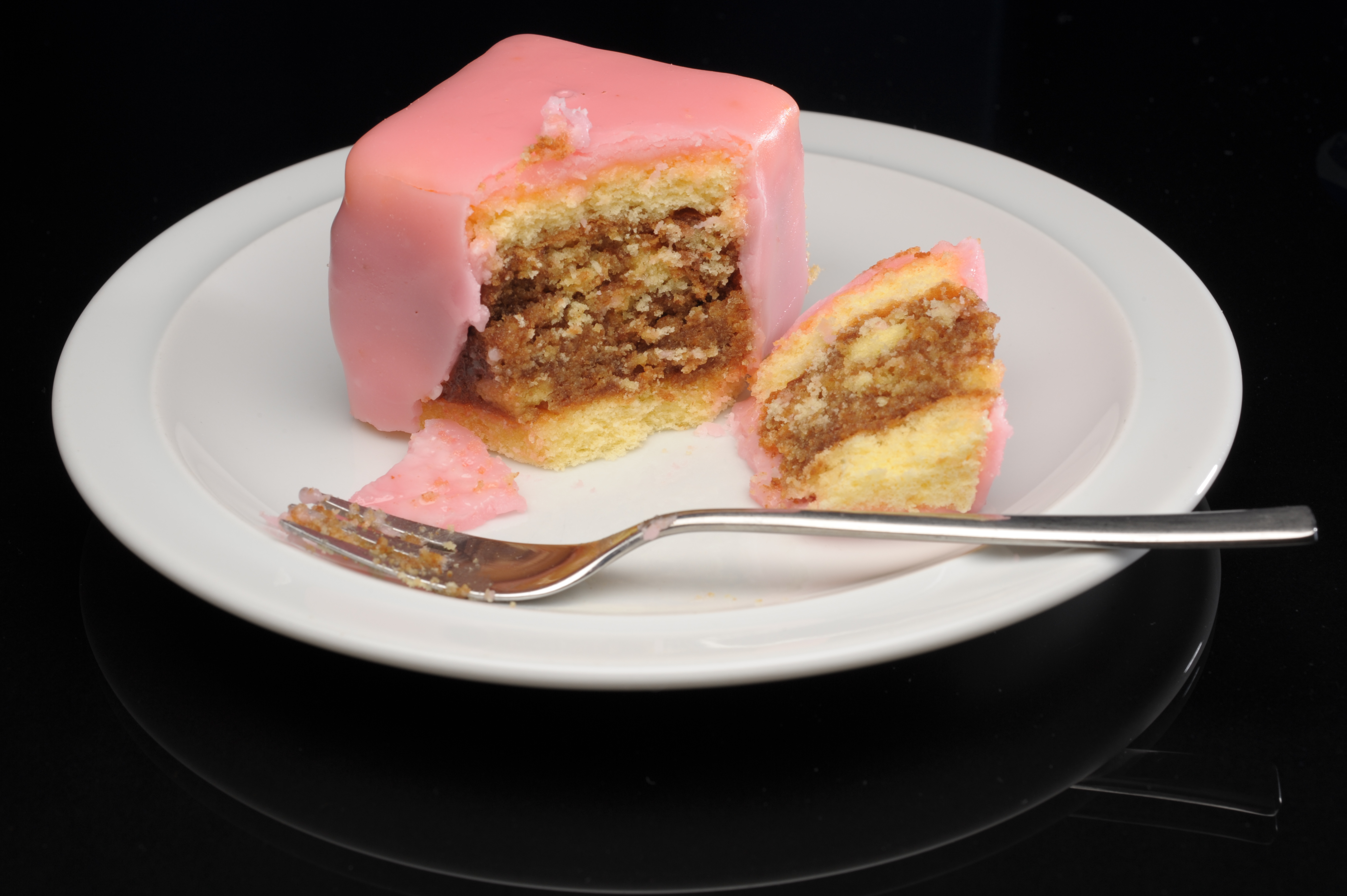
- Alternative names: Punschkrapferl
- Type: Sponge cake
- Place of origin: Austria
- Main ingredients: Cake crumbs, nougat chocolate, apricot jam, rum

Punschkrapfen or Punschkrapferl (punch cake) is a nougat and jam filled sponge cake soaked with rum originating from Austrian cuisine. Apart from the filling, it is similar to the French petit fours.

Today, one can find Punschkrapfen in most pastry shops and bakeries in Austria, Hungary, Slovakia and the Czech Republic.

== Composition ==
It is a cake consisting of either sponge cake or cake crumbs, nougat chocolate and apricot jam. The cake layers are soaked with rum. The cake is cut into 4 cm (1 1/2 inch) cubes, covered with so-called Punschglasur (punch icing), a thick pink rum sugar glazing often drizzled with chocolate and a cocktail cherry on top. Nowadays, there are also Punschkrapfen in cylindrical form.

== History ==
The origin of Punschkrapfen is disputed. It may have been introduced to Vienna in the Middle Ages by the Avars, or the Ottoman armies brought the Punschkrapfen to Vienna (the Second Turkish Siege), or it may have been invented by an imperial court confectioner.

== Trivia ==
The Punschkrapfen is widely used in political humour; along the lines of: "What is pink (or red) on the outside, brown on the inside, and a bit tipsy?" — with answer according to political taste.

Robert Menasse suggested satirically that the Punschkrapfen should become the Austrian national symbol.

== See also ==
- Petit four
- French Fancy
- Buchteln
