= Confectionery =

Art of making confections or sweet foods

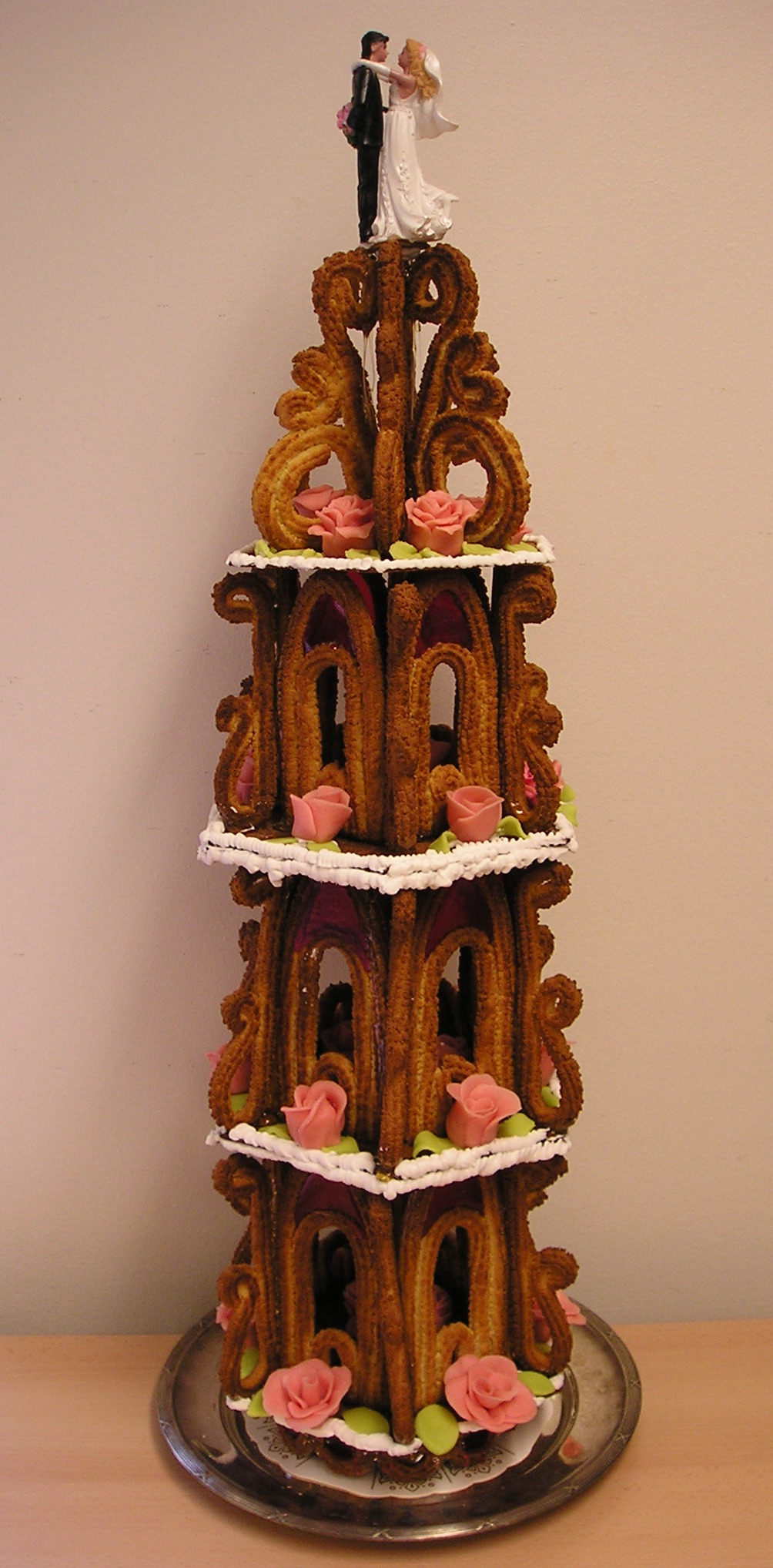
Krokan is a traditional Swedish baker's confection.

Confectionery is the art of making confections, or sweet foods. Confections are items that are rich in sugar and carbohydrates, although exact definitions are difficult. In general, however, confections are divided into two broad and somewhat overlapping categories: baker's confections and sugar confections.

Baker's confectionery, also called flour confections, includes principally sweet pastries, cakes, and similar baked goods. Baker's confectionery excludes everyday breads, and thus is a subset of products produced by a baker.

Sugar confectionery (known as candy making in the US) includes candies (also called sweets, short for sweetmeats, in many English-speaking countries), candied nuts, chocolates, chewing gum, bubble gum, pastillage, and other confections that are made primarily of sugar. In some cases, chocolate confections (confections made of chocolate) are treated as a separate category, as are sugar-free versions of sugar confections. The words candy (Canada and US), sweets (UK, Ireland, and others), and lollies (Australia and New Zealand) are common words for some of the most popular varieties of sugar confectionery.

The occupation of confectioner encompasses the categories of cooking performed by both the French patissier (pastry chef) and the confiseur (sugar worker). The confectionery industry also includes specialized training schools and extensive historical records. Traditional confectionery goes back to ancient times and continued to be eaten through the Middle Ages and into the modern era.

== Etymology ==
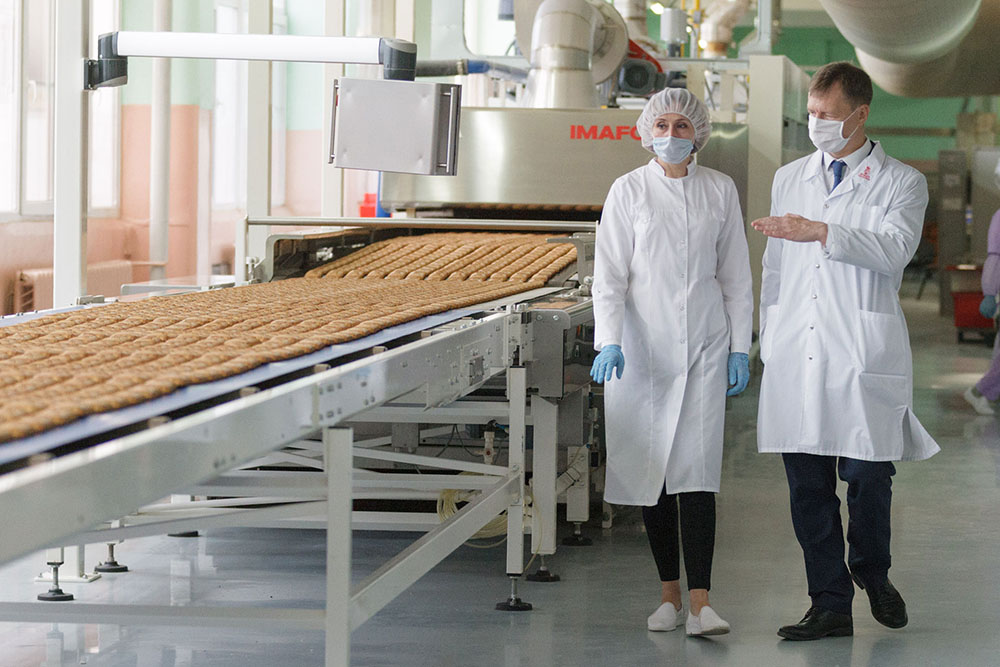
Confectionery can be mass-produced in a factory.

The oldest recorded use of the word confectionery discovered so far by the Oxford English Dictionary is by Richard Jonas in 1540, who spelled or misspelled it as "confection nere" in a passage "Ambre, muske, frankencense, gallia muscata and confection nere", thus in the sense of "things made or sold by a confectioner".

Also according to the OED, the sense of "the art and business of a confectioner" is first recorded in 1743, and the earliest use in the sense of a "confectioner's shop" dates to 1803.

== History ==
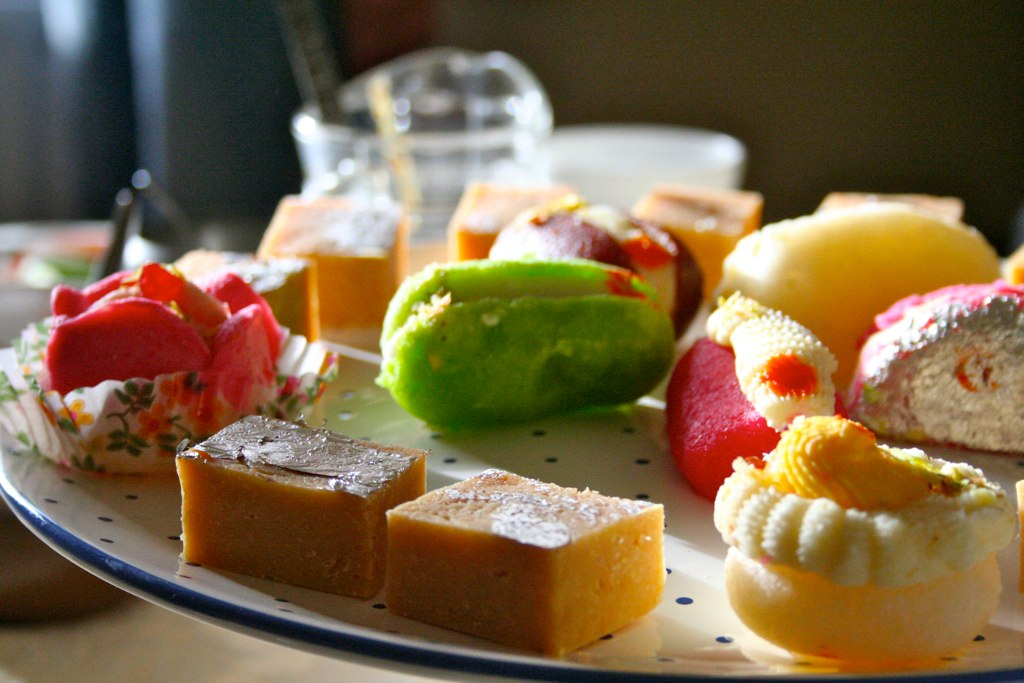
Some Indian confectionery desserts from hundreds of varieties. In certain parts of India, these are called mithai or sweets. Sugar and desserts have a long history in India: by about 500 BCE, people in India had developed the technology to produce sugar crystals. In the local language, these crystals were called khanda (खण्ड), which is the source of the word candy.

Before sugar was readily available in the ancient western world, confectionery was based on honey. Honey was used in Ancient China, Ancient India, Ancient Egypt, Ancient Greece and Ancient Rome to coat fruits and flowers to preserve them or to create sweetmeats. Between the 6th and 4th centuries BCE, the Persians, followed by the Greeks, made contact with the Indian subcontinent and its "reeds that produce honey without bees". They adopted and then spread sugar and sugarcane agriculture. Sugarcane is indigenous to tropical Indian subcontinent and Southeast Asia.

In the early history of sugar usage in Europe, it was initially the apothecary who had the most important role in the production of sugar-based preparations. Medieval European physicians learned the medicinal uses of the material from the Arabs and Byzantine Greeks. One Middle Eastern remedy for rheums and fevers were little, twisted sticks of pulled sugar called in Arabic al fänäd or al pänäd. These became known in England as alphenics, or more commonly as penidia, penids, pennet or pan sugar. They were the precursors of barley sugar and modern cough drops. In 1390, the treasurer of the Earl of Derby included "penydes" in the audit of his provisions and expenses for expeditions made to Prussia and the Holy Land.

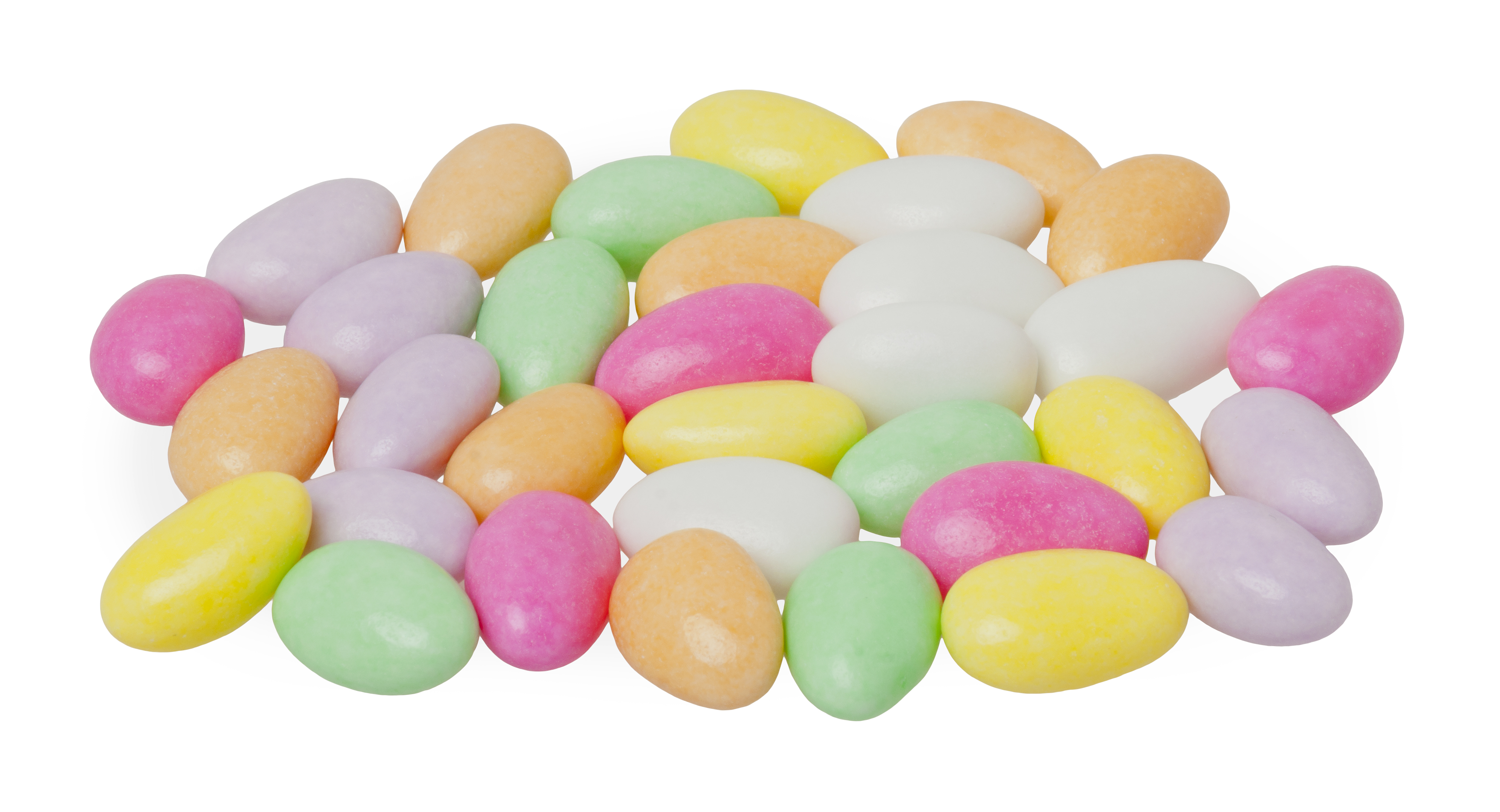
Jordan almonds. Sugar-coated nuts or spices for non-medicinal purposes marked the beginning of confectionery in late medieval England.

As the non-medicinal applications of sugar developed, the comfitmaker, or confectioner gradually came into being as a separate trade. In the late medieval period the words confyt, comfect or cumfitt were generic terms for all kinds of sweetmeats made from fruits, roots, or flowers preserved with sugar. By the 16th century, a cumfit was more specifically a seed, nut or small piece of spice enclosed in a round or ovoid mass of sugar. The production of comfits was a core skill of the early confectioner, who was known more commonly in 16th and 17th century England as a comfitmaker. Reflecting their original medicinal purpose, however, comfits were also produced by apothecaries and directions on how to make them appear in dispensatories as well as cookery texts. An early medieval Latin name for an apothecary was confectionarius, and it was in this sort of sugar work that the activities of the two trades overlapped and that the word "confectionery" originated.

In the cuisine of the Late Ottoman Empire diverse cosmopolitan cultural influences were reflected in published recipes such as European-style molded jellies flavored with cordials. In Europe, Ottoman confections (especially "lumps of delight" (Turkish delight) became very fashionable among European and British high society. An important study of Ottoman confectionery called Conditorei des Orients was published by the royal confectioner Friedrich Unger in 1838.

The first confectionery in Manchester, England was opened by Elizabeth Raffald who had worked six years in domestic service as a housekeeper.

== Sweetening agents ==
Confections are defined by the presence of sweeteners. These are usually sugars, but it is possible to buy sugar-free candies, such as sugar-free peppermints. The most common sweetener for home cooking is table sugar, which is chemically a disaccharide containing both glucose and fructose. Hydrolysis of sucrose gives a mixture called invert sugar, which is sweeter and is also a common commercial ingredient. Finally, confections, especially commercial ones, are sweetened by a variety of syrups obtained by hydrolysis of starch. These sweeteners include all types of corn syrup.

== Baker's confectionery ==
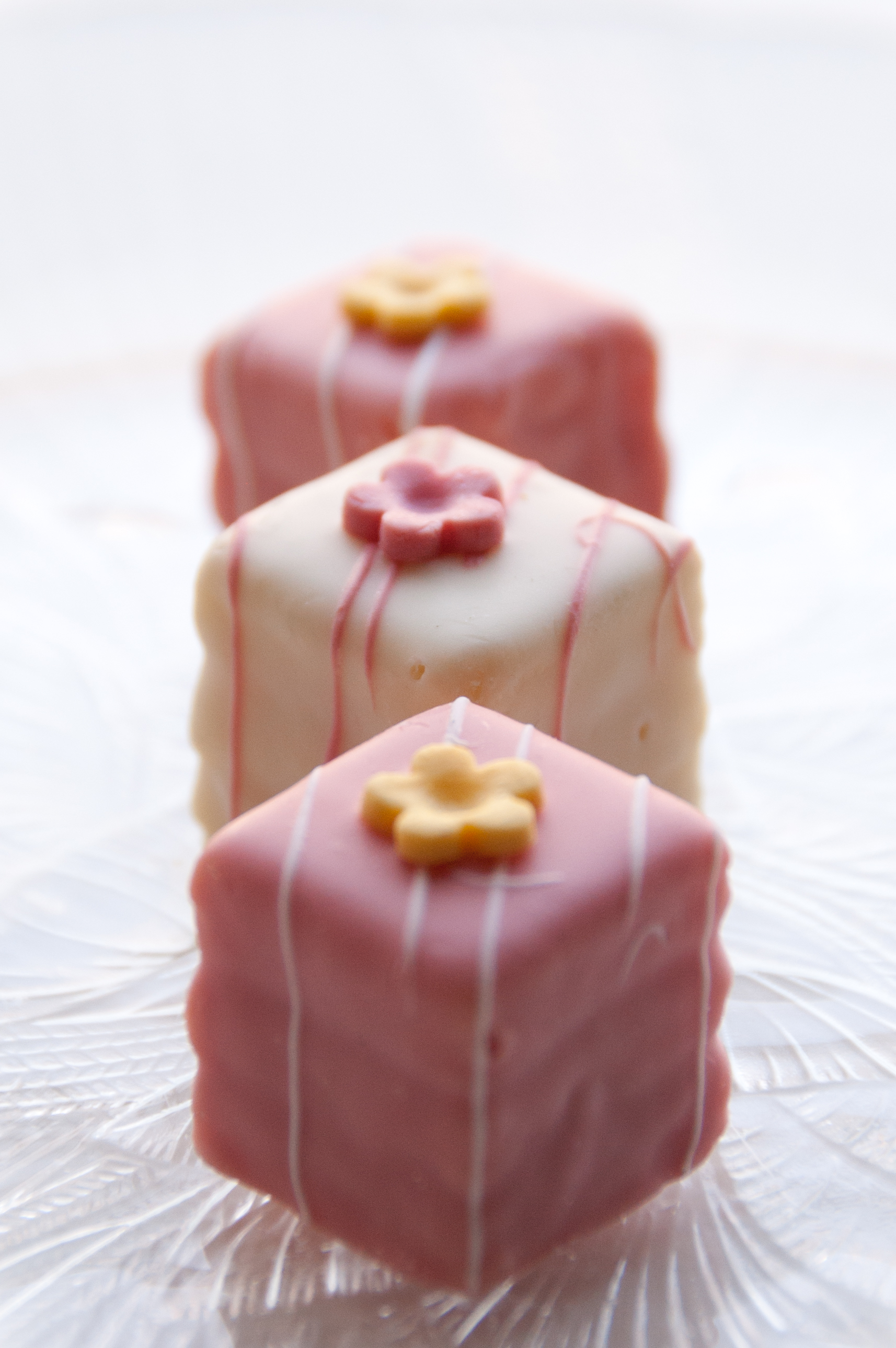
Petits fours are baker's confections.

Baker's confectionery includes sweet baked goods, especially those that are served for the dessert course. Baker's confections are sweet foods that feature flour as a main ingredient and are baked. Major categories include cakes, sweet pastries, doughnuts, scones, and cookies. In the Middle East and Asia, flour-based confections predominate.

The definition of which foods are "confectionery" vs "bread" can vary based on cultures and laws. In Ireland, the definition of "bread" as a "staple food" for tax purposes requires that the sugar or fat content be no more than 2% of the weight of the flour, so some products sold as bread in the US would be treated as confectionery there.

=== Types ===
Cakes have a somewhat bread-like texture, and many earlier cakes, such as the centuries-old stollen (fruit cake), or the even older king cake, were rich yeast breads. The variety of styles and presentations extends from simple to elaborate. Major categories include butter cakes, tortes, and foam cakes. Confusingly, some confections that have the word cake in their names, such as cheesecake, are not technically cakes, while others, such as Boston cream pie are cakes despite seeming to be named something else.

Examples of cake

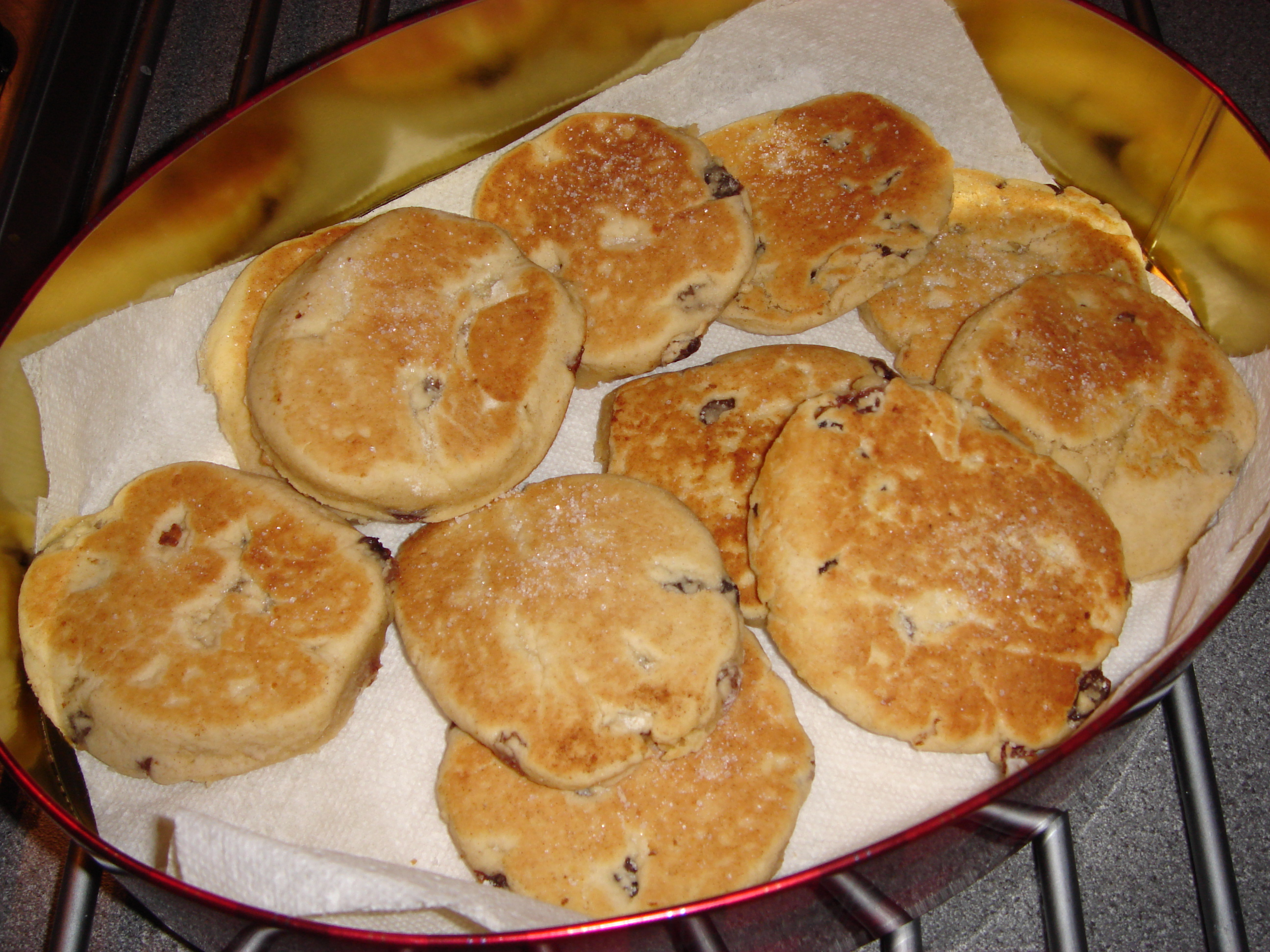
Welsh cakes are cooked on a griddle.

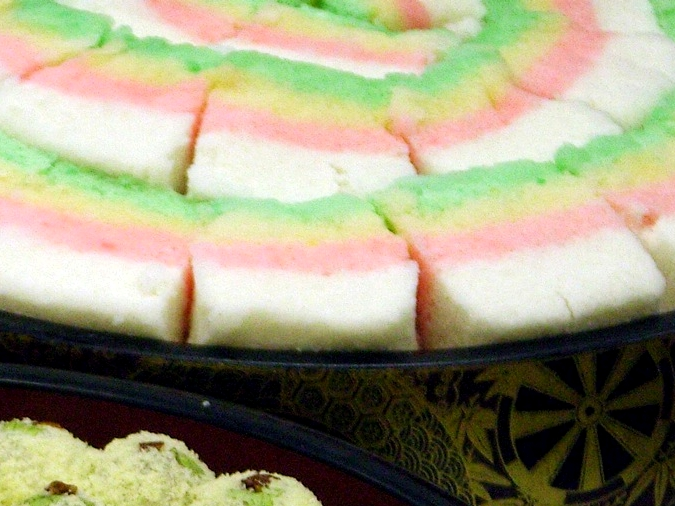
Korean rainbow rice cake is for celebrations.

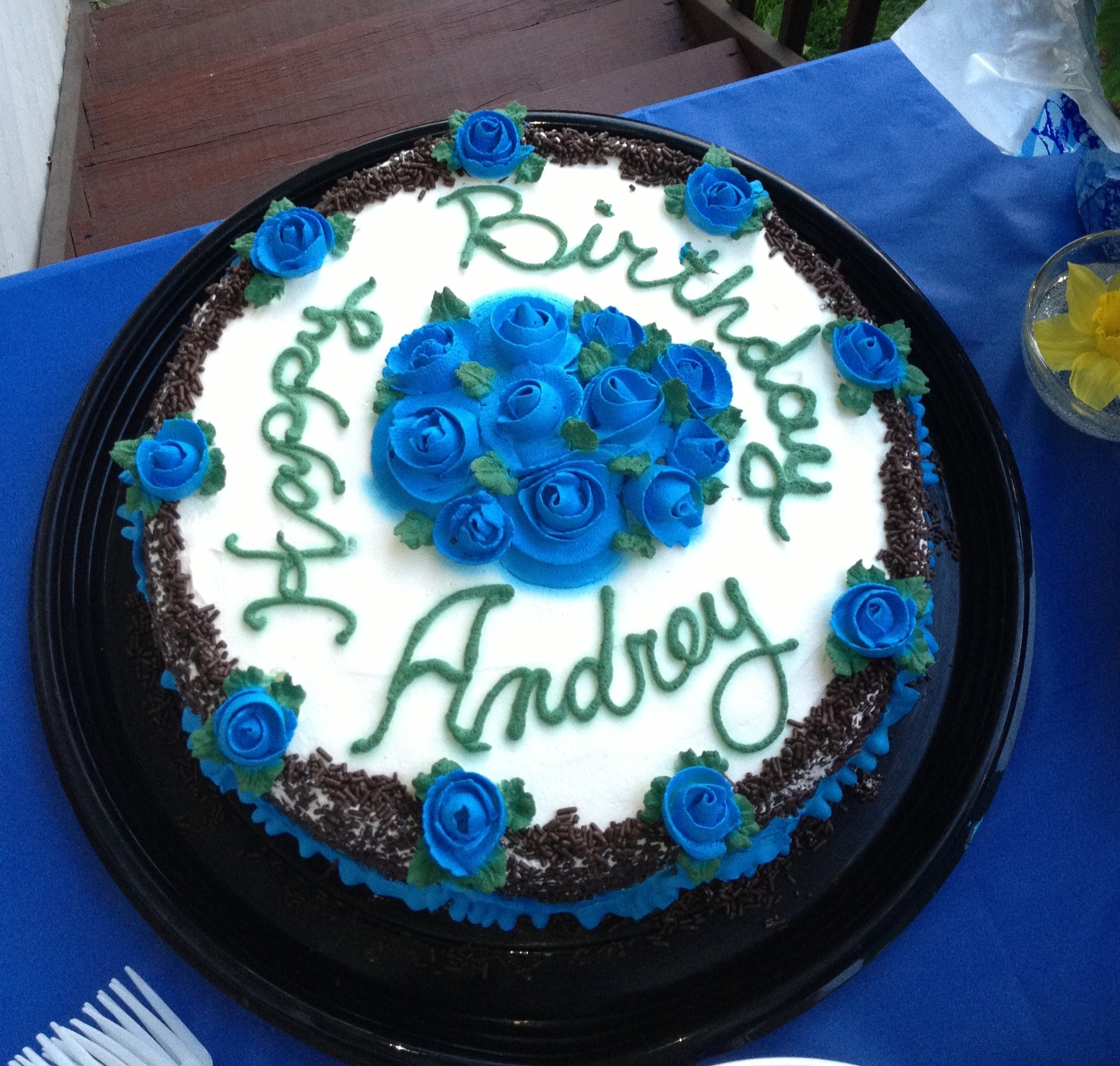
Birthday cakes may be elaborately decorated.

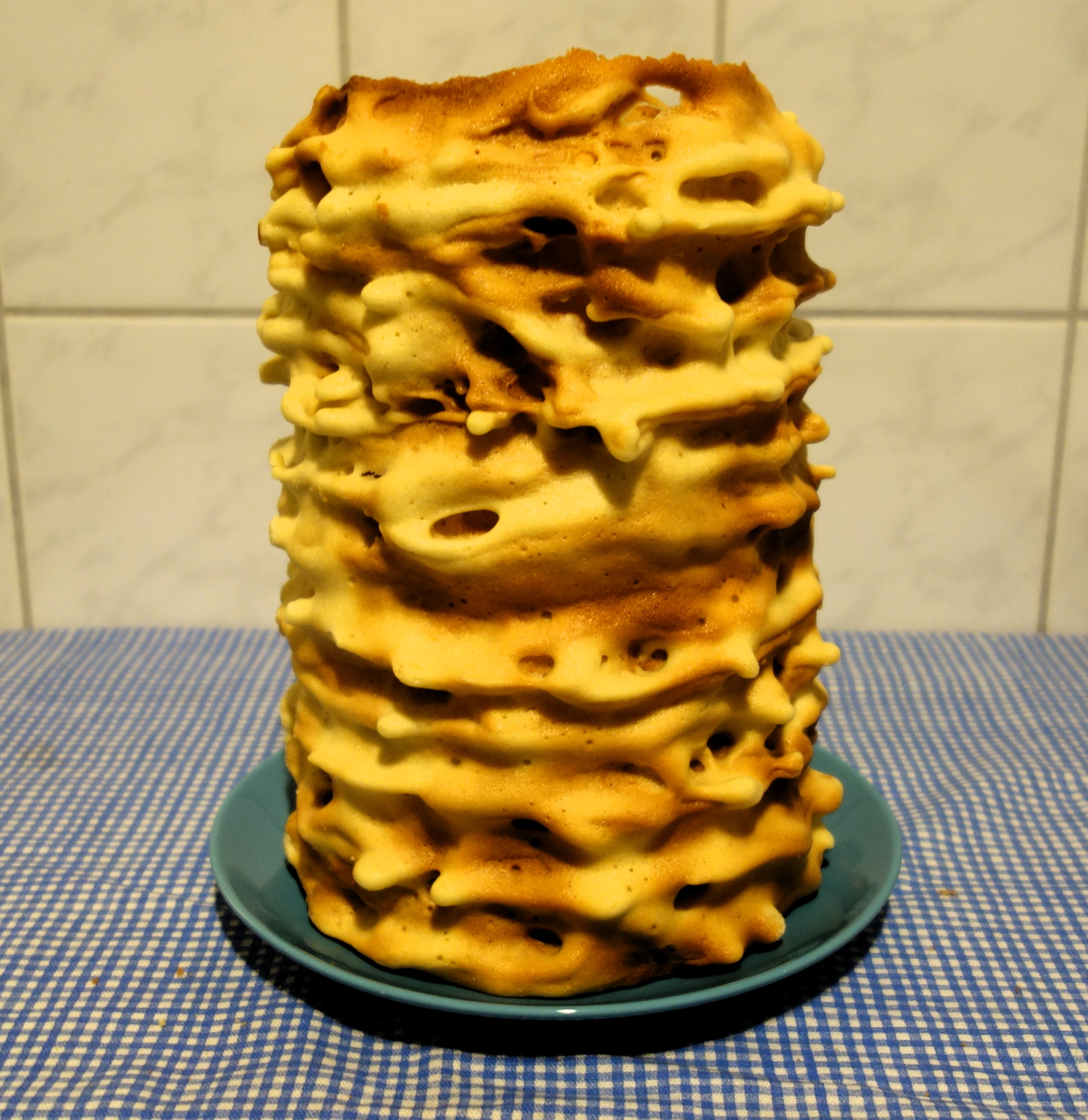
European spit cakes are baked around a metal cylinder.

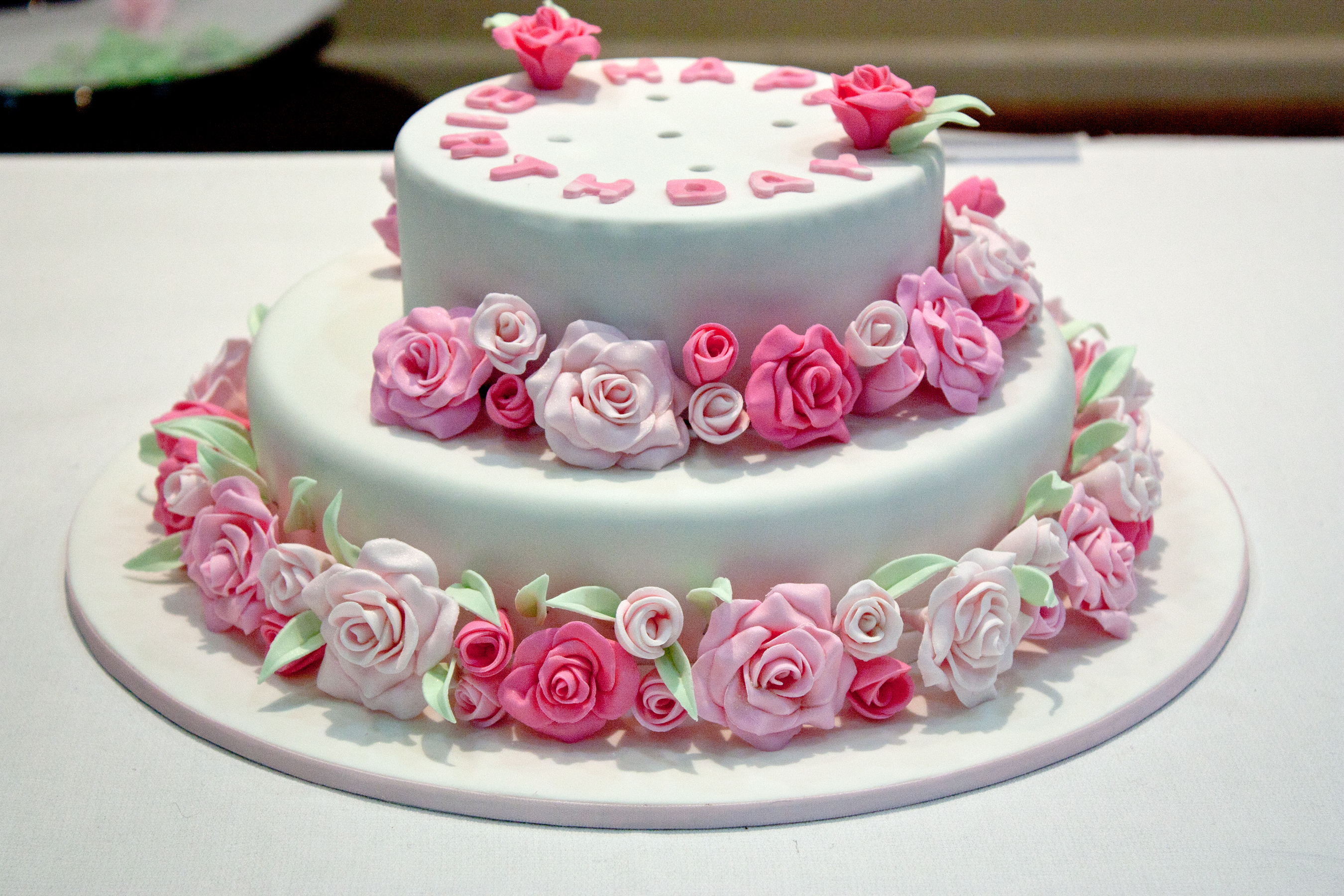
Cake with decorations made from sugar

Pastry is a large and diverse category of baked goods, united by the flour-based doughs used as the base for the product. These doughs are not always sweet, and the sweetness may come from the sugar, fruit, chocolate, cream, or other fillings that are added to the finished confection. Pastries can be elaborately decorated, or they can be plain dough.

Examples of pastry

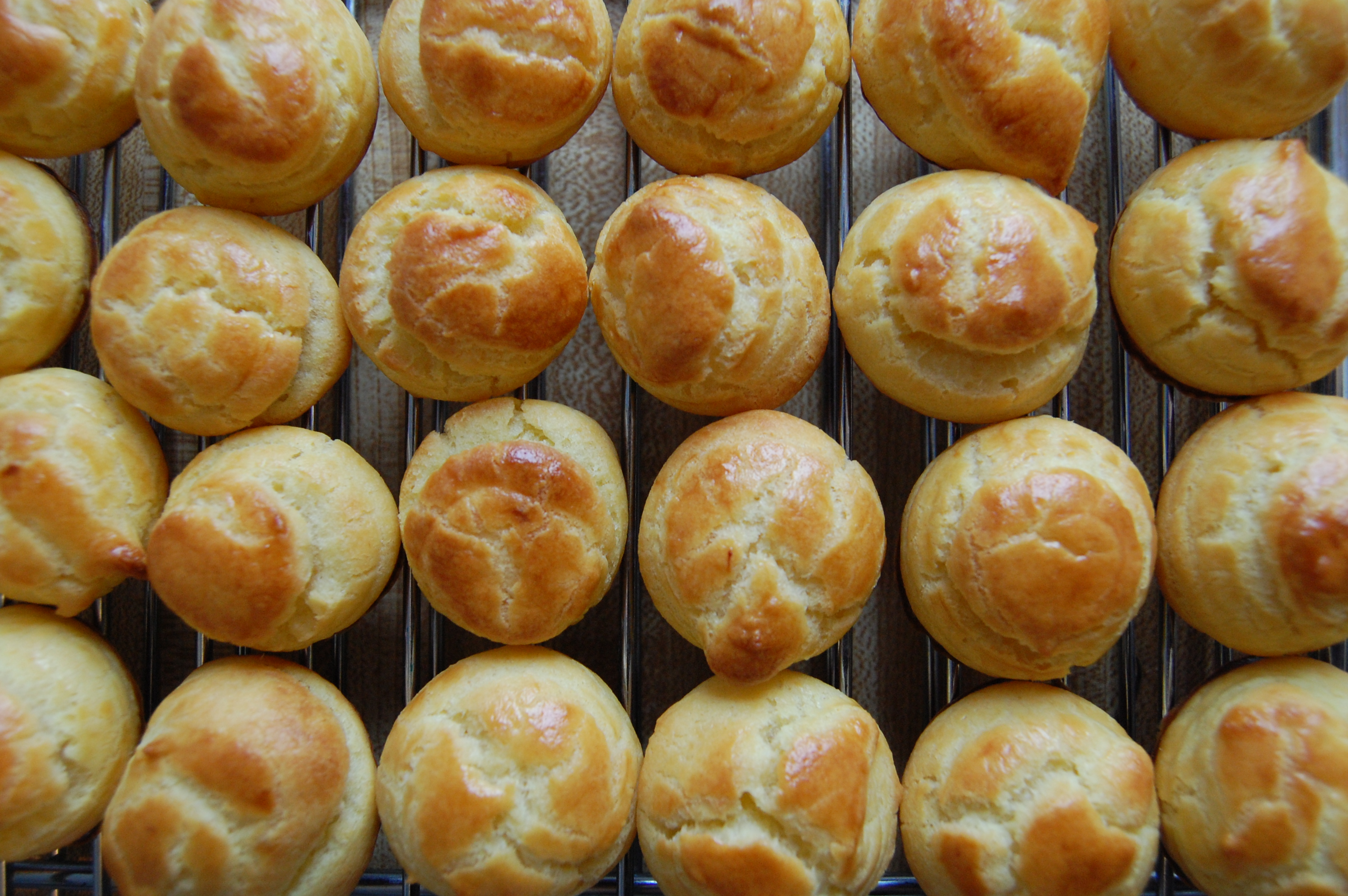
Choux pastry

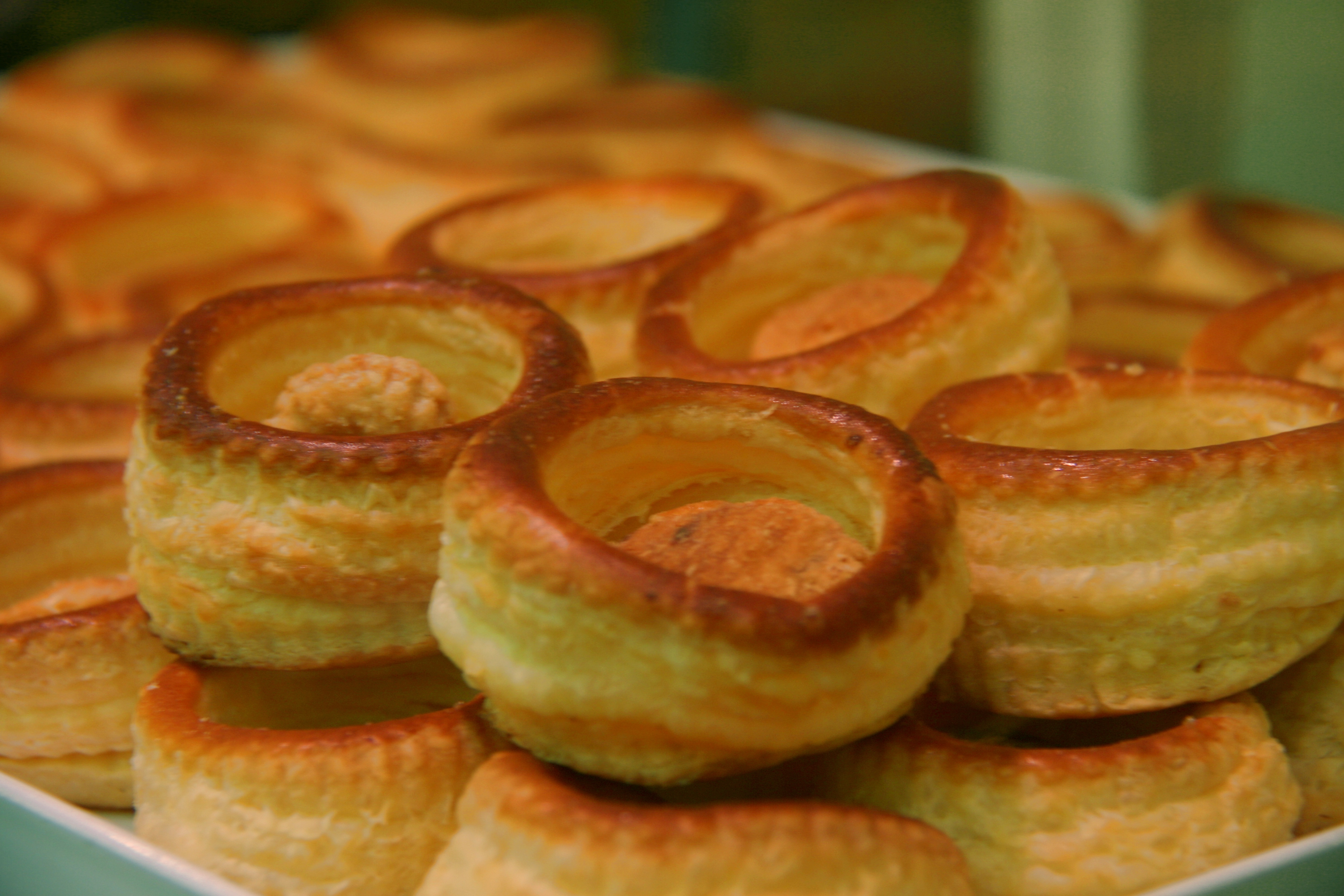
Empty shells made with puff pastry can be filled with fruit or cream.

Pie is made from a pie crust and a sweet filling.

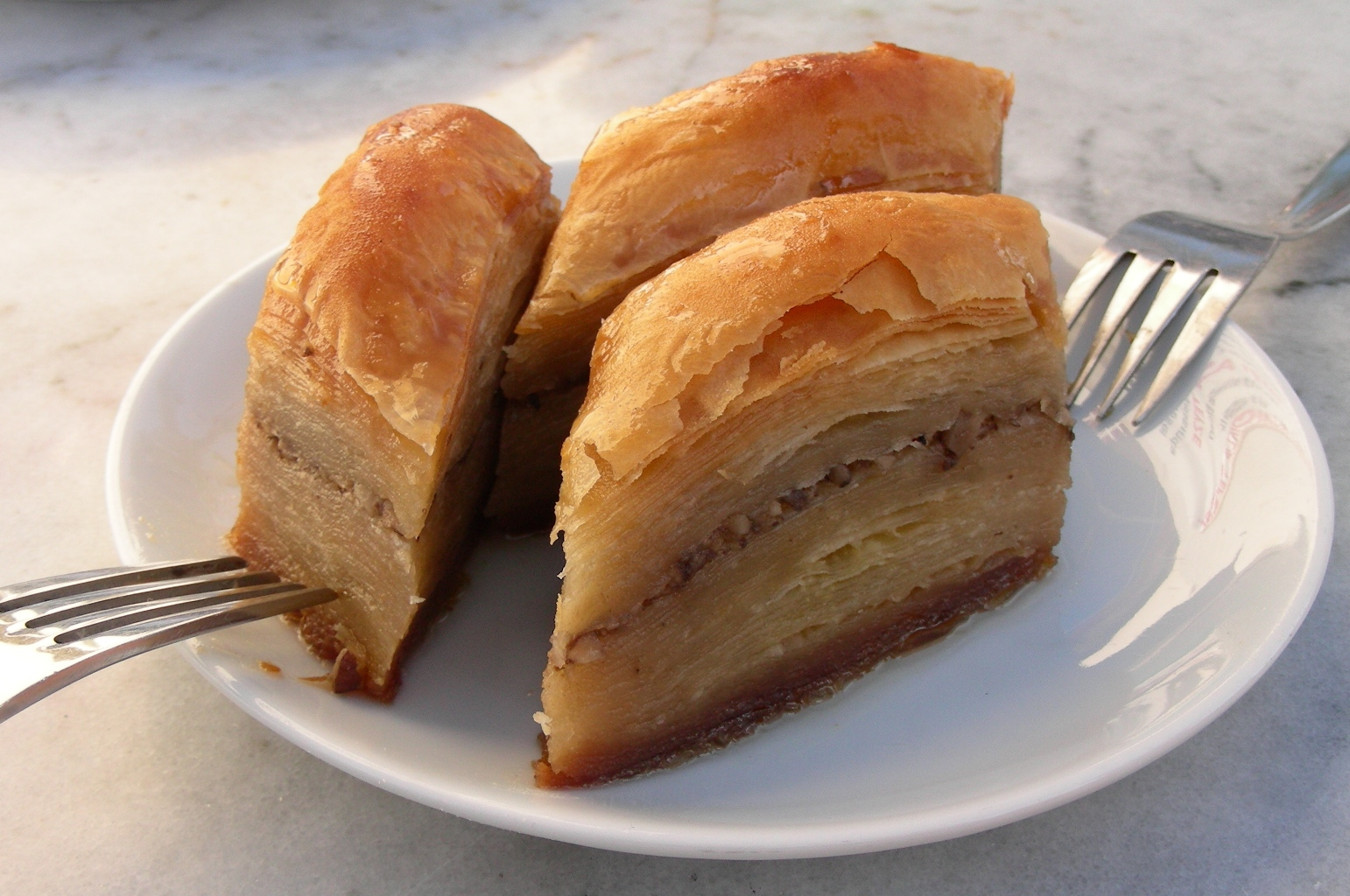
Baklava is made with phyllo pastry.

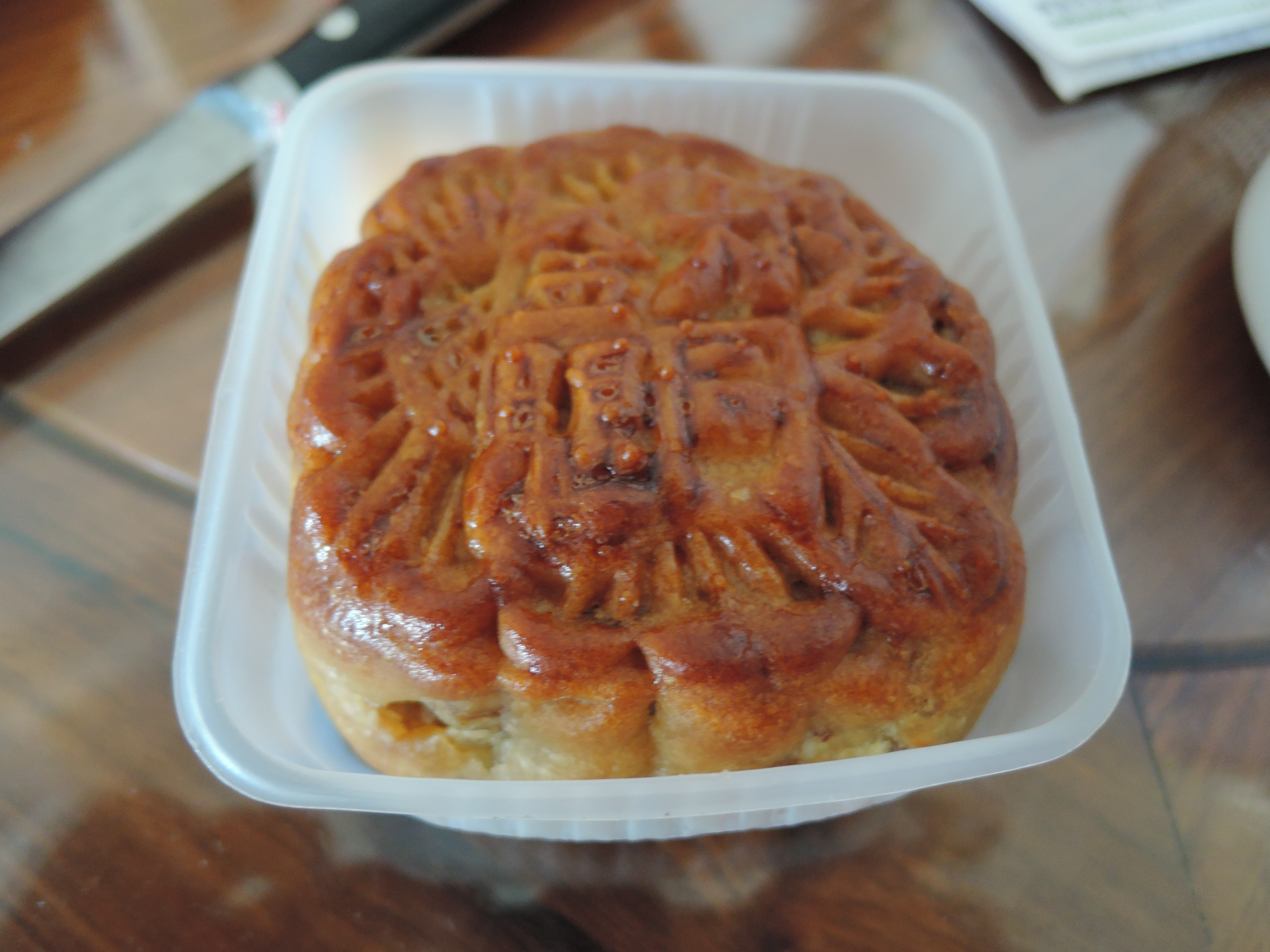
Mooncake pastries are made to celebrate the Mid-Autumn Festival in East Asia.

Doughnuts may be fried or baked.

Examples of doughnuts

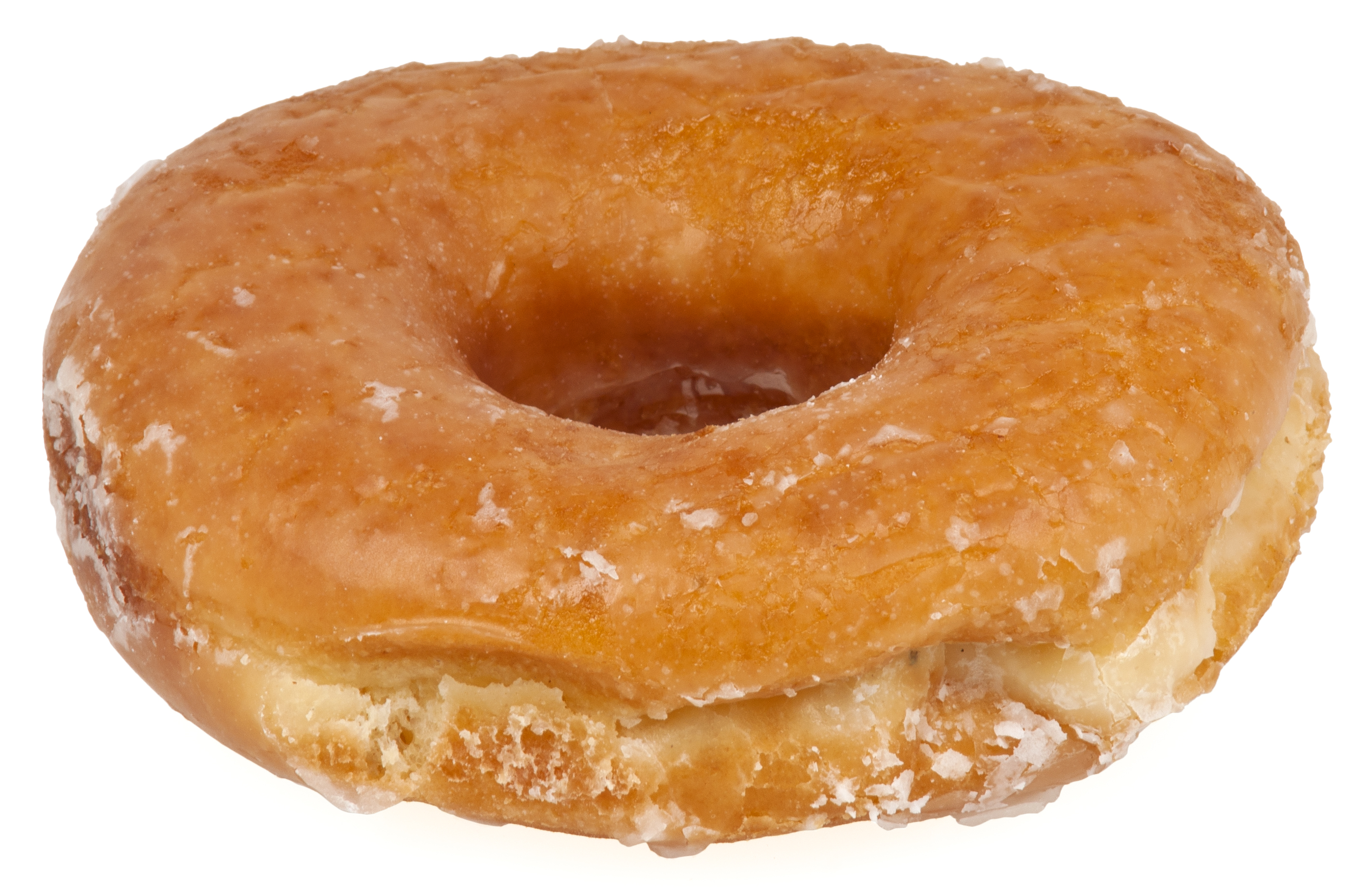
Glazed raised doughnut

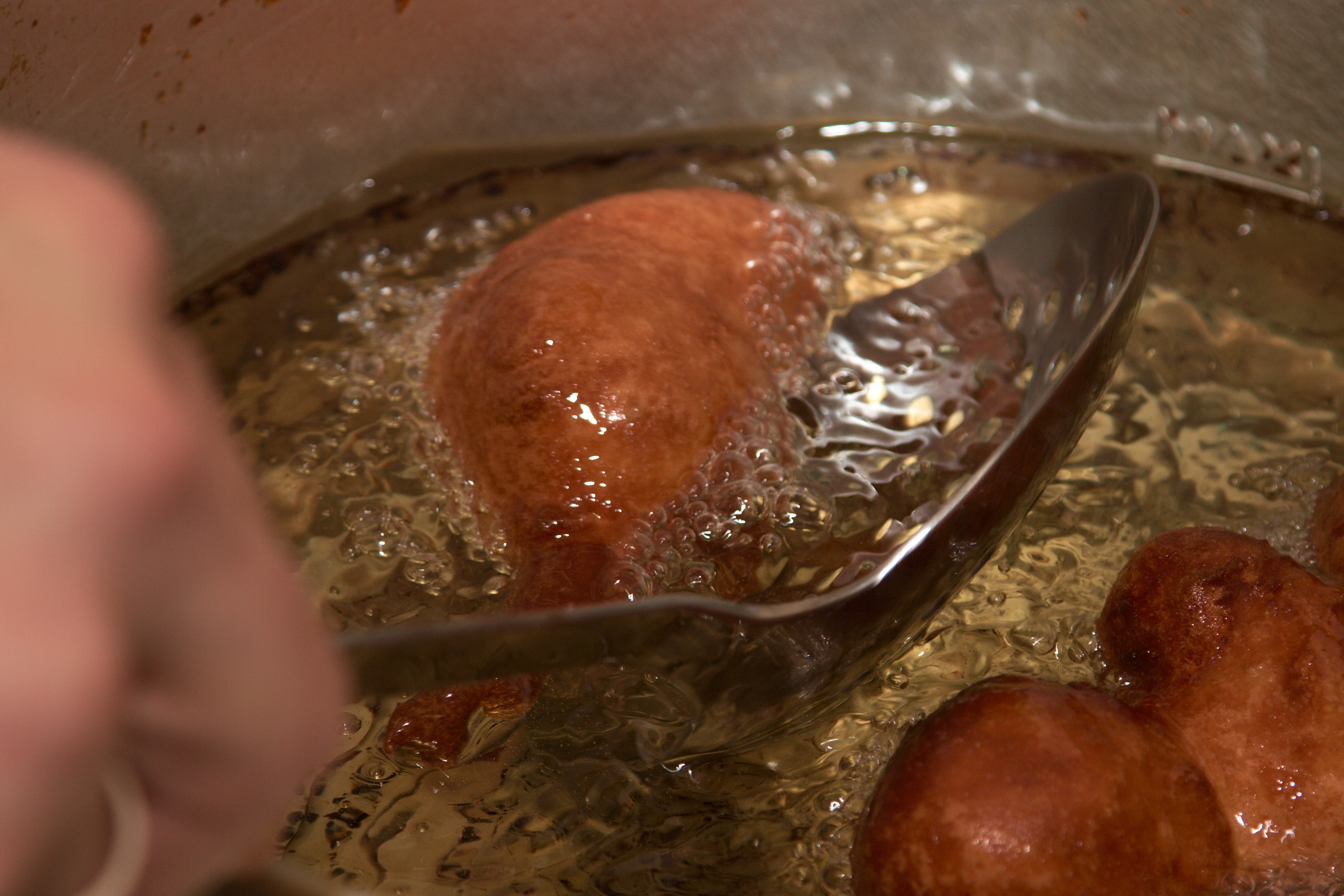
Oliebollen and similar doughnuts are fried in hot fat.

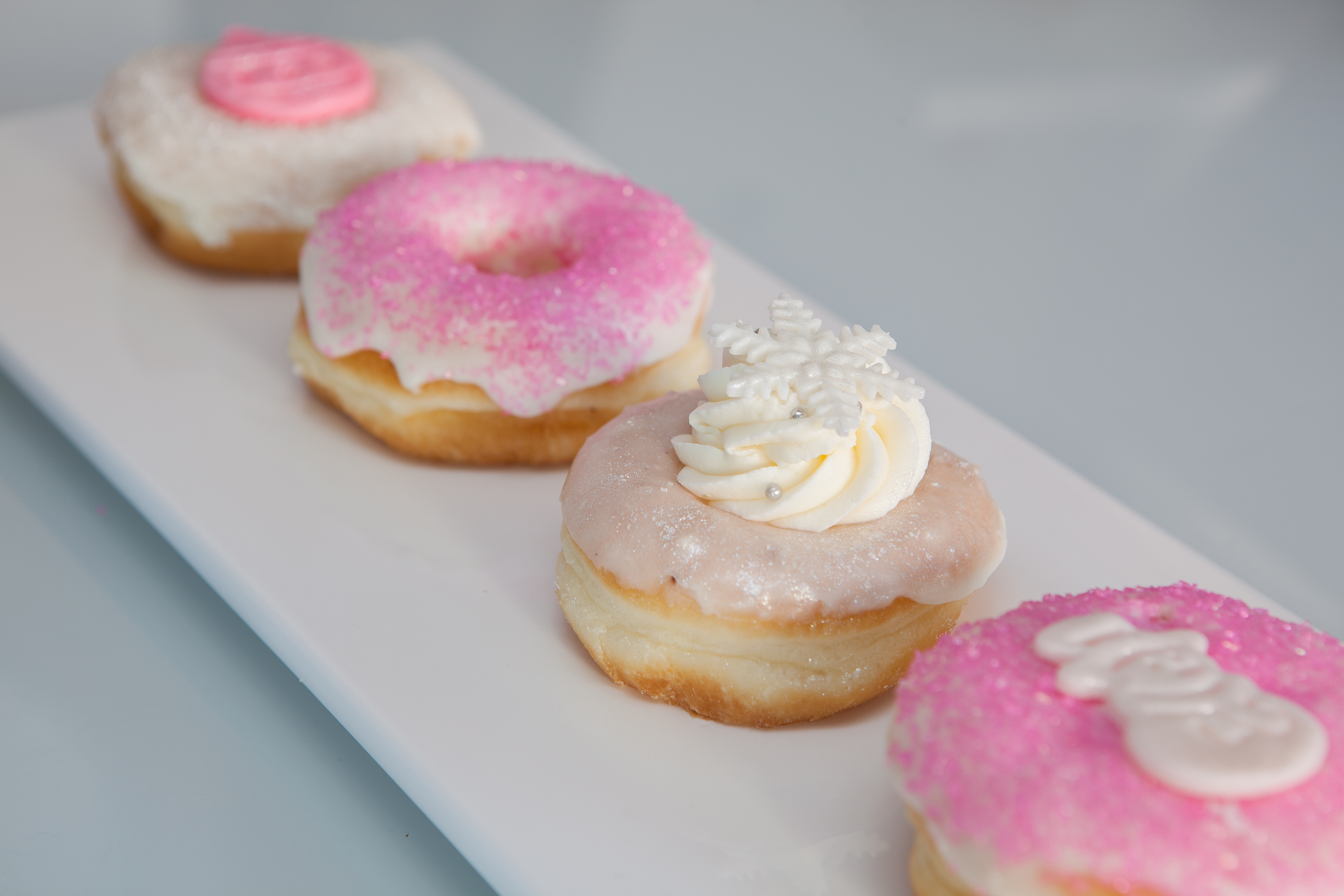
Decorated doughnuts

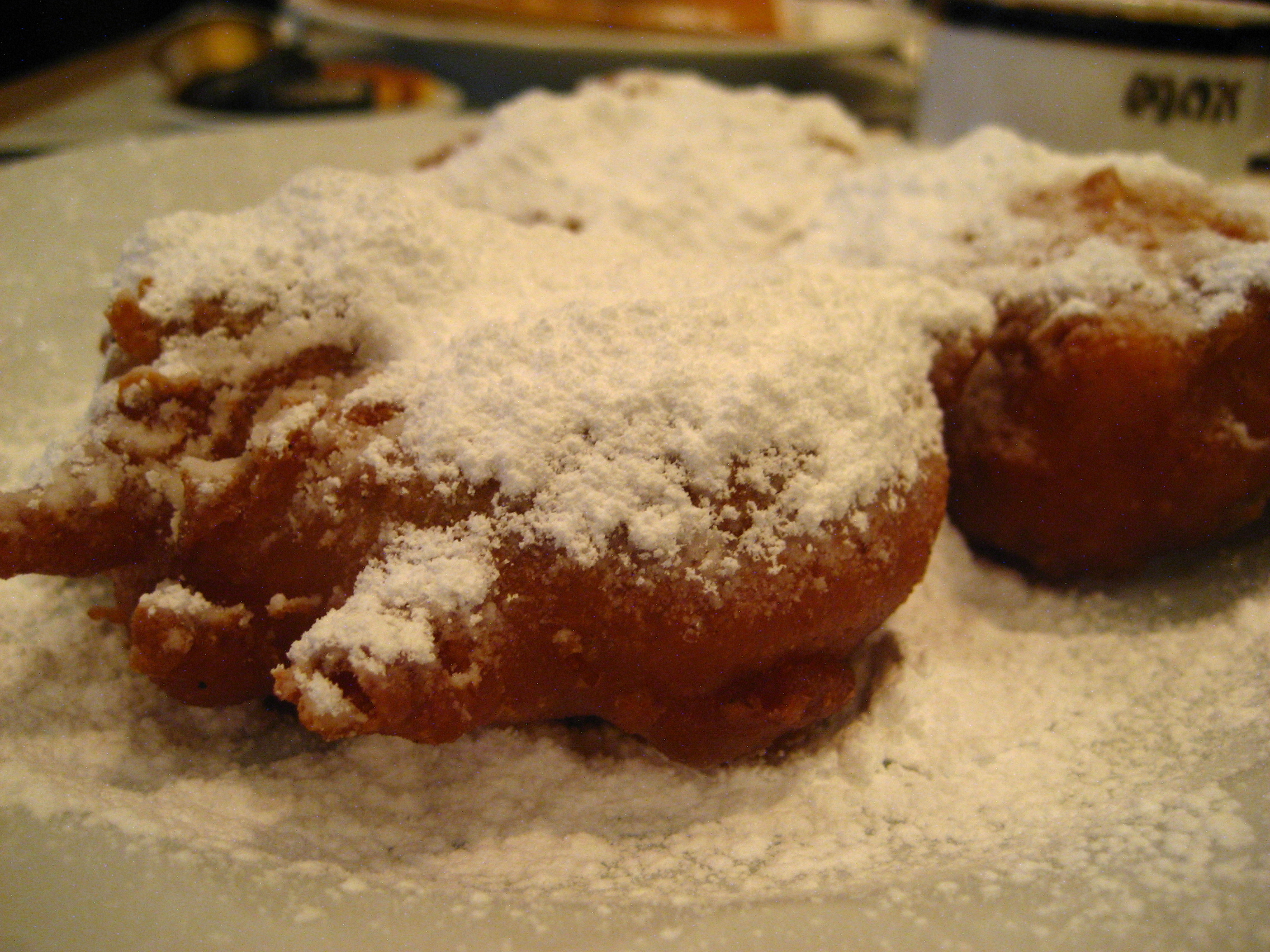
Apple fritter with powdered sugar

Scones and related sweet quick breads, such as bannock, are similar to baking powder biscuits and, in sweeter, less traditional interpretations, can seem like a cupcake.

Examples of scones

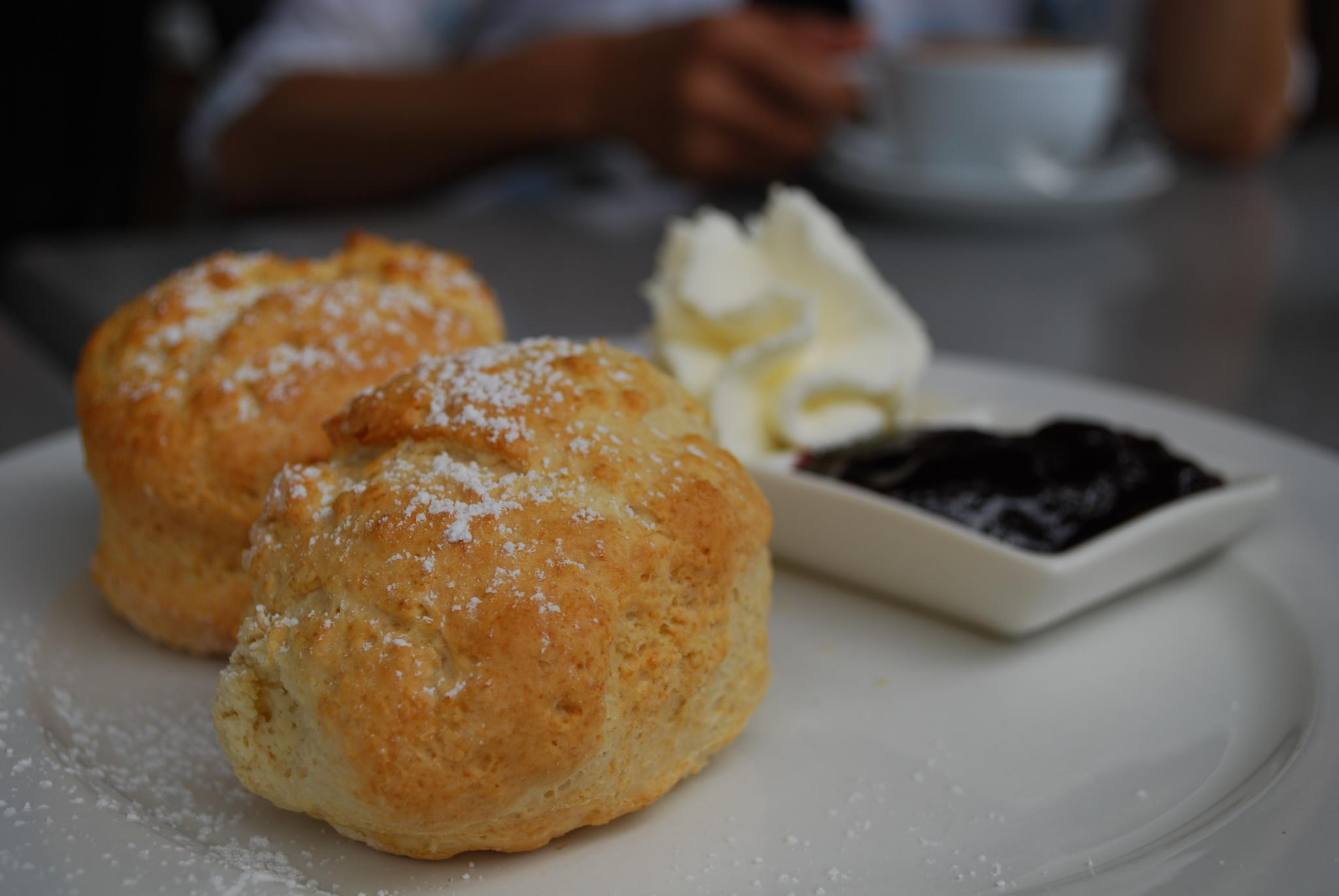
Scones with jam

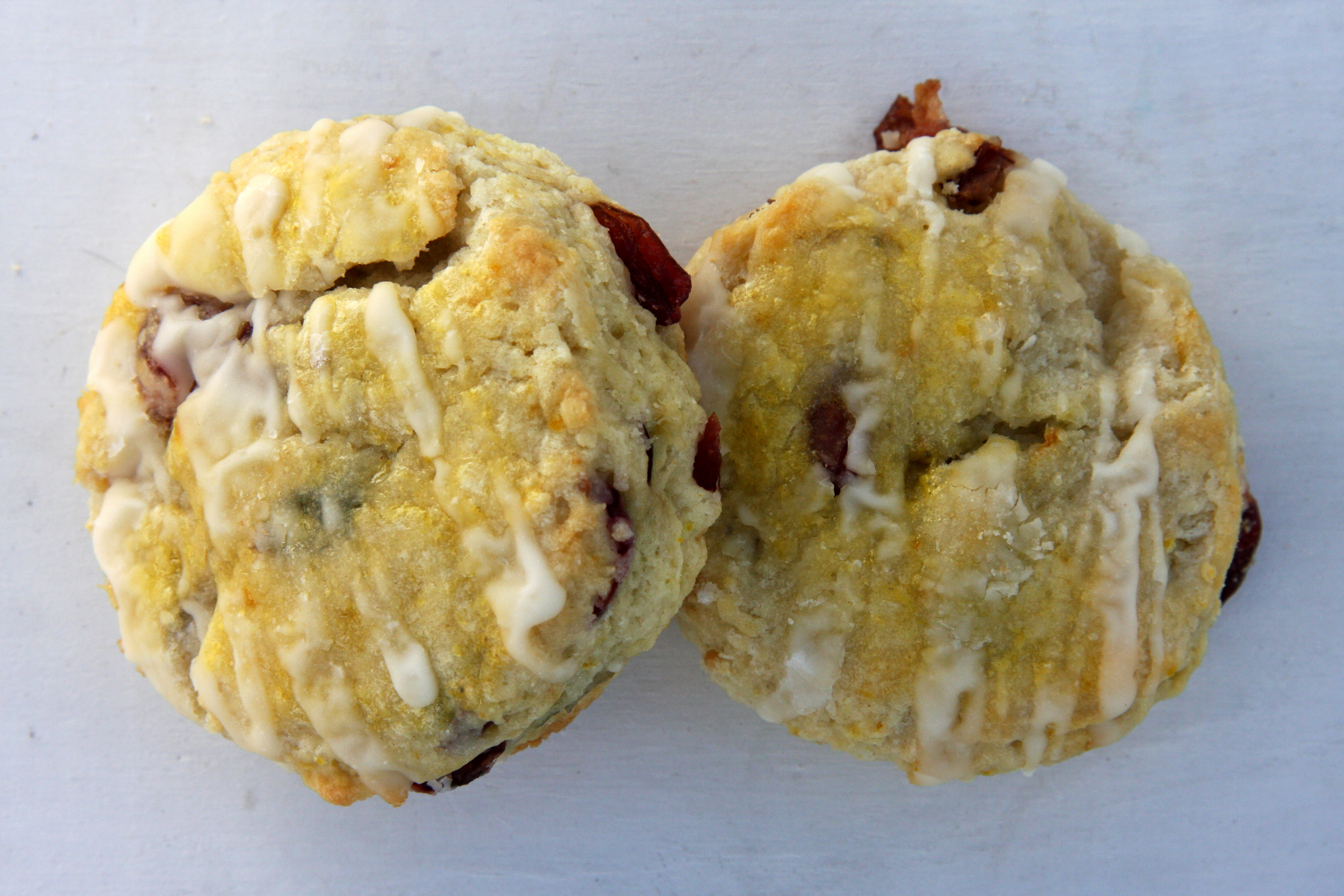
Cranberry scones with icing

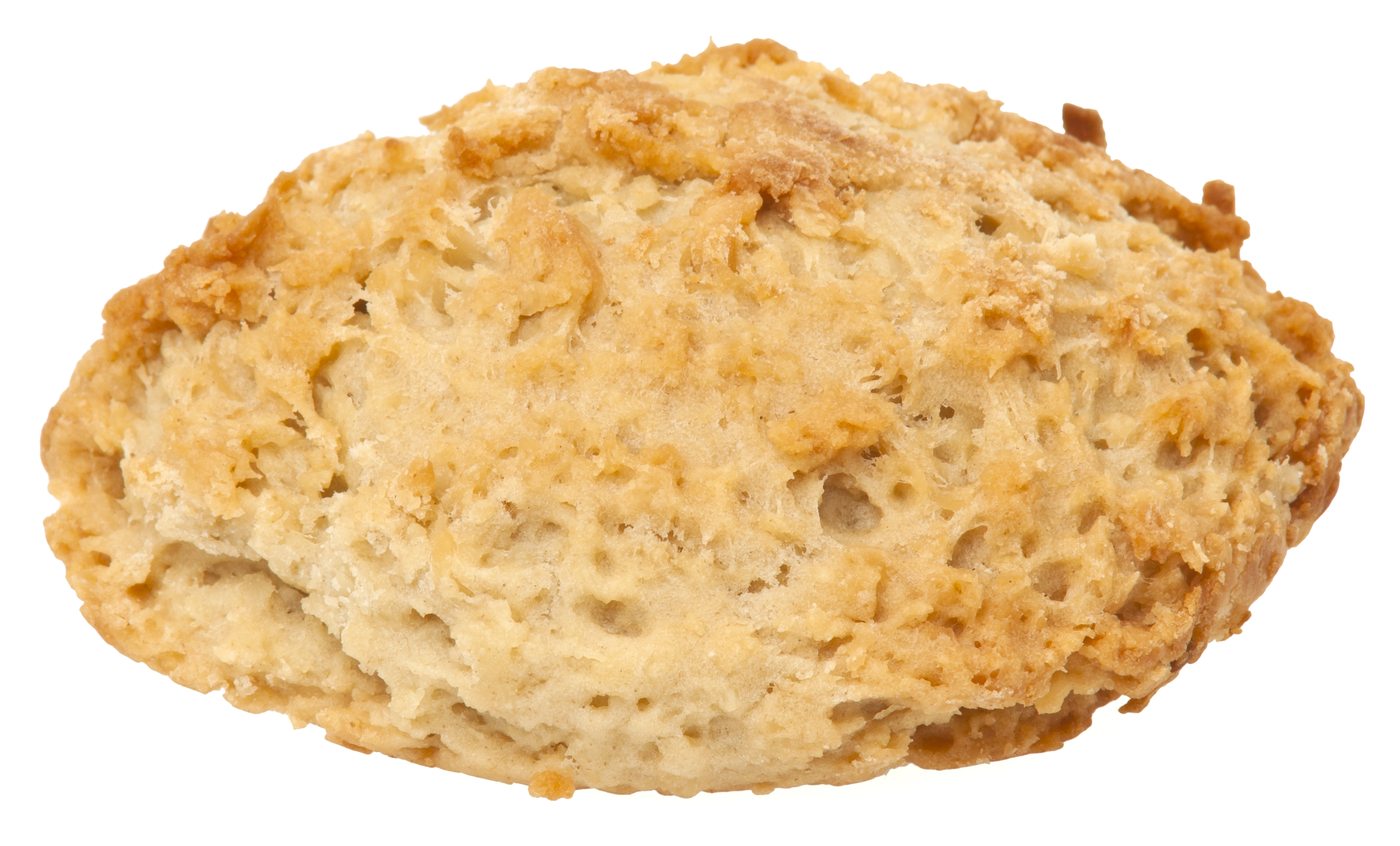
A sweet rock cake

Cookies are small, sweet baked treats. They originated as small cakes, and some traditional cookies have a soft, cake-like texture. Others are crisp or hard.

Examples of cookies

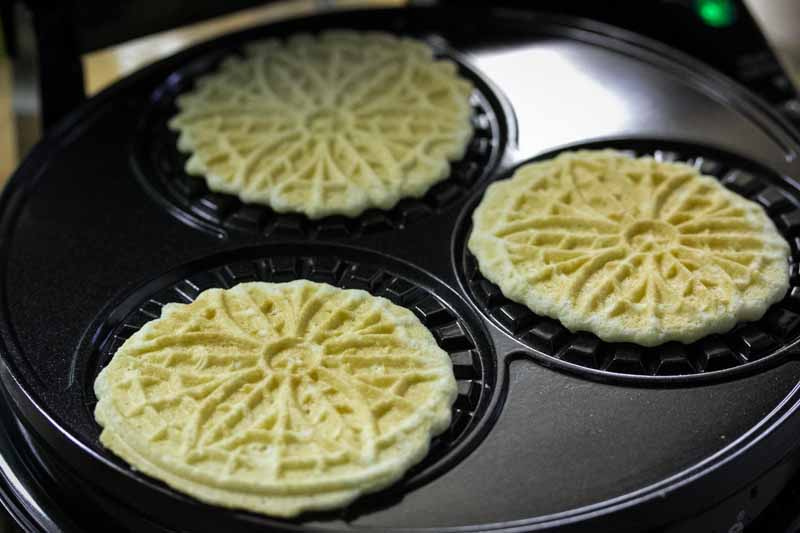
Thin wafer cookies such as pizzelle have been made since the Middle Ages.

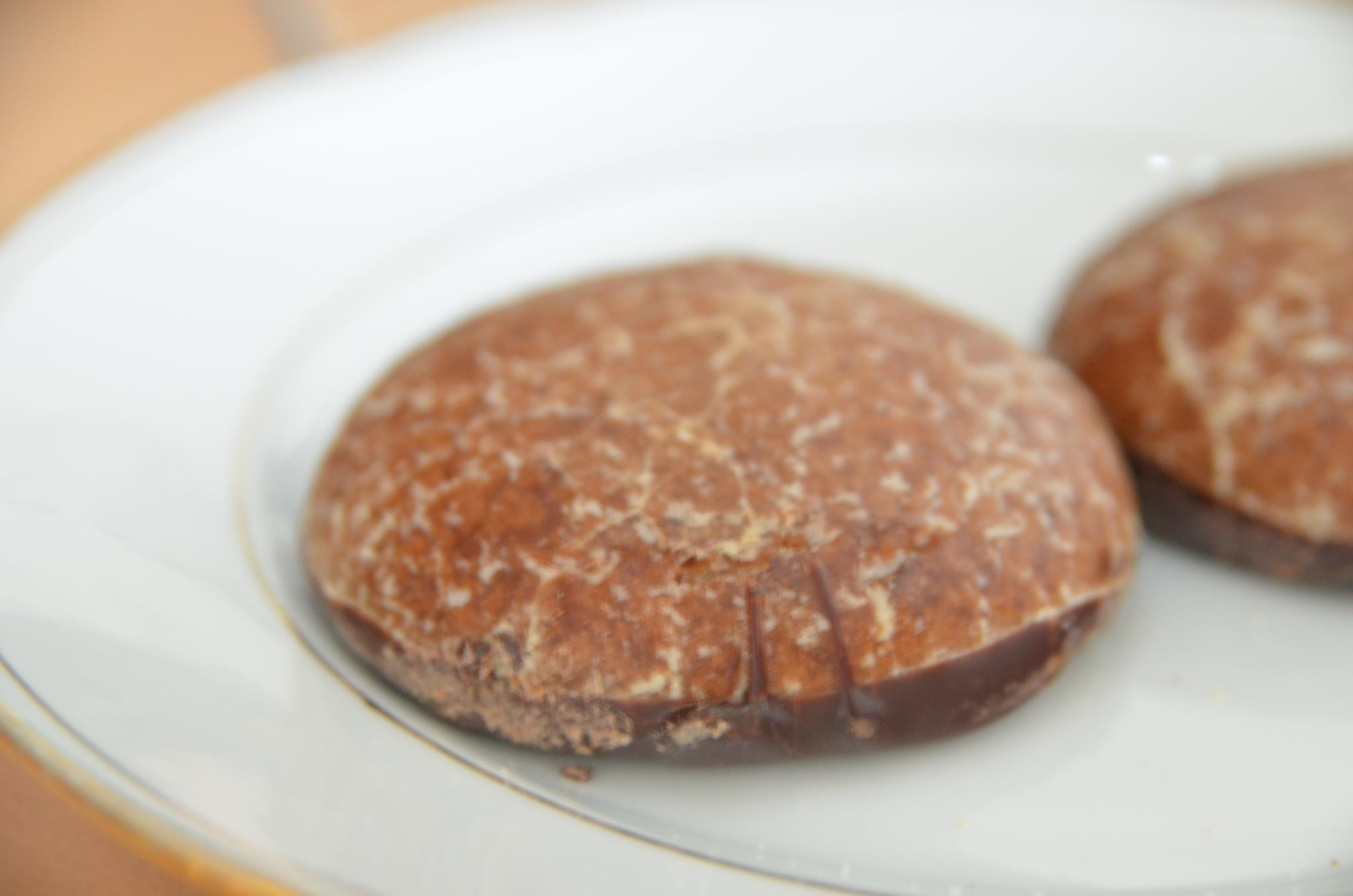
Spicy lebkuchen are a German Christmas treat.

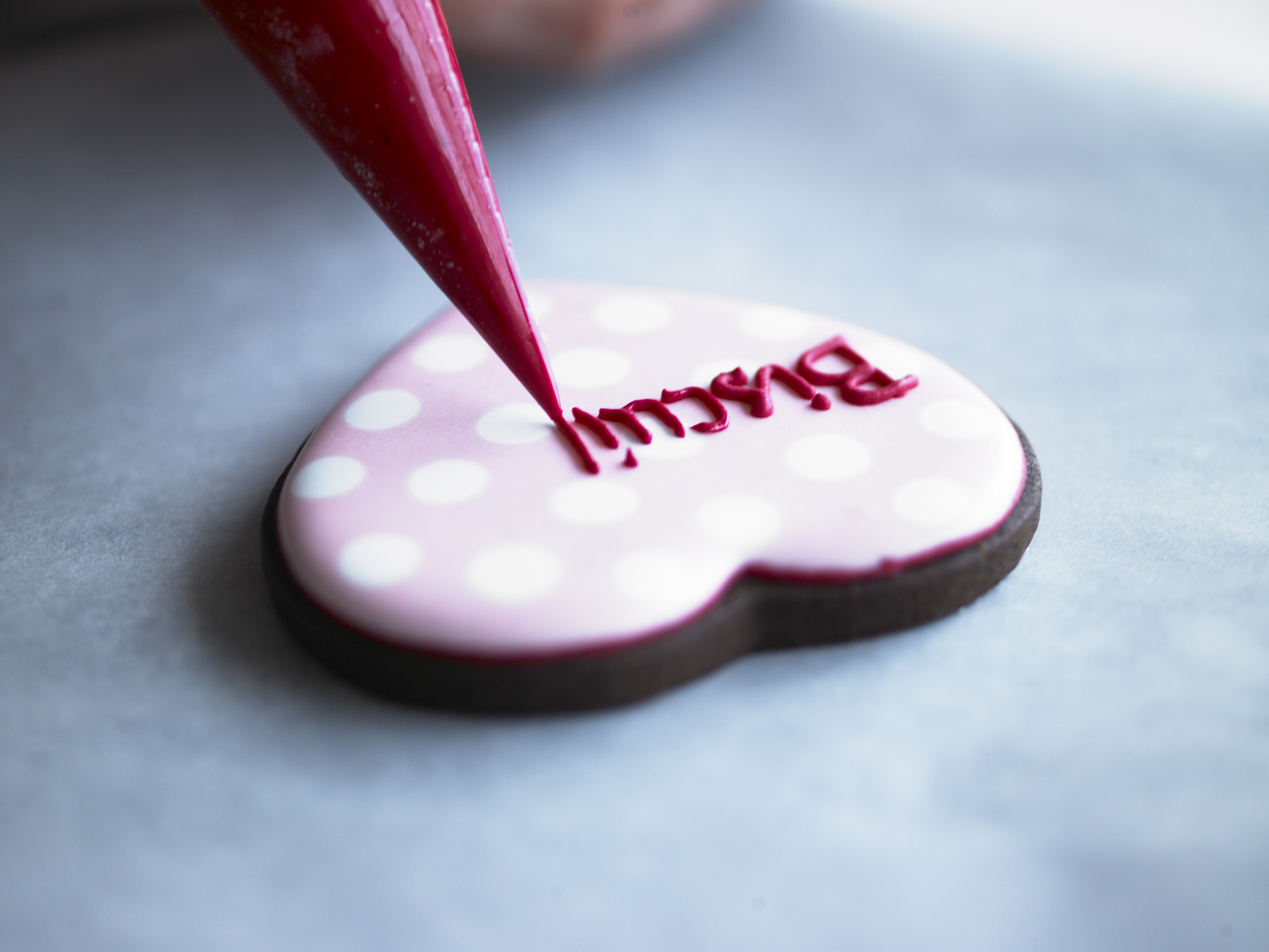
Cookies can be elaborately decorated.

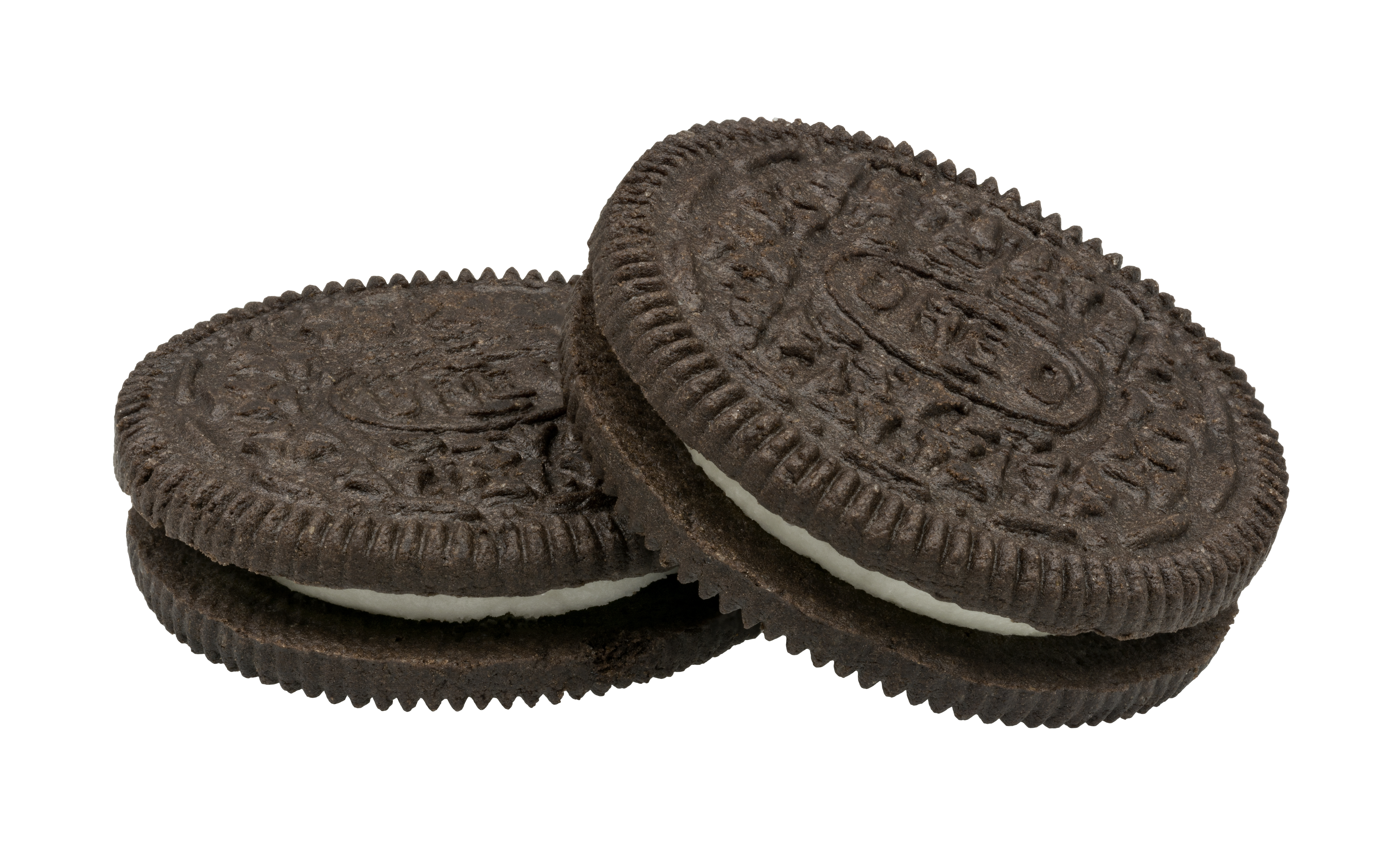
Oreos are an example of a mass-produced cookie.

== Sugar confectionery ==
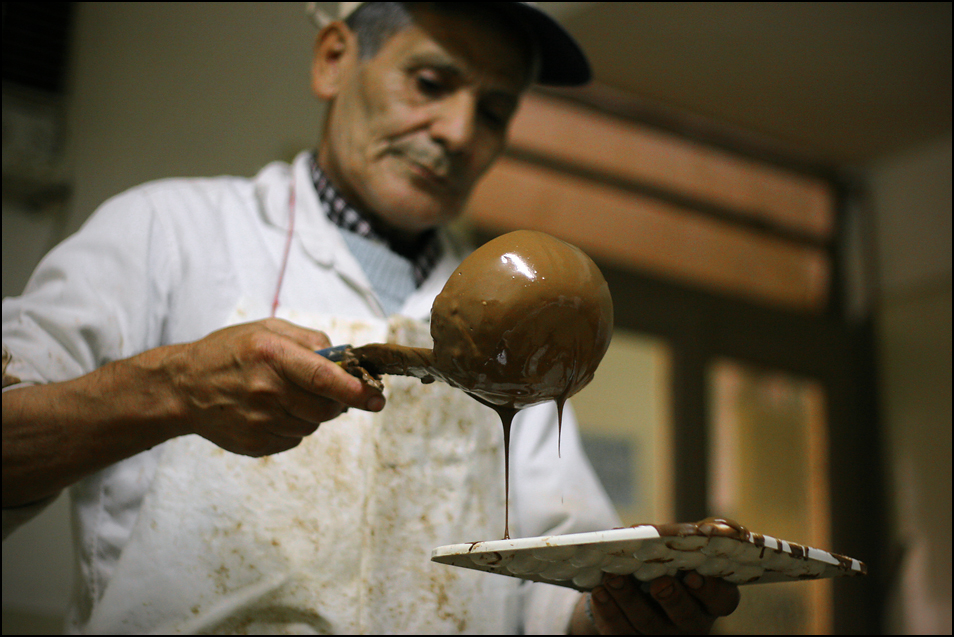
Depending on the chosen classification scheme, ice cream and chocolate confections may be treated separately or as part of sugar confectionery.

Sugar confections include sweet, sugar-based foods, which are usually eaten as snack food. This includes sugar candies, chocolates, candied fruits and nuts, chewing gum, and sometimes ice cream. In some cases, chocolate confections are treated as a separate category, as are sugar-free versions of sugar confections.

Different dialects of English use regional terms for sugar confections:

- In Britain, Ireland, and some Commonwealth countries, sweets (the Scottish Gaelic word suiteis is a derivative). Candy is used specifically for rock candy and occasionally for (brittle) boiled sweets. Lollies are boiled sweets, usually flat, fixed on sticks.
- In Australia and New Zealand, Lollies, Chewy and Chuddy are Australian slang for chewing gum.
- In North America, candy, although this term generally refers to a specific range of confectionery and does not include some items of sugar confectionery (e.g. ice cream). Sweet is occasionally used, as well as treat.

In the US, a chocolate-coated candy bar (e.g. Snickers) would be called a candy bar, in Britain more likely a chocolate bar than unspecifically a sweet.

Comparison of terms
	American English	British English
chocolate fudge	confectionery (formal, uncommon, broad)	confectionery (formal, narrow)
sugar crystals on a stick	rock candy, rock sugar	sugar candy, candy, rock, rock sweet
several pieces of hard sugar candy in someone's hand	hard candy	boiled sweet, candy (rare)
	candied fruit, glazed fruit	candied fruit
Cotton candy being made	cotton candy, fairy floss (archaic)	candy floss
assorted candies in a bowl	candy, treat (rare), sweet (rare)	sweet
slice of Bakewell tart with sherbet	dessert	pudding, sweet, dessert
vanilla pudding in a bowl, with a cookie	pudding	custard, blancmange, jelly
milk chocolate bar	chocolate candy bar, chocolate bar (solid blocks of chocolate)	chocolate bar, bar of chocolate (e.g., Cadbury's Milk Chocolate)
Snickers candy bar, cut in half	candy bar (chocolate coated types)	chocolate bar (e.g. Snickers)
white box with about 20 bite-sized chocolate candies in it	box of chocolates	chocolates, box of chocolates

=== Classification ===
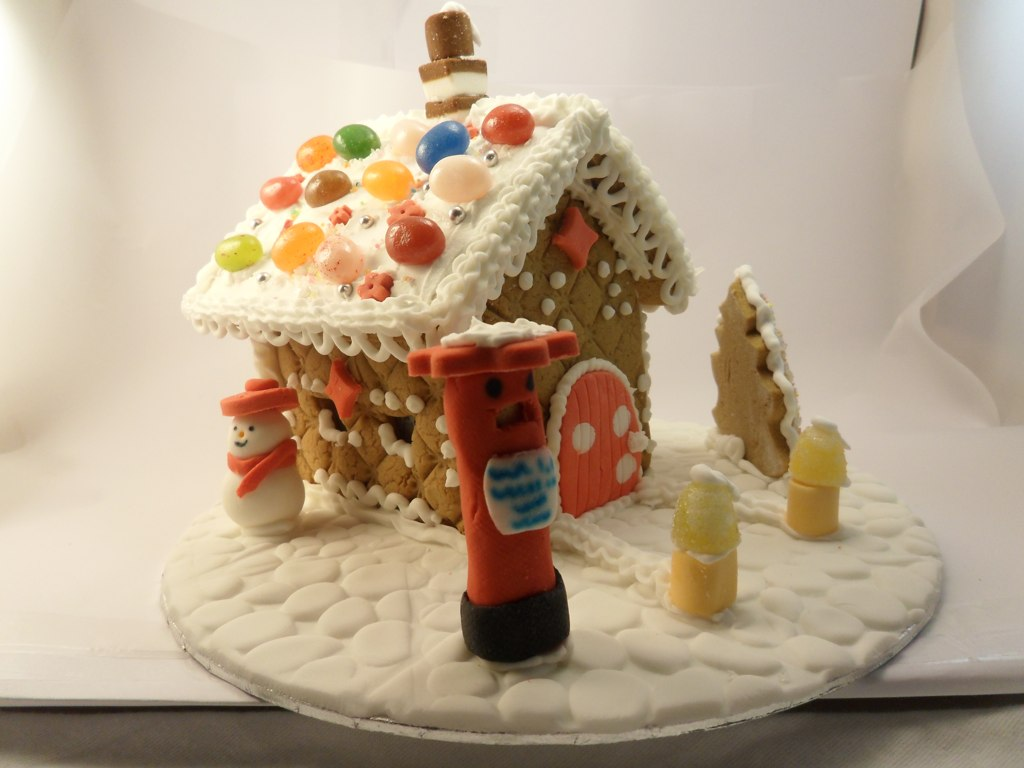
This gingerbread house has walls and roof made from cookie dough and decorations made from icing and sugar candy. Classification is sometimes challenging because products can overlap categories.

The United Nations' International Standard Industrial Classification of All Economic Activities (ISIC) scheme (revision 4) classifies both chocolate and sugar confectionery as ISIC 1073, which includes the manufacture of chocolate and chocolate confectionery; sugar confectionery proper (caramels, cachous, nougats, fondant, white chocolate), chewing gum, preserving fruit, nuts, fruit peels, and making confectionery lozenges and pastilles. In the European Union, the Statistical Classification of Economic Activities in the European Community (NACE) scheme (revision 2) matches the UN classification, under code number 10.82.

In the United States, the North American Industry Classification System (NAICS 2012) splits sugar confectionery across three categories: National industry code 311340 for all non-chocolate confectionery manufacturing, 311351 for chocolate and confectionery manufacturing from cacao beans, and national industry 311352 for confectionery manufacturing from purchased chocolate.

Ice cream and sorbet are classified with dairy products under ISIC 1050, NACE 10.52, and NAICS 311520. The classification of ice cream has varied widely; for example, in 1930, it was classified as a form of flour confectionery.

=== Examples ===
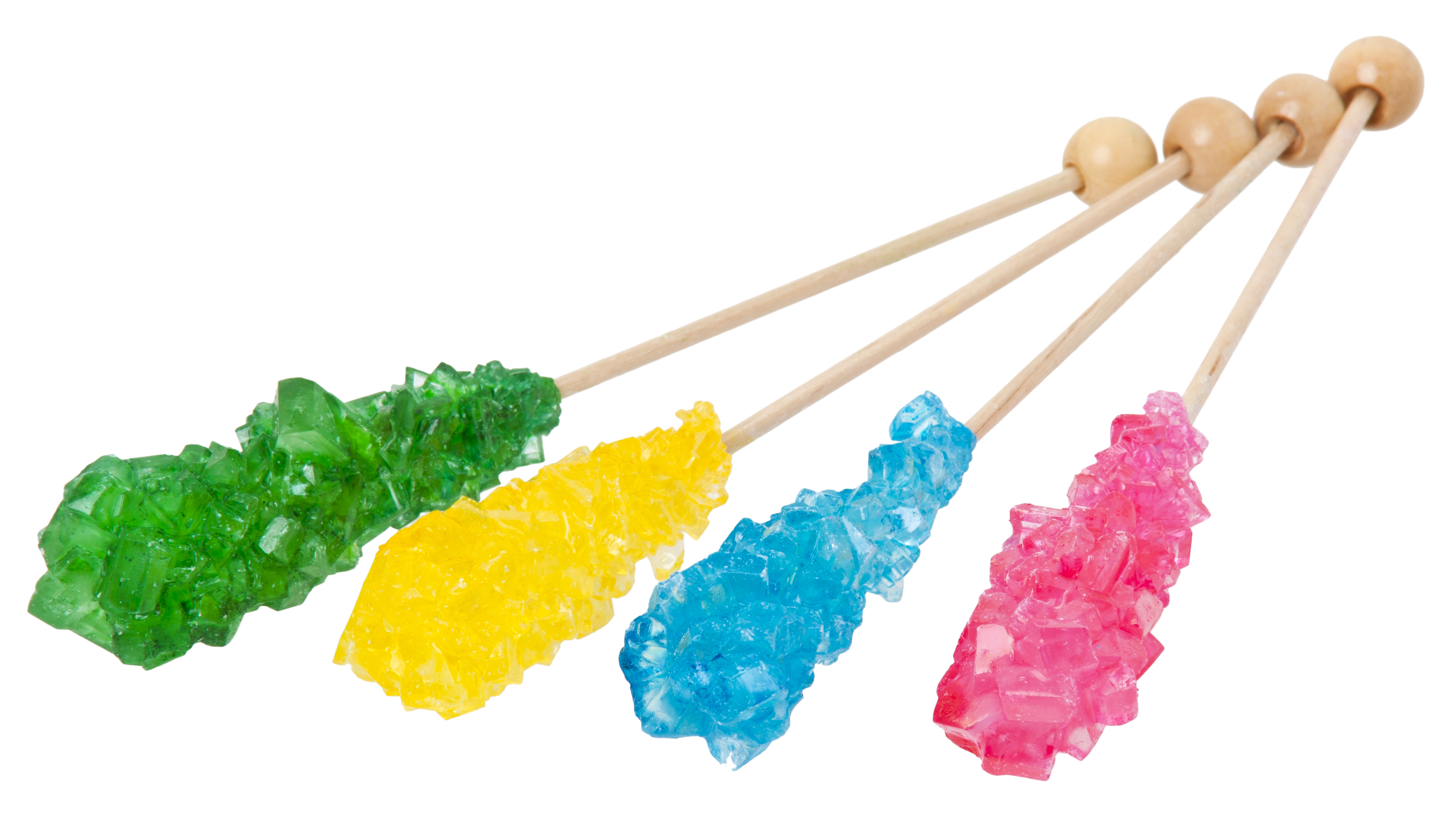
Rock candy is simply sugar, with optional coloring or flavor.

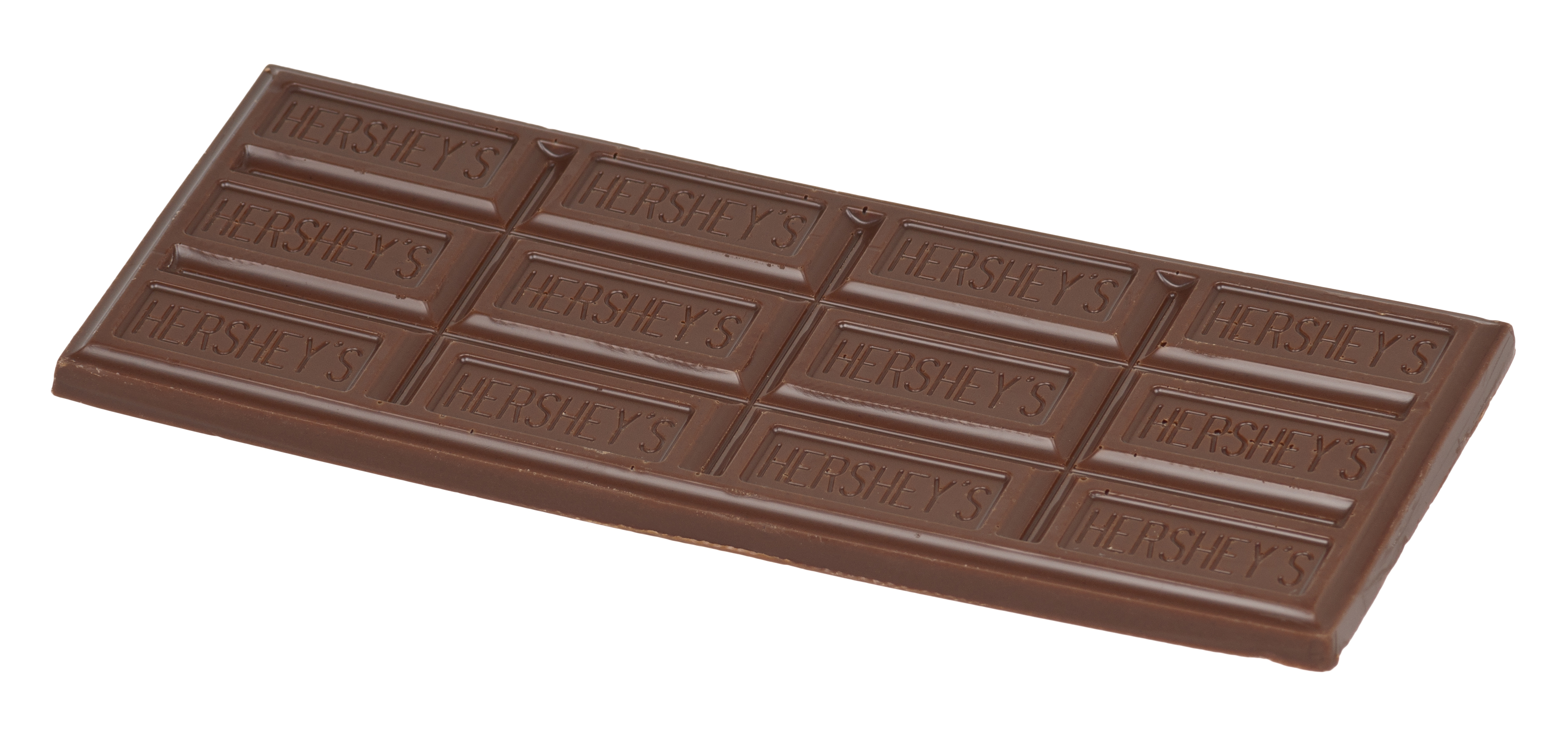
A bar of chocolate, which can either be consumed as-is or used as an ingredient in other dishes.

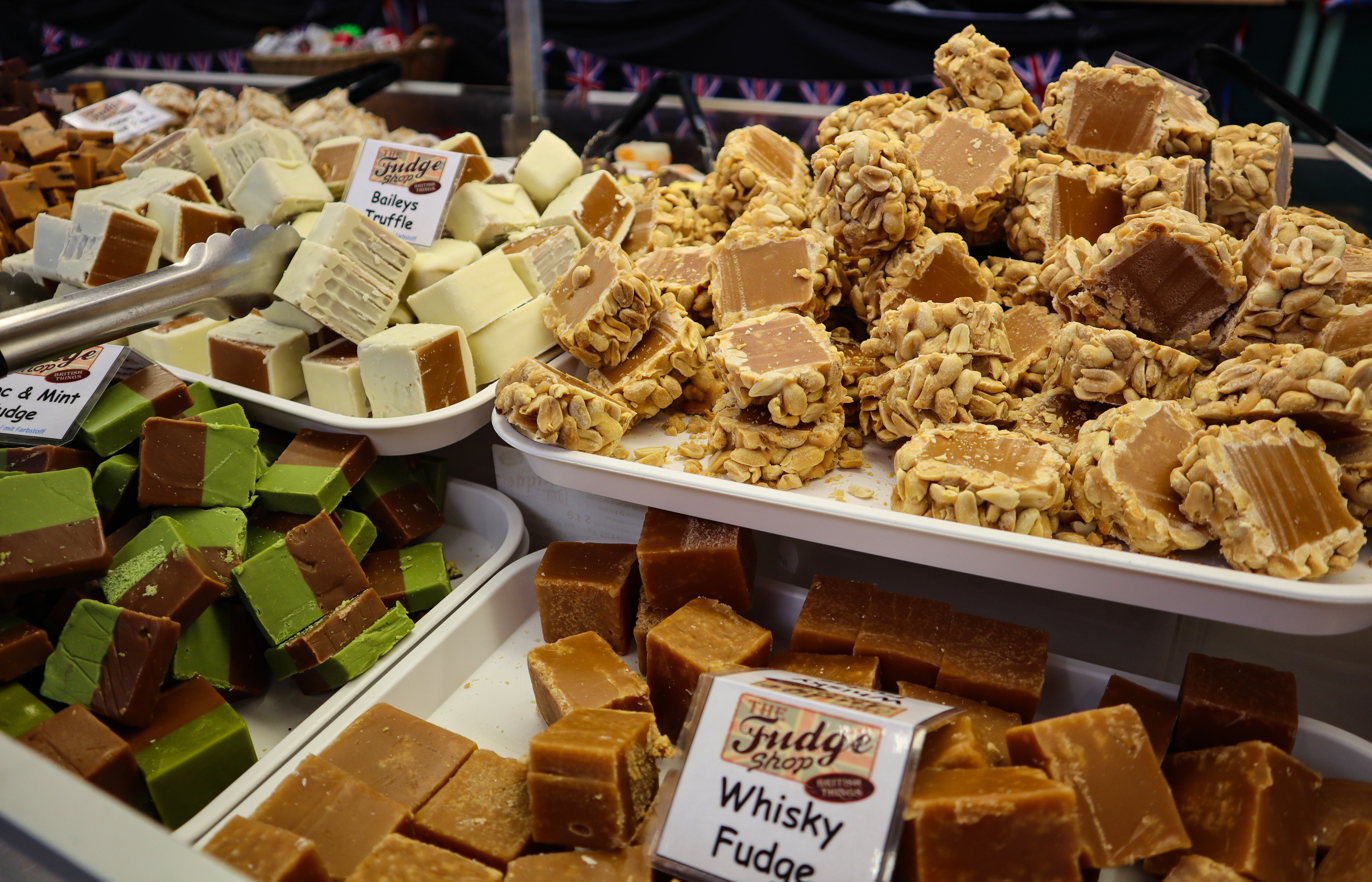
Assorted fudges

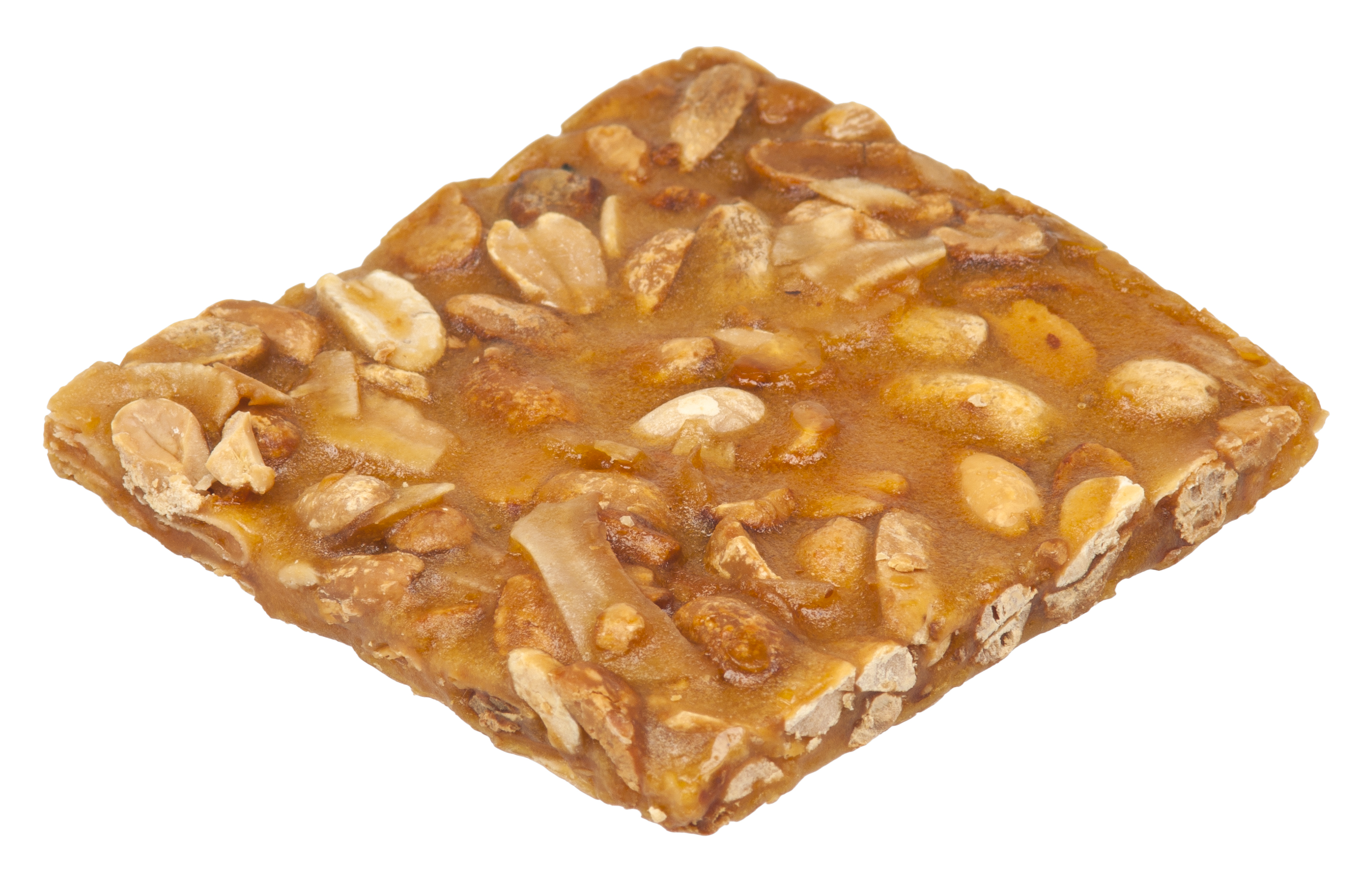
Brittles are a combination of nuts and caramelized sugar.

Sugar confectionery items include candies, lollipops, candy bars, chocolate, cotton candy, and other sweet items of snack food. Some of the categories and types of sugar confectionery include the following:

- Chocolates: Bite-sized confectioneries generally made with chocolate, considered different from a candy bar made of chocolate.
- Divinity: A nougat-like confectionery based on egg whites with chopped nuts.
- Dodol: A toffee-like delicacy popular in Indonesia, Malaysia, and the Philippines
- Dragée: Sugar-coated almonds and other types of sugar panned candies.
- Fudge: Made by boiling milk and sugar to the soft-ball stage. In the US, it tends to be chocolate-flavored.
- Halvah: Confectionery based on tahini, a paste made from ground sesame seeds.
- Hard candy: Based on sugars cooked to the hard-crack stage. Examples include lollipops, jawbreakers (or gobstoppers), lemon drops, peppermint drops and disks, candy canes, rock candy, etc. Also included are types often mixed with nuts such as brittle, which is similar to chikkis.
- Ice cream: Frozen, flavored cream, often containing small pieces of chocolate, fruits and/or nuts.
- Jelly candies: Including those based on sugar and starch, pectin, gum, or gelatin such as Turkish delight (lokum), jelly beans, gumdrops, jujubes, gummies, etc.
- Liquorice: Containing extract of the liquorice root, this candy is chewier and more resilient than gums or gelatin candies. For example, Liquorice allsorts. It has a similar taste to star anise.
- Marshmallow: For example, circus peanuts, Flumps.
- Marzipan: An almond-based confection, doughy in consistency.
- Mithai: A generic term for confectionery in the Indian subcontinent, typically made from dairy products and/or some form of flour. Sugar or molasses are used as sweeteners.
- Nougat: Various forms of sweetened paste hardened to a chewy or crunchy consistency, usually flavored with nuts or candied fruit.
- Persipan: similar to marzipan, but made with peaches or apricots instead of almonds.
- Pastillage: A thick sugar paste made with gelatin, water, and confectioner's sugar, similar to gum paste, which is moulded into shapes, which then harden.
- Tablet: A crumbly milk-based soft and hard candy, based on sugars cooked to the soft ball stage. Comes in several forms, such as wafers and heart shapes. Not to be confused with tableting, a method of candy production.
- Taffy (British: chews): A sugar confection that is folded many times above 120 °F (50 °C), incorporating air bubbles, thus reducing its density and making it opaque.
- Toffee: A confection made by caramelizing sugar or molasses along with butter. Toffee has a glossy surface and textures ranging from soft and sticky to a hard, brittle material. Its brown color and smoky taste arise from the caramelization of the sugars.

=== Storage and shelf life ===
Shelf life is largely determined by the amount of water present in the candy and the storage conditions. High-sugar candies, such as boiled candies, can have a shelf life of many years if kept covered in a dry environment. Spoilage of low-moisture candies tends to involve a loss of shape, color, texture, and flavor, rather than the growth of dangerous microbes. Impermeable packaging can reduce spoilage due to storage conditions.

Candies spoil more quickly if they have different amounts of water in different parts of the candy (for example, a candy that combines marshmallow and nougat), or if they are stored in high-moisture environments. This process is due to the effects of water activity, which results in the transfer of unwanted water from a high-moisture environment into a low-moisture candy, rendering it rubbery, or the loss of desirable water from a high-moisture candy into a dry environment, rendering the candy dry and brittle.

Another factor, affecting only non-crystalline amorphous candies, is the glass transition process. This can cause amorphous candies to lose their intended texture.

== Retail ==
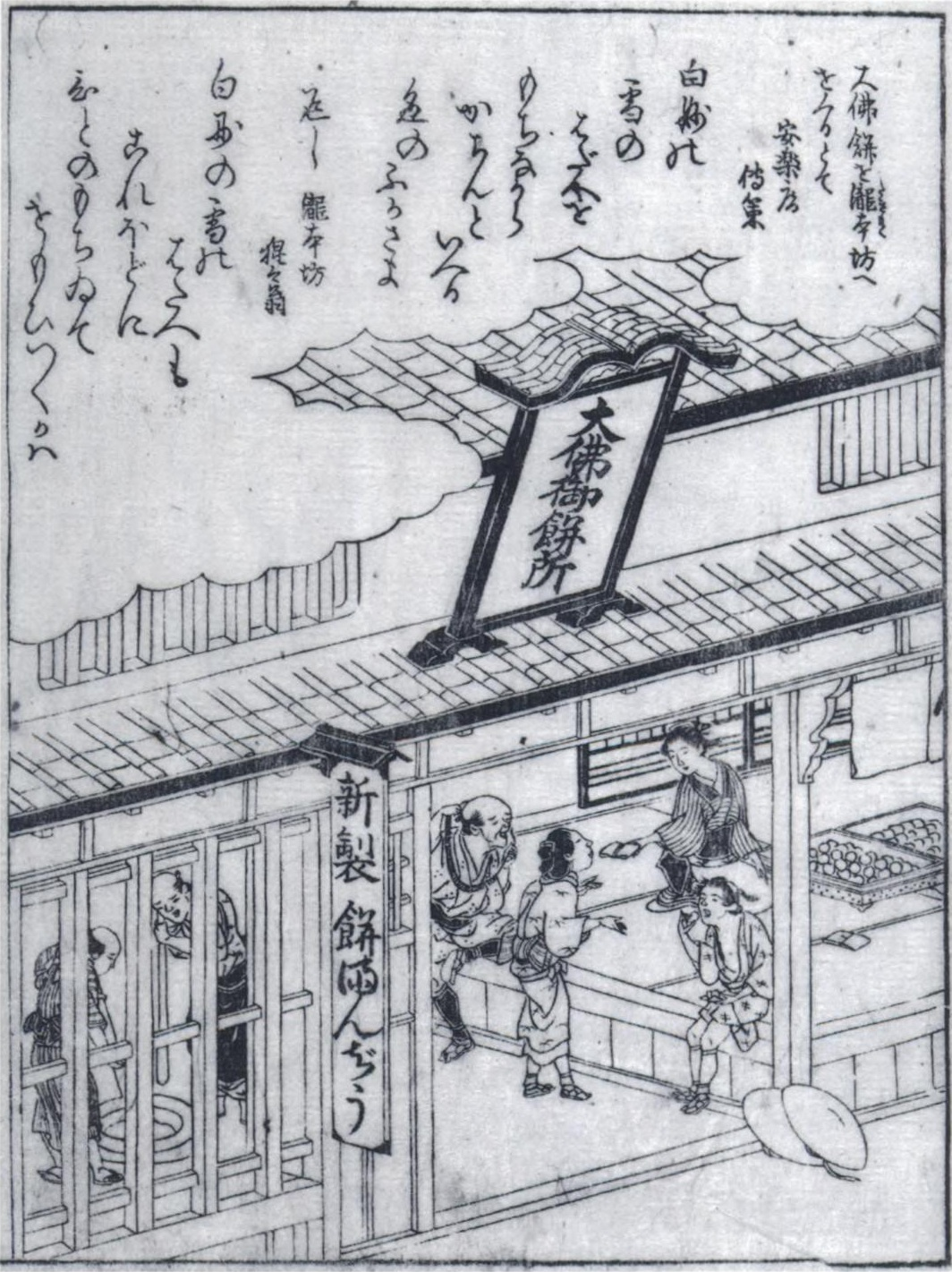
A Japanese vendor selling sweets (wagashi) in "The Great Buddha Sweet Shop" from the Miyako meisho zue (ja:都名所図会) (1787)

Confectionery is often, though not exclusively, sold through confectionery stores. These may sell locally-made sweets distinct to the region, international sweets, or "vintage" delicacies like rock candy and liquorice. Confectionery stores contain diverse and unique flavours of sweets (candy). Dedicated confectionery stores are popular in many countries due to their low start-up cost, high markup potential, and diverse appeal, but their numbers can vary widely in countries such as the United States.

== Cultural roles ==
Both baker's and sugar confections are used to offer hospitality to guests.

Confections are used to mark celebrations or events, such as Christmas, Easter, a wedding cake, birthday cake, or Halloween.

The chocolate company Cadbury (under the guidance of Richard Cadbury) was the first to commercialize the connection between romance and confectionery, producing a heart-shaped box of chocolates for Valentine's Day in 1868.

Tourists commonly eat confections as part of their travels. The indulgence in rich, sugary foods is seen as a special treat, and choosing local specialties is popular. For example, visitors to Vienna eat Sachertorte and visitors to seaside resorts in the UK eat Blackpool rock candy. Transportable confections like fudges and tablet may be purchased as souvenirs.

== Nutrition ==
Generally, confections are low in micronutrients and protein but high in calories. They may be fat-free foods, although some confections, especially fried doughs and chocolate, are high-fat foods. Many confections are considered empty calories and ultra-processed foods. Specially formulated chocolate has been manufactured in the past for military use as a high-density food energy source.

Many sugar confections, especially caramel-coated popcorn and the different kinds of sugar candy, are defined in US law as foods of minimal nutritional value.

== Risks ==
Contaminants and coloring agents in confectionery can be particularly harmful to children. Therefore, confectionery contaminants, such as high levels of lead, have been restricted to 1 ppm in the US. There is no specific maximum in the EU.

Candy colorants, particularly yellow colorants such as E102 Tartrazine, E104 Quinoline Yellow WS and E110 Sunset Yellow FCF, have many restrictions around the world. Tartrazine, for example, can cause allergic and asthmatic reactions and was once banned in Austria, Germany, and Norway. Some countries such as the UK have asked the food industry to phase out the use of these colorants, especially for products marketed to children.

== See also ==
- Candy making
- Confectionery store
- List of candies
- List of foods
- List of top-selling candy brands
