= Christmas gift-bringer =

Type of folkloric Christmas figures

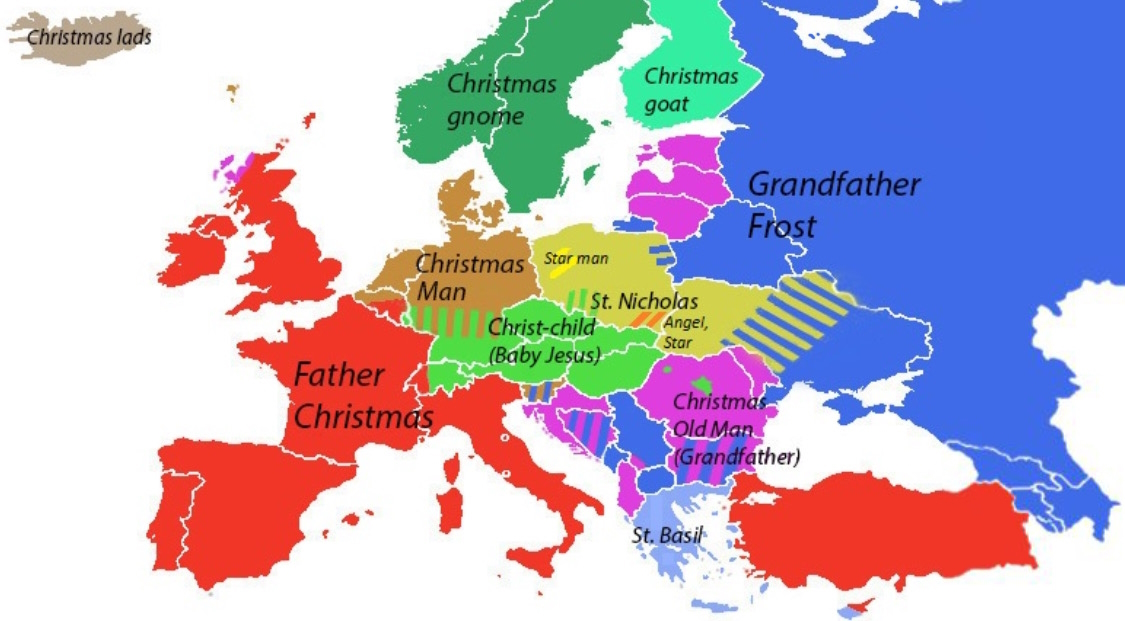
Christmas gift-bringers in Europe

A number of Midwinter or Christmas traditions in European folklore involve gift-bringers. Mostly involving the figure of a bearded old man, the traditions have mutually influenced one another, and have adopted aspects from Christian hagiography, even before the modern period. In Eastern Slavic countries, the figure is Father Frost. In Scandinavia, it is an elf-like figure or tomten who comes at Yule (and who sometimes also takes the form of a goat). In German-speaking Europe and Latin Europe, it became associated with the Christian Saint Nicholas. In some parts of Central Europe, there is a separate tradition of a young child or fairy-like being bringing presents, known as Christkind. Early modern England had Father Christmas, a character initially associated with feasting and good cheer, though he was not originally a gift bringer.

From these European traditions, the North American figure of Santa Claus developed, beginning in the 1820s. The American figure in turn had considerable influence on the various European traditions during the 19th and 20th centuries. For example, Father Christmas in England and Joulupukki in Finland gradually took on the attributes of the American Santa Claus during the 19th and 20th centuries respectively, the two characters eventually becoming indistinguishable from the American one.

== Origins ==
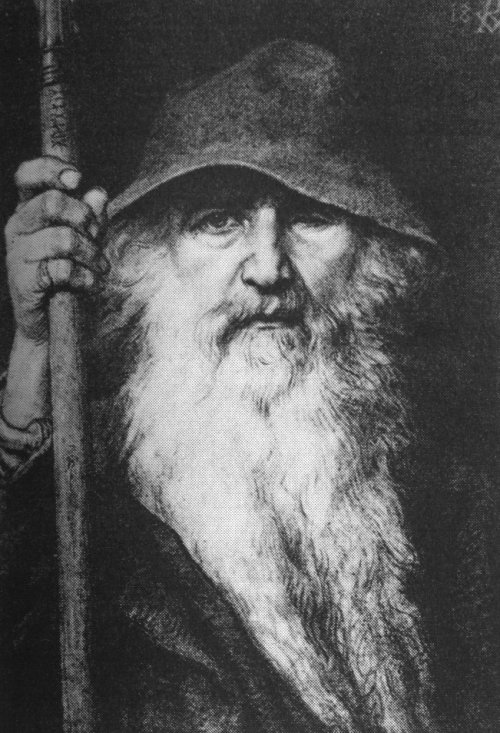
An 1886 depiction of Odin by Georg von Rosen.

Santa Claus's reindeer has also been compared to Sleipnir, the eight-legged horse of Odin in Norse mythology.

Jacob Grimm (Deutsche Mythologie) traces the threatening or scary companions of Saint Nicholas (such as the Krampus of the Austro-Bavarian dialect region) to Christianized versions of household spirits (kobolds, elves).

After Christianization, the benign mid-winter gift-bringer was associated with the 4th-century Christian Saint Nicholas of Myra. This association took place mainly in the territories of the Holy Roman Empire, including German-speaking Europe, the Low Countries, the Czech lands, Hungary and Slovakia. The basis of this association is that Saint Nicholas was noted for his generous gifts to the poor, in particular presenting the three impoverished daughters of a pious Christian with dowries so that they would not have to become prostitutes.

== European folklore ==
There are numerous traditions of Christmas gift-bringers in European folklore. They can be loosely classified in variations of an "Old Man" (Old Man Winter, Father Christmas) or a "child" or "girl" tradition. The "Old Man" is frequently syncretised with the hagiographical traditions of Saint Nicholas and Saint Basil.

In some countries, many traditions can co-exist. In Italy, for example, there are Babbo Natale ("Father Christmas", a local version of Santa Claus) and the Befana, a witch-like old lady that rides a broomstick and brings candies on Epiphany's eve. In some areas of Northern Italy (Bergamo, Brescia, Cremona, Lodi, Mantova, Parma, Piacenza, Reggio Emilia, Verona, Trento, Udine) there is Santa Lucia, a veiled blind old woman who on December 13 brings gifts to children, riding a donkey that tows a cart, accompanied by her helper Castaldo or Castaldòn. In other areas there is Gesù bambino ("Child Jesus"), and in many parts of Switzerland and northeastern Italy (east of the Piave river), Saint Nicholas is also celebrated on December 6.

In Spain, the tradition of the Three Wise Men, or Los Reyes Magos, plays a central role in Christmas celebrations. These figures are believed to bring gifts to children on the night of January 5, in commemoration of their journey to present offerings to the infant Jesus. Festivities often include a grand parade called the Cabalgata de Reyes, where the Three Kings distribute sweets and interact with the crowd. Children write letters to the Wise Men, similar to letters to Santa Claus, and leave out treats for them and their camels. This celebration culminates on January 6, Día de Reyes, which is a public holiday marked by family gatherings.

== See also ==
- List of Christmas and winter gift-bringers
- Saint Nicholas Day
- Christmas gift
