= Saint Nicholas (European folklore) =

Legendary figure

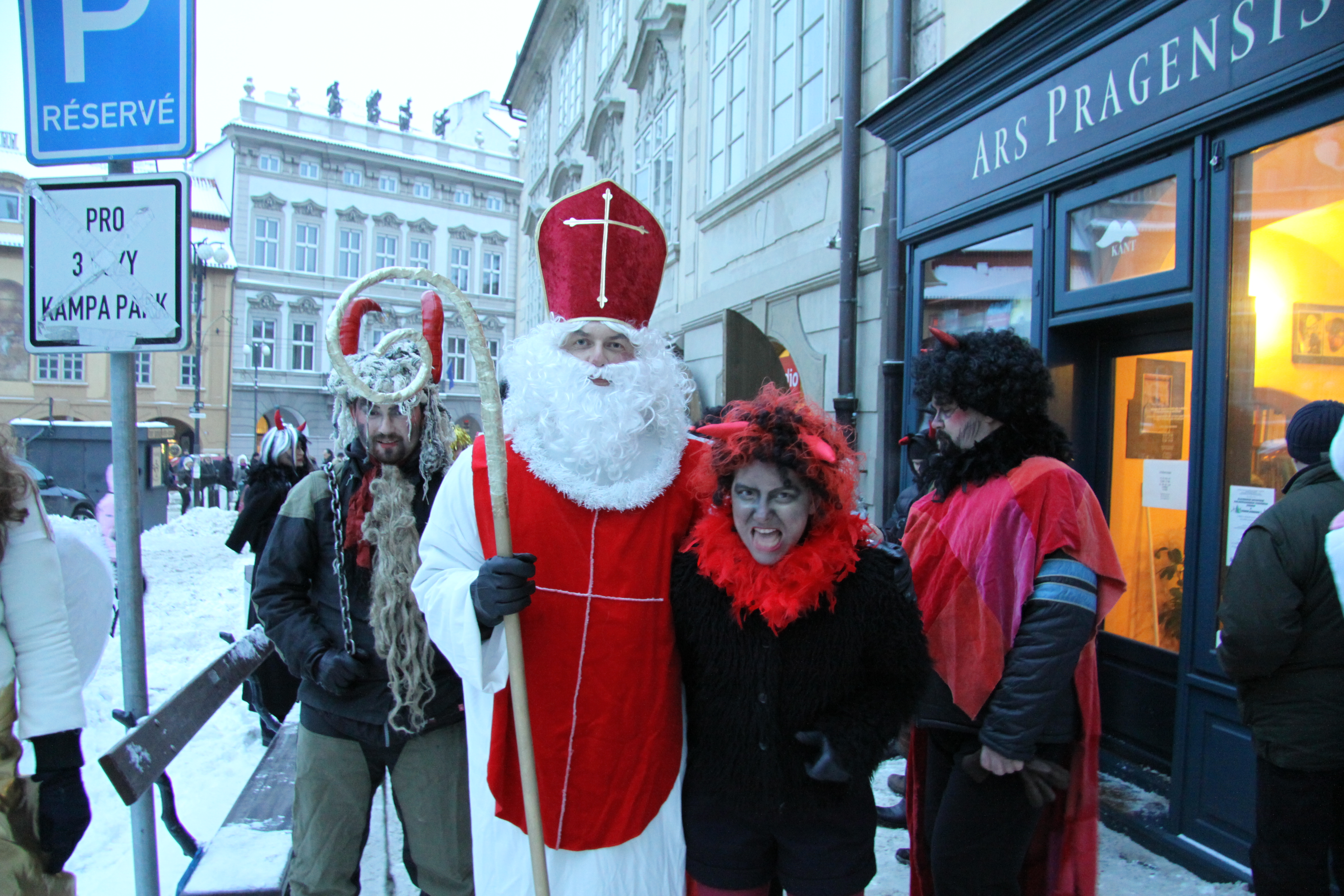
- Saint Nicholas in Prague

Creature information
- Other name(s): Nikolaus, Svatý Mikuláš, Mikulás, Samichlaus, Sveti Nikola, Saint Nicolas, Święty Mikołaj, Moș Nicolae, Sinterklaas, Svätý Mikuláš, Sveti Miklavž, Sviatyi Mykolai
- Similar entities: Sinterklaas, Ded Moroz, Ayaz Ata, Christkind, Santa Claus, Father Christmas
- Folklore: Christian, European

Origin
- Country: Germany, Poland, Czech Republic, Slovakia, Ukraine, Romania, Hungary, Austria, Switzerland, Liechtenstein, Croatia, Slovenia, Netherlands, Luxembourg, Belgium, France
- Region: Benelux, Central Europe, Pannonian Plain, Balkans, Eastern Europe, Southern Germany
- Habitat: Anatolia, Spain

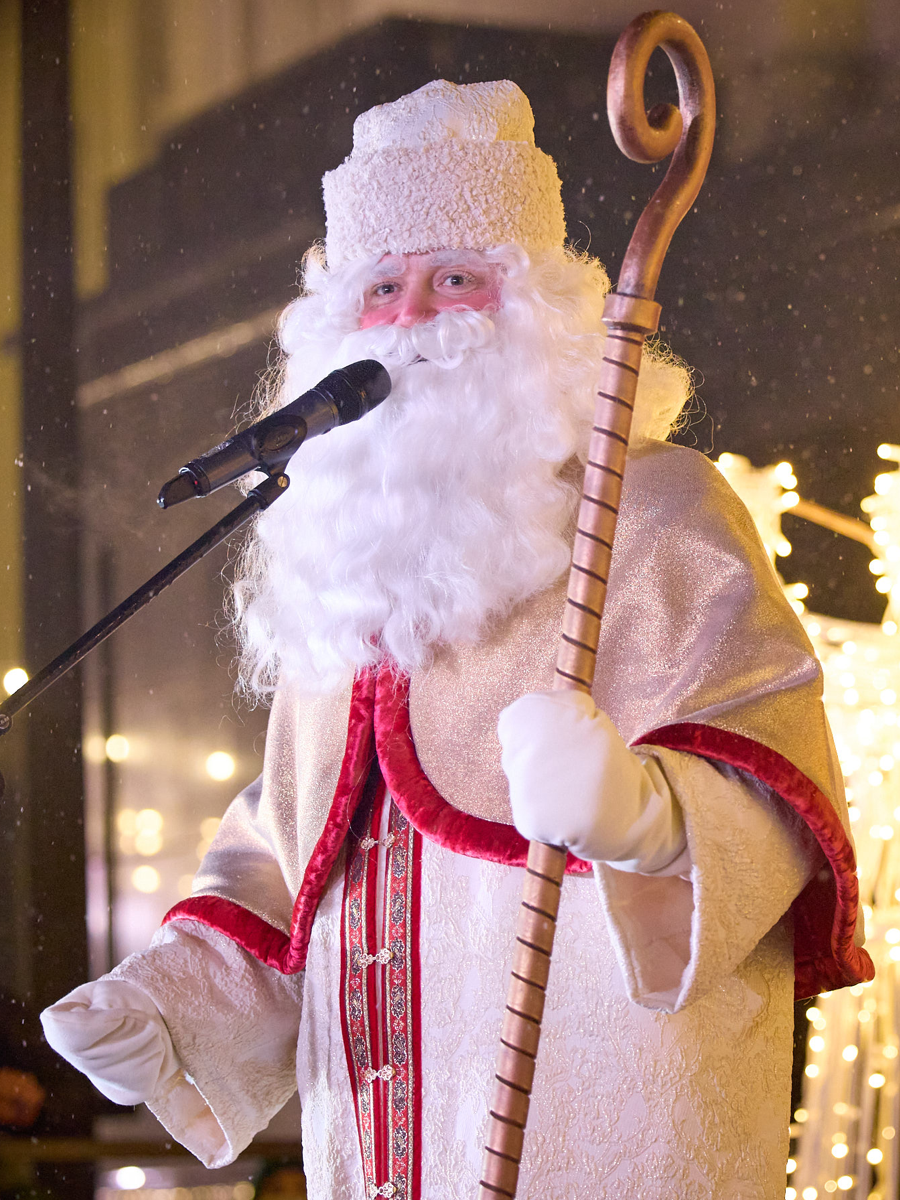
Saint Nicholas (Sviatyi Mykolai) opening his residence near the presidential office in Kyiv

Saint Nicholas is a figure in European folklore based on the Greek early Christian bishop Nicholas of Myra, patron saint of children.

On Saint Nicholas Day, children wait for Saint Nicholas to come and put a present under their pillow or in a boot on their windowsill, provided that the children were good during the year. Children who behaved badly may expect to find a twig or a piece of coal under their pillows. In the Netherlands (see Sinterklaas) and in Luxembourg, children put out a shoe filled with hay and a carrot for Saint Nicholas's horse.

It is believed that Saint Nicholas arrives to celebrate his day, December 6 (December 19 according to the Julian calendar), and leaves before Christmas. This tradition is well known and celebrated in Austria (Austrian German: Nikolo), Belgium, Croatia (Croatian: Sveti Nikola), the Czech Republic (Czech: Svatý Mikuláš), north-east France (French: Saint Nicolas), western and southern Germany (German: Sankt Nikolaus), Switzerland (Swiss German: Samichlaus), Hungary (Hungarian: Mikulás), Luxembourg (Luxembourgish: Kleeschen), the Netherlands (Dutch: Sinterklaas), Poland (Polish: Święty Mikołaj), Romania (Romanian: Moș Nicolae), Serbia (Serbian: Свети Никола, Sveti Nikola), Slovakia (Slovak: Svätý Mikuláš), Slovenia (Slovene: Sveti Miklavž), and Ukraine (Ukrainian: Святий Миколай, Sviatyi Mykolai).

== Treats ==
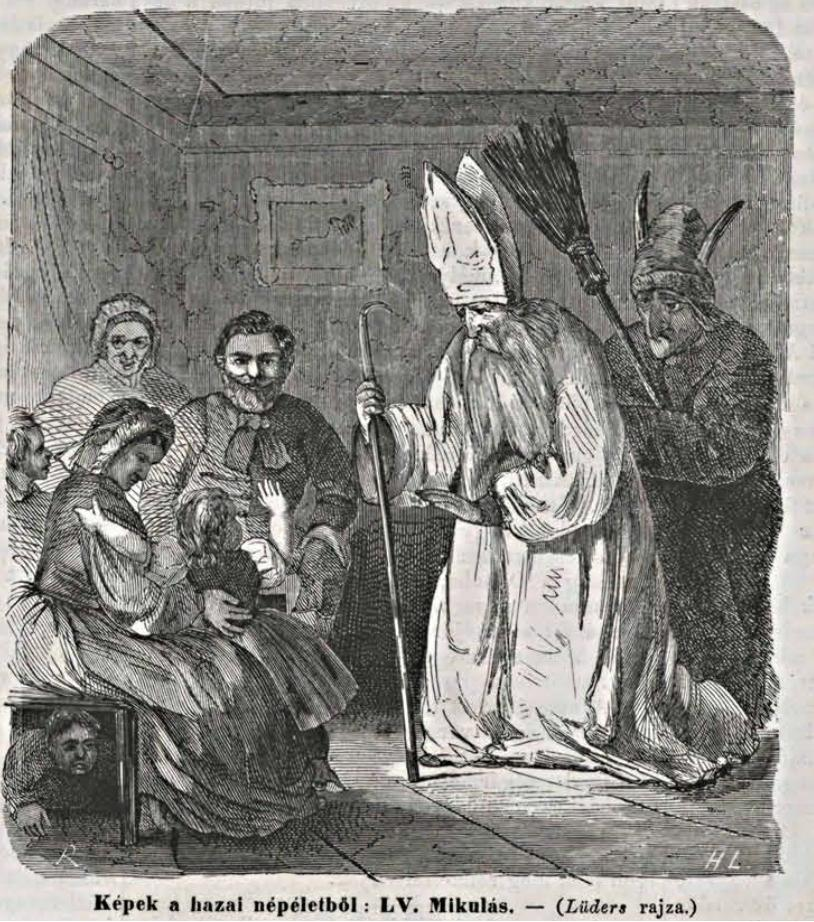
An 1865 illustration of the Hungarian Saint Nicholas (Mikulás) and a Krampusz, a fearful and devilish creature, a mean elf

In Austria, Czechia, southern Germany, Hungary, Slovenia, Slovakia, Romania and Ukraine, Saint Nicholas often comes with two assistants (see companions of Saint Nicholas): a good angel who gives out presents to good children and a devil or a half-goat, half-demon monster in some legends (Krampus or Knecht Ruprecht in Austria and Germany). The latter scares bad children into being good.

On Saint Nicholas Day, they come to the houses where small children live and give them some presents or leave them in shoes that have been left out overnight. While nice children receive various fruits, candies and toys, naughty children can expect nothing more than a wooden switch, several pieces of coal or a carrot or potatoes left by a devil.

Treats are traditionally sweets, chocolate, candy, and various nuts, or szaloncukor in Hungary, Romania, and Slovakia. In modern times, chocolate Saint Nicholas figures are most common. In Austria, Hungary and Romania, to get the presents, the boots must be polished, because Saint Nicholas does not fill boots that are not shiny enough.

Although presents are usually given to children by parents, it is not uncommon in some countries for adults to place small surprises into the boots of other adults or to hand them a small wrapped present that day. In Hungary, this tradition is known as megajándékoz valakit valamivel: “gift somebody with something”.

== Virgács ==
The virgács is a switch resembling a small broom, made with twigs or branches from a bush or willow tree, often painted gold. They are sold on the streets in Hungary before Saint Nicholas Day.

== See also ==
- Christmas traditions
- Santa Claus
- Saint Nicholas
