= List of Christmas and winter gift-bringers =

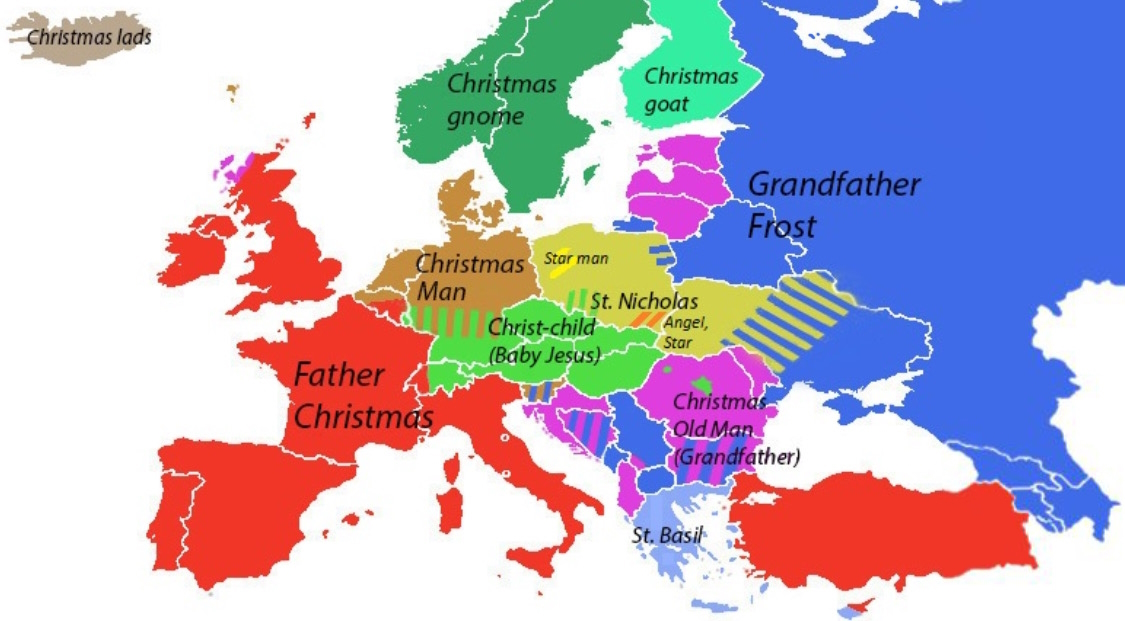
Christmas gift-bringers in Europe

This is a list of Christmas and winter gift-bringer figures from around the world.

The history of mythical or folkloric gift-bringing figures who appear in winter, often at or around the Christmas period, is complex, and in many countries the gift-bringer – and the gift-bringer's date of arrival – has changed over time as native customs have been influenced by those in other countries. While many though not all gift-bringers originated as religious figures, gift-bringing is often now a non-religious custom and secular figures exist in many countries that have little or no tradition of celebrating Christmas as a religious festival. Some figures are entirely local, and some have been deliberately and more recently invented.

The main originating strands – all of which have their roots in Europe – are

- the overlapping winter-based and religious Old Man traditions (Saint Nicholas, Santa Claus, Father Christmas, Saint Basil, Grandfather Frost),
- the Christ Child traditions promoted by Martin Luther (Christkind, Baby Jesus, Child God), and
- the Three Kings traditions.

Not all gift-bringers were or are specifically focused on Christmas Eve or Christmas Day: other common customs are 6 December (Saint Nicholas), 1 January, New Year (St Basil, or secular), and 6 January, Epiphany (Three Kings).

The international popularity of the figure of Santa Claus has transformed the older traditions of many countries.

== List of gift-bringers ==
Nation	Old man	Child	Other	Notes
Albania	Babagjyshi, Babagjyshi i Krishtlindjeve (Grandfather Christmas, Old Man of Christmas), Babadimri (Grandfather Frost)			
Argentina	Papá Noel (Father Christmas)	El Niño Dios (Child God)	Reyes Magos (The Three Wise Men)	
Australia	Santa Claus; Bubaa Gaadha (in Gamilaraay)		Wangkarnal Crow (in Warmun, Western Australia)	
Austria	Saint Nikolaus or Nikolo	Christkind (Christ Child)		
Belgium	Kerstman (Christmas Man) and Sinterklaas for Dutch speakers; Père Noël (Father Christmas) and Saint Nicolas for French speakers	Le Petit Jesus (Baby Jesus) for French speakers		
Brazil	Papai Noel, Bom Velhinho (Good Little Oldie).			
Canada	Santa Claus, Père Noël (Father Christmas) for French speakers			
Chile	Viejito Pascuero ("Little Easter Old Man")			The name comes from Pascua (Easter) being used in Chile to refer to multiple religious holidays, Christmas included.
China	Shengdan laoren (Traditional Chinese: 聖誕老人, Simplified Chinese: 圣诞老人, Cantonese: sing daan lo jan, pinyin: shèngdànlǎorén (Old Man Christmas)			
Colombia	Papá Noel (Father Christmas)	El Niño Dios (Child God), El Niño Jesús (Child Jesus)		
Costa Rica	Santa Clós (Santa Claus), San Nicolás (Saint Nicholas) or his nickname Colacho.	El Niño Dios (Child God)		
Croatia	Djed Božićnjak (Grandfather Christmas), Sveti Nikola (Saint Nicholas) 6 December	Mali Isus (Baby Jesus)	In Dalmatia and Slavonia, Saint Lucy arrives on the eve of her feast day, 13 December.	
Czech Republic	Angel and devil accompanying Svatý Mikuláš (St Nicholas) 6 December	Ježíšek (Baby Jesus)		
Denmark	Julemanden (Christmas Man)			
Dominican Republic	Papá Noel (Father Christmas), Santa Clós (Santa Claus)		Los Tres Reyes Magos (The Three Kings), Vieja Belén (Old Lady of Bethlehem)	
Ecuador	Papá Noel (Father Christmas)	El Niño Dios (Child God)	The Three Kings	
England	Father Christmas or synonymously Santa Claus			Before mid-Victorian times Father Christmas was a different folkloric figure representing good cheer, and did not bring gifts.
Finland			Joulupukki (Yule Goat)	
France	Le Père Noël (Father Christmas); Saint Nicolas (Saint Nicholas) in Alsace, Lorraine, the Ardennes, Franche-Comté and the Low Countries, 6 December; Olentzero in the Basque Country; Saint Martin in Alsace, Franconian Lorraine and Maritime Flanders, 10 or 11 November; Le Père Janvier (Father January) in Burgundy, Nivernais and Bourbonnais, 31 December - 1 January; Saint Vincent in the Langres plateau	Le Petit Jésus (Child Jesus); Le Christkindel (Christkind) in Alsace and Franconian Lorraine, 6 December	Tante Arie (Aunt Arie, a fairy) in the County of Montbéliard; Les Rois Mages (The Three Kings) in Roussillon; Berchta in Alsace	
Germany	Martinsmann, 10 November in Protestant areas, 11 November in Catholic areas; Nikolaus, 6 December; Weihnachtsmann (Christmas Man), 24 December in Protestant areas	Christkind (Christ Child), 24 December in Catholic areas		Nikolaus is accompanied by Knecht Ruprecht, Krampus, Belsnickel or other servants in some regions of Germany.
Greece	Άγιος Βασίλειος ο Μέγας (Saint Basil the Great)			
Honduras	Santa Claus		The Three Kings	
Hungary	Télapó (Father Christmas); Mikulás (Nicholas)	Jézuska or Kis Jézus (Child Jesus)	Angels accompanying the baby Jesus	Mikulás is accompanied by krampusz, generally bringing virgács (rod for whipping) to children who did not behave well
Iceland			Jólasveinar (Yulemen or Yule Lads)	In Icelandic folk tales there are numerous Jólasveinar, which come on different dates.
India	English: Santa Claus, Father Christmas; Hindi: सांता क्लॉज़ (saanta kloz), सैंट निकोलस (saint nikolas); Other languages: Several names (Note: চান্টাক্লজ (Assamese), সান্তা ক্লজ (Bengali), सांता क्लॉज (Bhojpuri), सांता क्लॉज (Dogri), सांता क्लॉज (Goan Konkani), સાન્તા ક્લોસ (Gujarati), ಸಾಂಟಾ ಕ್ಲಾಸ್ (Kannada), सांता क्लॉज (Maithili), ക്രിസ്മസ് പാപ്പാ (Malayalam, lit. 'Papa Christmas'), ꯁꯥꯟꯇꯥ ꯀ꯭ꯂꯖ꯫ (Manipuri), सांताक्लॉज (Marathi), सान्टा क्लाउज (Nepali), ସାଣ୍ଟା କ୍ଲଜ୍ (Odia), ਸੈਂਟਾ ਕਲੌਸ (Punjabi), सांता क्लॉज (Sanskrit) சாண்டா கிளாஸ் (Tamil), శాంతా క్లాజు (Telugu), سانتا کلاز (Urdu))			
Iran	Santa Claus, Baba Noel (Persian: بابا نوئل); Amu Nowruz (Persian: عمو نوروز, "Uncle Nowruz")			
Ireland	Santa Claus, Father Christmas, Daidí na Nollag for Irish speakers			
Italy	Babbo Natale (Father Christmas)	Gesù Bambino (Baby Jesus)	La Befana 6 January. In Sicily, Udine, Bergamo, Brescia, Cremona, Lodi, Mantova, Piacenza, Parma, Reggio Emilia, Verona and Western Trentino, Saint Lucy arrives on the eve of her feast day, 13 December.	
Japan	Santa Kurōsu (サンタクロース) or Santa-san (サンタさん)		On 2 Jan the Seven Lucky Gods bring metaphorical treasures in their treasure ship Takarabune	
Latvia	Ziemassvētku Vecītis (Father Christmas)			
Lebanon	بابا نويل (Baba Noel), Père Noël			
Lithuania	Kalėdų Senelis (Grandfather Christmas)			
Luxembourg	Kleeschen (Saint Nicholas)	Christkind (Christ Child)		
Malta	Father Christmas (Missier il-Milied in Maltese)			
Mexico	Santa Claus	El Niño Dios (Child God)	Los Tres Reyes Magos (The Three Kings)	
Netherlands	Kerstman (Christmas Man), Sinterklaas (Saint Nicholas)			Zwarte Piet (Black Peter), accompanies Sinterklaas
New Zealand	Santa Claus, Hana Kōkō (in Māori)			
Nicaragua		El Niño (The Child)	The Three Kings	
Norway	Julenissen (Santa Claus)			
Panama	Santa Claus	Christ Child	The Three Kings 6 January	
Peru	Papá Noel (Father Christmas), Santa Claus			
Philippines	Santa Claus, Santa Klaus (in Tagalog)		Los Tres Reyes Magos, Tatlóng Haring Mago (The Three Kings), 5 January	
Poland	Gwiazdor (Star Man or Little Star), Santa Claus, Święty Mikołaj (Saint Nicolas) 6 December	Dzieciątko (Christ Child) in Upper Silesia	Aniołek (Angel) 24 December in Kraków	
Portugal	Pai Natal (Father Christmas), Santa Claus	Menino Jesus (Christ Child)		
Puerto Rico	Santa Clós (Santa Claus)		Los Tres Reyes Magos (The Three Kings)	
Romania	Moș Crăciun (Old Man Christmas, Christmas Old Man, Grandfather Christmas, Christmas Grandfather), Moș Nicolae (Saint Nicholas)	Jézuska or Kis Jézus (Child Jesus) (for the Hungarian minorities)	Angyal (The Angel) (for the Hungarian minorities)	Moș Gerilă (Grandfather Frost, Old Man Frost) during the previous Communist era
Russia	Дед Мороз (Ded Moroz) (Grandfather Frost)	Snegurochka (the Snow Maiden and granddaughter of Ded Moroz) and the New Year Boy		Before 1917, during the pre-Communist era, the gift-bringers were Saint Nicholas, Baboushka and Kolyáda
Slovakia	Angel and Devil accompanying Svätý Mikuláš (Saint Nicholas) 6 December	Ježiško (Baby Jesus)		
Slovenia	Miklavž (Saint Nicholas), Dedek Mraz (Grandpa Frost), Božiček (Santa Claus)	Jezušček (Baby Jesus)	Sveti Trije kralji (The Three Kings)	
South Africa	In English: Santa Claus Father Christmas, Santa Claus			
Spain	Papá Noel or Santa Claus (Father Christmas); Pare Noel or Pare Nadal in Catalonia; Olentzero in the Basque Country and Navarre; Apalpador in Galicia; Anguleru in Asturias; Esteru in Cantabria.		The Three Kings 6 January; Tió de Nadal in Catalonia; Anjanas in Cantabria; Mari Domingi, a recent female companion for Olentzero in the Basque Country and Navarre.	
Sweden	Jultomten (Christmas Gnome)			Julbock (Christmas Goat) until the 19th century
Switzerland	St Nicholas (known as Samichlaus to German-speakers and San Nicolao to Italian), Père Noël (Father Christmas) for French-speakers	Christkind (Christ Child) in some areas, Gesù Bambino (Baby Jesus) in Italian-speaking areas	La Befana in Italian-speaking areas	
Uruguay	Papá Noel (Father Christmas)	El Niño Dios (Child God)	Los Reyes Magos on 6 January	
United States	Santa Claus; sometimes Kris Kringle; ᏗᎭᏄᎧᎯ (in Cherokee); Kanakaloka (in Hawaiian);			
Venezuela	San Nicolás (Saint Nicholas)	El Niño (The Child)	Reyes Magos (The Three Wise Men)	
Wales	Father Christmas, Santa Claus; Siôn Corn in Welsh (literally Chimney John)			

== See also ==
- Christmas traditions
- Santa Claus

== Bibliography ==
- Bowler, Gerry (2000). The World Encyclopedia of Christmas. Toronto: McClelland & Stewart Ltd. ISBN 0-7710-1531-3.
