= Christkind =

Christmas gift-bringer

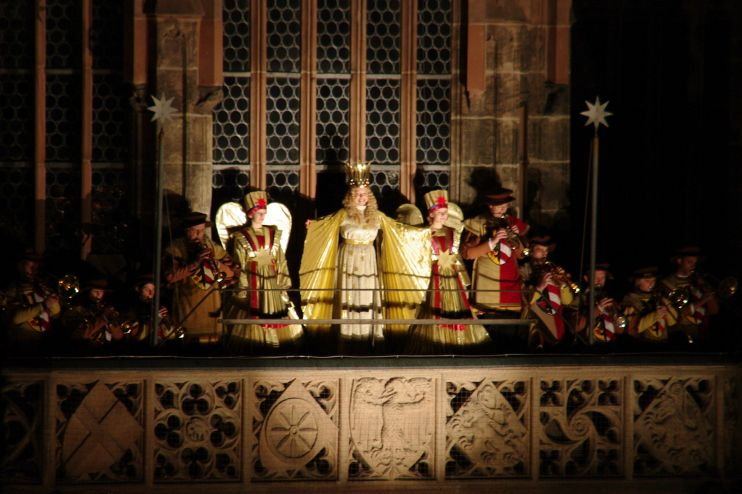
Opening of the Christkindlesmarkt in Nuremberg by the Christkind

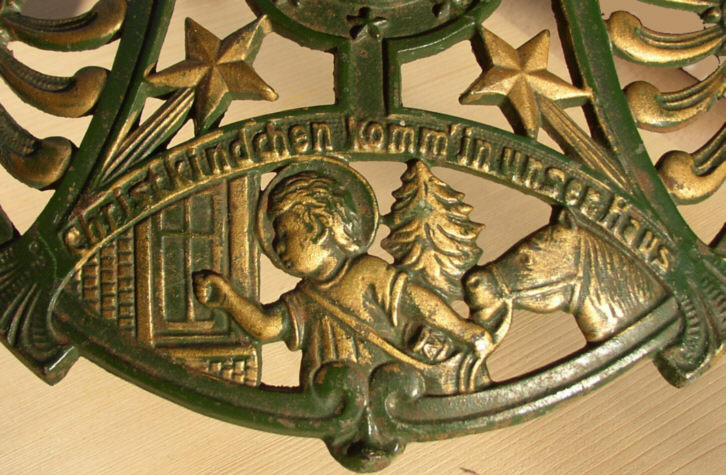
Christkind

The Christkind (German for 'Christ-child'; pronounced [ˈkʁɪstˌkɪnt]), also called Christkindl, is the traditional Christmas gift-bringer in Austria, Switzerland, Liechtenstein, Luxembourg, Southern Germany and Western Germany, parts of northeastern France (Alsace), the Czech Republic, Slovakia, Slovenia, Croatia, the eastern part of Belgium, Portugal, Hungary, Upper Silesia in Poland, parts of Latin America, in certain areas of southern Brazil, and in the Acadiana region of Louisiana.

Christkind is called in Portuguese Menino Jesus ('boy Jesus'), in Hungarian Jézuska ('little Jesus'), in Slovak Ježiško ('little Jesus'), in Czech Ježíšek ('little Jesus'), in Latin America Niño Dios ('child God') or Niño Jesús ('child Jesus') and in Croatian Isusek ('little Jesus'), in Silesian Dziyciōntko Jezus ('baby Jesus'), in Cieszyn Silesian Aniołek ('little Angel'), in Polish Dzieciątko ('little baby'). In some parts of Italy, the analogous figure of the Christkind is known as Gesù Bambino ('child Jesus').

== History ==
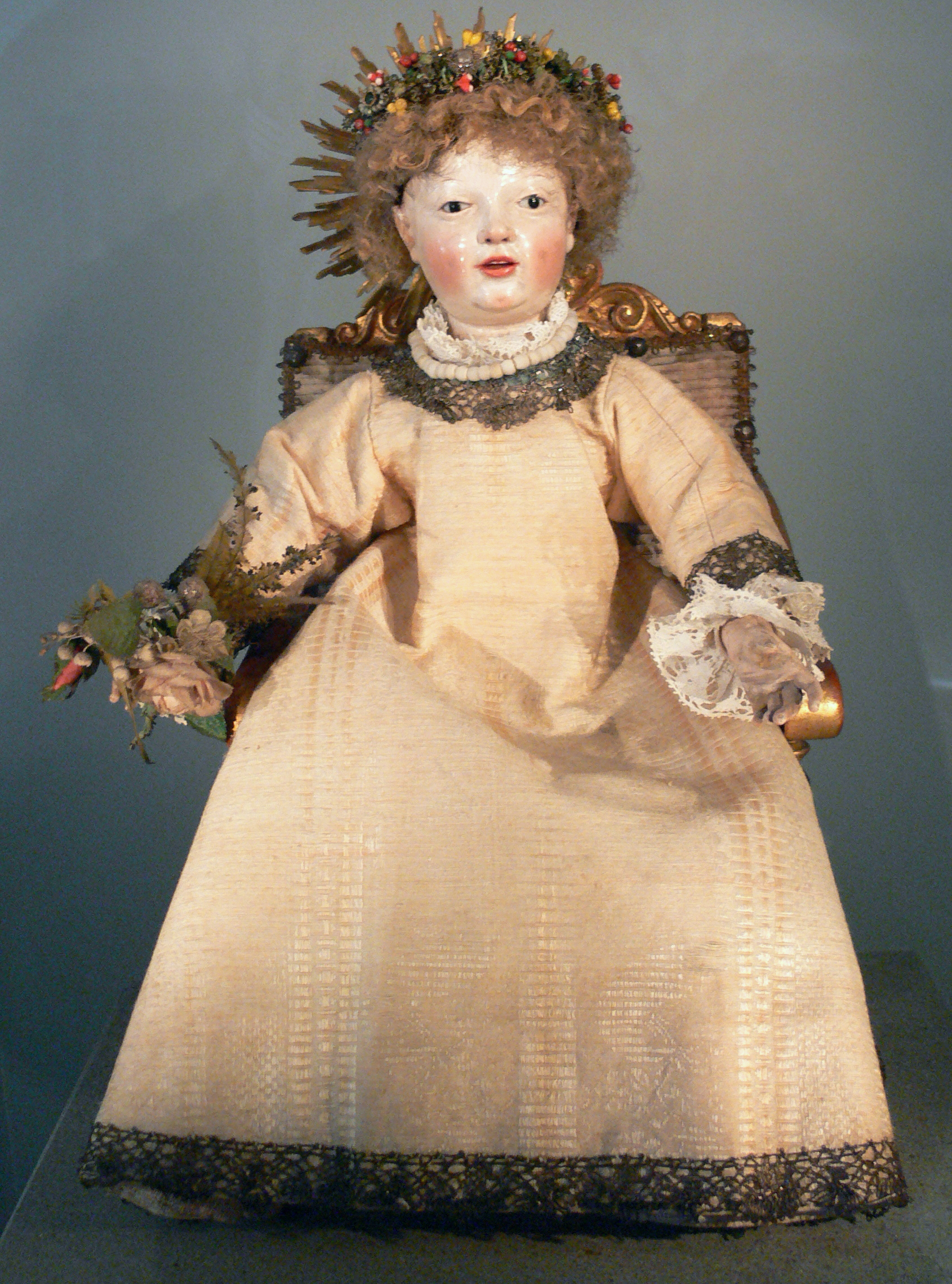
Christkind, Munich, Germany

Promulgated by Martin Luther at the Protestant Reformation in 16th–17th-century Europe to discourage the Catholic devotion of saints such as Saint Nicholas, many Protestants adopted this gift bringer, the Christ Child or Christkindl, and the date of giving gifts changed from December 6 to Christmas Eve. As such, the "Lutheran Church promoted Christ as the children's gift-giver, hoping to draw attention to the child for whom Christmas was named." The Christkind was adopted in Catholic areas of Germany during the 19th century. To this date, the Christkindl "remains the main gift bringer in many Catholic countries in Latin America."

The Christkind is a sprite-like child, usually depicted with blond hair and angelic wings. Martin Luther intended it to be a reference to the incarnation of Jesus as an infant (see Christ Child). Sometimes the Christ Child is, instead of the infant Jesus, interpreted as a specific angel bringing the presents, as it appears in some processions together with an image of little Jesus Christ. Later, the Christkind was said to make rounds delivering gifts with St. Nicholas.

Children never see the Christkind in person, and parents tell them that Christkind will not come and bring presents if they are curious and try to spot it. The family enters the living room, where the Christmas tree has been put up, for the opening of presents (the Bescherung), when the parents say that they think that the Christkind who has brought the presents has now left again. In some traditions, the departure is announced by the ringing of a small bell, which the parents pretend to have heard or which is secretly done by one of the adults in the family.

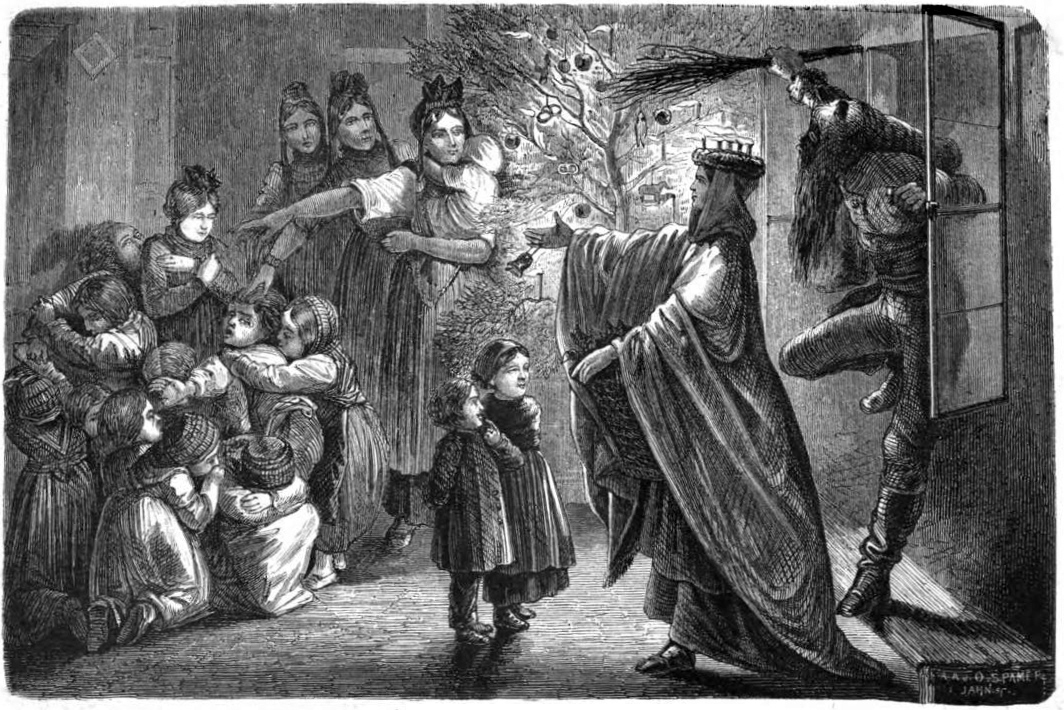
Christkind and Hans Trapp, Alsace. —Woodcut. Atelier of Otto Spamer, signed Jahn. pub. 1863 (Note: Cf. similar illustration in Harper's magazine 1873.)

In 19th century Alsace (then German territory of Elsaß), the Christchild was impersonated by a woman dressed in white, wearing a crown crafted from gold paper, holding up a circle of lit candles. She would be accompanied by the frightful, black-faced Hans Trapp (cf. image right) which was a character inspired by Hans von Dratt or Tratten (Hans von Trotha), 15th century lord of Bärbelstein (Burg Berwartstein) in the Palatinate, who developed a terrible reputation as oppressor of the people.

In the 19th century area of Swabia, the Christkind dressed as a white-clad angel would have the Pelzmärte (var. Pelzmichel, Buzegraale, Belsnickel) as companion, even though this figure would have made an earlier appearance during the Knöpflinsnächte (var. of Anklopfnächte; "Knocking Nights"); the Pelzmärte[l] would be covered in pea straw, have a soot-blackened face, wear a chain around his waist, and hold a staff in hand, carrying a basket on his back. In some places, he would wear a fur muzzle and carry a bell. Among the lower Bohemian populace, the Christkind was tagged along by the Rumpanz.

The Christmas gift-bringer Knecht Ruprecht was alternatively called de hele Christ ("the Holy Christ") in the Mittelmark area (now Brandenburg), suggesting a conflation with the Christkind.

Since the 1990s, the Christkind has faced increasing competition from the Weihnachtsmann, caused by the use of the American version of Santa Claus as an advertising figure. Many traditionalist Catholics in recent times have advocated for the tradition of the Christkind as a "beautiful means of restoring the true meaning of Christmas".

Christkindl or Christkindel are diminutive versions of Christkind. Christkind and Belsnickel are also found among communities of Volga German descent in Argentina. A well-known figure is the Christkind at the Christkindlesmarkt in Nuremberg, which is represented by a young woman chosen every two years for this task.

Christkindl is also a part of the city of Steyr in Austria, named after the allegedly miraculous wax statue of Christkind in the town church.

== Czech Ježíšek ==
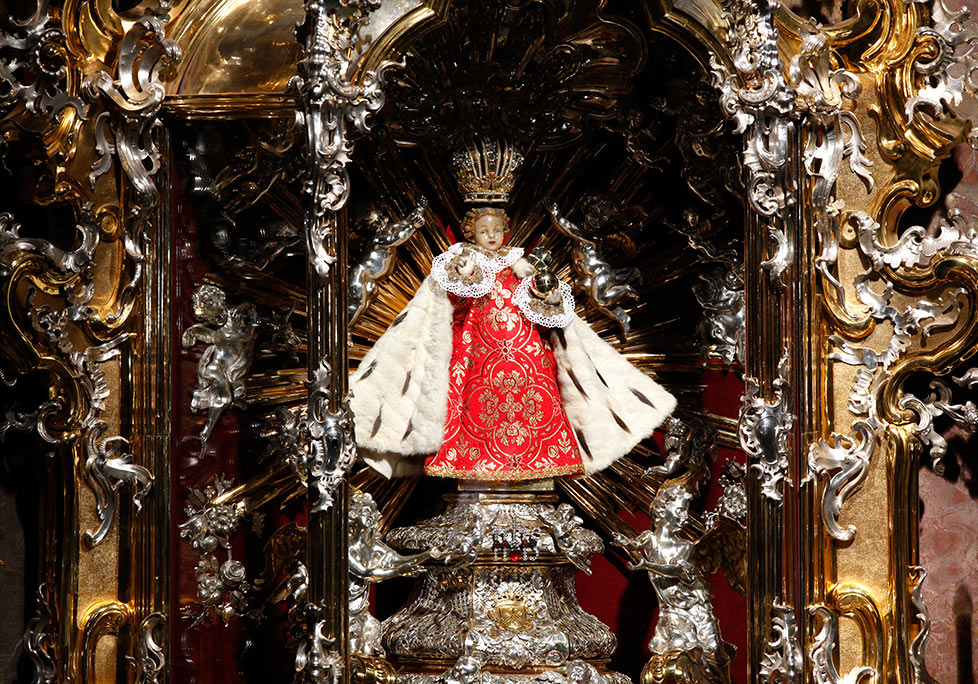
The statue of the Infant Jesus of Prague, given by Princess Polyxena of Lobkowicz to the Discalced Carmelites in 1628

Ježíšek (the Baby Jesus) is the Czech-language name for the Christkind Christmas figure. There is no accurate description of Ježíšek. He has been depicted as a baby, toddler, and young lad. Some even consider him simply as an abstract figure. According to tradition, Ježíšek makes his appearance on Christmas Eve. In some families, Ježíšek brings the Christmas tree and the gifts. In other families, the Christmas tree is decorated collaboratively with the children. Christmas gifts are delivered by Ježíšek and unboxed on Christmas Eve (24 December) by the children.

The tradition of Ježíšek has been observed by the Czechs for more than 400 years. This is partly due to the large population of Catholics during that period. It was Martin Luther who coined the term during the 16th century, an attempt to provide a suitable name to their figure other than St. Nicholas.

At present, belief in Ježíšek is upheld in modern Czech society, despite having the lowest rates of religious affiliation in the world.

== La Christine in Acadiana ==
La Christine (also found in the forms La Christiane and La Crisquine) is the Cajun French name for a folkloric figure who traditionally brought "fruits, homemade candies and small gifts" on New Year's Eve. The name represents a Gallicized form of "Christkind" and the tradition was most likely brought to the area by German-speaking settlers from Switzerland. In some families, La Christine would make a visit a week after Papa Noël brought Christmas gifts and might even be described as "Santa Claus' wife", while in others "La Christine" was just another name for Santa Claus.

== See also ==
- Santa Claus
- Sinterklaas
- Father Christmas
- Nikolaus
- Ayaz Ata
- Ded Moroz
- Kris Kringle, an Americanized pronunciation and spelling of Christkindl
- Christkindl Markt, a traditional holiday market in Austria, Switzerland, Germany and Eastern France
- List of Christmas and winter gift-bringers by country
