= Yamal Iri =

Yamal Iri (in Russian Ямал Ири, meaning "Grandfather of Yamal") is a character associated with Christmas in the Yamalo-Nenets Autonomous Okrug, Russia, a counterpart of Ded Moroz and Santa Claus.

The character was introduced in 2007 on an initiative of several tourism organizations of Yamal. His image was based on a contest of children's drawings and works of decorative art. The character was also supplied with a legend, based on traditions of the northern indigenous peoples of Russia.

== Story of Yamal Iri ==
According to legend, Yamal Iri works all year long, travels a lot, and helps people in various ways. Не teaches people to do things right and conducts the ritual ceremony of joining travelers to the Northern Brotherhood in the spot of Arctic Circle stela in Salekhard. Yamal Iri's vestments are done in the national traditions style of the North. His magic rune-covered staff is not his only attribute; he also possesses a drum which he utilizes regularly to conduct his rituals. The drum is made up of reindeer skin and wood, following the ancient Nenets technology. The drum's beetle is made of birch. It is covered by reindeer fur. Its sound is supposed to drive away evil spirits, to give a charge of cheerfulness and positive energy, and bestows chances for good and happiness. He is both gentle in speech, and very self-confident and self-assured in his strength.

== See also ==
- Ded Moroz
