= Moș Gerilă =

Romanian Christmas folkloric character

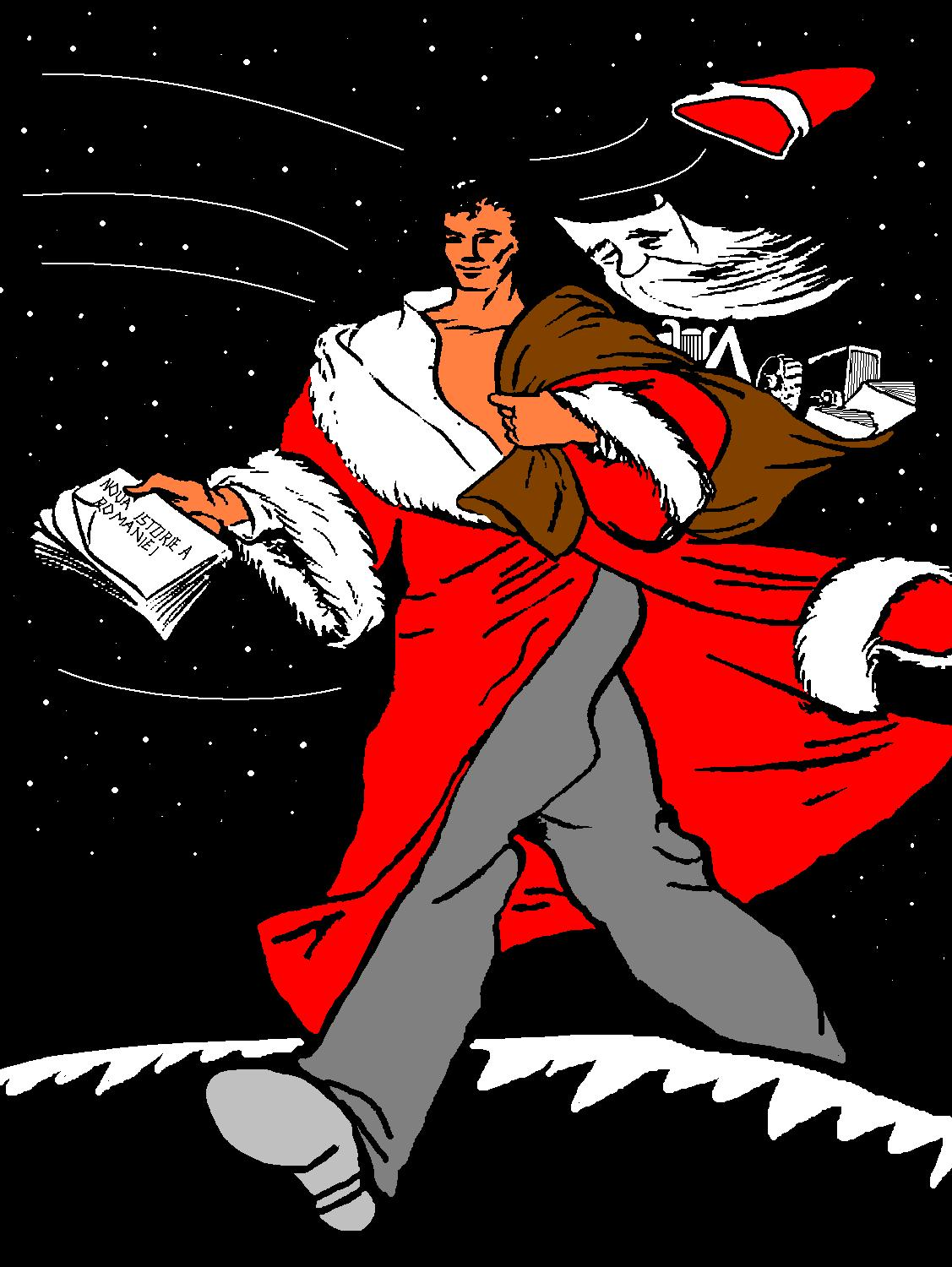
Moș Gerilă depicted in the Romanian communist newspaper Națiunea on December 25, 1947

Moș Gerilă is the name of a character from Romanian folklore and communist propaganda.

== Origin of the name ==
The Romanian word moș means an elder male person. The term ger means "frost" in Romanian. Moș Gerilă's name is a translation of the Russian Ded Moroz and was adopted by the Romanian communists, under influence of the Soviet model, as a new name for Moș Crăciun (Santa Claus).

== Appearance ==
In 1947, the newspaper Națiunea published an illustration of Moș Gerilă as a young, athletic, proletarian, bare-chested man.

== History of the character ==
=== Origins ===
During the period from 1944 to 1948, Romanian Communist Party newspapers tried to denigrate the image of Christmas, emphasizing, for example, the peasant origins of many colinde.

In 1948, after the Communists took power in Romania, the word Crăciun ceased to appear in any article in the newspaper Scînteia. In an article titled "Christmas Dialogue," the new reality was laid out: "Starting this year, Christmas will not be like others — a fact well known to all those who take their bearings from the star that rises every evening in the vast sky over Moscow."

The word Crăciun was considered too religious, and therefore instead of Moș Crăciun, (the Romanian name for Santa Claus), a new character was introduced in the 1950s: Moș Gerilă. Children were told that it was Moș Gerilă who brought gifts each December 25.

In the three years following the installation of the Communists in power, Christmas celebrations were transferred to the New Year, December 30, the day when King Michael of Romania abdicated in 1947, was renamed the Day of the Republic. December 25 and 26 became working days.

=== Decline ===
In the 1980s, the personality cult of "the beloved leader" would leave its imprint on the character of Moș Gerilă. Children's New Year gifts were associated less with Moș Gerilă and more with the state itself, personified by Nicolae Ceaușescu.

After the Romanian Revolution of 1989, Moș Gerilă lost influence and the older character of Moș Crăciun returned.

== See also ==
- Ded Moroz – Christmas figure in eastern Slavic cultures
- Father Christmas – Folkloric figure originating in England
- Jack Frost – Personification of frost and cold weather
- Old Man Winter – Personification of winter
- Santa Claus – Legendary Christmas figure
