= Ded Moroz =

Christmas figure in eastern Slavic cultures

Ded Moroz Дед Мороз
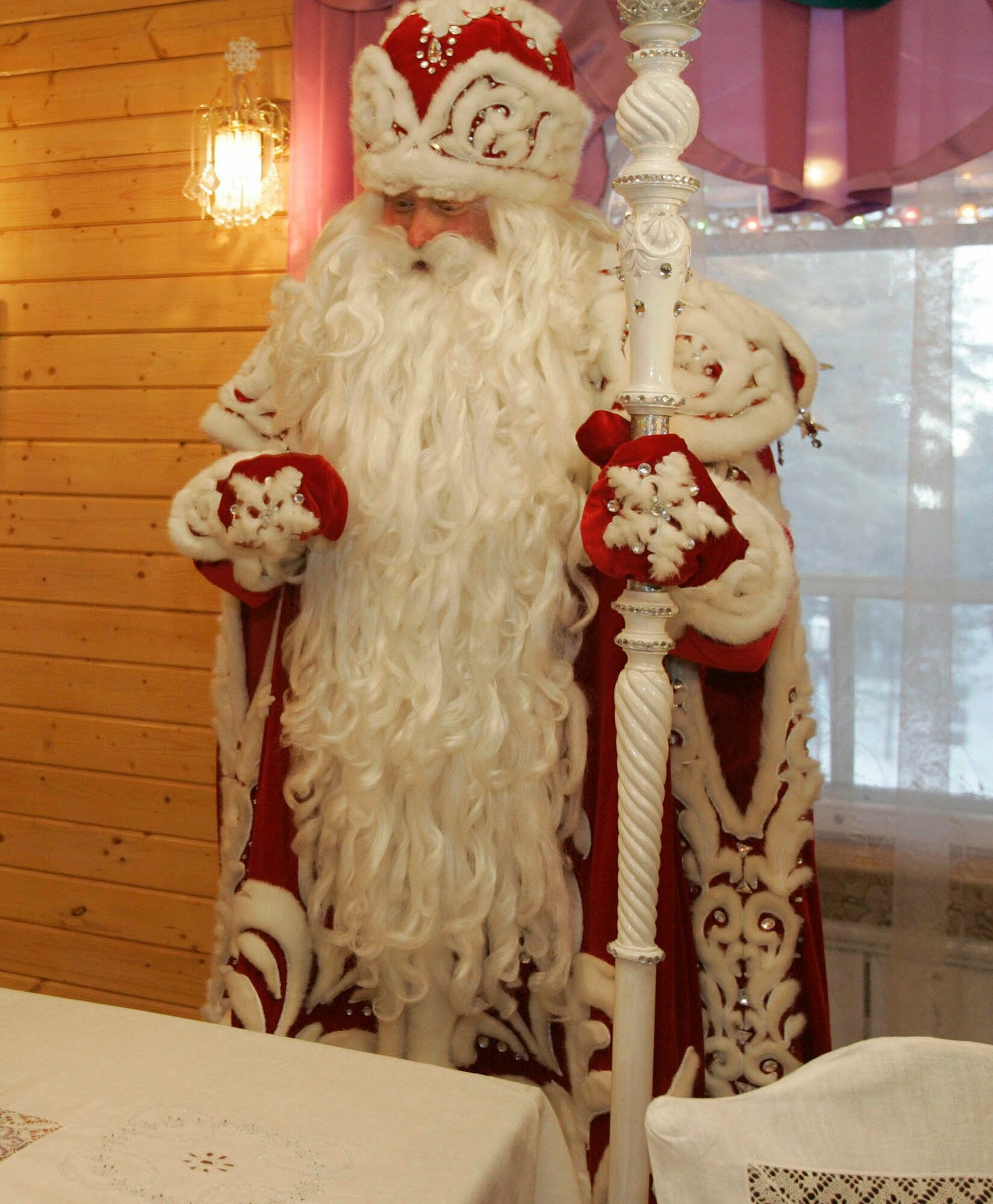
- Ded Moroz from Veliky Ustyug

Creature information
- Other name(s): Morozko, Dzmer Pap, Did Moroz, Şaxta Baba, Dzied Maroz, Dziad Mróz, Died Moraz, Dyeda Mraz, Bobo Barfi, Chykhaan, Ayaz Ata, Kysh Babay
- Similar entities: Santa Claus, Father Christmas and Ayaz Ata
- Family: Snegurochka (Granddaughter)
- Folklore: Russian, Slavic and Eastern European

Origin
- Country: Russia (before: Soviet Union, Russian Empire)
- Region: Northwest Russia, Siberia, Central Russia, Eastern Europe, Caucasus, Central Asia, North Asia, Volga Region, Ural
- Habitat: Northwest Russia

Ded Moroz, (Note: (Russian: Дед Мороз, romanized: Ded Moroz, Russian pronunciation: [dʲet mɐˈros]; Russian diminutive: Russian: Дедушка Мороз, romanized: Dedushka Moroz; Slovak: Dedo Mráz; Polish: Dziadek Mróz; Belarusian: Дзед Мароз, romanized: Dzied Maroz; Ukrainian: Дід Мороз, romanized: Did Moroz; Serbian: Деда Мраз/Deda Mraz; Macedonian: Дедо Мраз; Bulgarian: Дядо Мраз, romanized: Djado Mraz) or Morozko (Russian: Морозко, romanized: Morozko), is a legendary figure similar to Father Christmas and Santa Claus, who has his roots in Slavic mythology. The tradition of Ded Moroz is mostly spread in East Slavic countries and is a significant part of Russian culture. At the beginning of the Soviet era, communist authorities banned Ded Moroz. However, the ban was lifted and he soon became a significant part of Soviet culture. The literal translation of Ded Moroz is Grandfather Frost or Old Man Frost, but traditionally the name is translated as Father Frost.

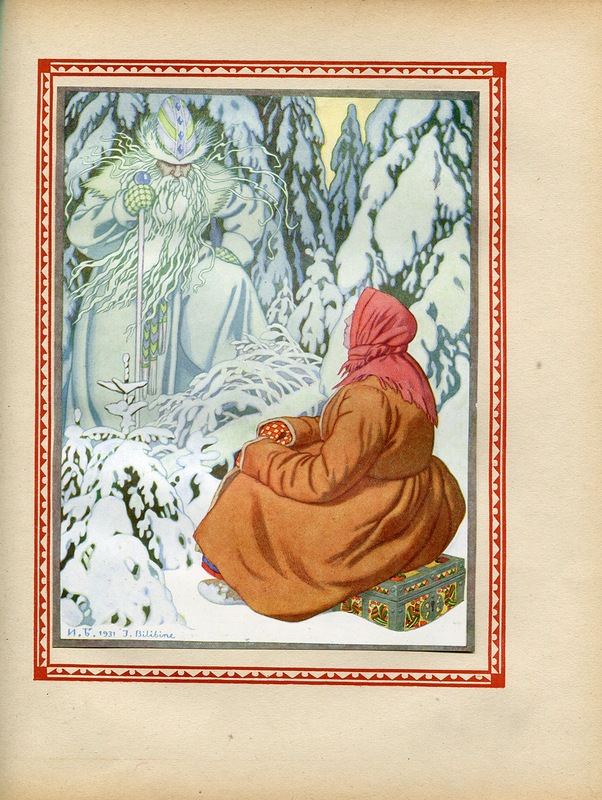
Morozko by Ivan Bilibin

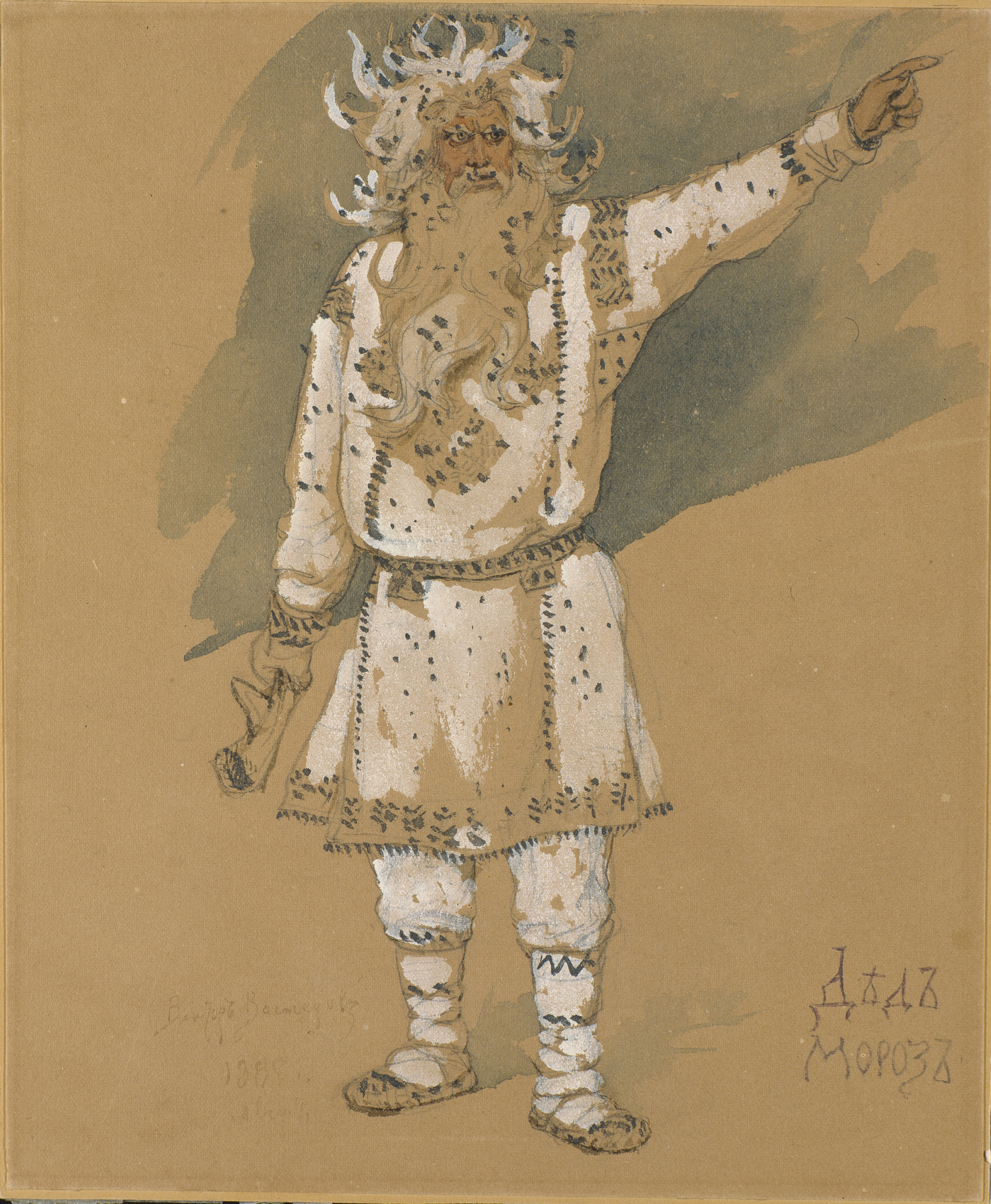
Viktor Vasnetsov: Ded Moroz 1885. A sketch of the costume for "The Snow Maiden"

Ded Moroz wears a heel-length fur coat, in red or blue, a semi-round fur hat, and valenki on his feet. He has a long white beard. He walks with a long magic stick and often rides a troika. He is often depicted bringing presents to well-mannered children, often delivering them in person in the days of December and secretly under the New Year Tree over night on New Year's Eve.

The residence of Ded Moroz in Russia is considered to be the town of Veliky Ustyug, Vologda Oblast. The residence of the Belarusian Dzyed Maroz is said to be in Belavezhskaya Pushcha.

In East Slavic cultures, Ded Moroz is accompanied by Snegurochka (Russian: Снегурочка, Snegurochka; Belarusian: Снягурка, Sniahurka; Ukrainian: Снігуронька, Snihurońka; "Snow Maiden"), his granddaughter and helper.

== Development of the character ==
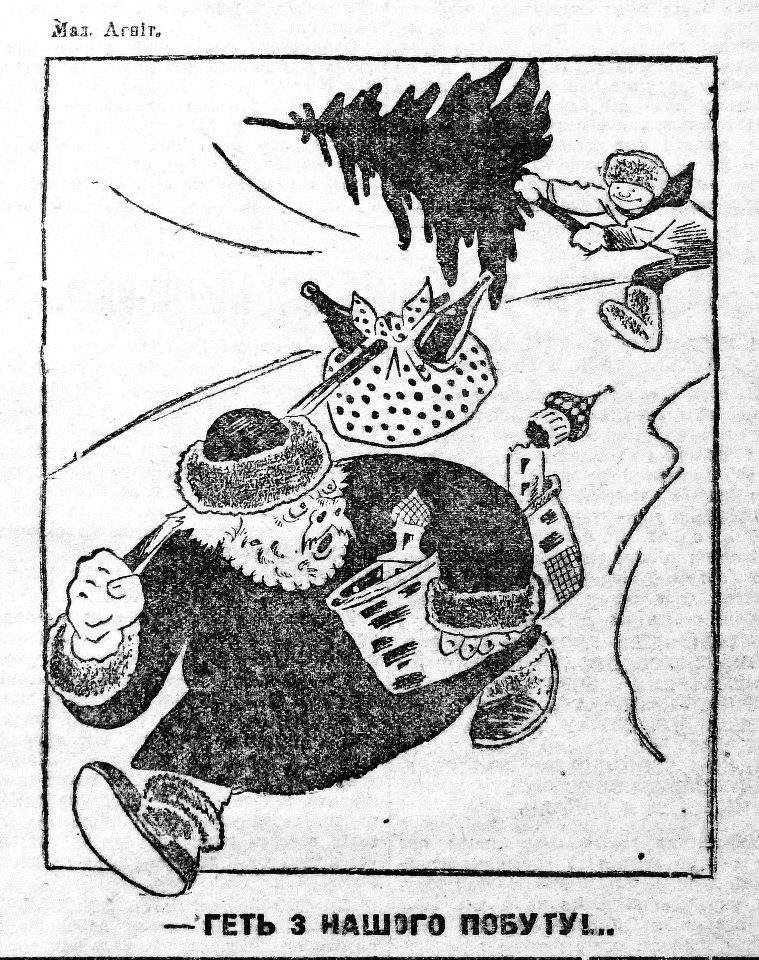
Anti-Ded Moroz Soviet propaganda, 1928

The origins of the character of Ded Moroz predates Christianity as a Slavic personification of winter.

Since the 19th century the attributes and legend of Ded Moroz have been shaped by literary influences, which were also influenced by the Western tradition of Santa Claus. The play The Snow Maiden (named Snegurochka in Russian) by Aleksandr Ostrovsky was influential in this respect, as was Rimsky-Korsakov's The Snow Maiden with libretto based on the play. By the end of the 19th century Ded Moroz became a popular character. The children's tradition of writing letters to Ded Moroz has been known since the end of the 19th century.

Following the Russian Revolution, Christmas traditions were actively discouraged because they were considered to be "bourgeois and religious". Similarly, in 1928 Ded Moroz was declared "an ally of the priest and kulak". Nevertheless, the image of Ded Moroz took its current form during Soviet times, becoming the main symbol of the New Year's holiday (Novy God) that replaced Christmas. Some Christmas traditions were revived following the famous letter by Pavel Postyshev, published in Pravda on 28 December 1935. Postyshev believed that the origins of the holiday, which were pre-Christian, were less important than the benefits it could bring to Soviet children.

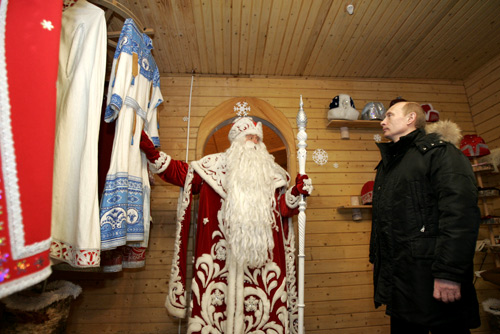
Vladimir Putin, President of the Russian Federation visiting Ded Moroz' residence in Veliky Ustyug on 7 January 2008

== In modern Russia ==
Ded Moroz is very popular in modern Russia. In 1998, the town of Veliky Ustyug in Vologda Oblast, Russia was declared the home of the Russian Ded Moroz by Yury Luzhkov, then Mayor of Moscow. Between 2003 and 2010, the post office in Veliky Ustyug received approximately 2,000,000 letters from within Russia and from all over the world for Ded Moroz. On 7 January 2008, then President Putin of the Russian Federation visited Ded Moroz' residence in the town of Veliky Ustyug as part of the Russian Orthodox Christmas Eve celebration.

The western Santa Claus made inroads in the Russian Federation during the "turbulent" 1990s when Western culture increased its penetration into the post-Soviet Russia. The resurgence of Russia in the early 21st century brought about a renewed emphasis on the basic Slavic character of Ded Moroz. This included the Russian Federation and subordinate governments sponsoring courses about Ded Moroz every December, with the aim of establishing appropriate Slavic norms for Ded Moroz and Snegurochka ("Snow Maiden" – Ded Moroz' granddaughter) roles for the New Year holiday. People playing Ded Moroz and Snegurochka now typically make appearances at children's parties during the winter holiday season, distributing presents and fighting off the wicked witch, Baba Yaga, who children are told wants to steal the gifts.

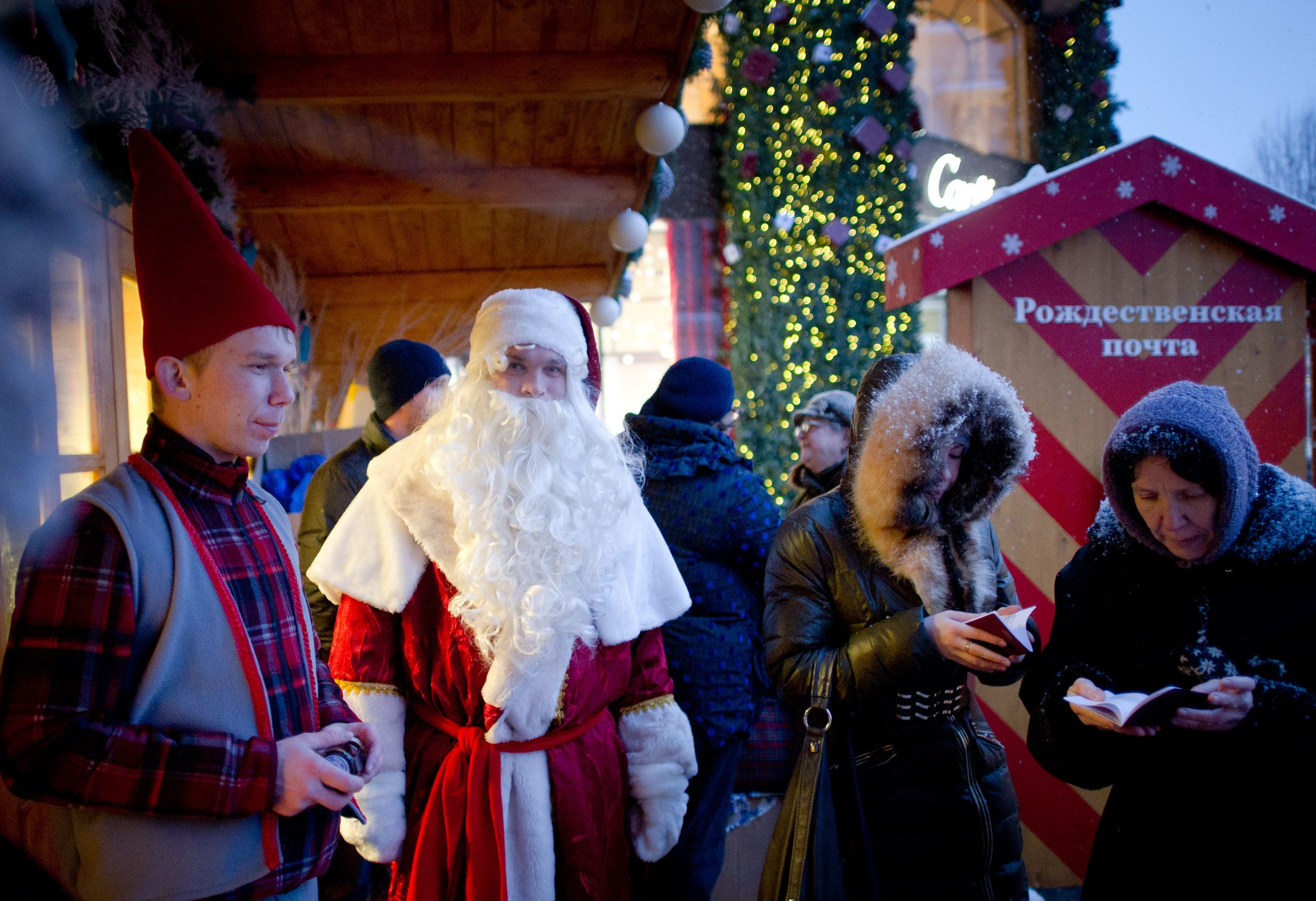
Ded Moroz at the GUM-fair

In November and December 2010, Ded Moroz was one of the candidates in the running for consideration as a mascot for the 2014 Winter Olympics in Sochi, Russia.

=== Variations of Ded Moroz in ethnic minority groups of Russia ===
Many ethnic minorities have for linguistic reasons other names for Ded Moroz or even have their own culture-equivalent counterparts to Ded Moroz. For example, in Bashkir Ded Moroz is known as Ҡыш бабай, Qïš babay, lit. 'Winter Old Man'), in Tatar it has the similar spelling Кыш бабай, Qış Babay with the same meaning. In Nenets he is known as Yamal Iri ("Grandfather of Yamal"). The Yakut indigenous people have their own counterpart to Ded Moroz, which is called Chys Khaan ("Master of Cold").

=== International relations of Ded Moroz ===
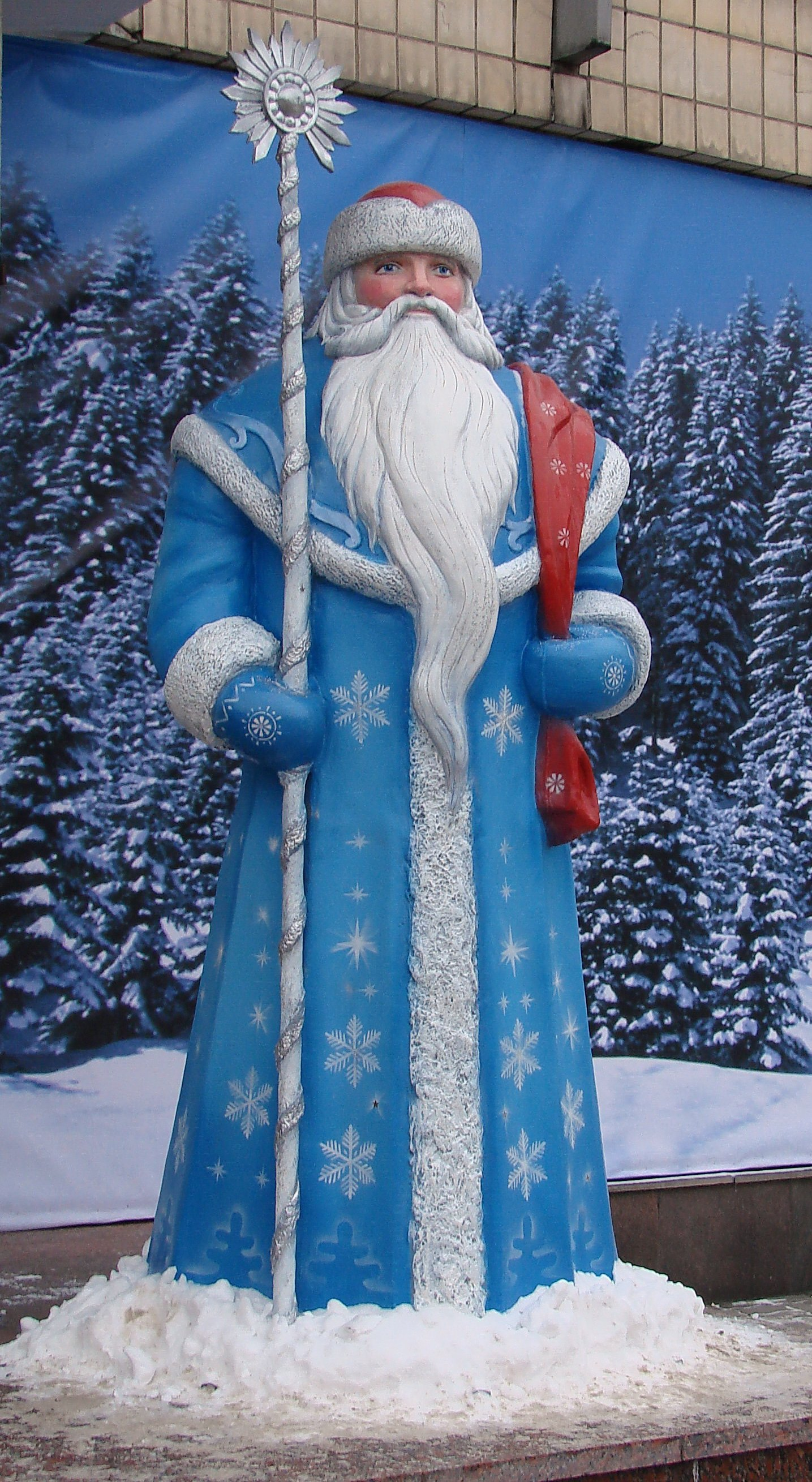
Ded Moroz sculpture

Ded Moroz, and on occasion the Belarusian Dzied Maroz, are presented in the media as being in on-going détente with various counterparts from other cultures, such as the Estonian Santa Claus (Jõuluvana or "Old man of Yule"), the Finnish Santa Claus (Joulupukki or "Yule Goat"), and other Santa Claus, Father Christmas, and Saint Nicholas figures. The détente efforts portrayed have included one-on-one meetings, group meetings and friendly competitions, such as the annual November Santa Claus championships of Celle, Germany.

=== GLONASS Tracks Ded Moroz ===
In November 2009, for the first time, the Russian Federation offered competition to NORAD Tracks Santa with GLONASS Tracks Ded Moroz, which purports to use GLONASS (the Russian satellite navigation system, comparable to GPS) to track Ded Moroz on New Year's Eve (according to the Gregorian calendar).

The Russian-language website provides "real-time tracking" of Ded Moroz, "news" of Ded Moroz throughout the year, a form to send e-mail to Ded Moroz, photos, videos, streaming audio of Russian songs, poems and verses from children's letters to Ded Moroz, information on Veliky Ustyug in Vologda Oblast (considered to be Ded Moroz's hometown) and opportunities to enter competitions and win prizes.

== Regional differences ==
There are equivalents of Ded Moroz and Snegurochka all over the former USSR, as well as the countries once in the Eastern bloc and in the former Yugoslavia. After the dissolution of the Soviet Union, some of these countries made efforts to move away from Soviet and Russian heritage toward their own ancient traditions.

=== Armenia ===
The Armenian name for Ded Moroz is Dzmer Pap (Armenian: Ձմեռ Պապ), literally Grandfather Winter. His loyal granddaughter Dzyunanushik (Armenian: Ձյունանուշիկ), whose name means Snow Sweetie, or Snow Anush (a popular Armenian female name), is another counterpart of Snegurochka. The tradition was set throughout the times of the Russian Empire after the Russo-Persian War (1826–1828), when Eastern Armenia was joined to Russia according to the 1828 Treaty of Turkmenchay.

For almost 160 years of influence Dzmer Pap and Dzyunanushik have hardly changed their appearance or behavior: they come in red, blue or white winter fur coats and, bringing presents to children, expect them to sing songs or recite poems. They are parts of New Year and Epiphany matinées and shows in Armenia. In recent decades well-off parents have developed a tradition to invite Dzmer Pap and Dzyunanushik to their children.

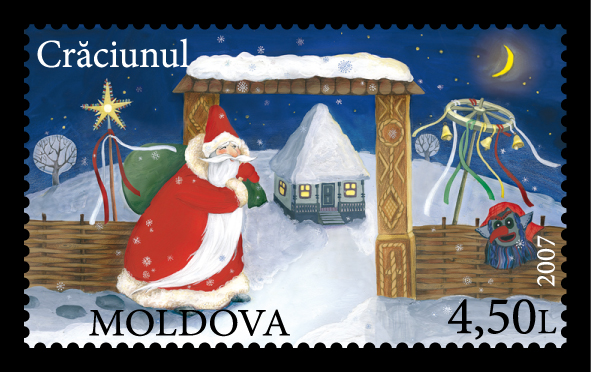
Moldovan stamp featuring Ded Moroz

=== Azerbaijan ===
In Azerbaijan, Ded Moroz is known as Şaxta Baba and Snegurochka as Qar Qızı, with whom Şaxta Baba brings gifts to children at New Year's Eve. Every December, actors playing Şaxta Baba and Qar Qızı stand next to a Christmas tree at Baku Boulevard and other attractions in Baku, giving away presents to and taking pictures with children. Since 2014 however, every actor needs a license costing up to $75. In the predominantly Muslim but secular country, where Christians are a small minority, these traditions and celebrations remain very popular, however the Christian origin is barely to not known at all and they're rather cultural. Şaxta Baba is also an Azerbaijani version of Ayaz Ata, the Ded Moroz of Turkic mythology.

=== Belarus ===
Ded Moroz is Dzied Maroz (Belarusian: Дзед Мароз) in the Belarusian language. He is not a historical folkloric Belarusian character, but was a replacement for Saint Nicholas, known locally as Śviaty Mikałaj, whom Soviet authorities disapproved of because of his Christian origin.

The official residence of Dzied Maroz in Belarus is declared to be in the Białowieża Forest.

=== Bulgaria ===
The Bulgarian name of Santa Claus is Дядо Коледа, Dyado Koleda (Grandfather Koleda), with Дядо Мраз, Dyado Mraz ("Grandfather Frost") being a similar Russian-imported character lacking the Christian connotations and thus popular during Communist rule. However, he has been largely forgotten since 1989, when Dyado Koleda again returned as the more popular figure.

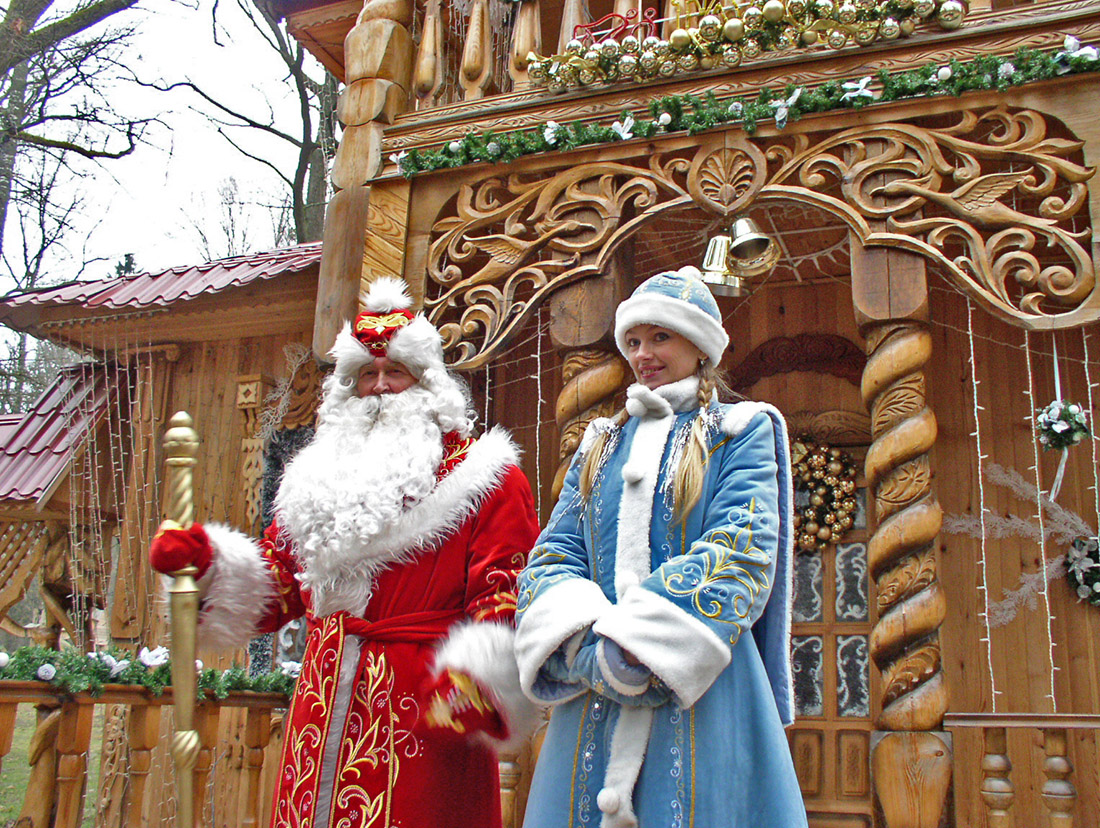
A Ded Moroz in Belarus, alongside a Snegurochka

=== Former Yugoslavia ===
In socialist Yugoslavia (i.e. Bosnia and Herzegovina, Croatia, Montenegro, Macedonia, Serbia, and Slovenia) the character who was said to bring gifts to children was called "Grandfather Frost" (Bosnian: Djeda Mraz; Croatian: Djed Mraz; Macedonian: Дедо Мраз, romanized: Dedo Mraz; Serbian: Деда Мраз, romanized: Deda Mraz; Slovene: Dedek Mraz). He was said to bring gifts for the New Year because public celebration of Christmas was frowned upon during communism.

==== Croatia ====
In Croatia, after the breakup of Yugoslavia, Djed Mraz was promulgated by Christian democratic right-wing media as an example of a "communist creation", therefore Djed Božićnjak (literally: "Grandfather Christmas") was introduced in its stead. Attempts were made in the mass media and advertising to replace Djed Mraz with Djed Božićnjak, despite the two characters not being associated with the same holiday. After 1999 the names of Djed Mraz and Djed Božićnjak became more or less synonymous, including in their use on public television. In some families Djed Mraz is still said to bring gifts at New Year. In Croatia, children also get presents on 6 December. Due to the historical influence of Austrian culture in parts of Croatia, presents are also said to be brought by a traditional figure called Sveti Nikola (Saint Nicholas) who closely resembles Djed Mraz or Djed Božićnjak, except for the fact that he is accompanied by Krampus who takes misbehaving children away, another character from Central European folklore. In some religious families, little Jesus (Isusek, Mali Isus, Kriskindl) is said to brings gifts at Christmas instead of Djed Božićnjak. Also, in some parts of Dalmatia the gifts are brought by Saint Lucy (Sveta Lucija).

==== Slovenia ====
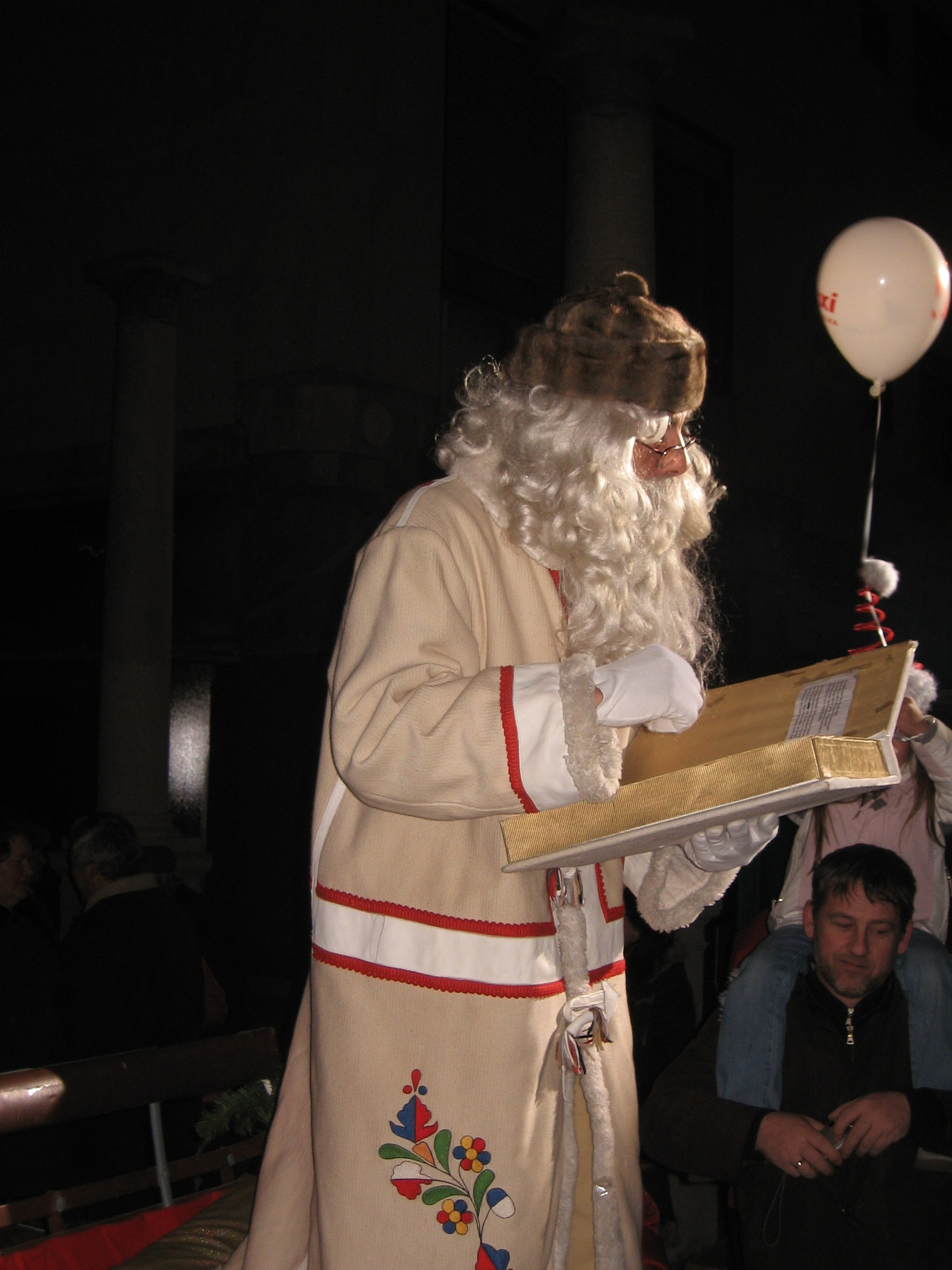
"Dedek Mraz" (Grandpa Frost). Standard Slovenian costume figure designed by Maksim Gaspari (1952).

In Slovenia, the name Ded Moroz was translated from Russian as Dedek Mraz (literally, "Grandpa Frost"). Dedek Mraz is depicted as a slim man wearing a grey leather coat, which has fur inside and is decorated outside, and a round dormouse fur cap. This version of the character is based on traditional imagery, especially as depicted by Maksim Gaspari in images commissioned in 1952. Although the name was translated literally from the Soviet figure, other names for the character were also considered: Sneženi mož ("the Snow Man") and oca Triglav ("Daddy Triglav"). A female figure named babica Zima (Grandma Winter) was also proposed. Initially he was said to live in Siberia, but with the Informbiro crisis and the schism between Yugoslavia and the Soviet Union his home was relocated to Mt. Triglav, Slovenia's (and also Yugoslavia's) highest peak. Public processions featuring the character began in Ljubljana in 1953. The notion of Grandpa Frost was ideologically useful because it served to reorient the December/January holidays away from religion (Saint Nicholas Day and Christmas) and towards the secular New Year. After the ousting of Communism at the beginning of the 1990s, two other "good old men" (as they are currently styled in Slovenian) reappeared in public: Miklavž ("Saint Nicholas") is said to bring presents on 6 December, and Božiček ("Christmas man"; usually depicted as Santa Claus) on Christmas Eve. St. Nicholas has had a strong traditional presence in Slovenian ethnic territory and his feast day remained celebrated in family circles throughout the Communist period. Until the late 1940s it was also said in some areas of Slovenia that Christkind (called Jezušček ("little Jesus") or Božiček) brought gifts on Christmas Eve. Slovenian families have different preferences regarding their gift-giver of choice, according to political or religious persuasion. Slovenian popular culture depicts Grandpa Frost, Saint Nicholas and Santa Claus as friends and has also started blending attributes of the characters, for example, mention of Santa's reindeer is sometimes mingled into the Grandpa Frost narrative at public appearances. Due to his non-religious character and strong institutionalization, Grandpa Frost continues to retain a public presence.

=== Kazakhstan and Kyrgyzstan ===
Ayaz Ata is the Kazakh and Kyrgyz name for Ded Moroz.

=== Mongolia ===
Since the introduction and familiarization of Russian culture during the socialist era, Mongolia has been celebrating the New Year's festivities as a formal holiday. Өвлийн өвгөн, Övliin Övgön (Grandfather Winter) is the Mongolian equivalent of Ded Moroz, who brings children and adults alike gifts on New Year's Eve.

=== Romania ===
In 1948, after the Communists gained power in Romania, it was decided that Christmas should not be celebrated. 25 and 26 December became working days and no official celebrations were to be held. As a replacement for Moş Crăciun (Father Christmas), a new character was introduced, Moş Gerilă (literally "Old Man Frosty", a Romanian language adaptation of the Russian Ded Moroz). He was said to bring gifts to children on 31 December.

Officially, the New Year's Day celebrations began on 30 December, which was named the Day of the Republic, since it was the day when King Mihai I of Romania abdicated in 1947.

After the Romanian Revolution of 1989, Moş Gerilă lost his influence, being replaced by Moş Crăciun.

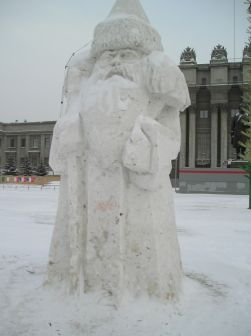
Snow sculpture of Ded Moroz in Samara

=== Sakha Republic ===
Chyskhaan (Yakut: Чысхаан, romanized: Çısxân) is known as the master of cold, accompanied by the Yakut version of Snegurochka, Kharchaana (Yakut: Харчаана, romanized: Xarçâna). He is very similar to Ded Moroz, however a more "East Asian" version of him.

=== Tajikistan ===
In Tajikistan the tradition of Ded Moroz has continued. In Tajik, Ded Moroz is known as Boboi Barfi ("Grandfather Snow"), and Snegurochka is called Barfak ("Snowball").

In 2012, a young man dressed as Ded Moroz was stabbed to death in Dushanbe by a crowd shouting "You infidel!". The murder was motivated by religious hatred, according to the Tajik police.

On 11 December 2013, Saidali Siddiqov, the first deputy head of the Committee for TV and Radio-broadcasting under the Government of Tajikistan, announced in an interview that "Father Frost, his maiden sidekick Snegurochka (Maiden Snow), and New Year's tree will not appear on the state television this year, because these personages and attributes bear no direct relation to our national traditions, though there is no harm in them". However next day this was denounced, and planned celebrations did include these despite objections of some religious figures.

=== Ukraine ===
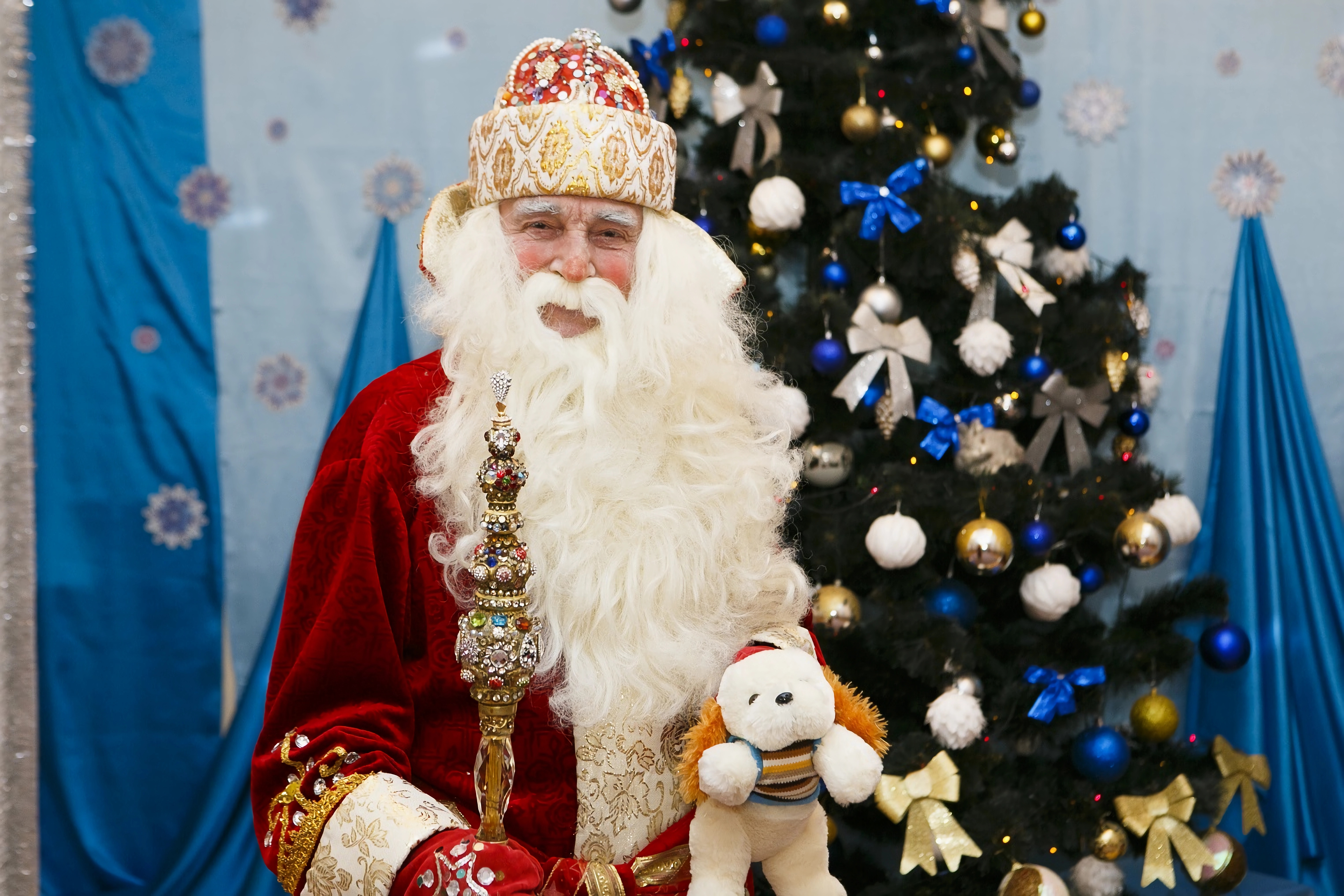
Ukrainian Did Moroz

Since the breakup of the Soviet Union, and especially in recent years, there has been a shift from Ded Moroz (Ukrainian: Дід Мороз), who came to be associated with the Soviet-era heritage, to Saint Nicholas (Ukrainian: Святий Миколай, romanized: Sviatyi Mykolai), who is more popular in Western Ukraine. With the onset of the Russian invasion there were rumors that Ded Moroz imagery was being discouraged by the authorities; however, the Ukrainian Ministry of Culture had denied this.

=== Uzbekistan ===
In 2012 it was reported that Uzbekistan, a largely Muslim nation, moved away from celebrating Christmas. While the celebration of the New Year still remains a notable family event, it is no longer celebrated on a wide national scale, as it was during the times of the Soviet Union, and Ded Moroz, while not being banned, was removed from Uzbek TV channels. This decision was met with mixed reception. Some say that traditions are not for the government to decide upon, whereas more orthodox Muslims want the New Year and Ded Moroz banned altogether, as was done with Valentine's Day.

== See also ==
- List of Christmas and winter gift-bringers by country
- Christmas in Eastern Europe – Overview of the various traditions practised at Christmas
- Father Christmas – Folkloric figure originating in England
- Sinterklaas – Legendary figure based on Saint Nicholas
- Jack Frost – Personification of frost and cold weather
- Old Man Winter – Personification of winter
- Moș Gerilă – Romanian Christmas folkloric character
- Noel Baba – Turkish new year celebration
- Snegurochka – Character in Russian fairy tales
