= Krampus =

Christmas figure in Alpine folklore

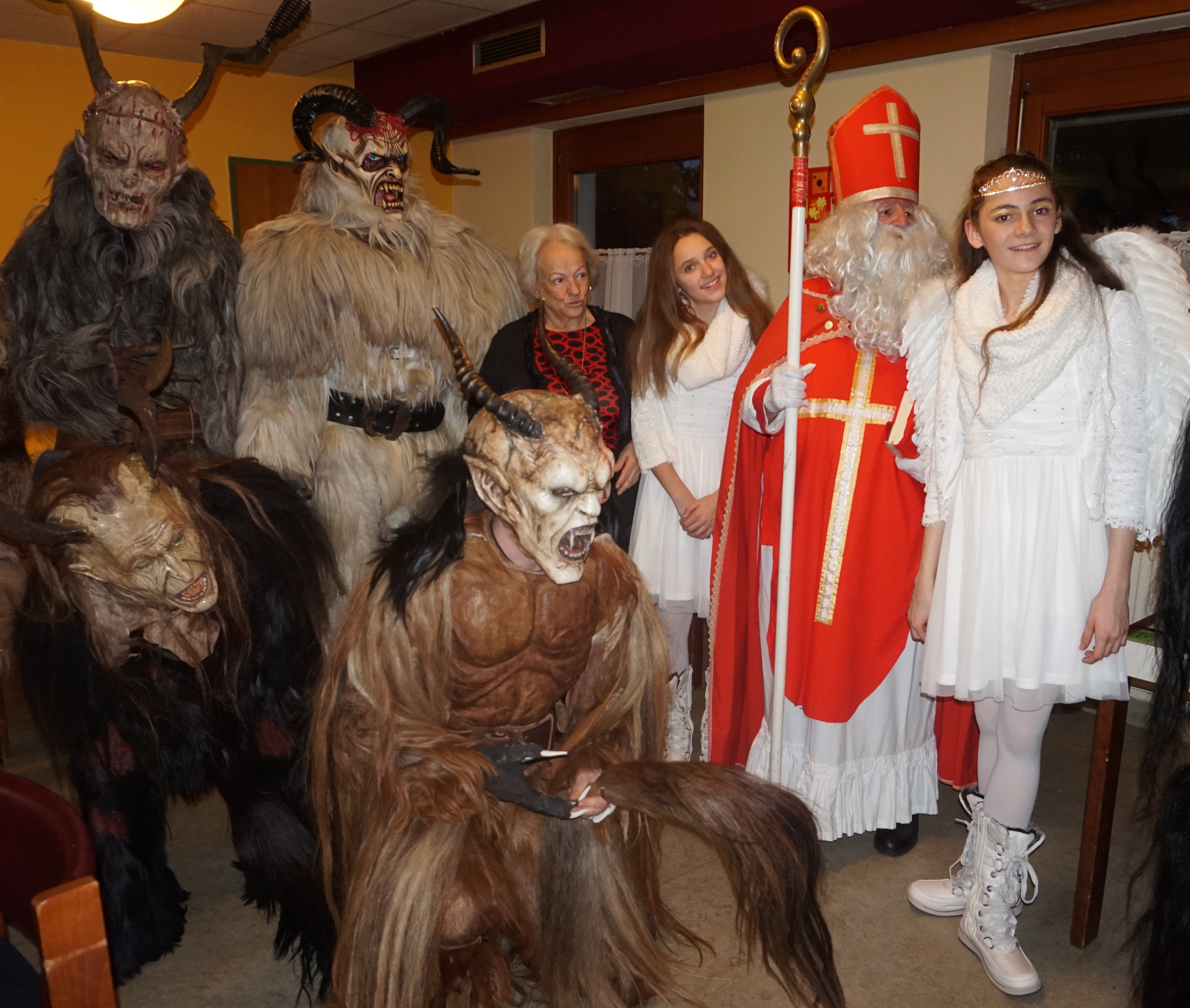
- Several depictions of Krampus alongside the Nikolaus

Creature information
- Other name(s): Krampusz, Kramper, Bartl
- Similar entities: Knecht Ruprecht, Zwarte Piet, Père Fouettard, Snegurochka, Belsnickel, Straggele, Grýla, Namahage
- Folklore: German, Austrian folklore, Croatian folklore

Origin
- Country: Germany, Czech Republic, Slovakia, Austria, Switzerland, Croatia, Bosnia and Herzegovina, Slovenia, Serbia, Ukraine, Poland, Hungary, Romania, Bulgaria, Liechtenstein, Italy, France, Netherlands, Belgium, Norway, Sweden, Denmark
- Region: Southeastern Germany, Central Europe
- Habitat: Alps, Carpathian Mountains, Low Countries, Scandinavia
- Details: Known for being a companion of Saint Nicholas

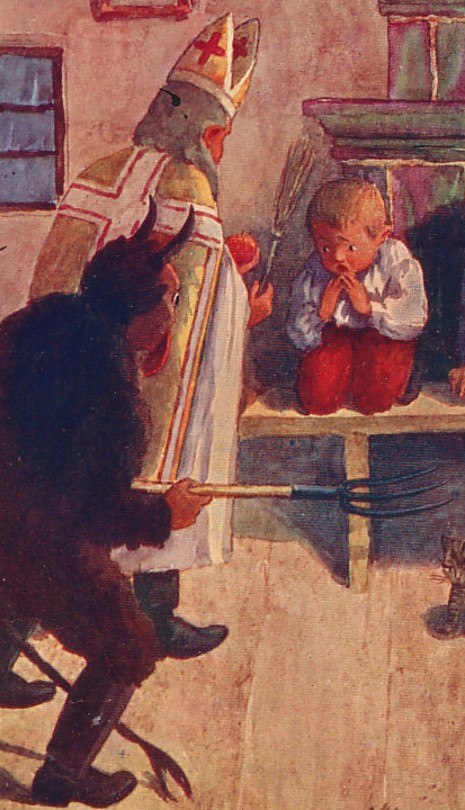
1900s illustration of Saint Nicholas and Krampus visiting a child

The Krampus (German: [ˈkʁampʊs]) is a horned anthropomorphic figure who, in the Central and Eastern Alpine folkloric tradition, is said to accompany Saint Nicholas on visits to children during the night of 5 December (Krampusnacht; "Krampus Night"), immediately before the Feast of St. Nicholas on 6 December. In this tradition, Saint Nicholas rewards well-behaved children with small gifts, while Krampus punishes badly behaved ones with birch rods.

The origin of the figure is unclear; some folklorists and anthropologists have postulated that it may have pre-Christian origins, although historians generally consider this unlikely, as it is not attested until the 16th century. In certain traditional parades and in such events as the Krampuslauf ("Krampus run"), some young men dressed as Krampus attempt to scare the audience with their antics. Krampus is featured on holiday greeting cards called Krampuskarten.

The figure has been imported into popular culture around the world, and has appeared in movies, TV shows and video games.

== Origins ==
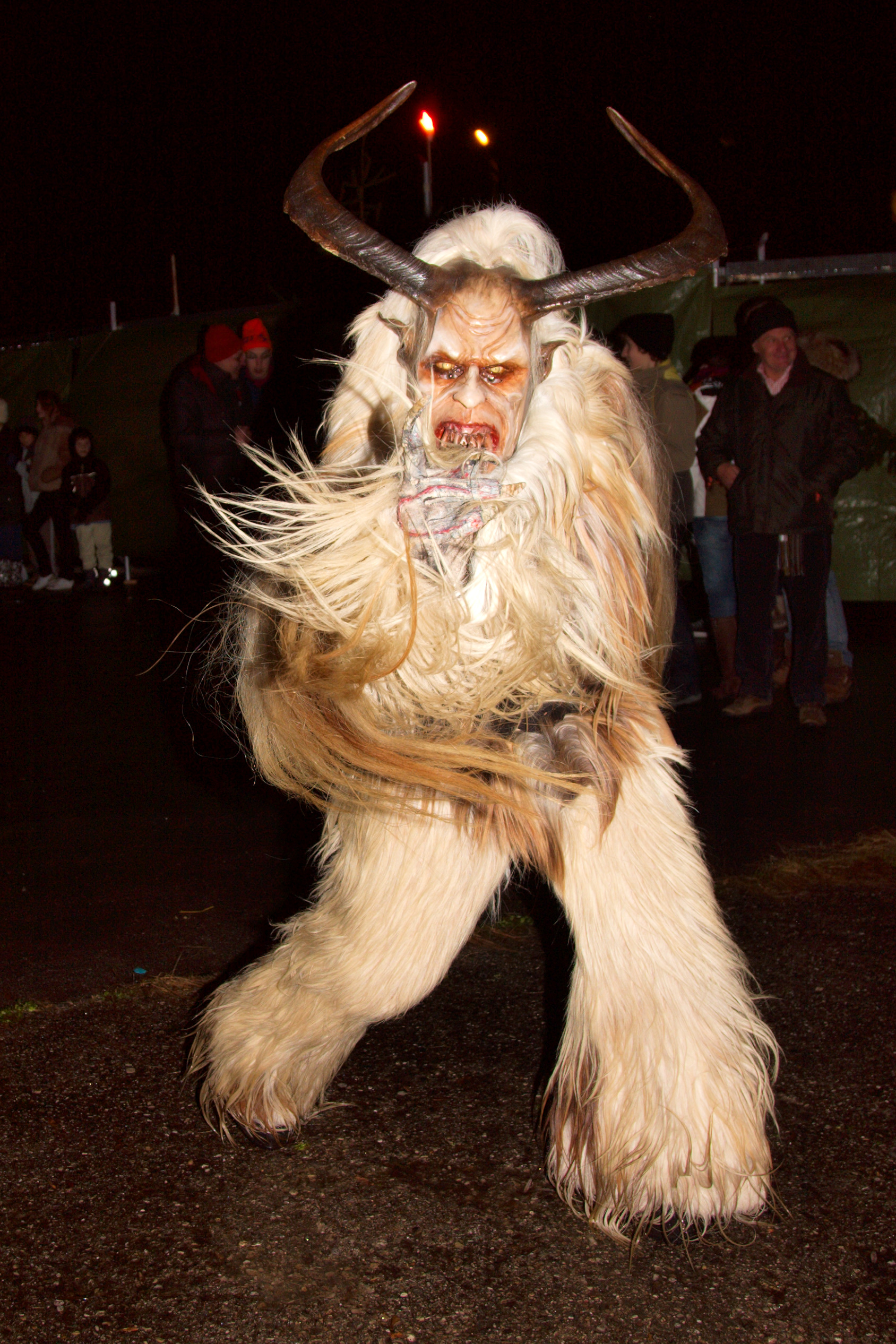
A person dressed as a Straggele at Morzger Pass, Salzburg, Austria

Discussing his observations in 1975 while in Irdning, a small town in Styria, anthropologist John J. Honigmann wrote that:

Masked devils acting boisterously and making nuisances of themselves have been known in Germany since at least the sixteenth century. At the same time, animal masked devils combining dreadful-comic (schauriglustig) antics appeared in medieval church plays. A large literature, much of it by European folklorists, bears on these subjects. Austrians in the community we studied are quite aware that “heathen” elements are blended with Christian elements in the Saint Nicholas customs and other traditional winter ceremonies. They believe Krampus derives from a pagan supernatural who was assimilated to the Christian devil.

Krampus is usually depicted as a man with horns, one grotesque human foot, and one goat’s foot. He is typically covered in black hair and has a very long, snake or dragon-like tongue. These qualities have increasingly made Krampus a character for horror costumes and films.

In the 17th century, Krampus was paired with St. Nicholas as a helper. Because Nicholas is a saint, it wasn’t logical or deemed saintly behavior for Nicholas to deliver punishments. Therefore, a helper was assigned to St Nicholas, such as Farmhand Rupert, Schmutzli, Père Fouettard, or Zwarte Piet, who would go down the chimney or punish the naughty children. Krampus served St Nicholas in the same role.

== Modern history ==
In the aftermath of the 1932 election in Austria, the Krampus tradition was prohibited by the Dollfuss regime under the clerical fascist Fatherland Front (Vaterländische Front) and the Christian Social Party.

In the 1950s, the Government of Austria distributed pamphlets titled “Krampus Is an Evil Man” for fear that encounters with Krampus might damage children’s mental health. Towards the end of the century, a popular resurgence of Krampus celebrations occurred and continues today.

The Krampus tradition is being revived in Bavaria as well, along with a local artistic tradition of hand-carved wooden masks.

== Appearance ==
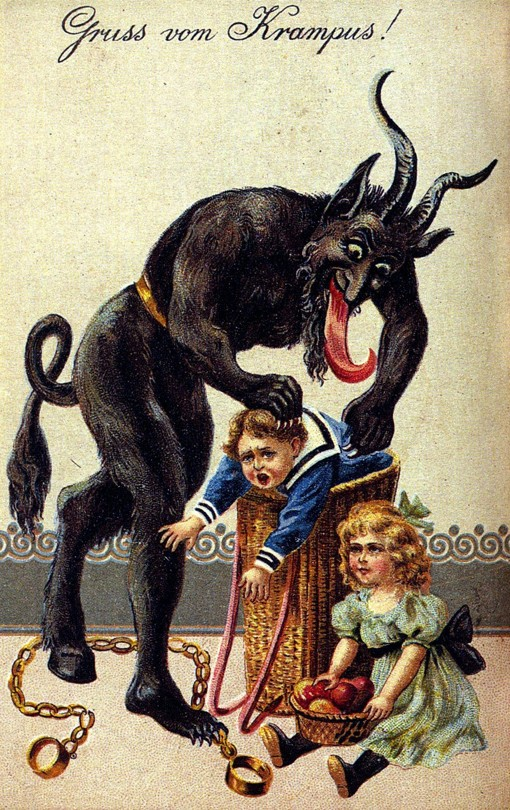
A 1900s greeting card reading 'Greetings from Krampus!'

Although Krampus appears in many variations, most share some common physical characteristics. He is hairy, horned, usually brown or black, and has one foot with the cloven hooves of a goat. His long, pointed tongue lolls out, and he has fangs.

Krampus carries chains, thought to symbolize the binding of the Devil by the Christian Church. He thrashes the chains for dramatic effect. The chains are sometimes accompanied with bells of various sizes. Krampus will carry a bundle of birch branches with which he occasionally swats children. The birch branches are replaced with a whip in some representations. On the eve before St. Nicholas Day (6th of December), Krampus travels together with St. Nicholas with a sack or a basket strapped to his back; this is to cart off evil children for drowning, eating, or transport to Hell. Some of the older versions make mention of naughty children being put in the bag and taken away. This quality can be found in other companions of Saint Nicholas such as Zwarte Piet.

== Krampusnacht ==
The Feast of St. Nicholas is celebrated in parts of Europe on 6 December. On the preceding evening of 5 December, Krampus Night or Krampusnacht, the wicked hairy devil appears on the streets. Sometimes accompanying St. Nicholas and sometimes on his own, Krampus visits homes and businesses. The Saint usually appears in the Eastern Rite vestments of a bishop, and he carries a golden ceremonial staff. Unlike North American versions of Santa Claus, in these celebrations Saint Nicholas concerns himself only with the good children, while Krampus is responsible for the bad. Nicholas dispenses gifts, while Krampus supplies coal and the birch rods.

=== Perchtenlauf and Krampuslauf ===
There were already established Red One traditions in the Alpine regions that became intertwined with Catholicism. People would masquerade as a devilish figure known as Percht, a two-legged humanoid goat with a giraffe-like neck, wearing animal furs. People wore costumes and marched in processions known as Perchtenlaufen, which are regarded as an earlier form of the Krampus runs. Perchtenlaufen were looked at with suspicion by the Catholic Church and banned by some civil authorities. Due to sparse population and rugged environments within the Alpine region, the ban was not effective or easily enforced, rendering the ban useless. Eventually the Perchtenlauf, inspired by the Nicholas plays, introduced Saint Nicholas and his set of good morals. The Percht transformed into what is now known as the Krampus and was made to be subjected to Saint Nicholas' will.

It is customary to offer a Krampus schnapps, a strong distilled fruit brandy as well as modern interpretations such as herbal liqueurs inspired by the tradition. These runs may include Perchten, similarly wild pagan spirits of Germanic folklore and sometimes female in representation, although the Perchten are properly associated with the period between winter solstice and 6 January.

=== Criticism of the Krampus run ===
Every year there are arguments during Krampus runs. Occasionally spectators take revenge for whippings and attack Krampuses. In 2013, after several Krampus runs in East Tyrol, a total of eight injured people (mostly with broken bones) were admitted to the Lienz district hospital and over 60 other patients were treated on an outpatient basis.

== Krampuskarten ==
Europeans have been exchanging greeting cards featuring Krampus since the 19th century. Sometimes introduced with Gruß vom Krampus (Greetings from Krampus), the cards usually have humorous rhymes and poems. Krampus is often featured looming menacingly over children. He is also shown as having one human foot and one cloven hoof. In some, Krampus has sexual overtones; he is pictured pursuing buxom women. Over time, the representation of Krampus in the cards has changed; older versions have a more frightening Krampus, while modern versions have a cuter, more Cupid-like creature. Krampus has also adorned postcards and candy containers.

== Related celebrations and associated figures ==
Krampus appears in the folklore of Austria, Bavaria, Bosnia and Herzegovina, Croatia, the Czech Republic, Hungary, Romania, Bulgaria, Northern Italy (Autonomous Province of Trento, South Tyrol, Province of Belluno and Friuli-Venezia Giulia), Slovakia, and Slovenia.

In Styria, the bundle of birch rods is presented by Krampus to families. The twigs are painted gold and displayed year-round in the house—a reminder to any child who has temporarily forgotten Krampus. In smaller, more isolated villages, the figure has other beastly companions, such as the antlered "wild man" figures, and St Nicholas is nowhere to be seen. These Styrian companions of Krampus are called Schabmänner or Rauhen., and are similar to the kukeri dancers of Bulgaria.

A toned-down version of Krampus is part of the popular Christmas markets in Austrian urban centres like Salzburg. In these, more tourist-friendly interpretations, Krampus is more humorous than fearsome.

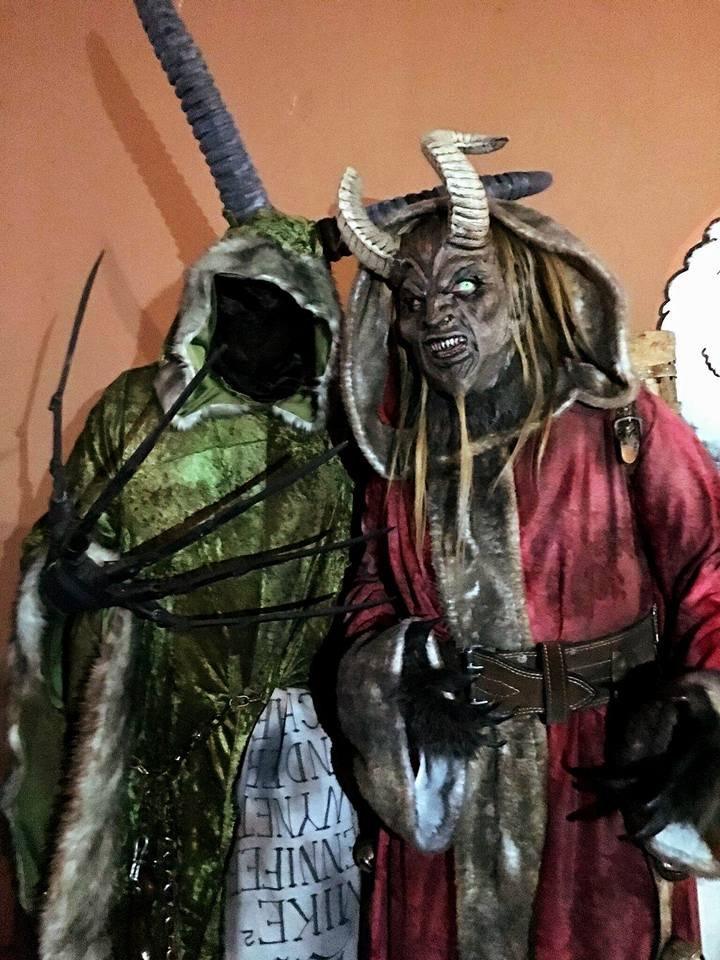
Dallas Krampus Society Walk, 2016

North American Krampus celebrations are a growing phenomenon.

Similar figures are recorded in neighboring areas. Strohbart in Bavaria, Klaubauf(mann) in Austria and Bavaria, while Bartl or Bartel, Niglobartl, and Wubartl are used in the southern part of the country. Other names include Barrel or Bartholomeus (Styria), Schmutzli (German-speaking Switzerland), Pöpel or Hüllepöpel (Würzburg), Zember (Cheb), Belzmärte and Pelzmärtel (Swabia and Franconia). In most parts of Slovenia, whose culture was greatly affected by Austrian culture, Krampus is called parkelj and is one of the companions of Miklavž, the Slovenian form of St. Nicholas.

In many parts of Bosnia and Herzegovina and Croatia, Krampus is described as a devil wearing a cloth sack around his waist and chains around his neck, ankles, and wrists. As a part of a tradition, when a child receives a gift from St. Nicholas he is given a golden branch to represent his good deeds throughout the year; however, if the child has misbehaved, Krampus will take the gifts for himself and leave only a silver branch to represent the child's bad acts.

== In popular culture ==
The character of Krampus has been imported and modified for various North American media, including print (e.g., Krampus: The Devil of Christmas, a collection of vintage postcards by Monte Beauchamp in 2004; Krampus: The Yule Lord, a 2012 novel by Gerald Brom), Krampus, a comic book series from Image Comics in 2013 created by Dean Kotz and Brian Joines, television – both live action ("A Krampus Carol", a 2012 episode of The League) and animation ("A Very Venture Christmas", a 2004 episode of The Venture Bros.; "Minstrel Krampus", a 2013 episode of American Dad!), video games (CarnEvil, a 1998 arcade game; The Binding of Isaac: Rebirth, a 2014 video game), and films (Krampus, a 2015 Christmas comedy horror film from Universal Pictures, and Red One, a 2024 Christmas action adventure comedy film from Seven Bucks Productions and Amazon Studios). The character has also inspired a range of seasonal consumer products and themed merchandise. In the United States, Krampus-themed alcoholic beverages have also been produced, with some herbal liqueurs explicitly referencing the folklore figure.

== See also ==
- Belsnickel – German Christmas gift-bringer
- Bogeyman – Mythological antagonist
- Ded Moroz – Christmas figure in eastern Slavic cultures
- Knecht Ruprecht – Companion of Saint Nicholas in Germanic folklore
- Kukeri – Participants in Bulgarian tradition
- Pre-Christian Alpine traditions
- Silvesterklaus – Festival role in Appenzell, Switzerland
- Sinterklaas – Legendary figure based on Saint Nicholas
- Turoń – Creature in Polish folklore
- Chort — Slavic demon
- Grýla — Icelandic child-eating troll
