= Ayaz Ata =

Tengri winter god and Turkic gift-giver

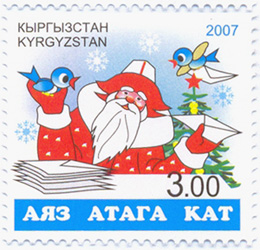
- Kyrgyz stamp from 2007 showing Ayaz Ata with two birds and a text saying Аяз Атага Кат (English: Letter to Ayaz Ata)

Creature information
- Other name(s): Ayaz Baba, Şaxta Baba, Chyskhaan, Kysh Babay
- Similar entities: Ded Moroz, Santa Claus, Sinterklaas, Amu Nowruz
- Folklore: Turkic

Origin
- Region: Central Asia, North Asia, Caucasus, Volga Region, Anatolia
- Habitat: Central Asia, North Asia, Volga Region

Ayaz Ata (Note: Uzbek: Ayoz Bobo, Kyrgyz: Аяз ата, romanized: Ayaz ata, Kazakh: Аyaz Ata, Turkmen: Aýaz Baba, Bashkir: Ҡыш Бабай, romanized: Qış Babay, Tatar: Кыш бабай, romanized: Qış babay, Azerbaijani: Şaxta Baba, Yakut: Чысхаан, romanized: Çısxân) is a winter god originating from Tengrism and a fictional tale character that serves as the Turkic counterpart to Santa Claus and Ded Moroz.

== In mythology ==
The literal translation of the name would be Frost Father, although the name is often translated as Grandfather Frost. He is the winter god in Tengrism and according to Turkic mythology is created of Moon light, caused by cold weather and associated with bringing snow, protecting people from too cold weather and "waking the nature up from its sleep".

== Features ==
Literary depictions of Ayaz Ata commonly show him accompanied by Kar Kız (Tatar: Кар Кызы, romanized: Kar Kyzy, or, Azerbaijani: Qar Qızı, meaning "Snow Girl" or "Snow Maiden"), his granddaughter and helper, sometimes with influence of Slavic Snegurochka, who is often depicted in long silver-blue robes and a furry cap or a snowflake-like crown. She is a unique attribute of Ayaz Ata because no traditional gift-givers from other cultures, besides Ded Moroz, are portrayed with a similar companion.

== Versions ==
=== Azerbaijan ===
In Azerbaijani, Ayaz Ata is known as Şaxta Baba (English: Grandfather Frost) and his companion grandchild is known as Qar Qızı, who Şaxta Baba brings gifts to children at New Year's Eve with together. Every December, actors playing Şaxta Baba and Qar Qızı stand next to a Christmas tree (Azerbaijani: Yolka, or, Turkish: Yeni il ağacı) at Baku Boulevard and other attractions in Baku, giving away presents to and taking pictures with children. Since 2014 however, every actor needs a license costing up to $75.

=== Bashkortostan and Tatarstan ===
In Bashkir and Tatar, Ayaz Ata is known as Ҡыш бабай/Кыш бабай (Qïş babay/Kïş babay, literally: Winter Father), and his granddaughter is as Ҡарһылыу (Qarhïlïw, Snow beauty).

=== Yakutia ===
Chyskhaan (Yakut: Чысхаан, romanized: Chyskhaan) is known as the master of cold, accompanied by the snow maiden Khaarchana (Yakut: Харчаана, romanized: Kharchaana) in Yakutia. He is very similar to Ded Moroz, however a more "East Asian" version of him.

=== Central Asia ===
Аяз Ата (Ayaz Ata) is the same term used in both Kazakh and Kyrgyz, while the Uzbeks and Turkmens use Ayoz Bobo/Aýaz Baba, replacing the word for father with grandfather. The term for Snow girl however is different in all 4 languages (Kazakh: Aqşaqar, Kyrgyz: Аяз кыз, romanized: Ayaz kyz, Uzbek: Qorqiz, Turkmen: Gar gyz)
