= Saint Nicholas Day =

Feast day of Nicholas of Myra

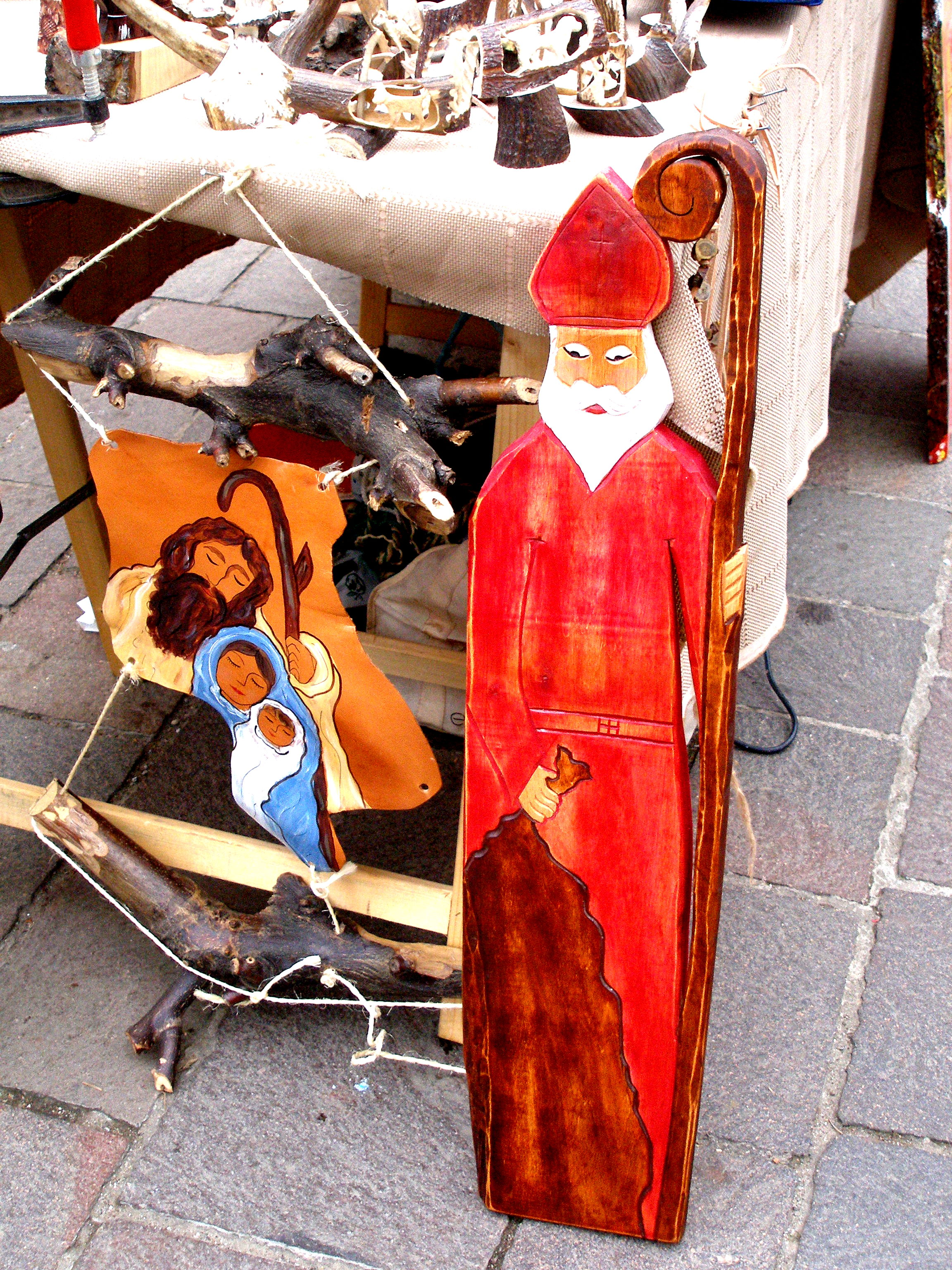
- A depiction of Saint Nicholas with his sack standing next to a Nativity Scene
- Observed by: Anglicanism, Catholicism, Eastern Orthodoxy, Lutheranism, Methodism, Calvinistic Methodism, and Reformed (Calvinist)
- Type: Christian
- Significance: Feast day of Saint Nicholas
- Celebrations: placing shoes in the foyer before bedtime
- Observances: Attending Mass or other service of worship
- Date: 5/6 December (Western Christianity and Eastern Christianity on the New Calendar); 18/19 December (Eastern Christianity on the Old Calendar)
- Frequency: annual

Saint Nicholas Day, also called the Feast of Saint Nicholas, observed on 6 December (or on its eve on 5 December) in Western Christian countries, and on 19 December in Eastern Christian countries using the old church Calendar, is the feast day of Saint Nicholas of Myra; it falls within the season of Advent. It is celebrated as a Christian festival with particular regard to Saint Nicholas' reputation as a bringer of gifts, as well as through the attendance of church services.

In Germany and Poland, boys have traditionally dressed as bishops and begged alms for the poor. In the Portuguese city of Guimarães, the Nicolinas, a series of festivities in honor of Saint Nicholas, happen every year. In Poland and Ukraine children wait for St. Nicholas to come and to put a present under their pillows provided that the children were good during the year. Children who behaved badly may expect to find a twig or a piece of coal under their pillows. In the Netherlands and Belgium children put out a shoe filled with hay and a carrot for Saint Nicholas' horse. On Saint Nicholas Day, gifts are tagged with personal humorous rhymes written by the sender. In the United States, one custom associated with Saint Nicholas Day is children leaving their stockings hung up to be filled with mini gifts or leaving their shoes in the foyer on Saint Nicholas Eve in hope that Saint Nicholas will place some coins on the soles.

The American Santa Claus, as well as the British Father Christmas, are derived from Saint Nicholas. "Santa Claus" is itself derived in part from the Dutch Sinterklaas, the saint's name in that language. However, the gift giving associated with these descendant figures has come to be associated with Christmas Day rather than Saint Nicholas Day itself.

== Saint Nicholas ==
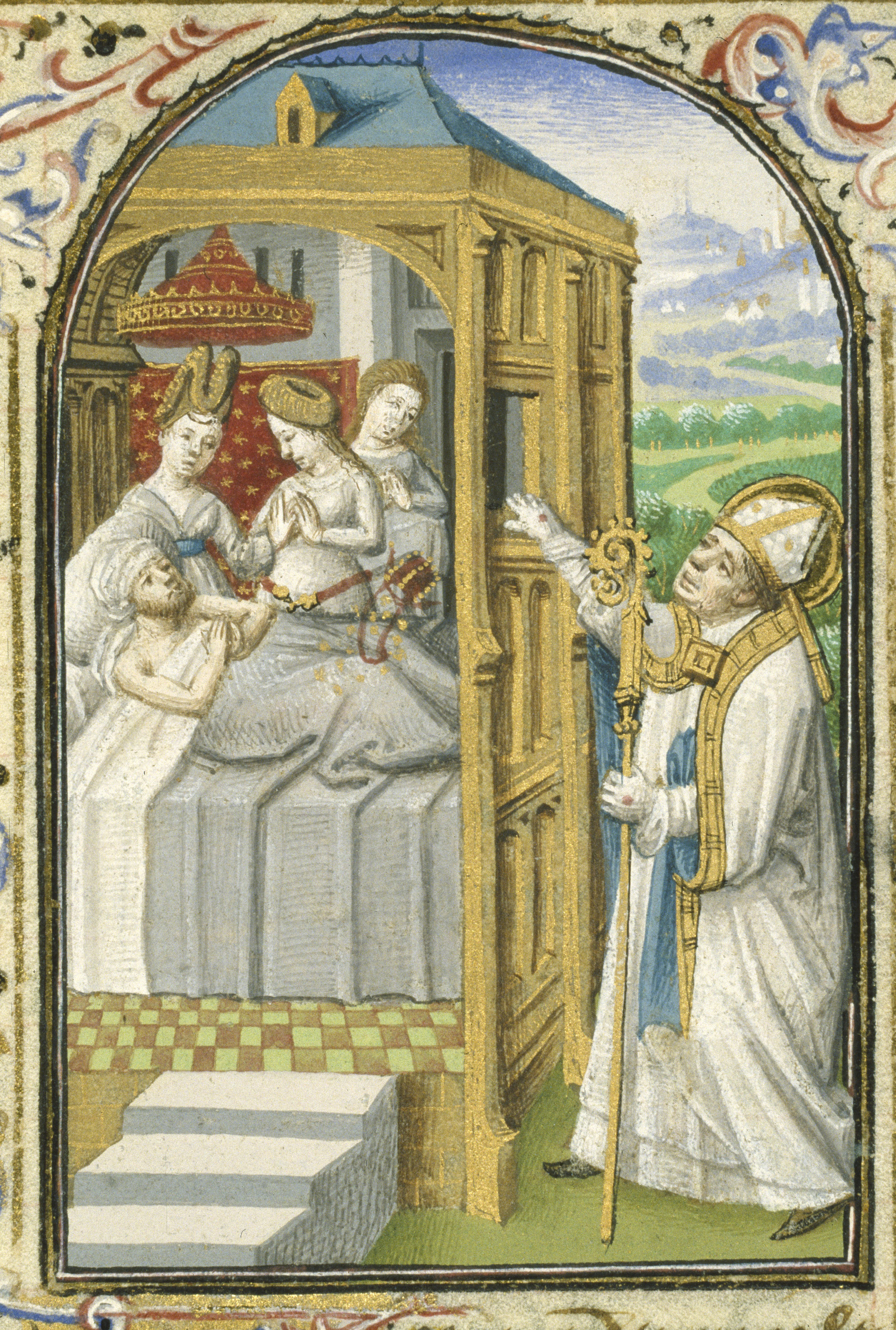
A depiction of Saint Nicholas, Bishop of Myra, giving dowry money to three poor girls

Nicholas of Myra, according to Christian tradition, was born in Patar in Asia Minor. He is said to have made a pilgrimage to Egypt to study theology under the Desert Fathers after which he was consecrated the Bishop of Myra. During the Diocletianic Persecution of Christians, Nicholas of Myra was imprisoned. He was released after Constantine the Great promulgated the Edict of Milan in 313, which allowed for the public practice of Christianity in the Roman Empire. Nicholas of Myra was known for his generosity through a Christian legend, in which he gave a poor father money in order to prevent his daughters from being taken into slavery, as the father did not have the funds for his daughters' dowries. It is said that Nicholas of Myra threw the money through the family's window, which landed in their shoes, which were drying near their fireplace.

Nicholas of Myra died on 6 December 346, giving rise to the present Feast of Saint Nicholas. The saint was entombed in St. Nicholas Church, Demre, though in 1087, Italian soldiers transferred his remains to Italy, where they were enshrined in the Basilica di San Nicola and are held to this day. Saint Nicholas' tomb is said to exude the Oil of Saint Nicholas, which has attracted, throughout the centuries, Christian pilgrims who take the oil home in small bottles to use during prayer.

Nicholas of Myra is the patron hallow of children, sailors, those undergoing financial problems, and victims of fire.

In the 11th century, Christian nuns in Belgium and France initiated the practice of giving the poor gifts in the name of Saint Nicholas. This custom spread to Germany and Holland further spreading the Feast of Saint Nicholas and its associated customs.

== Traditions by continent ==
=== Europe ===
==== Balkans ====
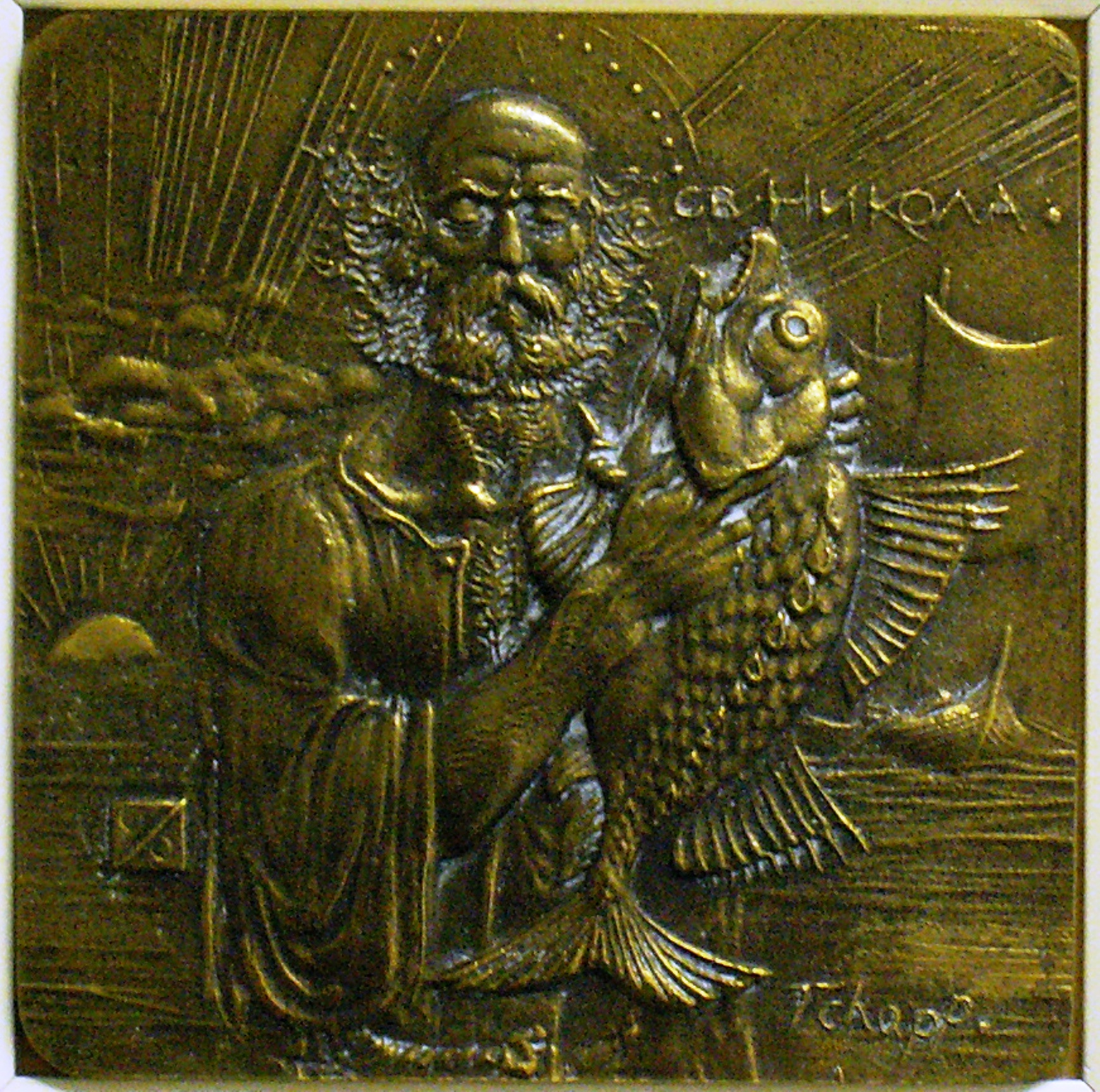
A modern metal icon of Saint Nicholas by the Bulgarian artist Georgi 'Chapa' Chapkanov. Gilbert House, Stanley, Falkland Islands.

Among Albanians, Saint Nicholas is known as Shen'Kollë and is venerated by most Catholic families, even those from villages that are devoted to other saints. The Feast of Saint Nicholas is celebrated on the evening before 6 December, known as Shen'Kolli i Dimnit (Saint Nicholas of Winter), as well as on the commemoration of the interring of his bones in Bari, the evening before 9 May, known as Shen'Kolli i Majit (Saint Nicholas of May). Albanian Catholics often swear by Saint Nicholas, saying "Pasha Shejnti Shen'Kollin!" ("May I see Holy Saint Nicholas!"), indicating the importance of this saint in Albanian culture, especially among the Albanians of Malësia. On the eve of his feast day, Albanians will light a candle and abstain from meat, preparing a feast of roasted lamb and pork, to be served to guests after midnight. Guests will greet each other, saying, "Nata e Shen'Kollit ju nihmoftë!" ("May the Night of Saint Nicholas help you!") and other such blessings. The bones of Albania's greatest hero, George Kastrioti, were also interred in the Church of Saint Nicholas in Lezha, Albania, upon his death.

In Greece, Saint Nicholas does not carry an especial association with gift-giving, as this tradition is carried over to St. Basil of Caesarea, celebrated on New Year's Day. St. Nicholas is the protector of sailors, he is considered the patron saint of the Greek Navy, military and merchant alike, and his day is marked by festivities aboard all ships and boats, at sea and in port. According to the tradition, it is Agios Nikolaos who makes the winds rage and cease, he can walk on the seas and whenever there is a ship in trouble, he would save it.

It is also associated with the preceding feasts of St. Barbara (4 December), St. Savvas (5 December), and the following feast of St. Anne (9 December); all these are often collectively called the " Nikolobárbara", and are considered a succession of days that heralds the onset of truly wintry cold weather in the country. Therefore, by tradition, homes should have already been laid with carpets, removed for the warm season, by St. Andrew's Day (30 November), a week ahead of the Nikolobárbara.

Traditional fish-based feast on Saint Nicholas Day as celebrated by a Roma family in Sofia, Bulgaria

In Serbia, Nikoljdan is celebrated on 19 December. Since Nikoljdan always falls during the fasting period preceding Christmas, it is celebrated according to the Eastern Orthodox fasting rules ("Post"). This entails the complete avoidance of animal-sourced food products (meat, milk, dairy products, and eggs). The hosts who celebrate as the tradition says, prepare smoked carp for guests.

In Bulgaria, Saint Nicholas Day is celebrated on 6 December as Nikulden. Families invite relatives, sponsors, and neighbors for a meal of fish (usually ribnik, a carp wrapped in dough) and two loaves of ceremonial bread, all of which are blessed at church or at home. The host wafts incense over the table, then lifts and breaks the bread. Bulgarians also observe 6 December as the name day for those with the names Nikola, Nikolay, Kolyo, Nikolina, Neno, Nenka, Nikoleta and Nina.

==== Belgium, Netherlands, and Luxembourg ====
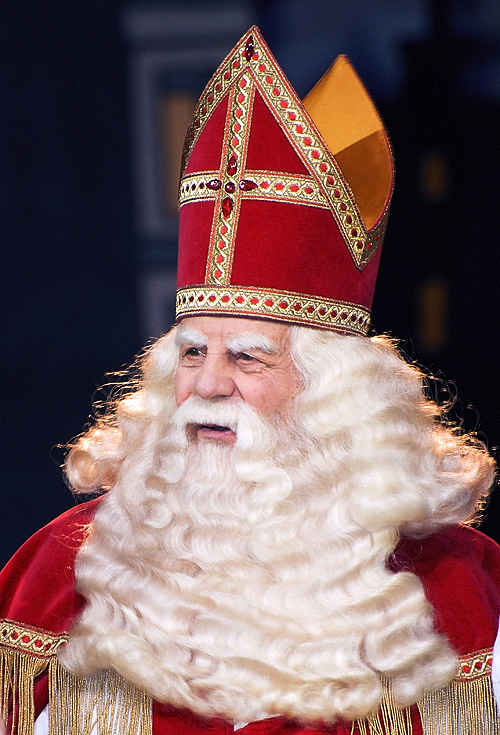
Sinterklaas in the Netherlands in 2007

In the Netherlands, his feast day is celebrated on 5 December, the Eve of Saint Nicholas. It is believed that Sinterklaas travels from Spain by boat. His arrival each November is a big event for children. In the days leading up to 5 December, young children put their shoes in front of the chimneys and sing Sinterklaas songs. The next morning they find a small present in their shoes, ranging from sweets to marbles or some other small toy. He is assisted by many mischievous helpers, called 'Zwarte Pieten' ("Black Petes") or "Père Fouettard" in the French-speaking part of Belgium, with black faces and colourful Moorish dress, dating back two centuries. In the past, it was said that the Zwarte Pieten took all the naughty children, put them into sacks, and Sinterklaas took them with him to Spain.

On the Frisian islands (Waddeneilanden), the Sinterklaas feast has developed independently into traditions very different from the one on the mainland. On the island of Terschelling mainly, but also other Wadden Islands, Sundrum is the name given to Sinterklaas.

In recent years there has been a recurrent discussion about the perceived politically incorrect nature of Zwarte Piet. In particular Dutch citizens with an Afro background or African roots might feel offended by the Dutch slavery history connected to this emblem and regard the representation of Zwarte Piet as racist. Others state that the black skin color of Zwarte Piet originates in his profession as a chimney sweep, hence the delivery of packages through the chimney.

The rise of Father Christmas (known in Dutch as de Kerstman) is often cited as an example of globalization and Americanisation.

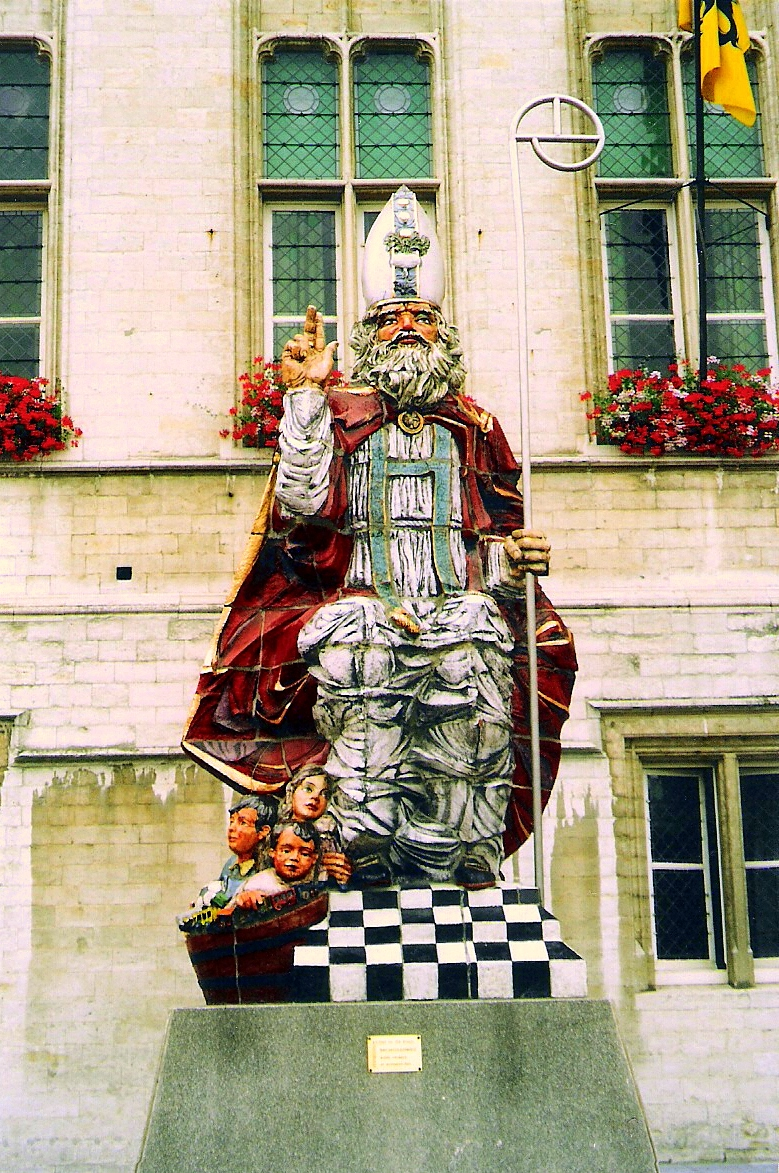
Sinterklaas, Sint-Niklaas

In Belgium, they celebrate Sinterklaasfeest (Dutch-speaking) or la Saint-Nicolas (French-speaking) on the morning of 6 December. He arrives by steamboat around mid-November every year when he makes his annual entry in Antwerp, an event that is usually attended by hundreds of children. Sinterklaas wears a bishop's robes including a red cape and mitre and rides a white horse named Schimmel or Amerigo in the Netherlands and Slecht Weer Vandaag (bad weather today) in Flanders. The town of Sint-Niklaas in East Flanders has a statue of Sinterklaas in front of its town hall.

In Luxembourg, during the run-up to 6 December, De Kleeschen visits schools. He wears a bishop's mitre on his head and carries a bishop's crosier. De Kleeschen gives presents to well-behaved children; his companion the Houseker gives those who have misbehaved twigs.

==== Eastern Central Europe and Eastern Europe ====
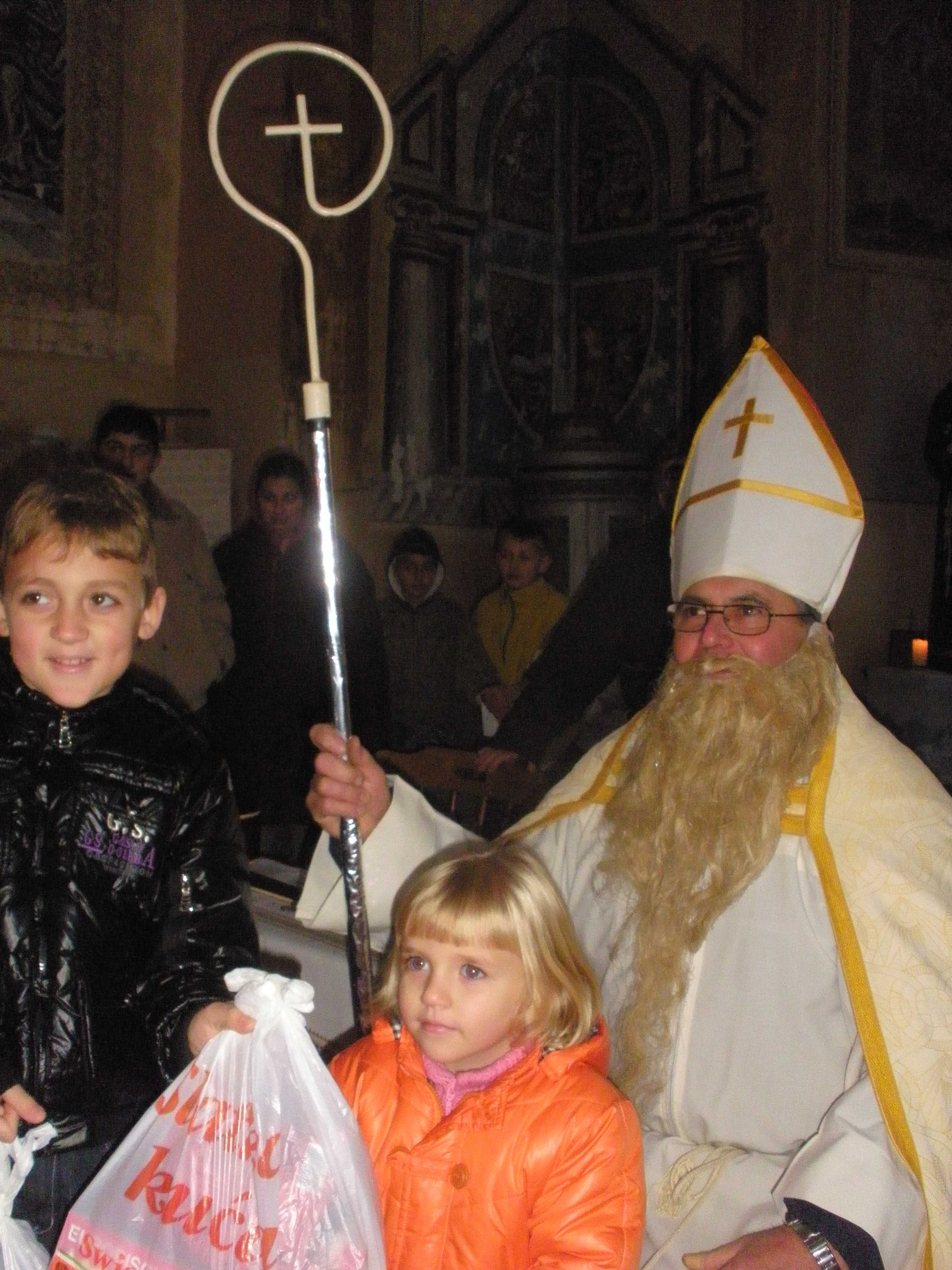
Mikulás in Ečka (Vojvodina – Serbia) brings joy to children in 2010.

In Slovenia, Miklavž (Sveti Miklavž) and in Croatia, Nikola (Sveti Nikola) who visits on Saint Nicholas day (Nikolinje in Croatia and "Miklavževanje" in Slovenia) brings gifts to children commending them for their good behavior over the past year and exhorting them to continue in the same manner in the year to come. If they fail to do so they will receive a visit from "Parkelj" or Krampus who traditionally leaves a rod, an instrument their parents will use to discipline them.

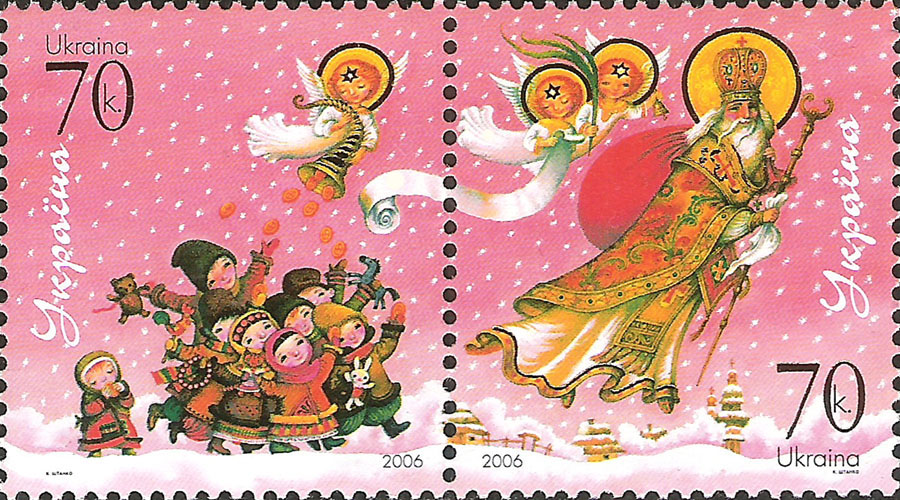
2006 Christmas stamp, Ukraine, showing Saint Nicholas and children

In Hungary, Croatia, Poland, Slovakia, Ukraine and Romania, children typically leave their cleaned boots on the windowsill on the evening before St. Nicholas Day. By next morning Nikolaus (Szent Miklós traditionally but more commonly known as Mikulás in Hungary or Moș Nicolae (Sfântul Nicolae) in Romania) and in Ukraine Sviatyi Mykolay leaves candies and gifts (Hungarian: virgács, Romanian: nuielușă). In Hungary and Croatia he is often accompanied by the Krampusz/Krampus, the frightening helper who is out to take away the bad ones.

In Slovenia, Saint Nikolaus (Miklavž) is accompanied by an angel and a devil (parkelj) corresponding to the Austrian Krampus.

==== Ukraine ====
In Ukraine, Saint Nicholas (Mykolai) visits all children during the night and brings presents on 5–6 December. Before the calendar reform in Ukrainian churches, the holiday was celebrated on 18–19 December [O.S. 5–6 December] until 2023. From this day, Ukrainians start preparing for the Christmas holidays. Thus, in the cities and towns of Ukraine, Christmas trees are traditionally opened on Saint Nicholas Day.

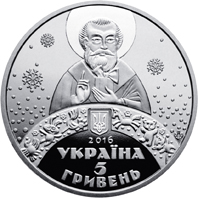
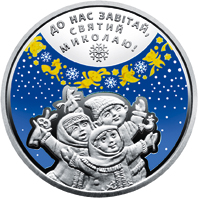
A commemorative coin of the NBU with a denomination of 5 hryvnias, dedicated to Saint Nicholas

In Ukraine, the image of Saint Nicholas (Sviatyi Mykolai) and the tradition of giving gifts are being revived. Also, the tradition of caring for the needy is increasingly respected: both in the form of charity events in church communities and in secular charitable projects. In schools, on the eve of the holiday, lessons are held where children are taught to write a letter to Saint Nicholas.

On this day, some public organizations hold traditional charity events for orphans. So, every year in Lviv, the campaign "Mykolai will not forget about you!" takes place: the city organizes the "Saint Nicholas Factory", where residents bring gifts and donations for orphans; campaign activists distribute them to children in the evenings of 18 and 19 December. Every year, Plast collects every chicken and prepares a large program for orphans and disabled children.

On 6 June 2006, President Viktor Yushchenko signed Decree No. 481/2006 "On measures to revive traditional folk art and folk arts and crafts in Ukraine", which includes, in particular, working out the issue of creating the "St. Nicholas Manor" complex in the Ivano-Frankivsk Oblast with the Building works of folk masters of the National Union of Masters of Folk Art of Ukraine. In 2010, President Viktor Yanukovych instructed the government to provide in the state budget for 2011 funds for the construction of the Estate of Saint Nicholas in the Hutsulshchyna National Park.

In 2018, the Big Hand Films company, with the financial support of Derzhkino, released the film directed by Semen Horov, "The Adventures of S Nicholas". The film tells about the faith of modern children in a good wizard who comes with gifts on the night before Saint Nicholas Day.

==== France ====
Even though Saint Nicolas is a Christmas traditional figure across all the French territory, the important celebrations on 6 December are limited to Alsace, the French Low Countries, the French Ardennes, Franche-Comté, the Argonne and Lorraine, where he is patron. This day can be celebrated in some villages of other regions. A little donkey carries baskets filled with children's gifts, biscuits and sweets. The whole family gets ready for the saint's arrival on 6 December, with grandparents telling stories of the saint. The most popular one (also the subject of a popular French children's song) is of three children who wandered away and got lost. Cold and hungry, a wicked butcher lured them into his shop where he killed them and salted them away in a large tub. Through Saint Nicolas' help the boys were revived and returned to their families, earning him a reputation as protector of children. The evil butcher has followed Saint Nicolas in penance ever since as Père Fouettard. In France, statues and paintings often portray this event, showing the saint with children in a barrel.

Bakeries and home kitchens are hives of activity as spiced gingerbread biscuits and mannala (a brioche shaped like the saint) are baked. In schools, children learn songs and poems and create arts and crafts about Saint Nicolas, while in nursery schools, a man portraying Saint Nicolas gives away chocolates and sometimes little presents. He is sometimes accompanied by an actor playing Père Fouettard, who, like his German counterpart Krampus, carries switches to threaten the children who fear he will advise Saint Nicolas to pass them by on his gift-giving rounds.

In Alsace, Lorraine, Argonne and in the countryside of Montbéliard Saint Nicolas is accompanied by the Père Fouettard, but the character of the Père Fouettard is well known across all the French territory. He is sometimes also present in the French Ardennes. In Alsace and in Franconian Lorraine Saint Nicolas is also accompanied by the Christkind. In the historically French Flemish-speaking town of Dunkirk, Zwarte Piet is the companion of the Saint.

==== Western Central Europe ====
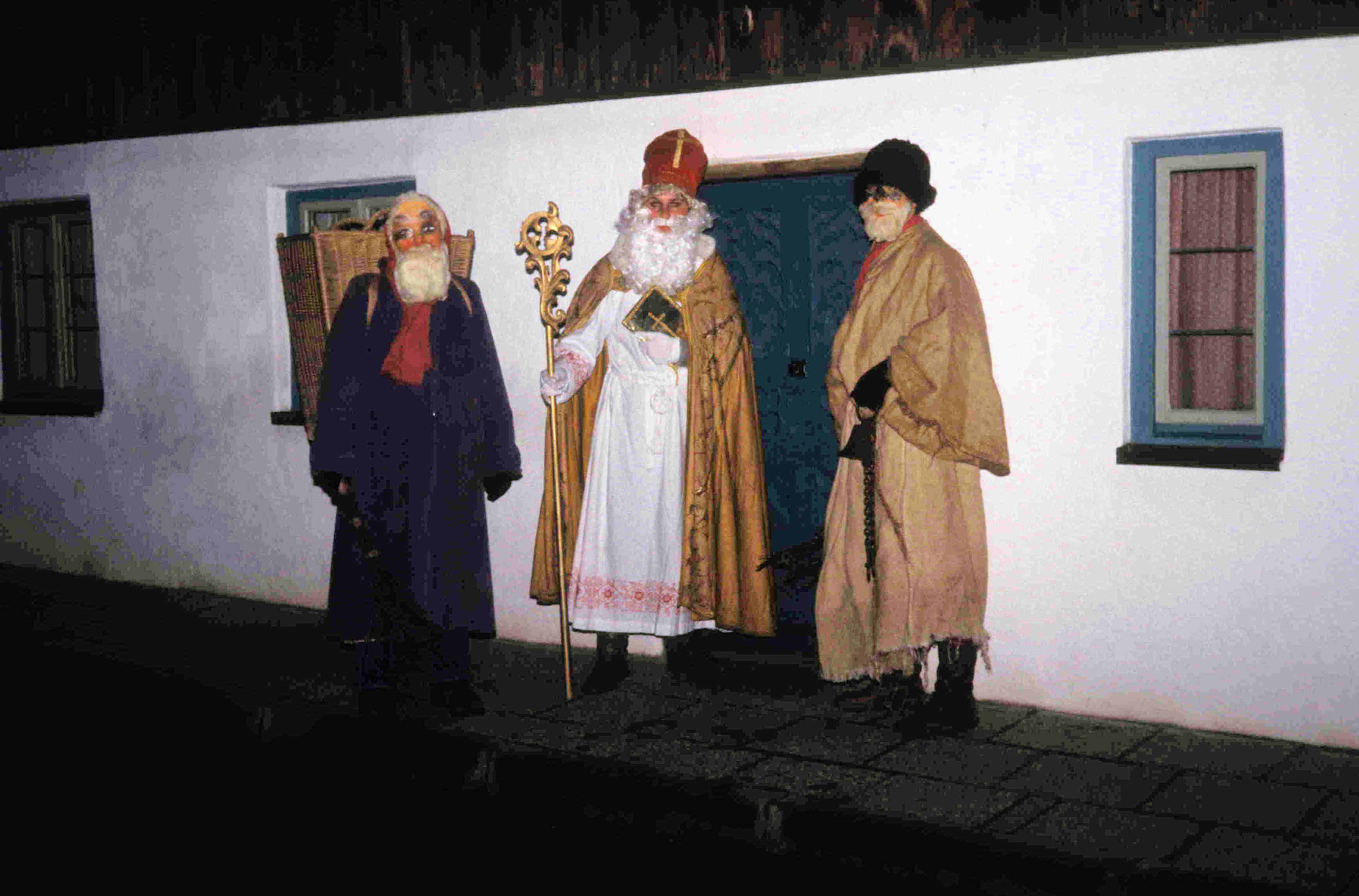
Saint Nicholas and his companions in Haunzenbergersöll, Bavaria (1986)

In Northern Germany, Sankt Nikolaus is usually celebrated on a small scale. Many children put a boot called Nikolaus-Stiefel (Nikolaus boot) outside the front door on the night of 5 December. Saint Nicholas fills the boot with gifts and sweets overnight, and at the same time checks up on the children to see if they were good, polite and helpful the last year. If they were not, they will have a stick (eine Rute) in their boots instead. Nicholas is often portrayed in Northern German folklore as being accompanied by Knecht Ruprecht who inquires of the children if they have been saying their prayers, and if not, he shakes his bag of ashes at them, or beats them with a stick. Sometimes a Nikolaus impersonator also visits the children at school or in their homes and asks them if they have been good (sometimes ostensibly checking his golden book for their record), handing out presents on the basis of their behavior. This has become more lenient in recent decades, and this task is often taken over by the Weihnachtsmann (Father Christmas). In more Catholic regions, Saint Nikolaus is dressed very much like a bishop, rides on a horse, and is welcomed at public places by large crowds. He has a long beard, and loves children, except when they have been naughty. This tradition has been kept alive annually.

In Poland Mikołaj is often also accompanied by an angel (anioł) who acts as a counterweight to the ominous devil(czart). Poland and in Slovakia children find the candy and small gifts under the pillow, in their shoes or behind the window the evening of 5 December or the morning of 6 December.

In Austria, Bavaria and South-Tyrol (Austro-Bavarian regions), Saint Nicholas is accompanied by Krampus, represented as a beast-like creature, generally demonic in appearance. Krampus is thought to punish children during the Yule season who had misbehaved, and to capture particularly naughty children in his sack and carry them away to his lair. The tradition of Krampus was adapted by Czechs and Slovaks during the Austrian-Hungarian era. In addition, in Czechia and Slovakia Saint Nicholas is accompanied by an angel. In Czechia and Slovakia children receive some candies for their good deeds from Saint Nicholas (Mikuláš) and potatoes or coal from Chort (čert) for their sins. The creature has roots in Slavic folklore; however, its influence has spread far beyond German borders, in Austria, southern Bavaria, South Tyrol, northern Friuli, Hungary, Slovenia, the Czech Republic, the Slovak Republic and Croatia. 5 December is Krampus Night or Krampusnacht, in which the hairy devil appears on the streets. Traditionally young men dress up as the Krampus during the first week of December, particularly on the evening of 5 December (the eve of Saint Nichola Day on many church calendars), and roam the streets frightening children with rusty chains and bells. Sometimes accompanying Saint Nicholas and sometimes on his own, Krampus visits homes and businesses. The Saint usually appears in the Eastern Rite vestments of a bishop, and he carries a ceremonial staff. Nicholas dispenses gifts, while Krampus supplies coal and the ruten bundles. Krampus is featured on holiday greeting cards called Krampuskarten. There are many names for Krampus, as well as many regional variations in portrayal and celebration.

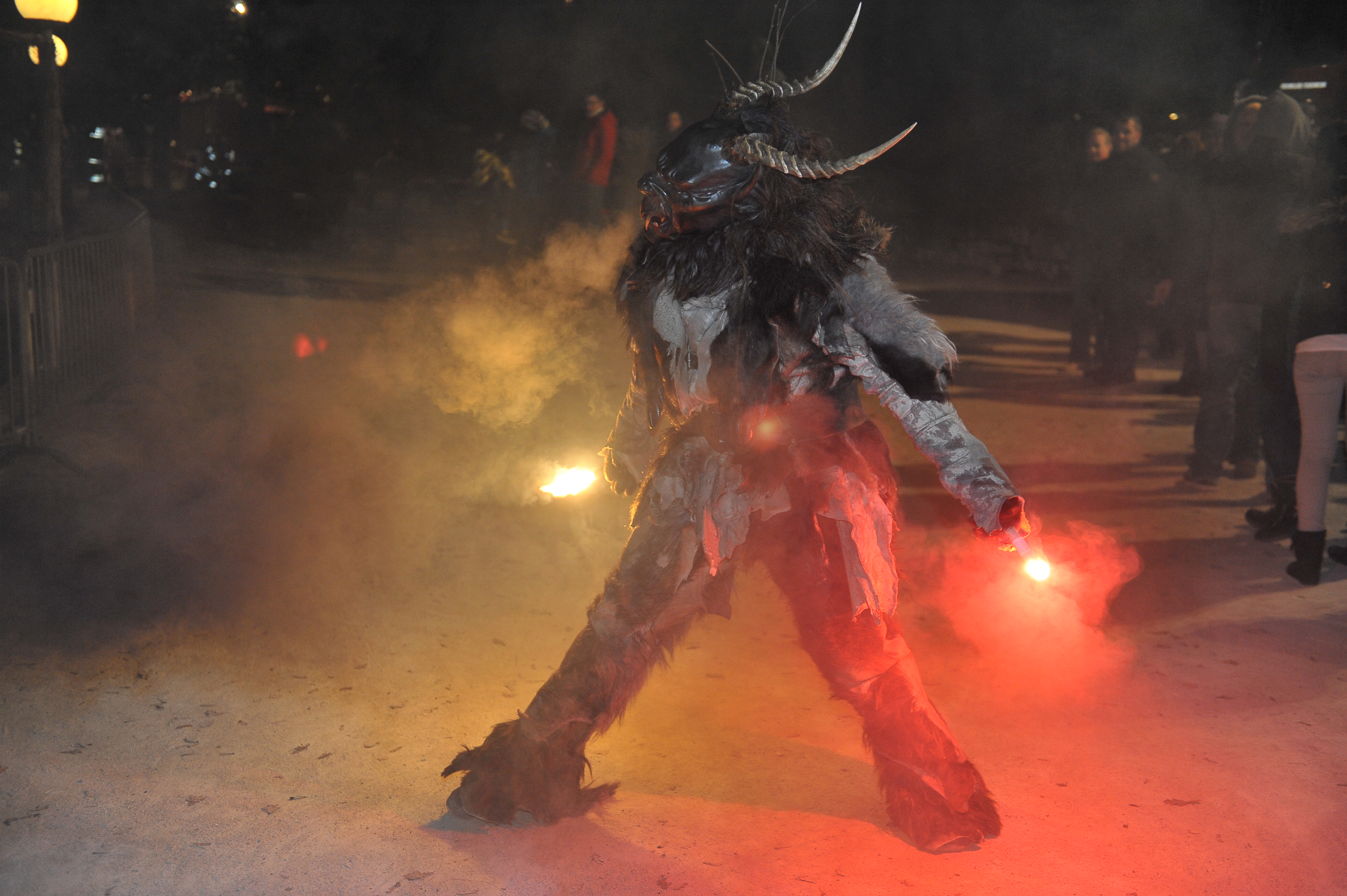
Krampus parade in Pörtschach am Wörthersee (2013)

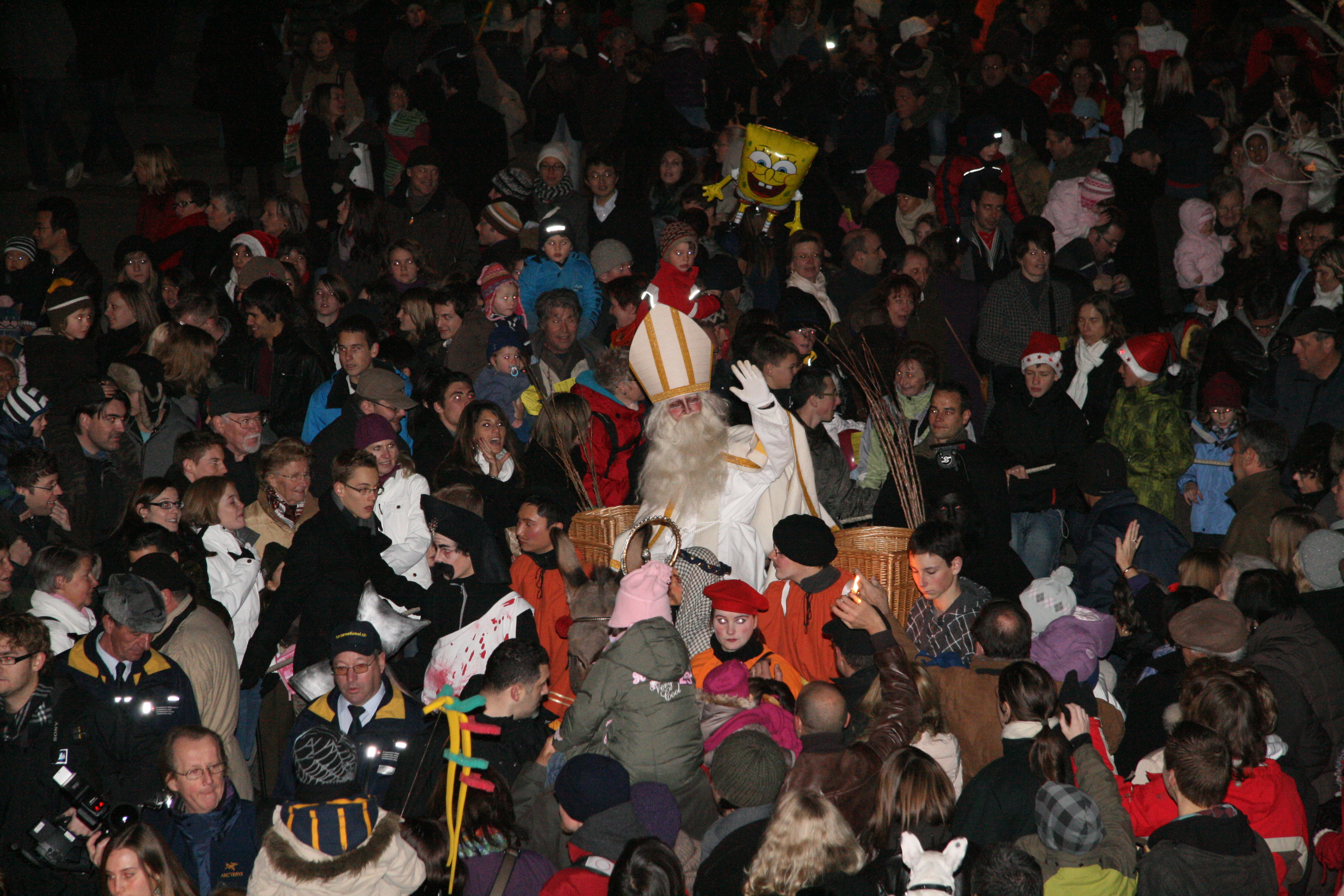
Nikolaus-Umzug in Fribourg, Switzerland (2009)

In Swiss folklore, Saint Nicholas is known as Samichlaus (like Dutch Sinterklaas a corruption of the name of Saint Nicholas). He is accompanied by the Schmutzli a frightening helper wearing a brown monk's habit. The Christmas gift-bringer is not Samichlaus, but the Christchindli.

==== Italy ====
Saint Nicholas (San Nicola) is the patron of the city of Bari, where it is believed he is buried. Its deeply felt celebration is called the Festa di San Nicola, held on 7–9 May. In particular on 8 May the relics of the saint are carried on a boat on the sea in front of the city with many boats following (Festa a mare). As Saint Nicholas is said to protect children and virgins, on 6 December there is a ritual called the Rito delle nubili: unmarried women wishing to find a husband can attend to an early-morning Mass, in which they have to turn around a column seven times. A similar tradition is currently observed in Sassari, where during the day of Saint Nicholas, patron of the city, gifts are given to young women who need help to get married.

In the provinces of Trieste, Udine, Belluno, Bari (Terlizzi and Molfetta), South Tyrol, Trentino and in the eastern part of the Province of Treviso, St. Nicholas (San Niccolò) is celebrated with gifts given to children on the morning of 6 December and with a fair called Fiera di San Niccolò during the first weeks of December. Depending on the cultural background, in some families this celebration is more important than Christmas.

Like in Austria, in South Tyrol Saint Nicholas comes with krampuses. Instead, in Val Canale (Udine) Saint Nicholas comes to chase the krampuses: after a parade of krampuses running after people, Saint Nicholas comes on a chariot and give gifts to children (Video "San Nicolò caccia i Krampus a Tarvisio" 6.12.2010)

==== Malta ====
Saint Nicholas (Maltese: San Nikola, less commonly San Niklaw) is the patron saint of the town of Siġġiewi where his feast is celebrated on the last Sunday in June, in addition to his regular feast day of 6 December. The parish church, dedicated to the saint, was built between 1676 and 1693. It was designed by the Maltese architect, Lorenzo Gafà, with the portico and naves being added by Nikola Zammit in the latter half of the 19th century. The ruins of a former parish church are still visible and have recently undergone restoration.

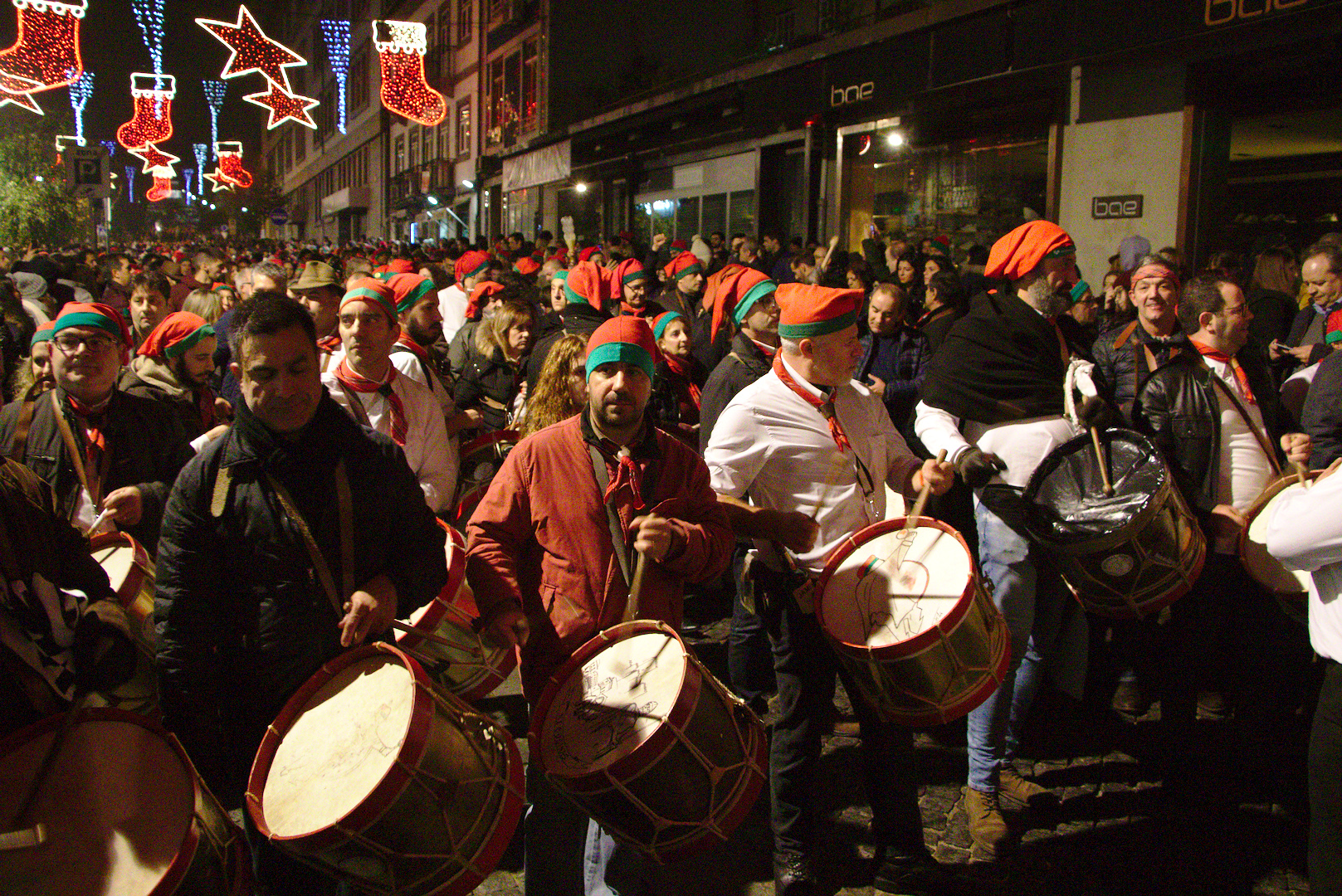
People celebrating the Pinheiro, one of the 8 festivities of the Nicolinas.

==== Portugal ====
In Portugal only the city of Guimarães has festivities directed to Saint Nicholas (São Nicolau), and it has been like that since the Middle Ages, because Saint Nicholas is deemed as the patron saint of the students of the city.

The collection of festivities in honor of Saint Nicholas are called Nicolinas, and they occur from 29 November to 7 December every year. These celebration are exclusive to this city, but bring people from all over the country to watch these centuries-old festivities, not seen anywhere else in the world.

==== Orthodox Slavic countries ====
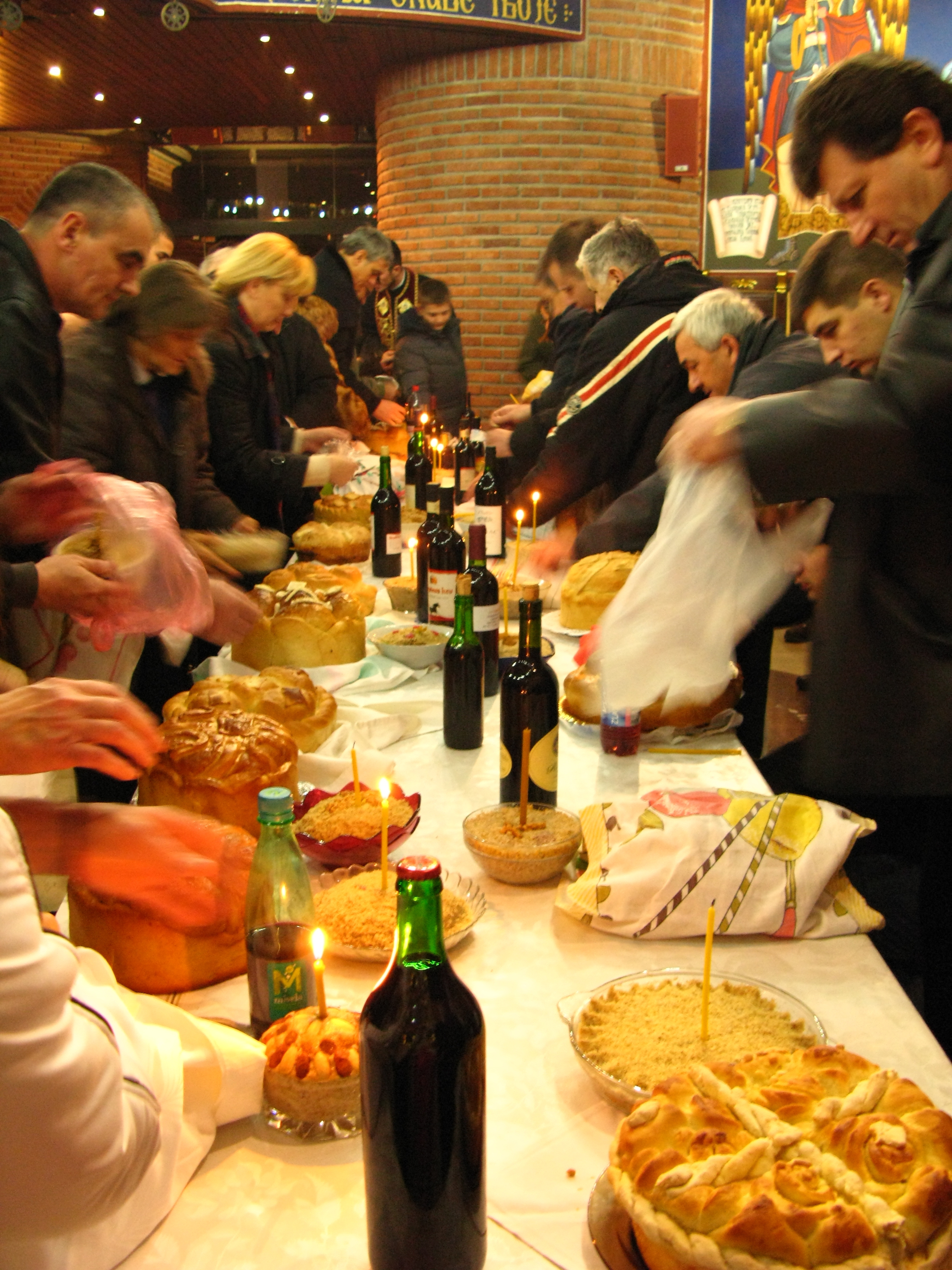
Celebration of Slavic cakes, grain and wine

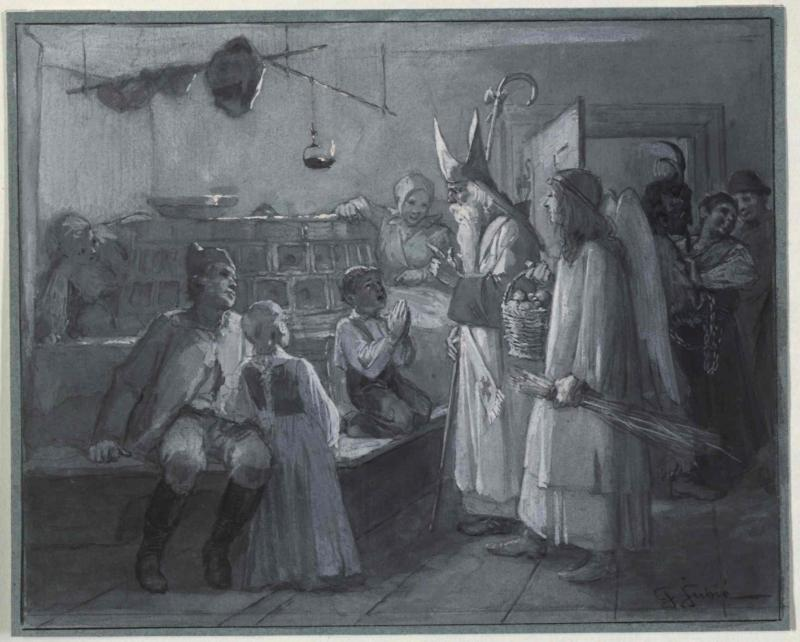
A depiction of Saint Nicholas and his companions visiting children

Nikoljdan (Serbian Cyrillic: Никољдан; Bulgarian: Никулден, romanized: Nikulden; Russian: Никола Зимний, romanized: Nikola Zimniy; Ukrainian: Cвятий Миколай, romanized: Sviatyy Mykolay) is the patron saint day (Krsna slava, or Krsno ime, a Serb tradition) of Saint Nicholas, celebrated on 6 December (Gregorian calendar, 19 December on Julian). Since the feast of Saint Nicholas always falls in the fasting period preceding the Christmas, the feast is celebrated according to the Eastern Orthodox Church fasting rules ("Post"). Fasting refers in this context to the eating of a restricted diet (no animal products or dairy products etc.), such as fish (see Eastern Orthodox fasting).

==== Spain ====
Saint Nicholas ("San Nicolás") is the patron of the city of Alicante. The Co-Cathedral of St. Nicholas of Bari is located there.

=== West Asia ===
==== Lebanon ====
Saint Nicholas is celebrated by all the Christian communities in Lebanon: Catholic, Greek Orthodox, and Armenian. Many places, churches, convents, and schools are named in honor of Saint Nicholas, such as Escalier Saint-Nicolas des Arts, Saint Nicolas Garden, and Saint Nicholas Greek Orthodox Cathedral.

=== North America ===
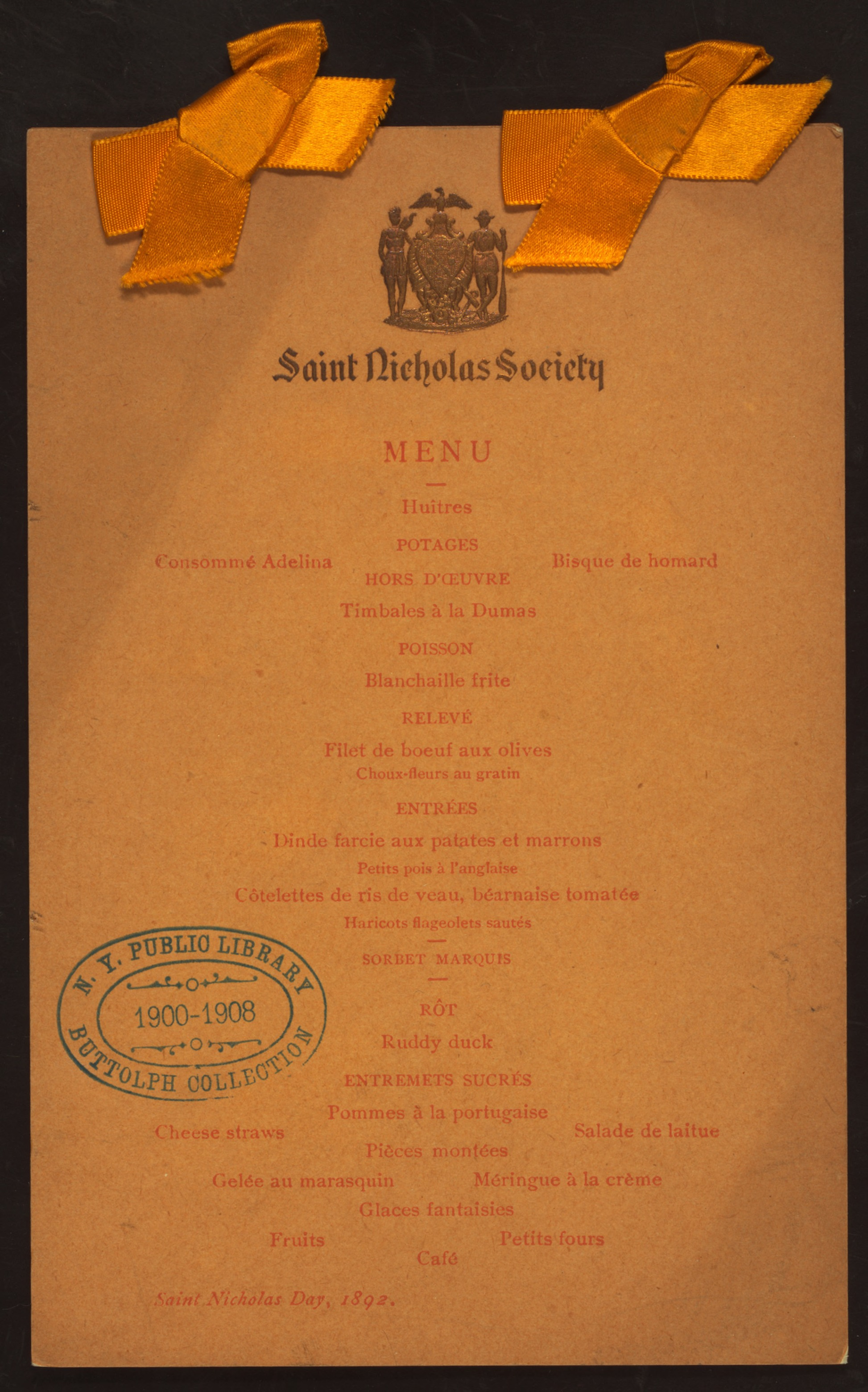
Saint Nicholas Day event held in 1892 by the Saint Nicholas Society

In the 17th century, Dutch Protestants who settled in New York brought the Sinterklaas tradition with them. While feasts of Saint Nicholas are not observed nationally, cities with strong German influences like Milwaukee, Wisconsin; Evansville, Indiana; Teutopolis, Illinois; Cincinnati, Ohio; Fredericksburg, Texas; Newport News, Virginia; St. Louis, Missouri; and Pittsburgh, Pennsylvania celebrate Saint Nicholas Day on a scale similar to the German custom.

Still practiced in some areas today, children place freshly polished shoes in front of doors, under windows, or at the foot of their beds before heading to bed. On the morning of 6 December, they find their shoes filled with gifts and sugary treats. Widespread adoption of the tradition has spread among the German, Polish, Belgian, and Dutch communities throughout the United States. Americans who celebrate Saint Nicholas Day generally also celebrate Christmas Day (25 December) as a separate holiday. Some of the traditions and rituals of Christmas, such as leaving out a stocking to be filled, are similar to the traditions of Saint Nicholas Day.

== See also ==
- Christmas gift-bringer
- Christkind
- Stutenkerl
