= Rue Gouraud =

Street in Beirut, Lebanon

- Interactive map of Rue Gouraud
- Location: Beirut, Lebanon
- Quarter: Gemmayzeh
- Coordinates: 33.895408°N 35.510234°E

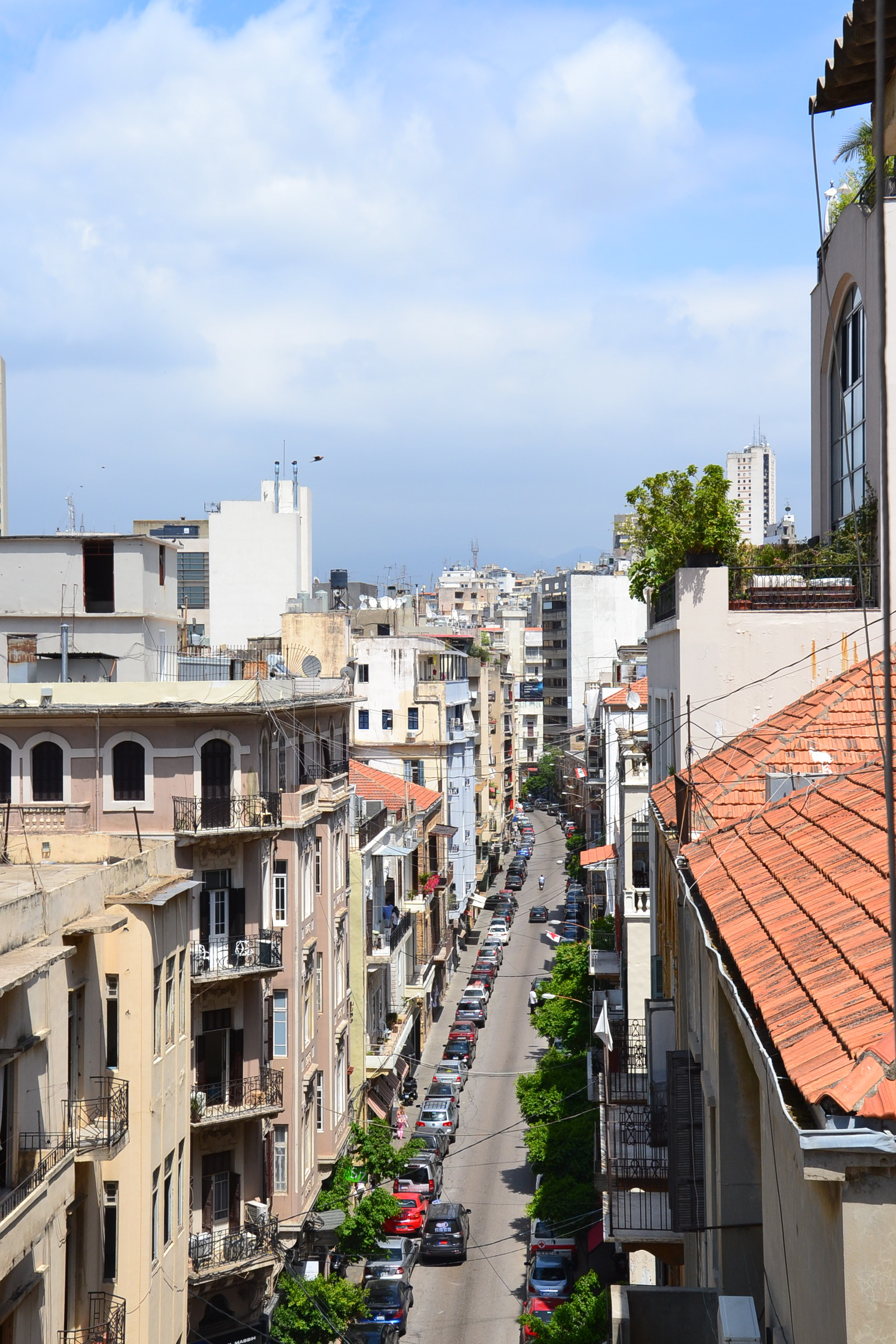
Typical Beiruti homes in an alley (زقاقة الدبس) near Rue Gouraud, Gemmayzeh

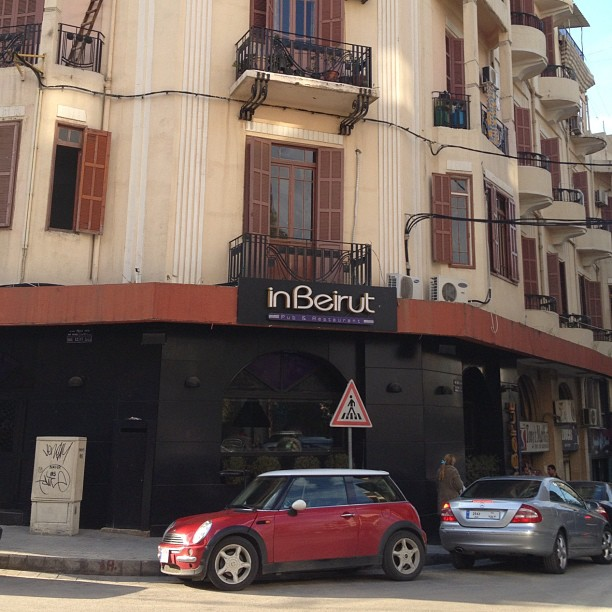
Modern pub in a Colonial-era building

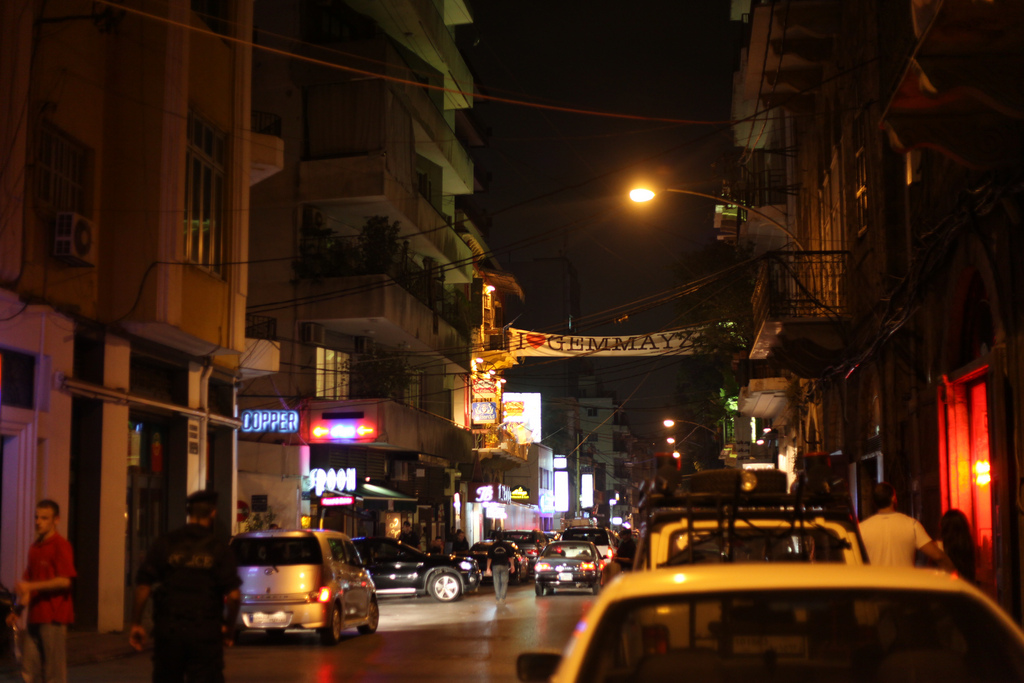
Typical night scene in Gemmayzeh

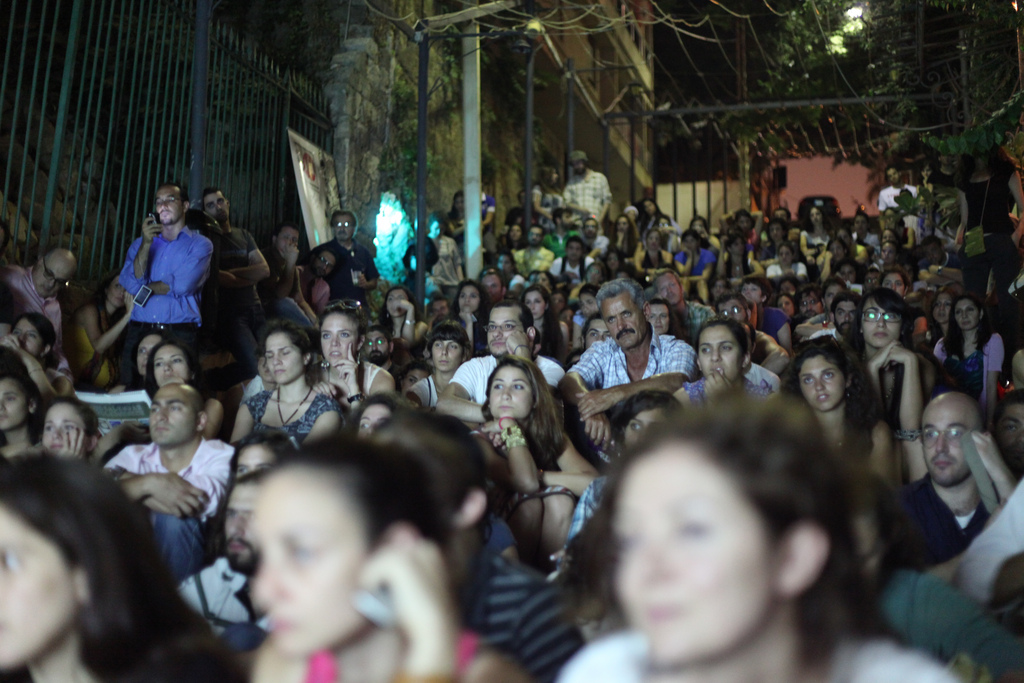
Public event on the Escalier de l'Art

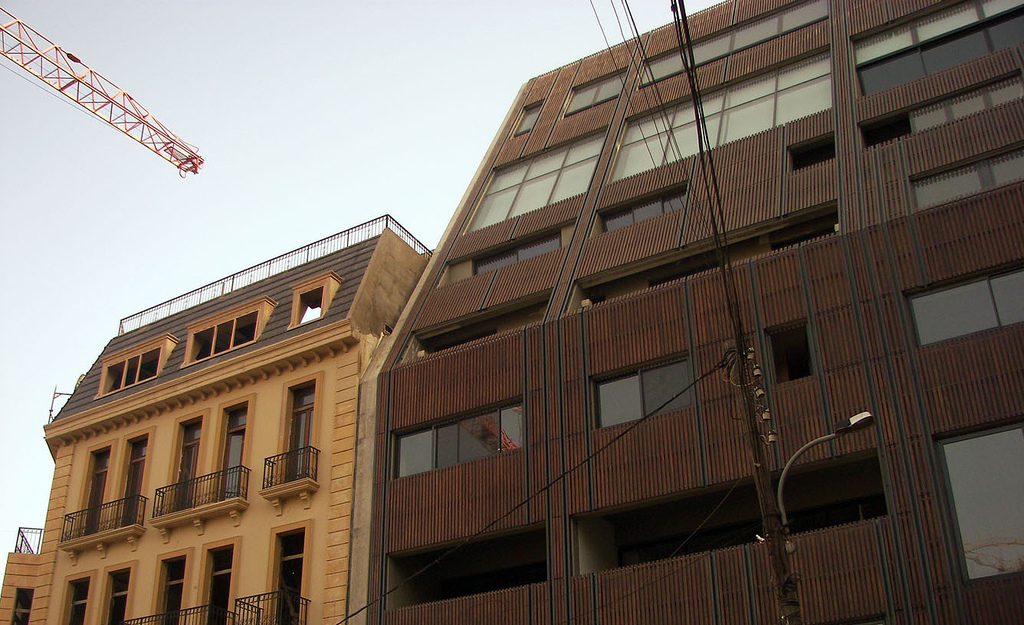
Modern and old architecture along the street

Rue Gouraud (Arabic: شارع غورو) is a mixed residential and commercial street in Gemmayzeh (الجميزة), a neighborhood in the Rmeil district of Beirut in Lebanon. It is named after French General Henri Gouraud. Gemmayzeh, and Rue Gouraud specifically, and competes with the trendy village-type neighborhood of Badaro, as one of Beirut's bohemian quarters. the district is full of narrow streets and historic buildings from the French era. The neighborhood is well known today for its trendy bars and pubs, cafes, restaurants and lounges, most of which are directly located on Rue Gouraud.

Rue Gouraud is known especially for its culinary scene that is popular with Beirut's fashionistas. The street runs east of Beirut Central District and the Saifi Village, extending from Avenue Georges Haddad and reaching the Corniche du Fleuve. In 2004, Travel + Leisure magazine dubbed the street "SoHo by the Sea", due to its colorful and chic cafés amid 1950s apartment buildings and hole-in-the-wall shops.

Adjacent to Rue Gouraud are the Saint Nicolas Stairs, also known as Escalier de l'Art, where art festivals are held every year. The stairs lead to Rue Sursock further to the South. The area is also within walking distance from Rue Monnot and the Saifi Village.

Rue Gouraud and the rest of Gemmayzeh were damaged extensively in the 2020 Beirut explosions, which destroyed many buildings.

== Gallery ==
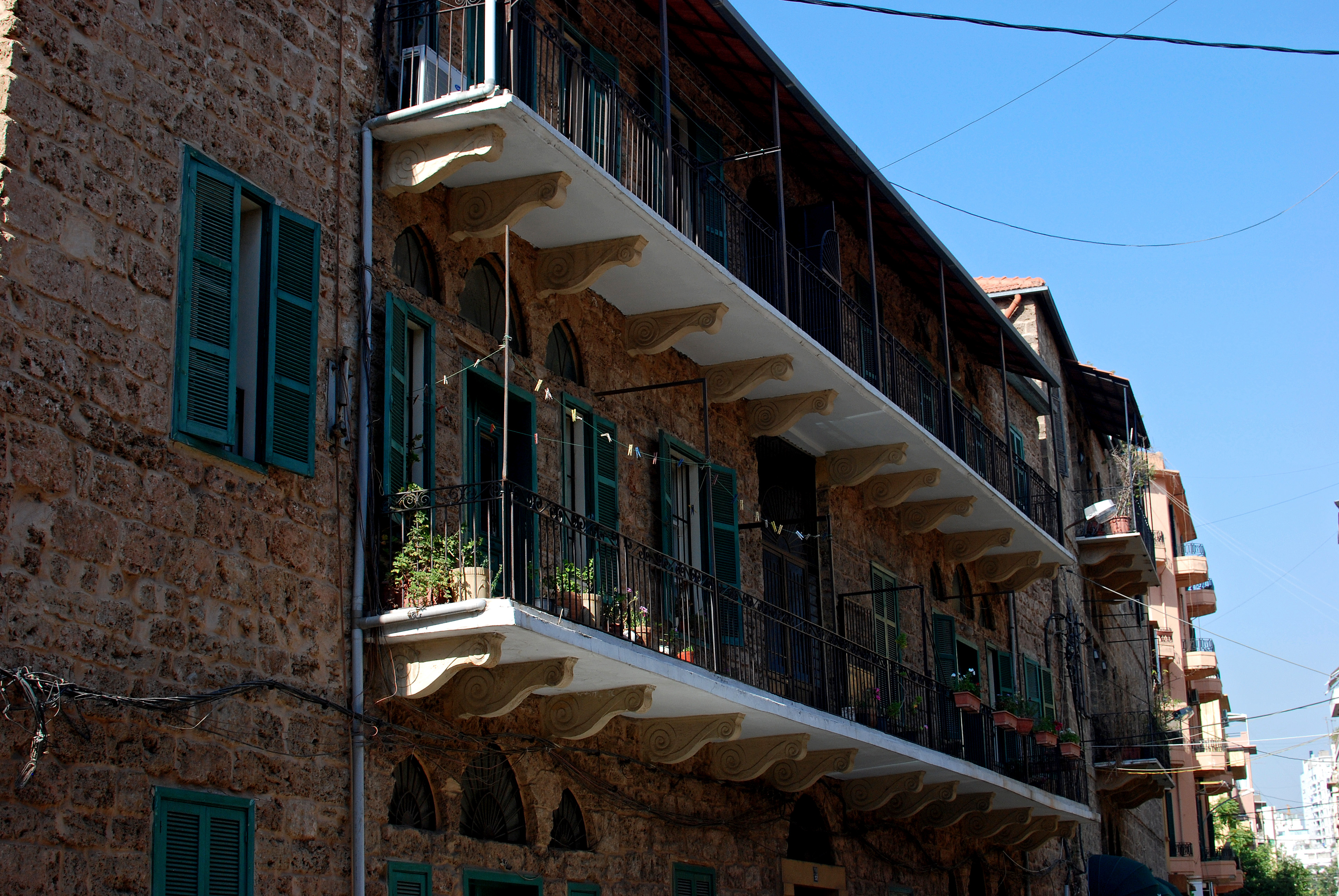

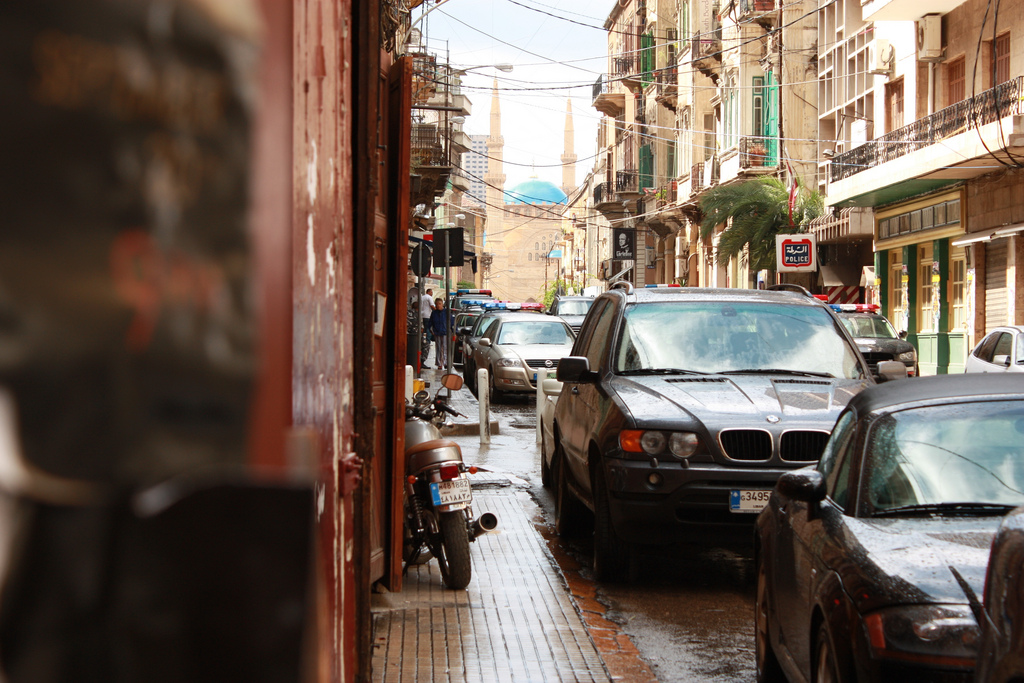

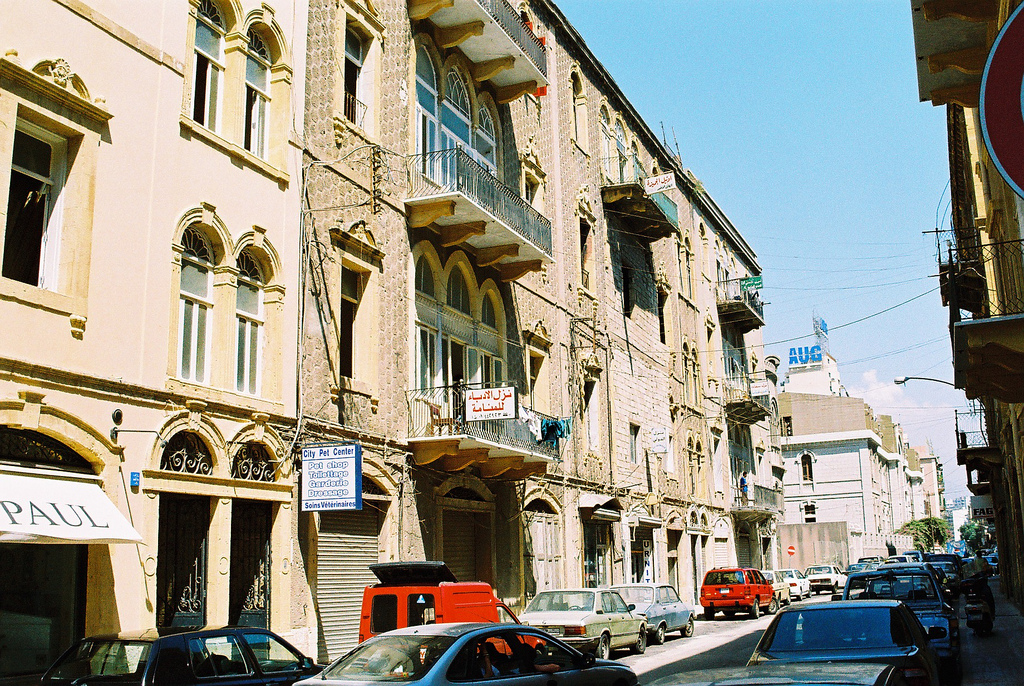
