= Escalier de l'Art =

Public stairway in Beirut, Lebanon

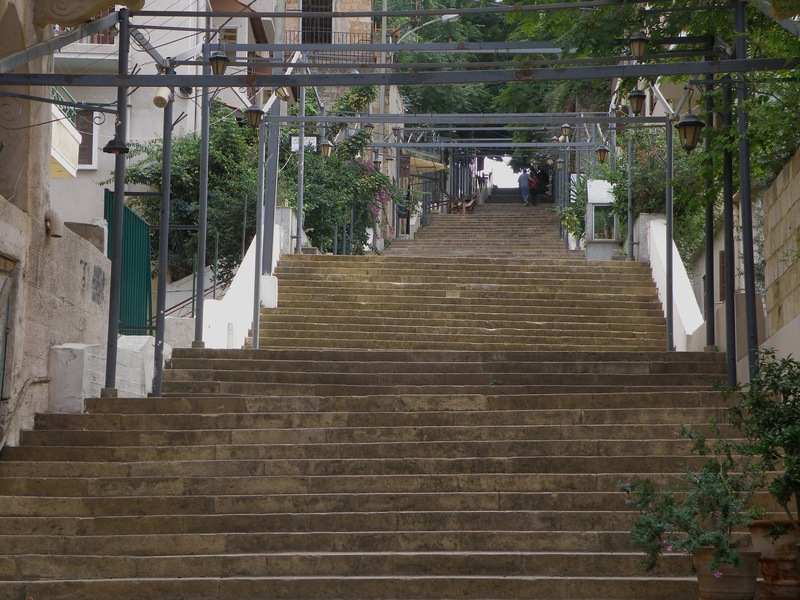

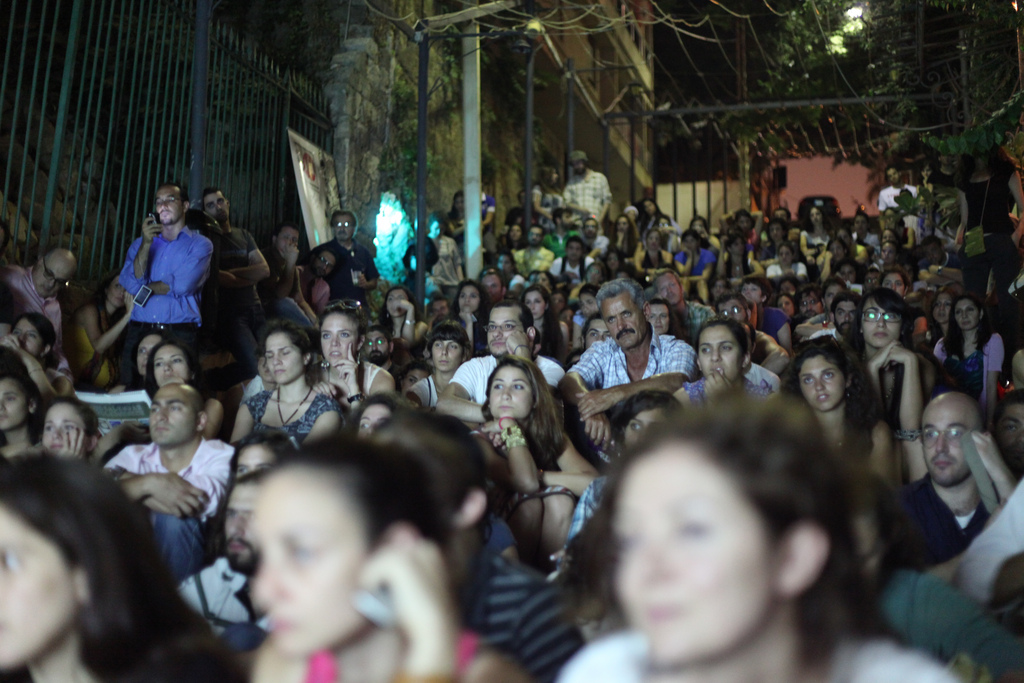
Public event on the Escalier de l'Art

L'Escalier de L'Art, also known as the L'Escalier de Saint-Nicolas, is a public stairway in Beirut, Lebanon. It is located in the Rmeil district, providing a pedestrian link between Rue Gouraud and Rue Sursock uphill. Its proximity to the Sursock Museum and the Greek Orthodox Archbishopric of Beirut on Rue Sursock, make the 125 steps and 500 meters span staircase, a popular destination.

== Open-air art exhibition ==
Since 1973, the stairs have been used as an open-air art exhibition site that occurs twice every year. While the official name of the "Montmartre-influenced" stairs is L'Escalier de Saint-Nicolas, the stairs are also referred to as L'Escalier de L'Art due to the Gemayze art exhibitions that take place on the stairs.
