= Nicholas Zammit =

Maltese doctor, architect and philosopher (1815–1899)

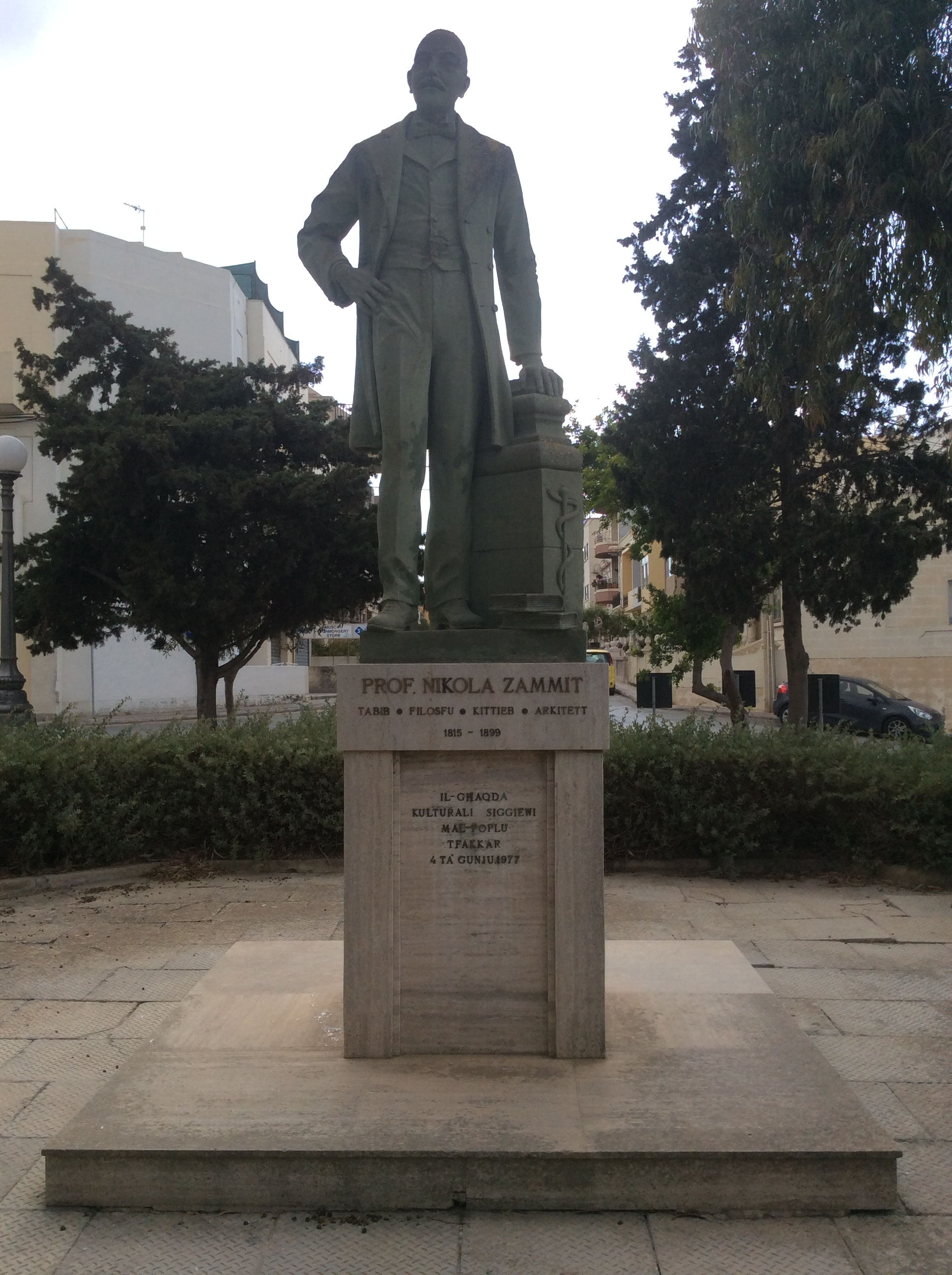
- Born: 20 November 1815; Siggiewi, Malta
- Died: 29 July 1899 (83 years); Sliema, Malta
- Occupations: Medicine, Architecture, Philosophy
- Spouse(s): Melita Schranz (marriage: Church of St. Paul Shipwreck, Valletta, 1852)
- Parent(s): John Nicholas Zammit and Vicenza née Vella

Nicholas Zammit (Maltese: Nikola Żammit; 1815–1899) was a Maltese medical doctor, an architect, an artistic designer, and a major philosopher. His area of specialisation in philosophy was chiefly ethics. Throughout his philosophical career he did not adhere to just one intellectual position. Roughly two-thirds into his life, Zammit passed from a liberal way of thinking to a conservative one. This does not mean that there are no carry-overs, developments, or continuations between the two phases, or that Zammit himself acknowledged such a division. Notwithstanding, the development suggests that an analysis of Zammit's works will reveal different attitudes, dispositions, emphasis, and conclusions of the two periods.

== Life ==
=== Beginnings ===
Zammit was born at Siġġiewi, Malta, on 29 November 1815, from John Nicholas Zammit and Vicenza (née Vella). He seems to have hailed from a well-established family, for he was given a good education, superior to that of other children in those days.

Later, Zammit entered the Royal University of Malta, at Valletta, to study medicine as a main subject. His subsidiary studies included Latin and Italian literature, philosophy, and architecture. All of these were subjects which Zammit continued to interest himself in throughout his life.

An incident which occurred in 1835 suggests that, as a university student, he was somewhat rowdy. Together with some of his classmates, he behaved badly, showed disrespect to some of his professors, and went as far as disrupting a graduation ceremony. The naughty lads were taken before the university council for a de moribus (literally, concerning behaviour) hearing. The council decided to expel Zammit and two of his pals from the university. However, subsequently, the punishment was commuted to one year postponement of their final exams. This suspension was upheld during the years 1838–39.

Zammit finished his university studies and won his colours as Doctor of Medicine in June 1839 at 23 years of age.

=== Liberal Phase (1838–1876) ===
==== First Writings ====
During the suspension year at the Royal University of Malta, Zammit might have composed and published a short tract entitled Pensieri Liberi di un Idiota sull'Interesse Mercantile ("Free Thoughts by an Idiot on the Interest in Merchandise").

During that same year (1838), up till around 1846, Zammit began contributing with some writings in Italian in Il Portafoglio Maltese (The Maltese Portfolio), a weekly paper issued by Paolo Sciortino.

Six years later, in 1845, Zammit left his home-town, Siggiewi, and went to live at the capital city of Malta, Valletta, the political and social centre of the island. During that same year, he began to contribute some articles in L'Unione (The Union). This was a weekly paper issued by an Italian political refugee, Luigi Zuppetta, and edited by Enrico Naudi. The paper had been begun to be produced that same year (for the duration of just twelve months), and supported Maltese popular representation in government.

The following year, in 1846, Zammit probably began contributing also in the other papers, such as Giahan (Jahan), a satirical weekly in Maltese edited by Richard Taylor.

During that same year, Zammit himself began issuing successively a three papers in Italian. The first, the fortnightly Il Foglio del Popolo (The People's Sheet), was begun on 27 June 1846. The second, issued for the first time on 1 August 1846, was called La Rivista (The Magazine), and was published monthly. The third, which was issued every ten days, was entitled La Fiammetta (The Little Torch), and was published for the first time on 9 September 1946.

Between 1848 and 1849, Zuppetta was also instrumental in issuing another weekly paper in Italian, Il Precursore (The Precursor), which was edited by Salvatore Cumbo, a Catholic priest. Zammit seems to have contributed some writings also to this paper.

All of these works must be considered to be the first writings of Zammit's liberal intellectual phase.

==== Zammit's Liberalism ====
Zammit showed a favourable disposition towards his contemporary times and ideas. Nevertheless, not without reservation. For instance, in spite of his attachment to people like Zuppetta – who was a member of Young Italy and an acquaintance of Giuseppe Mazzini – Zammit did not share these Italian refugees' anticlericalism. Nor did he think that any eventual opposition to the Church could help the Maltese cause to attain popular representation in government.

Zammit was la liberal Catholic. Like so many of his contemporaries, in mid-1846, at the time of the ascension to the Holy See of Pope Pius IX, which was seen as a choice in favour of liberalism, Zammit was overjoyed. Initially the pope did not disappoint him. He granted a general political amnesty, began an administrative, legal and financial reform of the Roman Curia, and relaxed Church censure. This looked promising enough. In 1848, the pope went as far as issuing a new constitution which took the unprecedented step of establishing a two-chamber parliament for the Papal States.

Lashing out at conservatives, Zammit proudly wore the pope's reforms like a feature in his cap. He mercilessly criticised the British colonial government in Malta, and was all out in favour of Italian unification (as the pope himself had been at the time). Zammit had no two minds that liberalism was 'the principle by which every free society should breath'.

With the 1848 revolutions throughout Europe, Pope Pius IX suddenly made a volte-face, vehemently opposing the Italian cause, and retracting most of the steps he had taken during the previous two years. Such a turnaround left people like Zammit in the cold. However, he still retained a strong belief in the Idea of Progress, political and social as much industrial, technological, scientific and artistic. Zammit wholeheartedly shared most of his contemporaries' enthusiasm for growth, development and advancement.

Zammit believed that liberalism – this champion of freedom and free enterprise – was by far the best tool to usher the forward stride of Progress.

==== Partnership with the British ====
Though somewhat disappointed with the pope, Zammit never succumbed to any anticlerical sentiments. Alternatively, he concentrated more on giving a push to the propitious wagon of Progress by beginning a long and close association with the British authorities in Malta. This was around 1849, when the British administration granted a Maltese elected popular representation in the council of government. To people with Zammit's frame of mind, this was enough to endorse British colonial rule.

On its part, government showed itself acquiescent to this new-found affection. In 1849, Zammit was appointed Assistant Superintendent and senior medical doctor of the local civil prisons at Corradino, Paola. He occupied this position for five years, up till 1854. During the same period, Zammit was also appointed Senior Supervisor of Aqueducts all over the Maltese islands.

Zammit's work with the British government included important projects which were intended to improve Malta's water supply and also the overall drainage system.

==== Teaching Career and more Publications ====
In the meantime, Zammit was also engaged with academic endeavours. Apart from lecturing at the Royal University of Malta at Valletta, he actively participated in meetings of intellectuals, artists or craftsmen. In 1864, for instance, he was chosen to be the first Deputy President of the Society for Sciences and Letters. Zammit's talk on the launching of the society was later published as Per l'Apertura della Società Maltese di Scienze e Lettere ("Opening of the Society for Sciences and Letters").

At the university, he lectured on philosophy, but also on other related subjects, such as art, architectural design, and technology.

In 1852, the same year in which – at 37 years of age – he married Melita Schranz (the sister of the renowned painter John Schranz) at the church of St. Paul's Shipwreck, Valletta, Zammit composed a work in Italian entitled Primo Sviluppo e Primi Progressi dell'Umana Cognizione ("The Basic Development and Early Development of Human Knowledge").

Through the next twenty years, Zammit published a string of publications which dealt with a number of topics (all reviewed below). Each publication is relevant in some way to the study of philosophy.

Some of these publications are religious in a social, and perhaps even anthropological, kind of way. These include Memorie del Centenario del Naufragio di San Paolo Apostolo ("Recollections of the Centenary of the Shipwreck of St. Paul Apostle"; 1858), Divota Novena ("Holy Novena"; 1868), and Il Transito Glorioso ("The Glorious Death"; 1872).

Other writings deal with industry, engineering and technological matters with a pronounced emphasis on social life and the environment, writings like Richerche Idrauliche ("Hydraulic Investigations"; 1855), Esposizione di Industria Maltese ("An Exposition of Maltese Industry"; 1864), Malte et son Industrie ("Malta and its Industries"1867), and Drenaggio ("The Drainage System"; 1875).

Some others are of an artistic nature, such as Angelica o La Sposa della Mosta ("Angelica or The Mosta Spouse"; 1861), and the periodical L'Arte ("Art"; 1862–66).

Finally, La Fenice ("The Phoenician") was another periodical which Zammit issued (1872–76), dealing with current affairs.

=== Conservative Phase (1876–1899) ===
==== Dean of the Faculty of Philosophy ====
In 1875, at the age of sixty, Zammit was appointed professor to hold the chair of philosophy at the Royal University of Malta. The promotion came into effect at the beginning of the following year. He succeeded the Italian, Nicola Crescimanno (1803–1885), a judge and philosopher who had fled to Malta to escape persecution after the unification of Italy, and who had been Dean since 1872.

This employment seems to have sealed Zammit's definitive abandonment of his liberal views. Of course, this did not come abruptly. Various writings from the liberal phase attest to budding doubts and almost imperceptible shifts of positions. Nevertheless, it appears that it was only now that the swing – for a swing it was, considering his early and latter intellectual positions – seemed to set wholly in place.

Zammit's work as Dean was characterised by a thorough commitment to his academic and intellectual responsibilities. Though the prevailing system taught there was the Thomistic one, Zammit sought to widen the horizon of studies to include an intelligent concern with contemporary issues, such as those related to technology, empirical sciences and art.

==== Zammit's Conservatism ====
During this latter intellectual phase, Zammit's liberalism gave way to a more pessimistic, unadventurous and polemical approach to modern ideas and events. Religion became more and more important in his writings. His attitude towards most modern philosopher became markedly negative and apologetic.

There seem to be a number of reasons to explain why Zammit's liberal period could not last. One might mention the definitive opposition of the Catholic Church, and particularly Pope Pius IX, to all types of liberalism. It would surely have been a rather delicate affair in those times for someone to try to reconcile liberalism and allegiance to the Church, especially in ultra-conservative Malta.

Besides, in Maltese society there was no class which vied for liberal reforms. The Church was satisfied with the status quo. The higher classes wanted a share of power for themselves, not universal franchise. The reforms reluctantly brought about by the British colonial government were piecemeal and only dictated by necessity. They were on the whole disinclined to share power with the locals.

The rest of the population was made up mostly of peasants who lacked an essential condition for class consciousness, that is, a basic sense of common interest and shared opposition to other groups. The lack of class consciousness on the part of the peasants could be seen in their resistance to reforms abrogating the wheat tax, through which they were subjected to an unfair payment of tax, suggested by the Royal Commissioner, F.W. Rowsell, in 1877. On the contrary, the peasants supported the richer members of society who stood to lose by the suggested reforms.

Zammit's alliance with the establishment is underlined by his occupation of the chair of philosophy at the university. To be elected to such a position, the approval of both the British authorities and the local ecclesiastical hierarchy was needed.

==== Academic and Intellectual Work ====
At the Royal University of Malta, Zammit was very much appreciated, and even loved, by the students. Of course, most of these hailed from the middle-upper and upper classes, and Zammit seems to have felt a sense of deep responsibility in guiding them to conserve those values which safeguarded the current social system. The main interest to which he draws his students' attention seems to have been the improvement of the current way of doing things, both politically and socially, rather than perceiving its unfairness and inequalities or, much less, changing it.

This can be seen in Zammit's writings such as Prolusione al Corso di Filosofija ("Inauguration of the Philosophy Course"; 1877), All'Occasione del Conferimento della Laurea ("For the Graduation Ceremony"; 1877), Al Rinnovamento del Corso Accademico di Filosofija 1879–82 ("For the Renewal of the Academic Course in Philosophy 1879–82"; 1879), Dio e la Suola ("God and Learning"; 1881), Dio e la Vita ("God and Life"; 1883), In Morte del Prof. Arciprete Antonio Albanese D.D. ("On the Death of Prof. Archpriest Antonio Albanese D.D."; 1885), and Alla Classe di Filosofia ("To the Philosophy Class"; 1886). Most, if not all, of these have a decidedly paternalistic attitude very congruous with the times, and bear to Zammit's positive abandonment of any liberal sentiments.

Whereas formerly Zammit had been very critical towards aristocrats, now he seemed to be propane in seeing them as the moral bulwark of society. This can be seen in writings such as La Contessa Maria Sonia Sciberras Bologna ("The Countess Maria Sonia Sciberras Bologna"; 1878), All'Occasione della Solenne Apertura del Conservatorio Vincenzo Bugeja ("On the Occasion of the Official Opening of the Vincenzo Bugeja Charitable Institution"; 1880), Di Francesco Saverio Schembri ("About Francesco Saverio Schembri"; 1880), and Il Conservatorio Vincenzo Bugeja ("The Vincenzo Bugeja Charitable Institution"; 1883).

In matters of religion, Zammit could not have become more conventional. In Ai Funerali di Pio IX ("For the Funeral of Pius IX"; 1878) he excused the pope for his failures. Moreover, when it came to religion Zammit seems to have chosen of take a within-the-walls stance, preferring now to look too much to the philosophical possibility that opposing views might have a point after all. In 1883, at his home-town, Siggiewi, Zammit founded the St. Nicholas Philharmonic Society.

=== Decline and death ===
After all his vicissitudes, it appears that Zammit did not seem to want to leave the world without giving voice to his beliefs and concerns. This he did in his final writing – and the magnum opus of his conservative intellectual phase – which he named Pensieri d'un Retrogrado ("Reflections of Old Hand"1888).

After published this tome, Zammit retained his post at the Royal University of Malta for two more years, up till 1890. He now had seventy-five years of age, and had been Dean for the last fifteen of those. Zammit was succeeded by Francis Bonnici.

On his retirement, as a sign of gratitude the British government granted Zammit an annual pension of a hundred pounds (considerable for those days). He spent his last years in relative withdrawal at his residence at Sliema, Malta.

He died at home on 29 July 1899 at the age of 83. His funeral procession began at Sliema and proceeded to Siggiewi, where he had been born, and laid to rest at the cemetery there. A journalist who was at the funeral later commented that, considering the stature of the deceased, 'too few people, walking silently, accompanied the coffin'.

== Writings ==
Zammit's writings are more or less all relevant for the study and appreciation of his philosophy. The major ones, of course, take pride of place. Nevertheless, all the others should not be discarded, as they offer glimpses, something quite important, into the mind and personality of the philosopher.

=== Major writings ===
- Per l'Apertura della Società Maltese di Scienze e Lettere ("Opening of the Society for Sciences and Letters"; 1864). – Printed at the Albion Press, Malta, and containing 35 pages, this little tract might stand as a typical composition relative to Zammit's liberal phase. The work reproduces the talk which Zammit gave at the launching of the said society on 22 October 1864. In the address, Zammit gave a positive account of the arts and sciences of his times. Art and science were responsible for the qualitative improvement man experienced in modern times, he states. Zammit pointed out to the need that science should always be considered in connection with industry. He stressed that academia should not be just intellectual clubs, but should also give a positive contribution to society. In the discourse, on can find a lot of empiricist and utilitarian innuendoes.

British influence emerges in Zammit's expressed admiration towards the British political and economic systems and way of life. In politics, Zammit favoured an empiricist 'down to earth' approach, rather than any hazy political idealism or utopianism. He showed an empiricist dislike of theory, possessing a favourable disposition towards men of action.

In positivist fashion, Zammit attributed Britain's dominant economic and political position to its industries.

Zammit also regarded favourably French intellectuals. Together with their British counterparts, they are labelled 'enlightened' because, Zammit insists, they helped man in his technological and intellectual progress.

In his discourse, Zammit also talked in upbeat terms about popular democracy. Arts and sciences, he says, should have a popular and democratic function. Zammit stated that one of the aims of literature is to prepare people for plebiscite. It is clear that his liberal assumptions led him to believe in the people's ability to make good, rational judgements, thus maintaining the possibility of improving social and political situations. He claimed that literature should be a connecting link between people and their intellectuals, rather than something reserved to some elite.

With regards to the thinkers mentioned in the talk, Aristotle has none of the respect he shall later enjoy in Zammit's conservative phase, as can be seen, for instance, in Pensieri d'un Retrogrado. Indeed, Aristotle's legacy is considered as a grudge. Science could only develop, Zammit maintains, by freeing itself from it.

Zammit was also for the reconciliation of religion and science. In this respect, it is also important to note that in this talk religion does not feature as much as it does in his later, conservative works.

- Pensieri d'un Retrogrado ("Reflections of an Old Hand"; 1888) – Published by Tipografia Industriale of Giovanni Muscat, Malta, the book contains 425 pages of packed text. The composition represents the height of Zammit's thought relative to his conservative intellectual phase. St. Augustine takes pride of place when it comes to the intellectual sources of the work, calling for a revival of his philosophical approach.

In the book, Zammit deals with some 125 different themes divided in five groups of a more or less philosophical, moral, social, scientific/literary, and Christian nature.

In the introduction, Zammit states that arrivati a conclusioni impossibili, rigettate le tradizioni della verità non si può più che fermarsi, che retrocedere per progredire. Rinnegare il passato per un presente che non lo vale ed un futuro che minaccia, accettare una luce che acceca è una stoltezza nella civiltà ('having come to impossible conclusions, refusing the traditions of truth, it cannot be otherwise that we stop, that we retreat in order to advance. Refusing the past for a worthless present and a threatening future, embracing a blinding light, is madness for society). The book, Zammit declares, ci ricordi modestamente i nostri errori, le nostre speranze e i nostri destini (modestly reminds us of our errors, our hopes, and out destinies).

Zammit demonstrates an uncommon intensity throughout the work. He writes with conviction and persuasiveness, almost provocation. Nevertheless, the book, though formally complex, lacks unity. It seems that the various parts were put together sporadically. Sometimes there is no attempt at giving them some kind of amalgamated unified form. Nevertheless, the work as a whole is staggering. It deals with natural philosophy, metaphysics, the decadent nature of modern humans, the passions, and so many other themes.

Despite its depth, in general the work contains little philosophical originality. Its uniqueness seems to lie in its transitory nature; in upholding and advocating, that is, a change from a scholastic way of looking at philosophy and the world to the perspective championed by St. Augustine.

Nevertheless, the main thrust of Zammit's book is destructive. In line with other early and mid-19th century Christian apologists, he might indeed be called 'irrational'. Not because he denies man's rational nature or capacities, but rather because he denies any claim that rationality may provide a sufficient explanation of humans' ability to arrive at theoretical or moral heights through his own rational powers.

Still, Zammit's work has characteristics which differentiate him from that of other 19th century apologists and draws him nearer to the neo-Scholastic way of thinking.

=== All writings in chronological order ===
It would be a mistake to study Zammit by reading just one single publication of his, namely the Pensieri d'un Retrogrado, as is commonly done. This will only provide a distorted view of the man's philosophy. Furthermore, even if it represents his thought during the final part of his life, it surely excludes his whole liberal phase completely. The list below includes all known works by Zammit. It should serve at least as an indication of the historically broad spread of his writings.

1. 1838 – Pensieri Liberi di un Idiota sull'Interesse Mercantile (Free Thoughts by an Idiot on the Interest in Merchandise) – Attributed
2. 1838–46 – Various contributions to Il Portafoglio Maltese (The Maltese Portafolio)
3. 1845–46 – Various contributions to L'Unione (The Union)
4. 1846–48 – Various contributions to Giahan (Jahan)
5. 1846 – Il Foglio del Popolo (The People's Sheet)
6. 1846–48 – La Rivista (The Magazine)
7. 1846 –La Fiammetta (The Little Torch)
8. 1848–49 – Various contributions to Il Precursore (The Precursor)
9. 1852 – Primo Sviluppo e Primi Progressi dell'Umana Cognizione (The Basic Development and Early Development of Human Knowledge).
10. 1855 – Richerche Idrauliche (Hydraulic Investigations)
11. 1858 – Memorie del Centenario del Naufragio di San Paolo Apostolo (Recollections of the Centenary of the Shipwreck of St. Paul Apostle)
12. 1861 – Angelica o La Sposa della Mosta (Angelica or The Mosta Spouse)
13. 1862–66 – L'Arte (Art)
14. 1864 – Esposizione di Industria Maltese (An Exposition of Maltese Industry)
15. 1864 – Per l'Apertura della Società Maltese di Scienze e Lettere (Opening of the Society for Sciences and Letters)
16. 1867 – Malte et son Industrie (Malta and its Industries)
17. 1868 – Divota Novena (Holy Novena)
18. 1872 – Il Transito Glorioso (The Glorious Death)
19. 1872–76 – La Fenice (The Phoenician)
20. 1875 – Drenaggio (The Drainage System)
21. 1877 – Prolusione al Corso di Filosofija (Inauguration of the Philosophy Course)
22. 1877 – All'Occasione del Conferimento della Laurea (For the Graduation Ceremony)
23. 1879 – Al Rinnovamento del Corso Accademico di Filosofija 1879–82 (For the Renewal of the Academic Course in Philosophy 1879–82)
24. 1878 – La Contessa Maria Sonia Sciberras Bologna (The Countess Maria Sonia Sciberras Bologna)
25. 1878 – Ai Funerali di Pio IX (For the Funeral of Pius IX)
26. 1880 – All'Occasione della Selonne Apertura del Conservatorio Vincenzo Bugeja (On the Occasion of the Official Opening of the Vincenzo Bugeja Charitable Institution)
27. 1880 – Di Francesco Saverio Schembri (About Francesco Saverio Schembri)
28. 1881 – Dio e la Suola (God and Learning)
29. 1883 – Il Conservatorio Vincenzo Bugeja (The Vincenzo Bugeja Charitable Institution;)
30. 1883 – Dio e la Vita (God and Life)
31. 1885 – In Morte del Prof. Arciprete Antonio Albanese D.D. (On the Death of Prof. Archpriest Antonio Albanese D.D.)
32. 1886 – Alla Classe di Filosofia (To the Philosophy Class)
33. 1888 – Pensieri d'un Retrogrado (Reflections of an Old-Hand)

== Works of structural engineering and artistic design ==
Zammit was very much involved with commissions of design. Invariably, these were contracted by religious circles. Though some of them entailed relatively small, minor embellishments and adornments, others, such as the architectonic assignments, comprised large tasks.

=== Churches ===
All of the following churches are situated in Malta. It is as yet unknown whether Zammit was ever commissioned to work on other churches abroad.

- Façade of the church of St. Catherine, Zurrieq (1861)
- Naves and portico of the church of St. Nicholas, Siggiewi (1862)
- Structural alterations to the church of Our Lady of Graces, Zabbar (1875)
- Façade of the church of St. Publius, Floriana (1885)
- Façade of the church of St. Paul Shipwreck, Valletta (1886)
- Restoration of the church of St. Peter, Marsaxlokk
- Plan and design for the church of Our Lady of Victories, Naxxar – Unimplemented

=== Memorials ===
Unfortunately, a complete and detailed list of the following is as yet unavailable.

- Plan and design of various memorial or funerary chapels at the Addolorata Cemetery, Paola, Malta.

=== Artistic design ===
Regrettably, this list here is almost certainly not exhaustive.

- The frontal for the major altar, the canopy, the ceiling decorations, the floor adornment, and all the festive liturgical paraphernalia at the church of the Immaculate Conception, Cospicua
- The festive pillar for the statue of Pope Pius IX, Cospicua
- The floor adornment at the church of St. Catherine of Alexandria, Zejtun
- The canopy, the festive liturgical paraphernalia, and the choir stalls at the church of St. George, Qormi
- The main canopy at the cathedral of the archbishop, Mdina
- The frontal for the major altar, and various items of the festive liturgical paraphernalia at the church of St. Nicholas, Siggiewi
- The triumphal arch for St. Paul's Street, Valletta, for the XVIII centenary of St. Paul's Shipwreck (1858) – Not in use any more
- The coat of arms of various villages, towns and cities around Malta and Gozo– most still in use today by the local councils of Malta
- Good Friday catafalque at the church of the Franciscans, Valletta (1870)
- The pulpit for the church of St. Michael, Mqabba

== Appreciation ==
Within philosophical circles, Zammit has been sometimes taken lightly. This has been mainly due to the fact that most are only acquainted to his Pensieri d'un Retrogrado. Indeed, reading this work without any or scant knowledge of the rest of his literary output cannot but thoroughly distort Zammit's philosophical output and significance. Both his liberal and conservative phases must be taken into consideration to form a balanced and holistic view of his philosophy.

To date, a methodical and comprehensive appreciation of Zammit's philosophy has still not been done. Though the research and studies of Jimmy Xerri and Michael Grech come close, they might still have lacked a consideration of Zammit's philosophy in its entirety.

Zammit's broad knowledge and philosophy engage contemporary philosophers in avid and productive discussions.

== See also ==
- Philosophy in Malta
