= Bonnici =

Bonnici (pronounced [bɔˈnːiːt͡ʃɪ]) is a Maltese surname. Notable people with the surname include:

- Brittany Bonnici (born 1997), Australian rules footballer
- Carmelo Mifsud Bonnici (born 1960), Maltese politician who served in a number of Ministerial posts in the Government of Malta
- Francis Bonnici (1853–1905), Maltese educationist, philanthropist and a minor philosopher
- Giuseppe Mifsud Bonnici (1930–2019), Maltese retired Chief Justice, and minor philosopher
- James Bonnici (born 1972), American former professional baseball player
- John S. Bonnici (born 1965), American prelate of the Roman Catholic Church
- Karmenu Mifsud Bonnici (1933–2022), Maltese politician
- Owen Bonnici (born 1980), Maltese politician
- Paula Mifsud Bonnici, Maltese politician
- Sarah Bonnici (born 1998), Maltese singer
- Ugo Mifsud Bonnici (born 1932), Maltese politician

== See also ==
- Bonici (disambiguation)
