= Bonici =

Bonici is a Maltese surname, and may refer to:

== People ==
- Giuseppe Bonici (1707–1779), Maltese architect
- Sharon Ellul-Bonici, Maltese politician

== Places ==
- Villa Bonici, Sliema, Malta
- Palazzo Gregorio Bonici

== See also ==
- Bonnici, a surname
