= Saint Nicolas Garden =

The Saint Nicolas Garden is a public garden located on Avenue Charles Malek in the Tabaris neighborhood of the Rmeil District, one of Beirut's largest. The garden that opened in 1964 was designed by the Lebanese architect, Ferdinand Dagher. The area of the garden is 22,000 square metres (240,000 ft^{2}). The garden, which faces the Greek Orthodox Cathedral of Saint Nicolas, was also named in honor of Saint Nicolas.
