= Pio IX =

Municipality of Pio IX Município de Pio IX
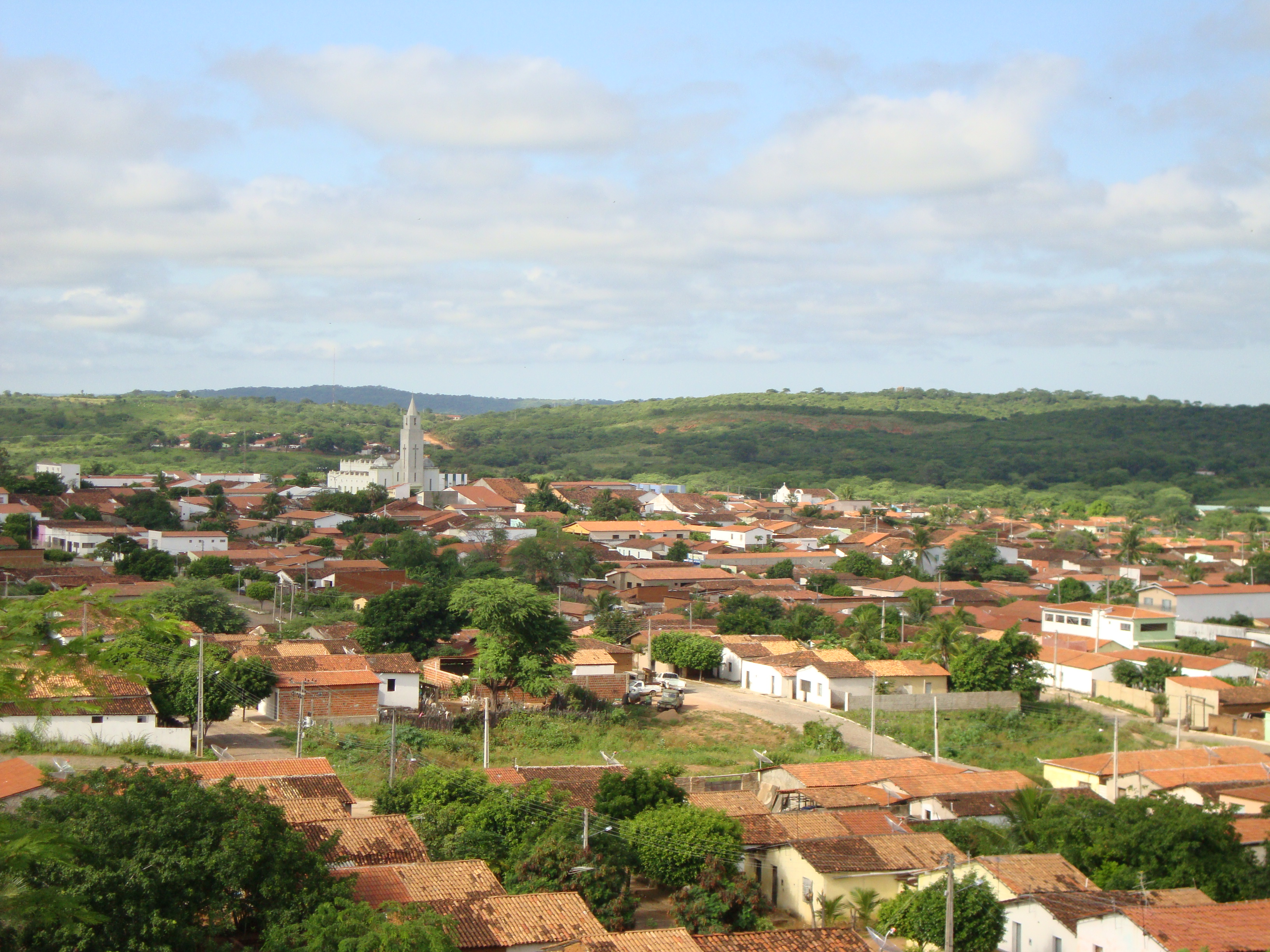

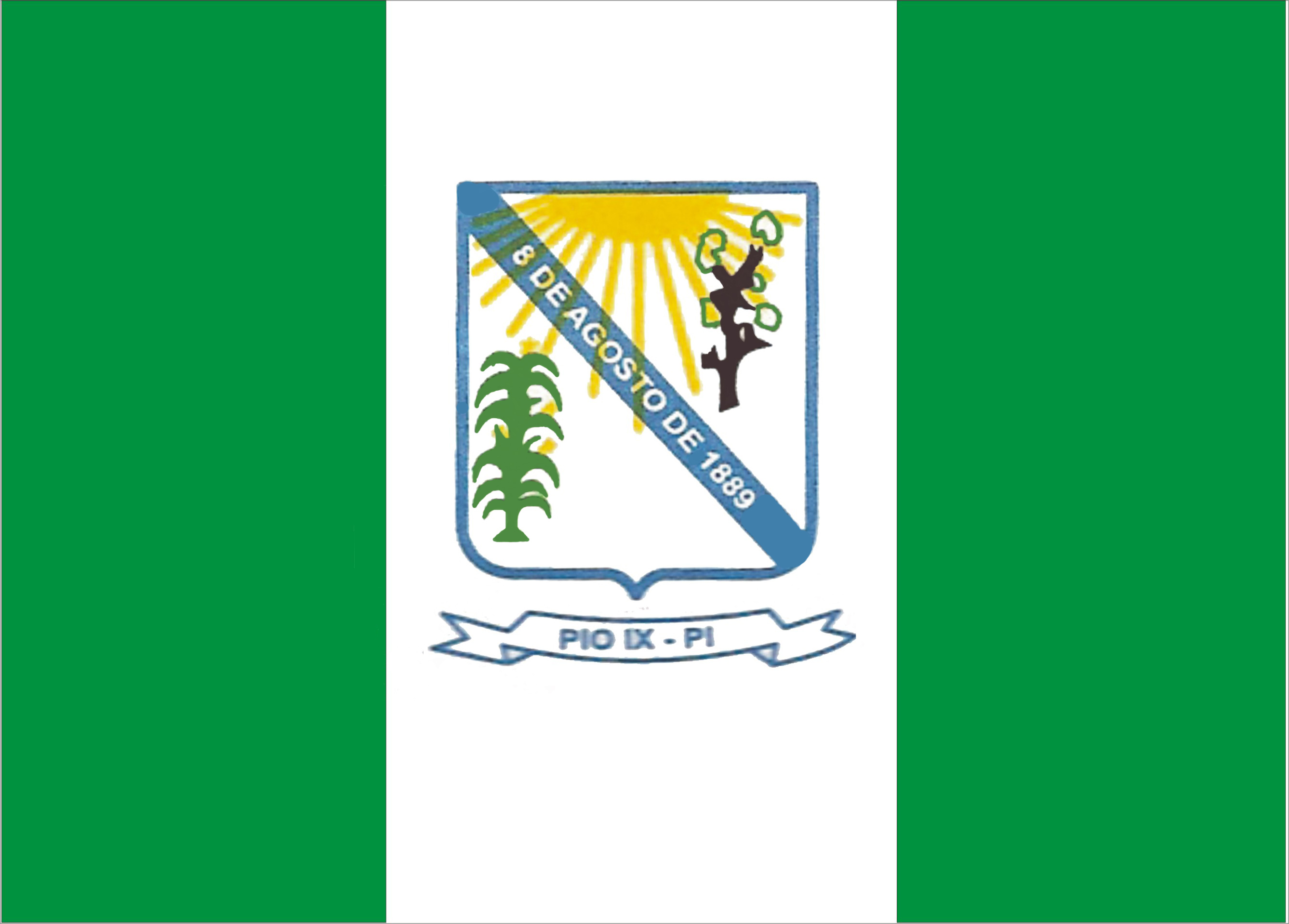
- Flag Coat of arms

- Location in Piauí and Brazil
- Coordinates: 06°50′16″S 40°34′44″W
- Country: Brazil
- Region: Northeast
- State: Piauí
- Settled: January 1, 1939

Government
  - Mayor: Jose Mesquita Viana de Andrade (PSDB)

Area
  - Total: 1,948.843 km^{2} (752.452 sq mi)
- Elevation: 495 m (1,624 ft)

Population (2020)
  - Total: 18,459
  - Density: 8.6/km^{2} (22/sq mi)
- Time zone: UTC−3 (BRT)
- HDI (2000): 0.572 – medium

Pio IX is the easternmost city in the Brazilian state of Piauí. The city is named after Pope Pius IX.
