= Rue Sursock =

Historic street in Beirut, Lebanon

Coordinates: 33.893°N 35.513°E

Rue Sursock is a historic street in the Rmeil district of Beirut in Lebanon. Named after one of Beirut's most prominent families, the Sursock family, the street is home to many of Beirut's beautiful historic mansions that were built in the 18th and 19th centuries by aristocratic families, such as the Sursock and Bustros families. A large gate used to close down Rue Sursock at 10 pm, and this tradition remained until 1945.

There used to be more than thirty mansions and villas on Rue Sursock, but most of them were replaced with modern apartment buildings. The Palais de Bustros (Bustros Palace) is one of the largest of the palaces on Rue Sursock and now houses the Ministry of Foreign Affairs and Emigrants. The street is also home to the Sursock Palace and the Nicolas Sursock Museum. Rue Sursock is known to be the most expensive residential Christian area in Lebanon. It is resided by the wealthiest Christian families in Lebanon.
