= Francis Bonnici =

19th-century Maltese philosopher and priest

The Reverend Canon Francis Bonnici

Orders
- Ordination: 1876

Personal details
- Born: July 14, 1853 Cospicua, Malta
- Died: December 24, 1905 (aged 52) Malta
- Occupation: Philosophy
- Education: University of Malta

Francis Bonnici (July 14, 1853 – December 24, 1905) was a Maltese educationist, philanthropist and a minor philosopher. In philosophy he mostly specialised in pedagogy.

== Life ==
Bonnici was born in Cospicua, Malta, on July 14, 1853. However, when still very young, his family moved to Mqabba. He graduated as Doctor of Theology from the University of Malta in 1872 and was ordained priest in 1876. He taught languages for many years at the bishop’s major seminary at Mdina, and was Rector at the bishop’s minor seminary at Floriana. He was nominated a canon of the bishop’s cathedral chapter in 1882.

Throughout the years, Bonnici endeavoured to create institutions of Christian charity. In 1884 he founded a popular educational itinerary mission for children, and in 1888 he began a shelter for homeless boys at Ħamrun, where it also had a small printing press for educational purposes. Bonnici further founded a congregation of Brothers of Charity to keep up his work at the shelter. Moreover, he also founded a crèche for homeless babies.

Despite his hard and wide pastoral work, Bonnici engaged himself in serious study, both of theology and philosophy. In 1890 he was appointed Professor of the Chair of Philosophy at the University of Malta, an office he held for ten years, up till 1900. During the last two years of his life, he was very ill, having spent all his energies in indefatigable work. He was only fifty-three years of age when he died on December 24, 1905. Though he was buried at the Mdina cathedral, his body was later transferred to the Boys’ Shelter in Ħamrun.

== Works ==
Bonnici’s philosophical writings do not seem to be many. Nevertheless, one composition stands out from the rest. It is his 1893 pamphlet La Pedagogia e la Filosofia (Pedagogy and Philosophy), printed at his own printing press in Ħamrun by his homeless boys (Tipografia della Casa di S. Giuseppe). The work is in Italian, and is made up of 22 pages. The writing has no divisions or parts. In fact, it is an address which Bonnici delivered at the Malta National Library in Valletta on October 2, 1893, on the occasion of the opening of the academic year 1893/94 for public schools. Bonnici dedicated the work to his parents and teachers. In it he deals with the relation between the philosophy of education and the theory of education (pedagogy). Bonnici sustains his views with philosophical arguments and submits to the idea that education is the root to all progress.
