= Rmeil =

Quarter of Beirut

Coordinates: 33°54′N 35°31′E

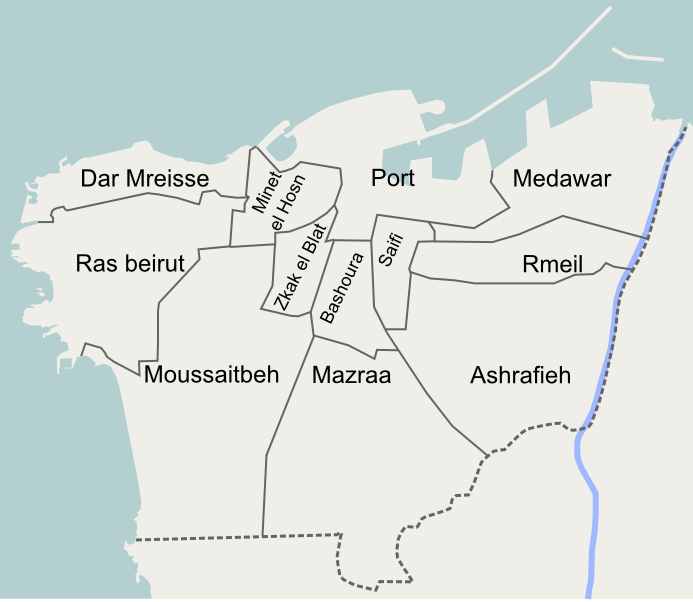
Beirut's districts.

Rmeil (Arabic: الرميل, romanized: ar-Rmayl) is one of the neighborhoods of Beirut, the capital of Lebanon. It is located near Ashrafieh, Medawar and Saifi. The neighborhood is known for its Greek Orthodox churches such as Saint Georges and Saint Nicolas. Cultural areas are located in Rmeil, like the Sursock Museum.

The neighborhood is also home to important hospitals, from the Saint George Hospital University Medical to the Geitawi Hospital.

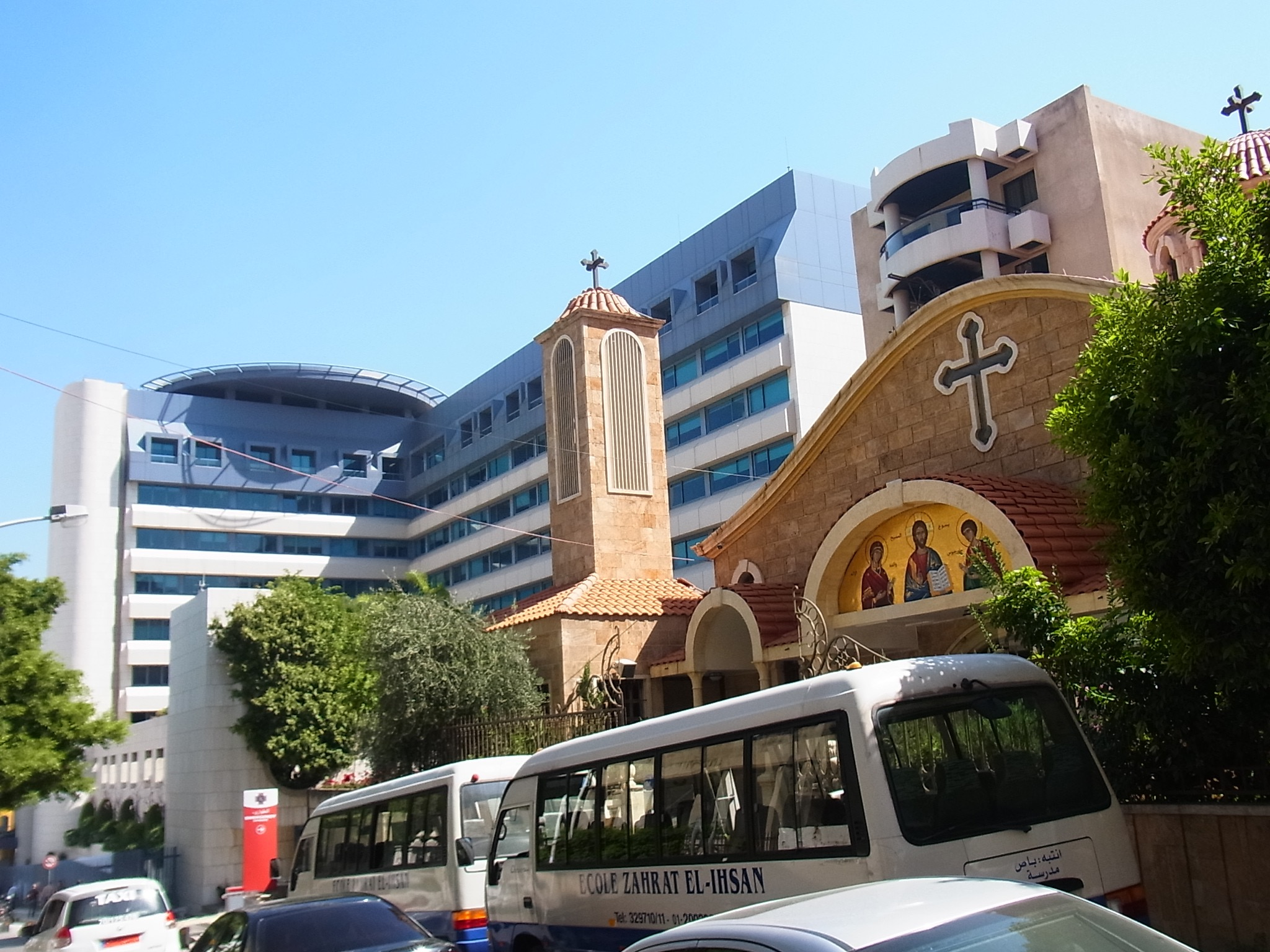
St. George Greek Orthodox Church.

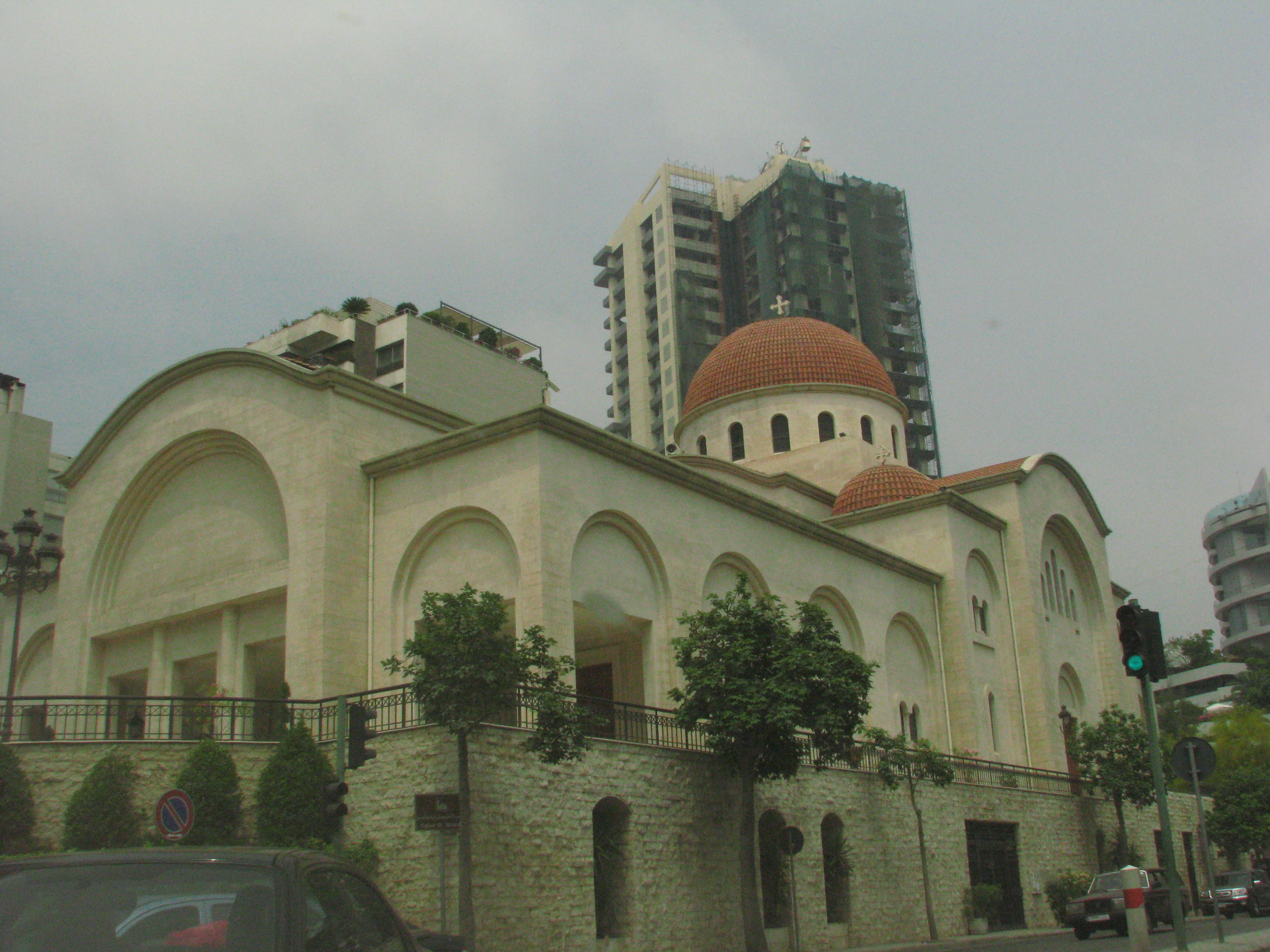
St. Nicholas Greek Orthodox Church.

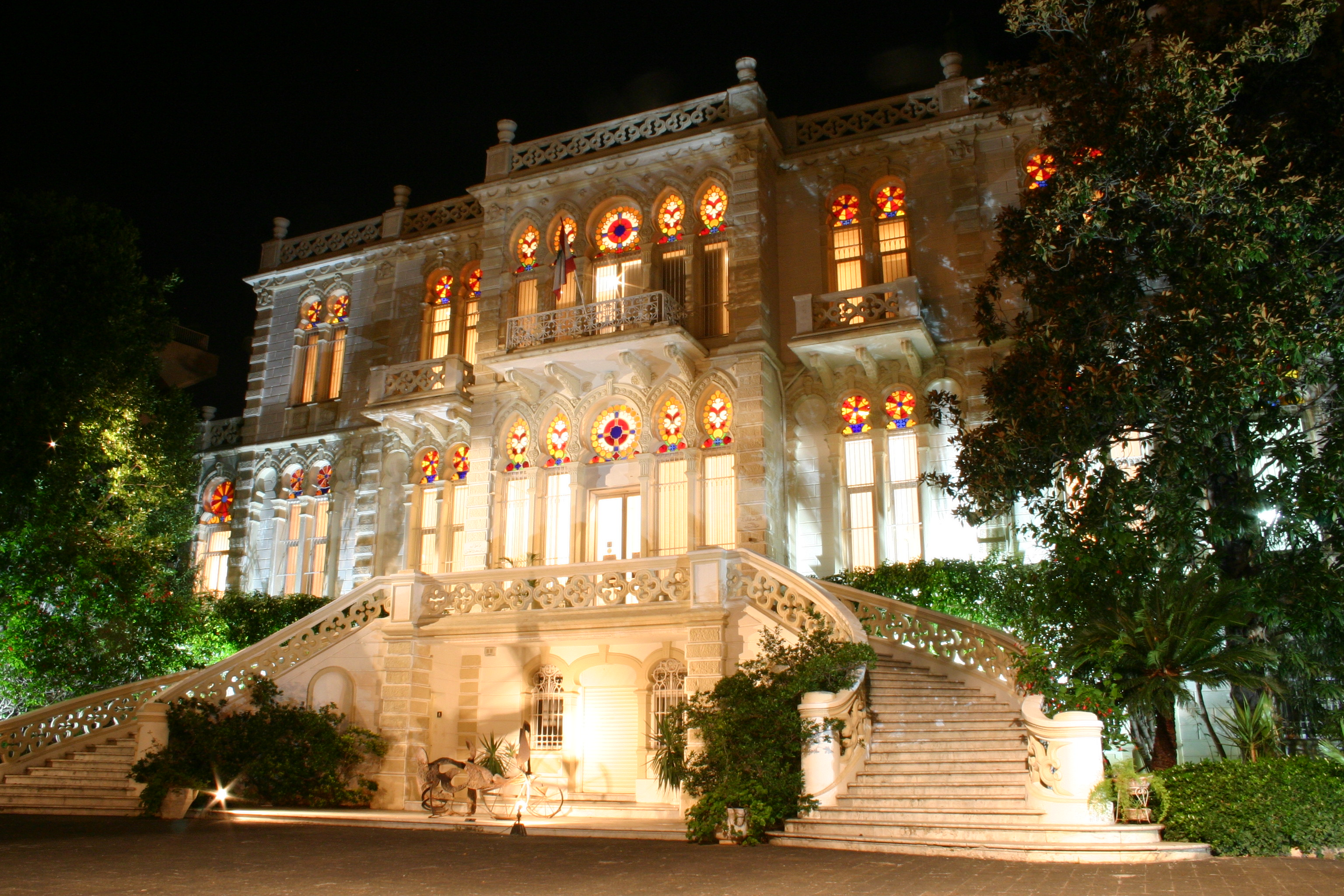
The Sursock Museum.

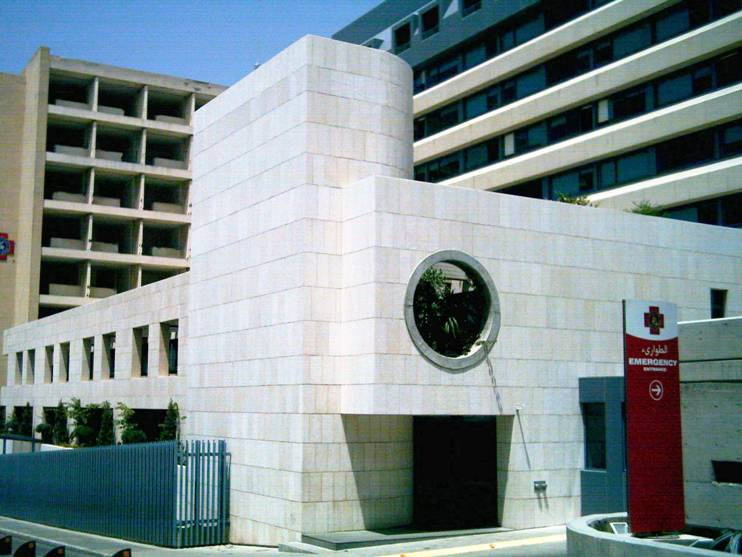
Saint George Hospital University Medical Center

== Demographics ==
Religion in Rmeil (2014)
Religion	Percent
Christian	97.26%
Others	2.74%

In 2014, Christians made up 97.26% and Muslims made up 1.37% of registered voters in Rmeil. 24.57% of the voters were Armenian Orthodox, 23.91% were Maronite Catholics, 19.65% were Greek Orthodox, 10.80% were Greek Catholics, and 5.81% were Latin Catholics.
