= Christmas bonfires =

Christmas tradition in Louisiana, United States

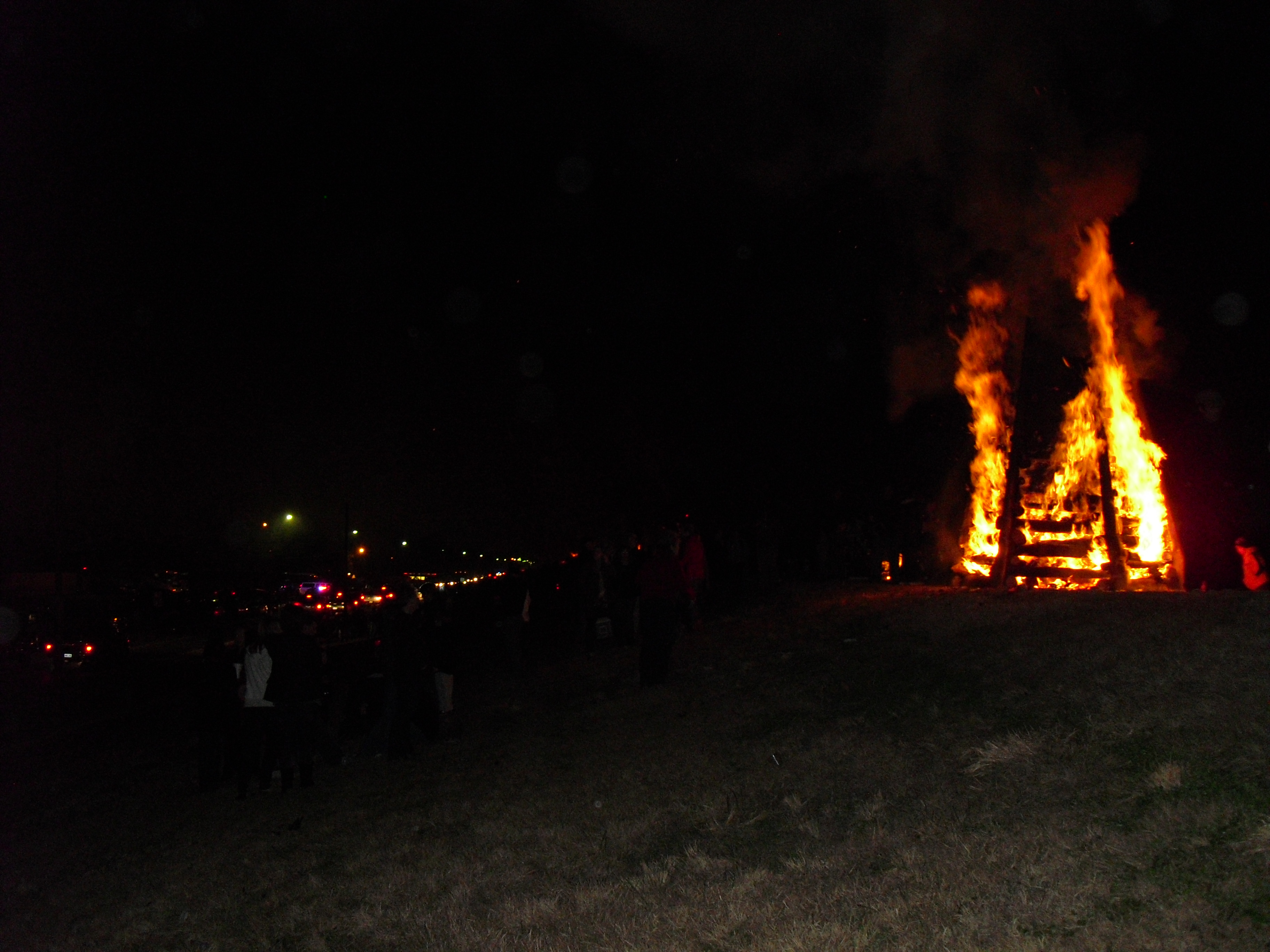
Christmas Eve bonfires along the Mississippi River in Lutcher, Louisiana (2010)

Every year along the Mississippi River levee near the town of Lutcher, Louisiana, over a hundred bonfires are built out of wood, firecrackers, and occasionally bamboo, said to have begun in the late 19th century. This tradition has often occurred on Christmas Eve. In case of rain, it is often rescheduled to New Year's Eve.

== Celebration of Papa Noel ==
The story around the tradition says that the bonfires were made to light a path for Papa Noel. Others have explained the bonfire tradition as being for the purpose of helping friends of the family find the inlets or slips coming off the river to the homes of those they wanted to visit on Christmas Eve.

== Cancelled due to the COVID-19 pandemic ==
In 2020, the Christmas bonfires were cancelled due to the COVID-19 pandemic.
