= Boston Bay =

Boston Bay may refer to:

- Boston Bay, Illinois
- Port of Boston, Massachusetts
- Boston Harbor, Massachusetts
- Boston Bay (South Australia), part of Spencer Gulf
- Boston Bay, Portland Parish, Jamaica

See also

- The Boston Bay State Banner
- Boston Bay College, fictional university in the TV series Dawson's Creek
- "Sailing Down Boston Bay" by Edward Rowe Snow, Yankee Publishing Company, 1941
