= Liverpool Santa Dash =

Annual charity run in Liverpool

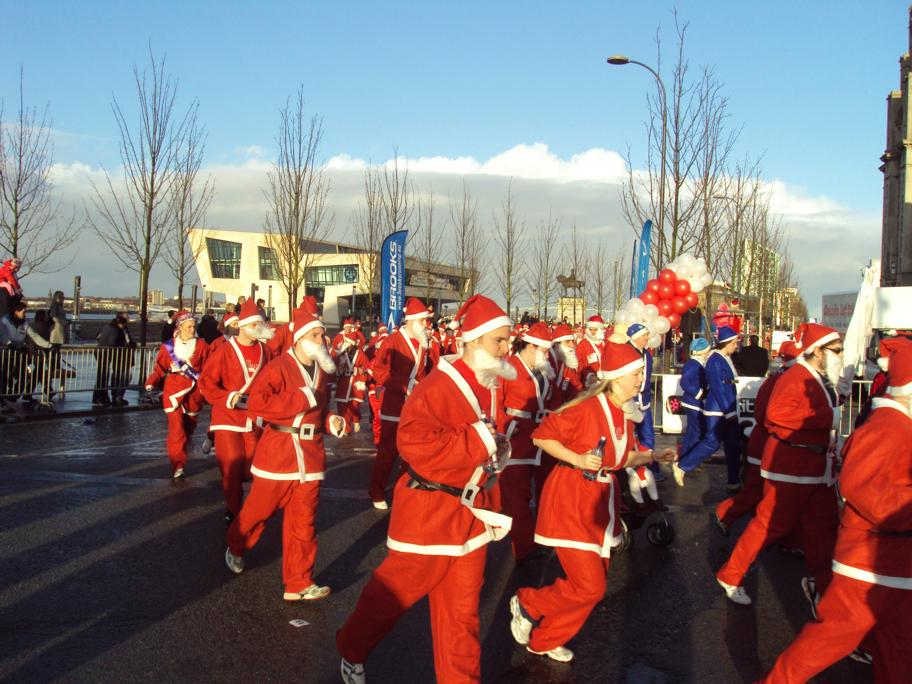
Liverpool Santa Dash 2009

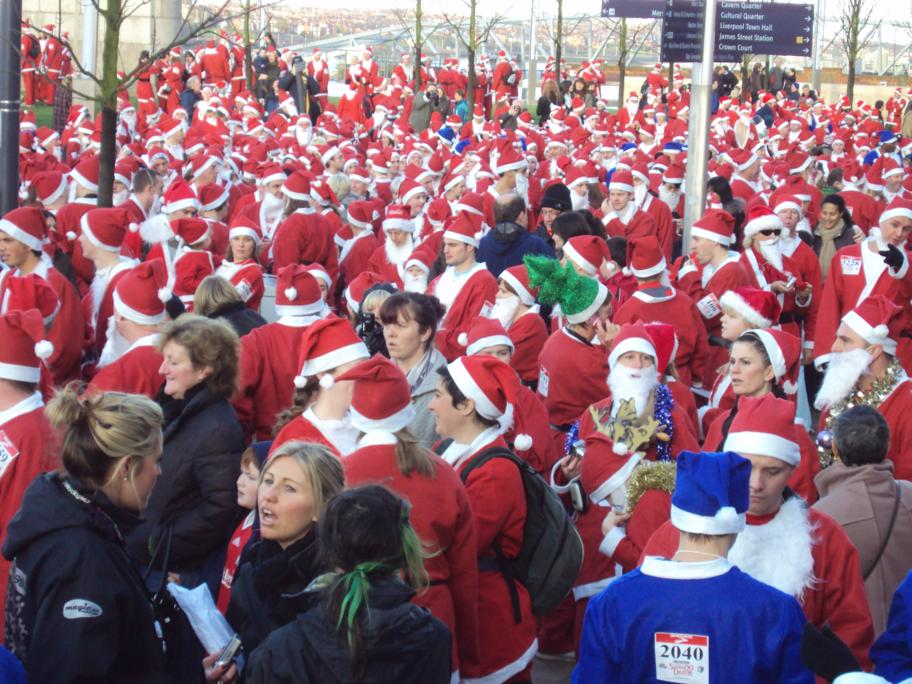
Liverpool Santa Dash 2009

The Liverpool Santa Dash is an annual 5 kilometer fun run held in the first week of December and takes place around Liverpool City Centre. Participants dress up as Santa Claus and along with Las Vegas, Nevada it regularly attempts to break the Guinness World Record for the largest Santa Claus fun run.

As of December 2016 it is the holder of this record.

== The course ==
Generally the course starts at the city's waterfront next to the Three Graces. From there it goes through the city centre, up towards the Churchill Way flyover before finishing outside the town hall.
