= Pancho Claus =

Mexican version of Santa Claus in Texas, US

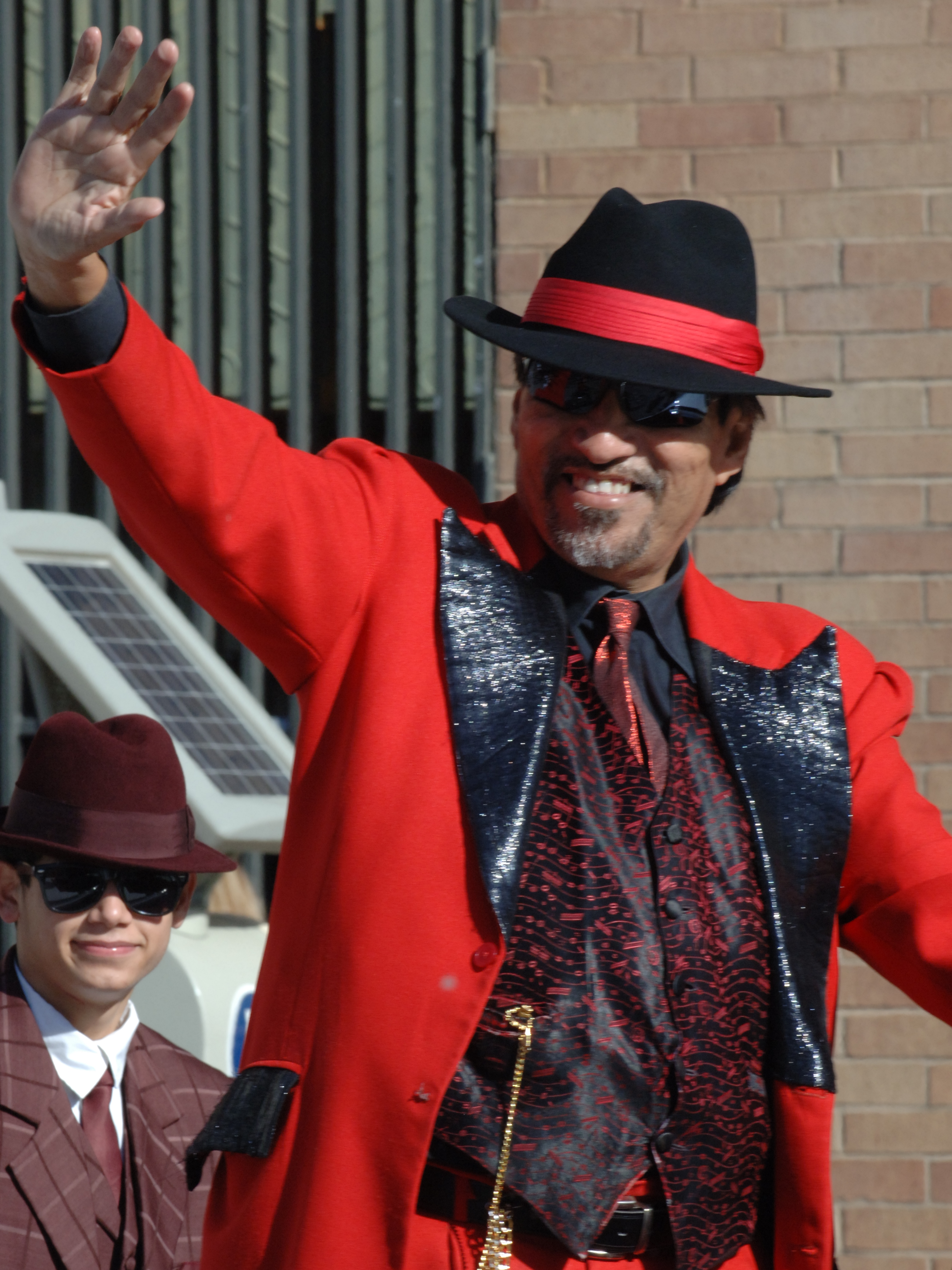
Richard Reyes, Houston's Pancho Claus, seen at his Christmas 2009 parade

Pancho Claus is a Mexican version of Santa Claus popular in parts of the United States, particularly Texas. Pancho Claus is sometimes referred to as a "Tex-Mex" version of Santa. Growing out of the Hispanic civil rights movement of the 1970s, the Pancho Claus tradition incorporates a strong element of charity, with gift-giving and events run for the benefit of disadvantaged children.

== History and tradition ==
Academic Lorenzo Cano, a Mexican-American studies scholar at the University of Houston, believes that Pancho Claus was originally conceived "north of the border" (i.e., in the United States) and arose from a desire of Mexican Americans to "build a place and a space for themselves" in the 1970s. It coincided with the growing interest in other events celebrating Hispanic culture, such as Cinco de Mayo and Mexican Independence Day.

According to the tradition, Pancho Claus hails from the South Pole rather than the North Pole, and is sometimes described as Santa's southern "cousin". Pancho Claus differs from Santa Claus principally by attire, wearing outfits commonly associated with Hispanic culture such as a sombrero and poncho or serape, and often favoring a black or salt-and-pepper beard rather than the white beard of Santa. Instead of reindeer pulling his sled, Pancho is sometimes depicted with a cart and a draft team of burros. In West Texas, Pancho Claus is sometimes referred to as Pancho Clos to further distinguish him from his North Pole counterpart.

=== Practice and well-known Pancho role actors ===
The Pancho Claus figure is strongly associated with notions of charity for disadvantaged children. In Lubbock, Texas, where the tradition has been maintained since 1971, Pancho visits schools, churches and supermarkets, the main event being a large party held annually at Roger's Park the Sunday before Christmas, where food and gifts are distributed free to children. Lubbock's resident Pancho is 71-year-old Julian Perez, who has played the role locally for over 30 years. In San Antonio, the role is acted by Rudy Martinez, who visits schools and churches and distributes gifts and "turkeys with all the trimmings" to 50 disadvantaged families.

One of the best-known Panchos is Richard Reyes, who has maintained the tradition in Houston, Texas, since 1981. Reyes, who wears an atypical outfit for the role consisting of a red zoot suit and fedora, has raised as much as $40,000 annually from corporate sponsors in support of his activities. Reyes and his "army" of volunteers hold a Christmas Eve party for some of the most disadvantaged children of the city, giving them each a free meal and seven presents. On Christmas morning, Reyes and his team take part in a procession of vehicles featuring lowriders, from one of which Reyes distributes gifts to children. An estimated 10,000 gifts are distributed by Reyes and his team each Christmas. Throughout the rest of the year he runs programs to assist teenagers in detention, helping them return to school, or find jobs or even a home. In 2018, Reyes was hospitalized with a health condition, but reported that he had recovered well and, after reducing his schedule, expected to participate in the usual festivities.
