= Flying Santa =

American Christmas tradition

The Flying Santa is the name given to a tradition that dates to Christmas of 1929, when packages of gifts were dropped from a plane to lighthouse keepers and their families along the New England coast.

The organization was the brainchild of William H. Wincapaw, a floatplane pilot from Friendship, Maine. He was well known for transporting passengers and cargo along the Maine coast. He frequently took to the air in less than ideal conditions to provide transport for sick or injured islanders. His actions were responsible for the saving of many lives. On many of these flights, his only means of navigation were the lighthouse beacons maintained by keepers along the coast. He had a great deal of admiration for these men and their families and felt that something special should be done to show them how much their efforts were appreciated. On December 25, 1929, he loaded up his plane with a dozen packages containing newspapers, magazines, coffee, candy and other items - small luxuries that could make living on an isolated island a little more bearable. He flew to lights around the Rockland area and dropped these modest gifts for the lighthouse families. So well received were his Christmas gifts, he expanded the program to cover more light stations and Coast Guard stations throughout New England. Wincapaw did not initially consider himself a Santa Claus; the title was bestowed upon him by residents of the stations that he visited. Soon he was joined on the route by his son, Bill Jr., and by author Edward Rowe Snow. Snow participated in the program for over forty years before his retirement.

The Flying Santa flights have continued uninterrupted, apart from one year during World War II, since 1929; helicopters are now used instead of planes. Retired USCG Chief Warrant Officer Thomas Guthlein and retired Senior Chief David Considine are two of the people who suit up for the Flying Santa role today. The nonprofit Friends of Flying Santa was established in 1997 to continue the flights primarily as a way of expressing gratitude for the work performed by the Coast Guard.

== See also ==
- Christmas events and celebrations (category)
- Christmas traditions (category)
- United States Lighthouse Service
- United States Lighthouse Board
- Lighthouses in the United States
