= Noel Baba =

Turkish new year celebration

Noel Baba (Father Noel) is the Turkish version of Père Noël, which is a widely celebrated figure for New Year celebrations, substituting Christmas Holiday in predominantly Christian countries.

Noel Baba is the bearer of gifts to children and adults alike for the New Year. Just like the Christian Christmas Holiday celebrated in predominantly Christian countries, in Turkey he is expected to leave his gifts under a pine tree called New Year Tree for the New Year eve. For this purpose, he does not represent a religious persona but merely a secular imaginary figure.

== See also ==
- Ded Moroz
