= Santa Claus =

Legendary Christmas figure

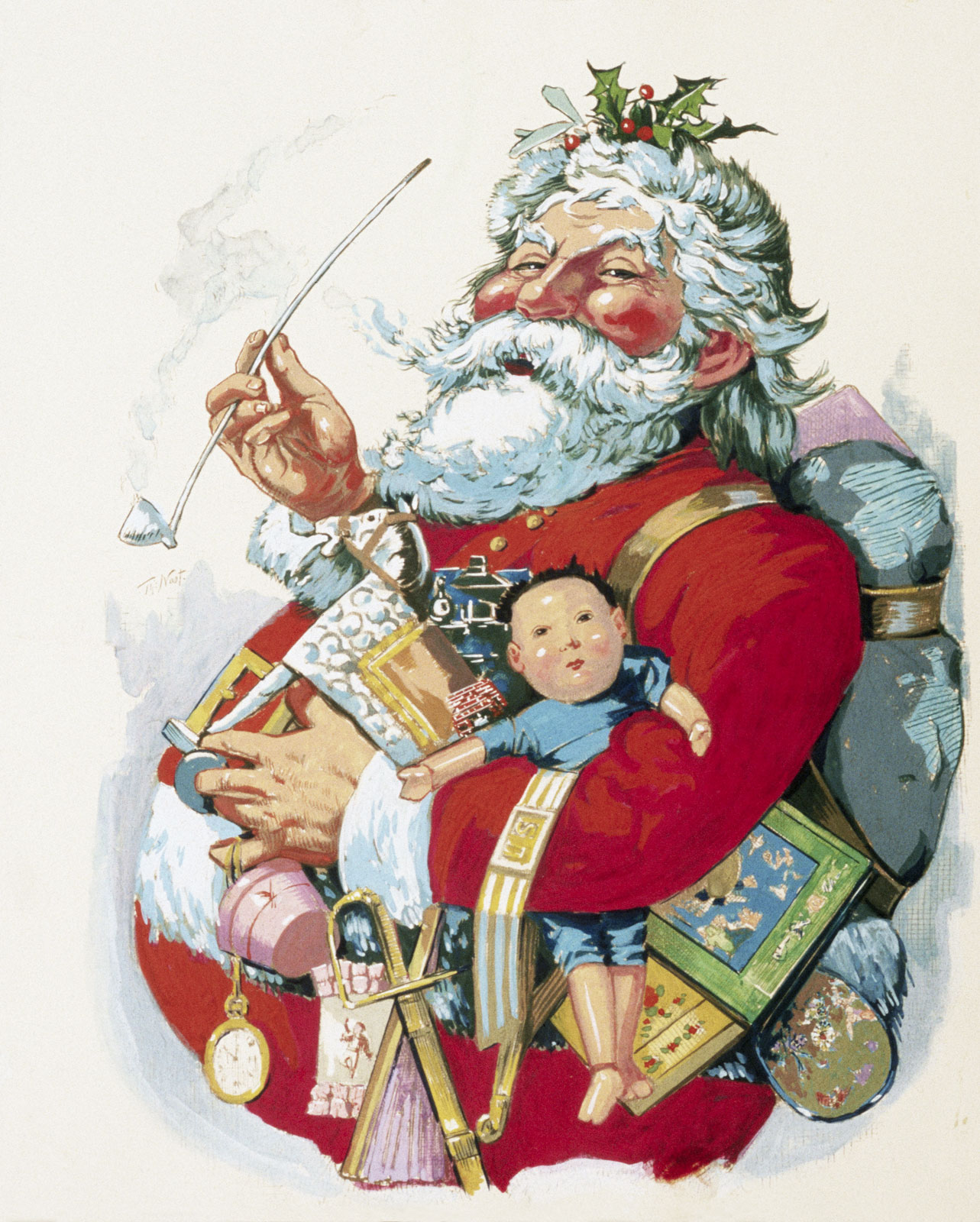
- 1881 illustration by Thomas Nast
- Associates: Elves; reindeer
- Attire: Santa suit
- Aliases: Saint Nicholas; Saint Nick; Father Christmas; Kris Kringle; Mr. Claus; The Man with the Bag; Santa
- Gender: Male
- Occupation: Delivering gifts to children on Christmas
- Spouse: Mrs. Claus
- Home: North Pole; Santa's workshop; Lapland; Santa Claus Village

Santa Claus is a legendary figure originating in Western Christian culture who is said to bring gifts during the late evening and overnight hours on Christmas Eve. Christmas elves are said to make the gifts in Santa's workshop, while flying reindeer pull his sleigh through the air.

The popular conception of Santa Claus originates from folklore traditions surrounding the 4th-century Christian Greek bishop Saint Nicholas, the patron saint of children. Saint Nicholas became renowned for his reported generosity and secret gift-giving. The image of Santa Claus shares similarities with the English figure of Father Christmas, and they are both now popularly regarded as the same person.

Santa is generally depicted as a portly, jolly, white-bearded man, often with glasses, wearing a red coat with white fur collar and cuffs, white-fur-cuffed red trousers, a red hat with white fur trim, a black leather belt and boots, carrying a bag full of gifts for children. He is popularly associated with a deep, hearty laugh, frequently rendered in Christmas literature as "ho, ho, ho!"

This image originated in the United States during the 19th century, after Dutch settlers brought the legend of Sinterklaas ("Saint Nicholas") to 17th-century New Amsterdam (present-day New York City). The 1823 American poem "A Visit from St. Nicholas", written by an anonymous author, recounts Saint Nicholas arriving at the author's home on Christmas Eve in a sleigh pulled by flying reindeer. The poem laid the foundation for modern depictions of Santa Claus, strengthening the association between Santa Claus and Christmas. Over time, this connection has been maintained and reinforced through song, radio, television, children's books, family Christmas traditions, films, and advertising.

== Predecessor figures ==
=== Saint Nicholas ===
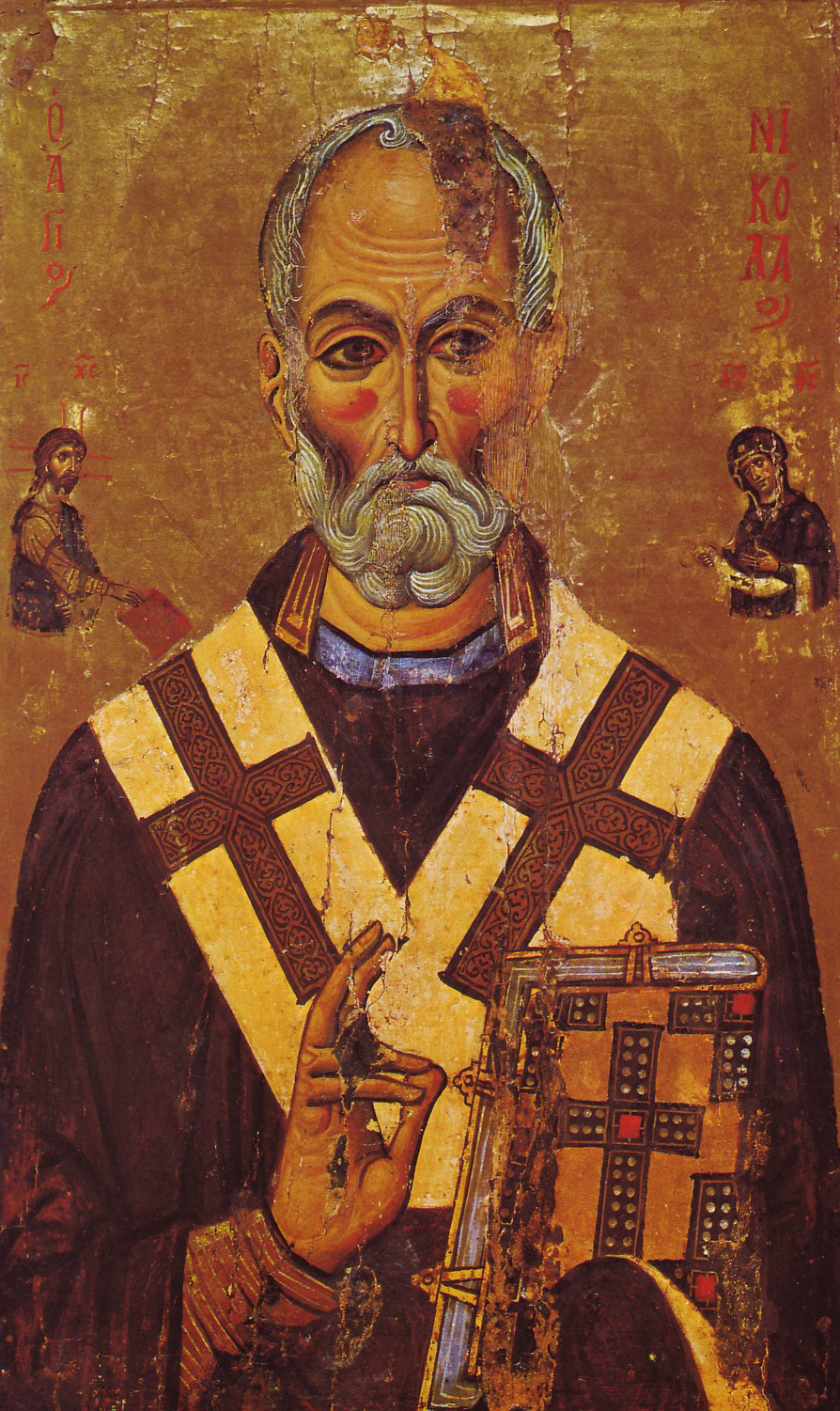
A 13th-century depiction of Saint Nicholas from Saint Catherine's Monastery, Sinai

Saint Nicholas was a 4th-century Greek Christian bishop of Myra (now Demre) in the region of Lycia in the Roman Empire, today in Turkey. Nicholas was known for his generous gifts to the poor, in particular presenting the three impoverished daughters of a pious Christian with dowries so that they would not have to become prostitutes. He was very religious from an early age and devoted his life entirely to Christianity. In continental Europe (more precisely the Netherlands, Belgium, Austria, the Czech Republic and Germany), he is usually portrayed as a bearded bishop in canonical robes.

In 1087, while the Greek Christian inhabitants of Myra were subjugated by the newly arrived Muslim Seljuq dynasty, and soon after their Greek Orthodox church had been declared to be in schism by the Catholic Church (AD 1054), a group of merchants from the Italian city of Bari removed the major bones of Nicholas's skeleton from his sarcophagus in the Greek church in Myra. Over the objection of the monks of Myra the sailors took the bones of Saint Nicholas to Bari, where they are now enshrined in the Basilica di San Nicola. Sailors from Bari collected just half of Nicholas's skeleton, leaving all the minor fragments in the church sarcophagus. These were later taken by Venetian sailors during the First Crusade and placed in Venice, where a church dedicated to Saint Nicholas, the patron of sailors, was built on the San Nicolò al Lido. Saint Nicholas's vandalised sarcophagus can still be seen in the St. Nicholas Church in Myra. This tradition was confirmed in two important scientific investigations of the relics in Bari and Venice, which revealed that the relics in the two Italian cities belong to the same skeleton. Saint Nicholas was later claimed as a patron saint of many diverse groups, from archers, sailors, and children to pawnbrokers. He is also the patron saint of both Amsterdam and Moscow.

During the Middle Ages, often on the evening before his name day of 6 December, children were bestowed gifts in his honour. This date was earlier than the original day of gifts for the children, which moved in the course of the Reformation and its opposition to the veneration of saints in many countries on 24 and 25 December. The custom of gifting to children at Christmas was propagated by Martin Luther as an alternative to the previous very popular gift custom attention on Saint Nicholas, to focus the interest of the children to Christ instead of the veneration of saints. Luther first suggested the Christkind as the bringer of gifts. But Nicholas remained popular as gifts bearer for the people.

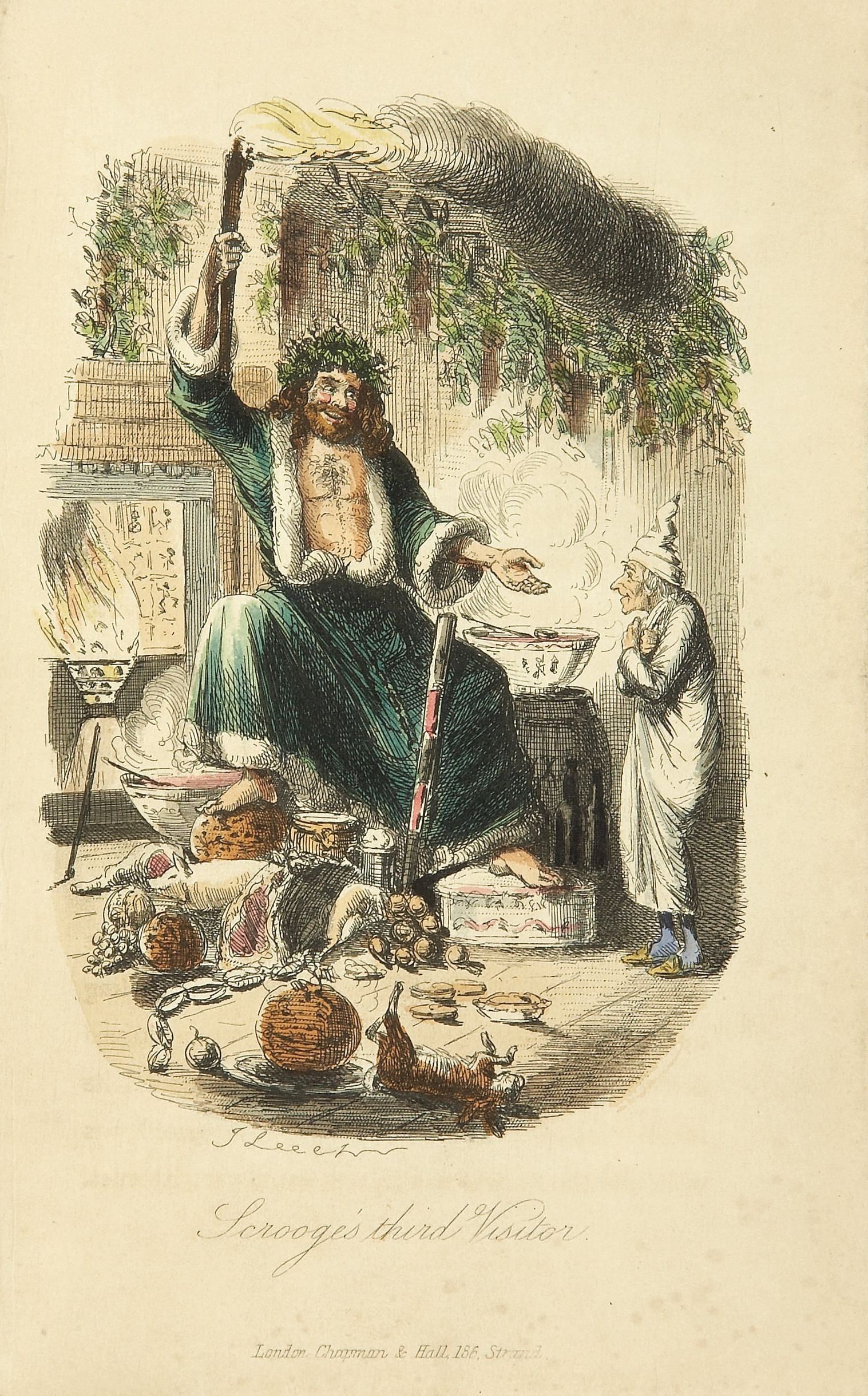
The Ghost of Christmas Present as illustrated by John Leech for Charles Dickens's A Christmas Carol (1843)

=== Father Christmas ===
Father Christmas dates to 16th-century England during the reign of Henry VIII, when he was pictured as a large man in green or scarlet robes lined with fur. He typified the spirit of good cheer at Christmas, bringing peace, joy, good food and wine and revelry. As England no longer kept the feast day of Saint Nicholas on 6 December, the Father Christmas celebration was moved to 25 December to coincide with Christmas Day. The Victorian revival of Christmas included Father Christmas as the emblem of good cheer. His physical appearance was variable, with one image being John Leech's illustration of the "Ghost of Christmas Present" in Charles Dickens's novella A Christmas Carol (1843), as a great genial man in a green coat lined with fur who takes Ebenezer Scrooge through the bustling streets of London on the current Christmas morning, sprinkling the essence of Christmas onto the happy populace.

=== Dutch, Belgian and Swiss folklore ===
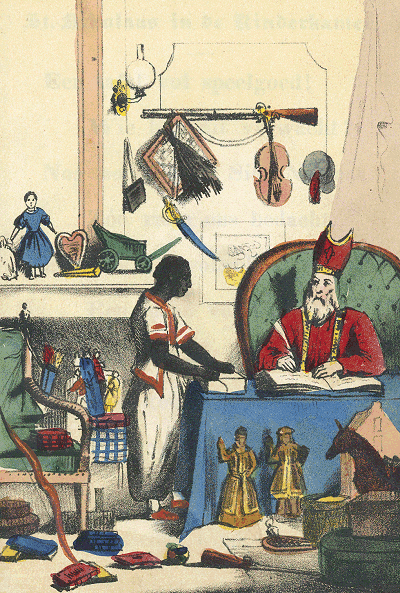
1850 illustration of Saint Nicholas and his servant Père Fouettard/Zwarte Piet

In the Netherlands and Belgium, the character of Santa Claus competes with that of Sinterklaas, based on Saint Nicolas. Santa Claus is known as de Kerstman in Dutch ("the Christmas man") and Père Noël ("Father Christmas") in French. For children in the Netherlands, Sinterklaas remains the predominant gift-giver in December; 36% of the Dutch only give presents on Sinterklaas evening or the day itself, 6 December, while Christmas, 25 December, is used by another 21% to give presents. Some 26% of the Dutch population gives presents on both days. In Belgium, presents are offered exclusively to children on 6 December, and on Christmas Day all ages may receive presents. Saint Nicolas/Sinterklaas' assistants are called "Pieten" (in Dutch) or "Père Fouettard" (in French), and they are not elves.

In Switzerland, Père Fouettard accompanies Père Noël in the French speaking region, while the sinister Schmutzli accompanies Samichlaus in the Swiss German region. Schmutzli carries a twig broom to spank the naughty children.

=== Germanic paganism, Odin, and Christianisation ===
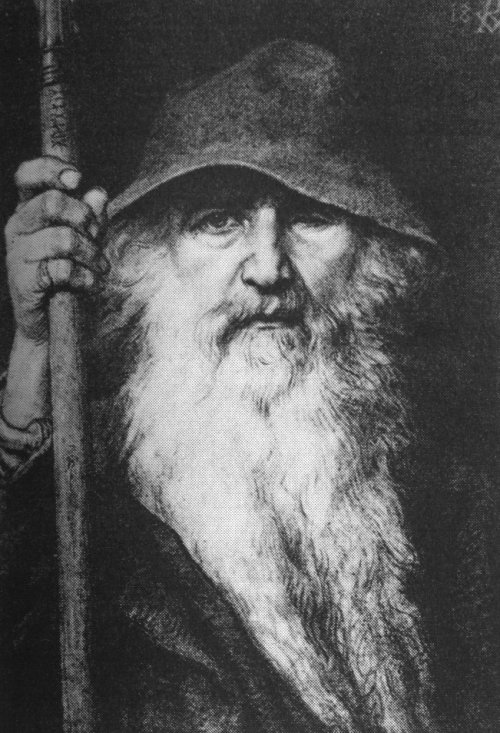
An 1886 depiction of the long-bearded Norse god Odin by Georg von Rosen

Prior to their Christianisation, the Germanic peoples (including the English) celebrated a midwinter event called Yule (Old English geola or giuli). With the Christianisation of Germanic Europe, numerous traditions were absorbed from Yuletide celebrations into modern Christmas, such as the Wild Hunt, frequently attested as being led by the god Odin (Wodan), bearing (among many names) the names Jólnir, meaning "Yule man", and Langbarðr, meaning "long-beard", in Old Norse.

Odin's role during the Yuletide period has been theorised as having influenced concepts of Saint Nicholas and Santa Claus in a variety of facets, including his long white beard and his grey horse for nightly rides (compare Odin's horse Sleipnir) or his reindeer in North American tradition. The folklorist Margaret Baker maintains that "the appearance of Santa Claus or Father Christmas, whose day is the 25th of December, owes much to Odin, the old blue-hooded, cloaked, white-bearded Giftbringer of the north, who rode the midwinter sky on his eight-footed steed Sleipnir, visiting his people with gifts. Odin, transformed into Father Christmas, then Santa Claus, prospered with St Nicholas and the Christchild, became a leading player on the Christmas stage."

In northern Europe, the Yule goat was an earlier bearer of gifts, which has to some degree become conflated with Santa Claus, for instance in the Finnish Joulupukki tradition.

== History ==
=== Origins ===
Early representations of the gift-giver from Church history and folklore, especially Saint Nicholas, merged with the English character Father Christmas to create the mythical character known to the rest of the English-speaking world as "Santa Claus" (a phonetic derivation of "Sinterklaas" in Dutch).

In the English and later British colonies of North America, and later in the United States, British and Dutch versions of the gift-giver merged further. For example, in Washington Irving's History of New York (1809), Sinterklaas was Anglicised into "Santa Claus" (a name first used in the U.S. press in 1773) but lost his bishop's apparel, and was at first pictured as a thick-bellied Dutch sailor with a pipe in a green winter coat. Irving's book was a parody of the Dutch culture of New York, and much of this portrait is his joking invention. Irving's interpretation of Santa Claus was part of a broader movement to tone down the increasingly wild Christmas celebrations of the era, which included aggressive home invasions under the guise of wassailing, substantial premarital sex (leading to shotgun weddings in areas where the Puritans, waning in power and firmly opposed to Christmas, still held some influence) and public displays of sexual deviancy; the celebrations of the era were derided by both upper-class merchants and Christian purists.

Associations of the modern Western Santa's colors and magical attributes with the mushroom Amanita muscaria and shamans of the Sámi, Kamchadals, or Koryaks are unsupported by historical evidence.

=== 19th century ===
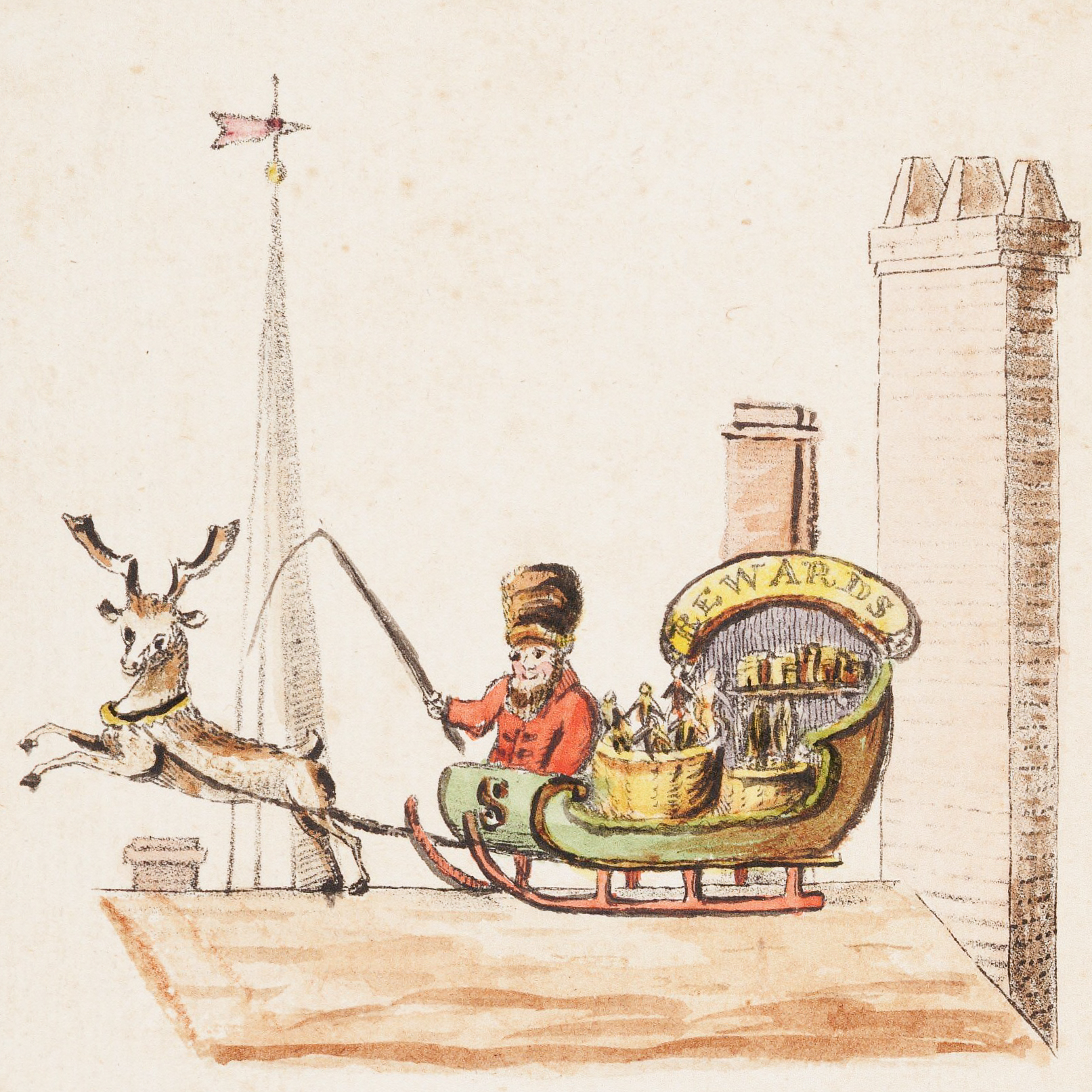
Illustration to verse 1 of "Old Santeclaus with Much Delight"

In 1821 the book A New-year's present, to the little ones from five to twelve was published in New York. It contained "Old Santeclaus with Much Delight", an anonymous poem (possibly written by Clement Clarke Moore) describing Santeclaus on a reindeer sleigh, bringing rewards to children. Some modern ideas of Santa Claus seemingly became canon after the anonymous publication of the poem A Visit From St. Nicholas (better known today as The Night Before Christmas) in the Troy, New York Sentinel on 23 December 1823; Moore later claimed authorship, though others have argued that the author was Henry Livingston Jr., although he had never claimed authorship of the piece and died nine years before Moore revealed himself as the author. Saint Nicholas is described as being "chubby and plump, a right jolly old elf" with "a little round belly", that "shook when he laughed like a bowlful of jelly", in spite of which the "miniature sleigh" and "tiny reindeer" still indicate that he is physically diminutive. The reindeer were also named: Dasher, Dancer, Prancer, Vixen, Comet, Cupid, Dunder and Blixem (Dunder and Blixem came from the old Dutch words for thunder and lightning, which were later changed to the more German sounding Donner and Blitzen).

By 1845 "Kris Kringle" (from "Christkindl", German for "Christ-child") was a common variant of Santa in parts of the United States. A magazine article from 1853, describing American Christmas customs to British readers, refers to children hanging up their stockings on Christmas Eve for "a fabulous personage" whose name varies: in Pennsylvania he is usually called "Krishkinkle", but in New York he is "St. Nicholas" or "Santa Claus". The author quotes Moore's poem in its entirety, saying that its descriptions apply to Krishkinkle too.

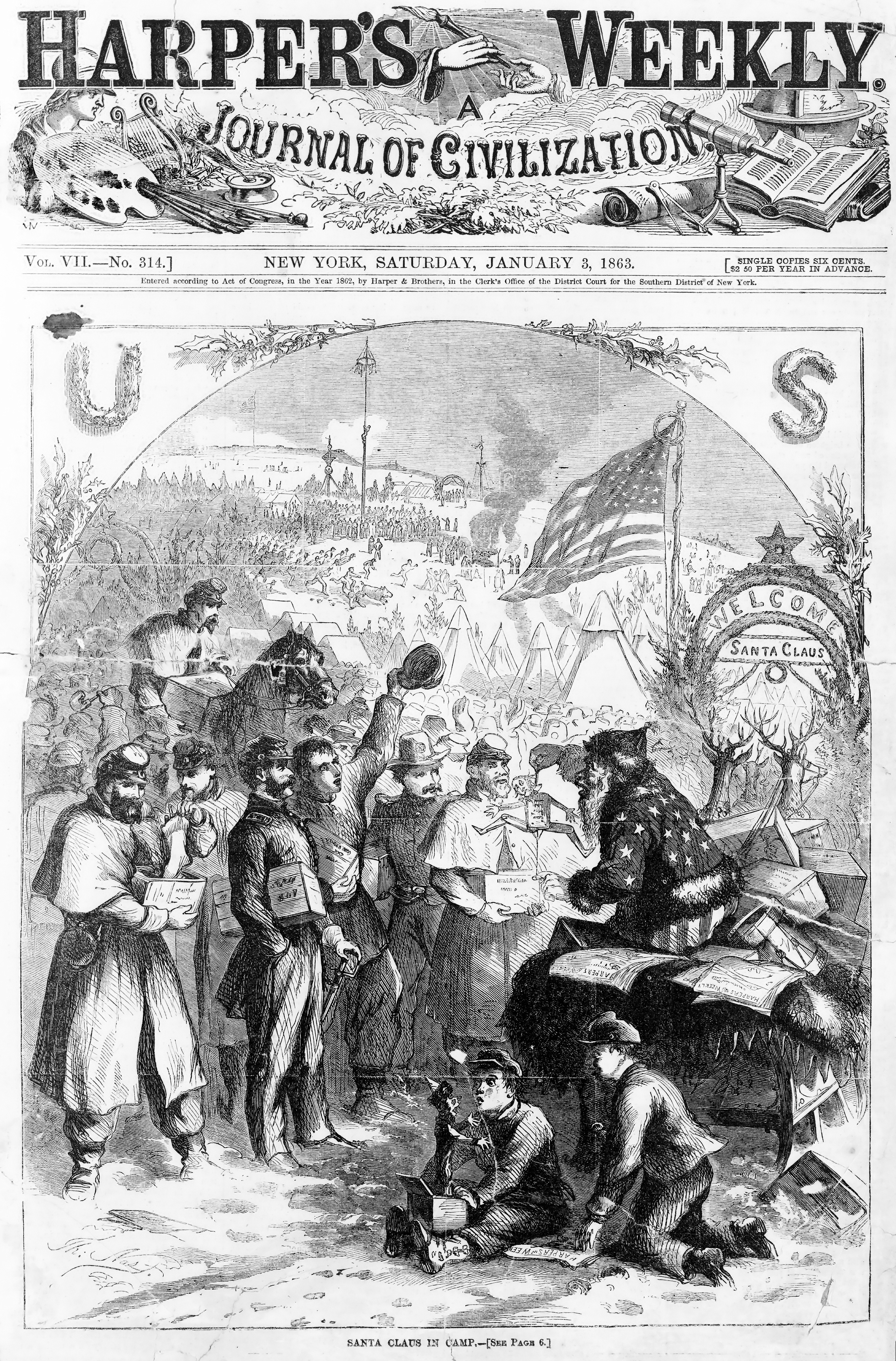
Nast's 1863 depiction of Santa Claus distributing gifts in a Union army camp introduced our modern image of Santa Claus

As the years passed, Santa Claus evolved into a large, heavyset person. One of the first artists to define the modern image of Santa Claus was Thomas Nast, a German-born American cartoonist of the 19th century who immortalised Santa Claus with an illustration for the 3 January 1863 issue of Harper's Weekly in which Santa was dressed in an American flag, and had a puppet with the name "Jeff" written on it, reflecting its American Civil War context. Nast was inspired by the Belsnickel, part of the folklore in southwestern Germany, where he was born. In this drawing, Santa is also in a sleigh pulled by reindeer.

The story that Santa Claus lives at the North Pole may also have been a Nast creation. His Christmas image in the Harper's issue dated 29 December 1866 was a collage of engravings titled Santa Claus and His Works, which included the caption "Santa Claussville, N.P." A colour collection of Nast's pictures, published in 1869, had a poem also titled "Santa Claus and His Works" by George P. Webster, who wrote that Santa Claus's home was "near the North Pole, in the ice and snow". The tale had become well known by the 1870s. A boy from Colorado writing to the children's magazine The Nursery in late 1874 said, "If we did not live so very far from the North Pole, I should ask Santa Claus to bring me a donkey."

The idea of a wife for Santa Claus may have been the creation of American authors, beginning in the mid-19th century. In 1889, the poet Katharine Lee Bates popularised Mrs Claus in the poem "Goody Santa Claus on a Sleigh Ride". "Is There a Santa Claus?" is the title of an iconic editorial by Francis Pharcellus Church in the 21 September 1897 edition of The New York Sun that became the most reprinted in the US and included the famous reply, "Yes, Virginia, there is a Santa Claus".

=== 20th century ===
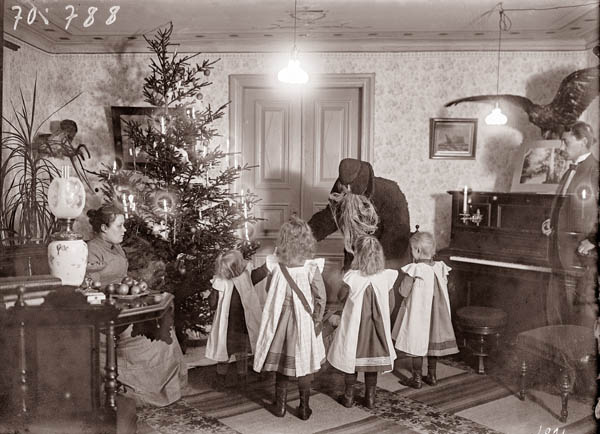
Joulupukki (the Finnish Santa Claus) visits the Lönn family in 1901.

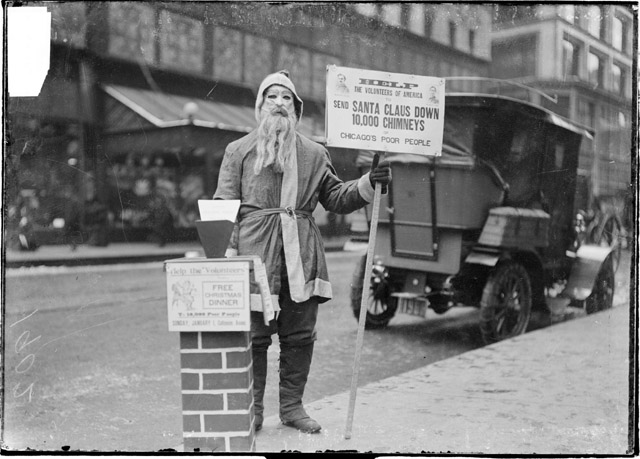
A man dressed as Santa Claus fundraising for Volunteers of America on the sidewalk of street in Chicago, Illinois, in 1902. He is wearing a mask with a beard attached.

L. Frank Baum's The Life and Adventures of Santa Claus, a children's book, was published in 1902. Much of Santa Claus's mythos was not firmly established at the time, leaving Baum to give his "Neclaus" (Necile's Little One) a variety of immortal support, a home in the Laughing Valley of Hohaho, and ten reindeer—who could not fly, but leapt in enormous, flight-like bounds. Claus's immortality was earned, much like his title ("Santa"), decided by a vote of those naturally immortal. This work also established Santa's motives: a happy childhood among immortals. When Ak, Master Woodsman of the World, exposes him to the misery and poverty of children in the outside world, Santa strives to find a way to bring joy into the lives of all children, and eventually invents toys as a principal means. Santa later appears in The Road to Oz as an honored guest at Ozma's birthday party, stated to be famous and beloved enough for everyone to bow even before he is announced as "The most Mighty and Loyal Friend of Children, His Supreme Highness – Santa Claus".

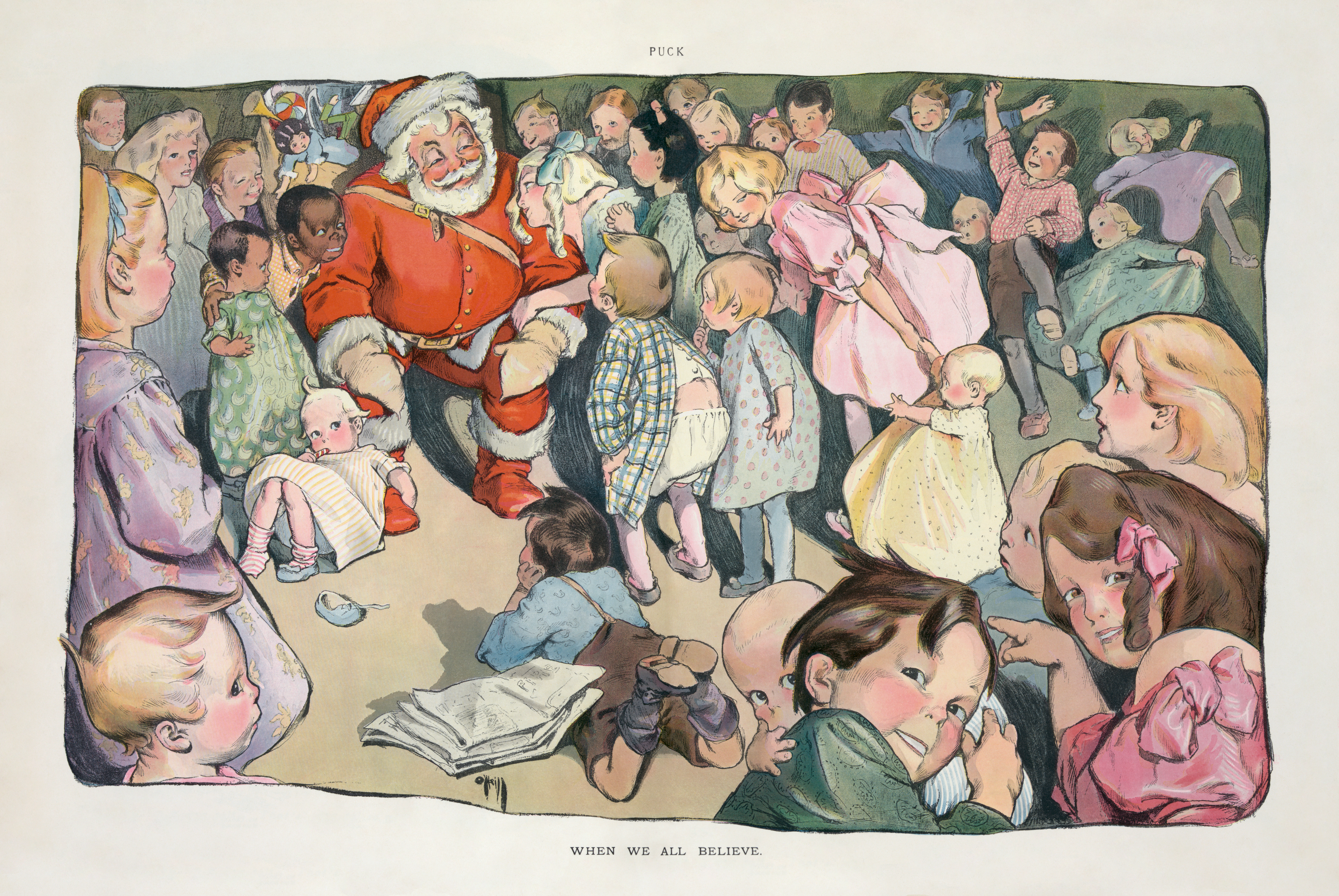
Rose O'Neill's illustration for the 1903 issue of Puck

Images of Santa Claus were conveyed through Haddon Sundblom's depiction of him for The Coca-Cola Company's Christmas advertising in the 1930s. The image made urban legends that Santa Claus was invented by The Coca-Cola Company or that Santa wears red and white because they are the colours used to promote the Coca-Cola brand. Coca-Cola's competitor Pepsi-Cola used similar Santa Claus paintings in its advertisements in the 1940s and 1950s. Historically, Coca-Cola was not the first soft drink company to utilise the modern image of Santa Claus in its advertising—White Rock Beverages had used a Santa figure in monochrome advertisements for mineral water in 1915, and in 1923–25, the same company used colour images of Santa Claus in adverts for drink mixers. Earlier, Santa Claus had appeared dressed in red and white and essentially in his current form on several covers of Puck magazine in the first few years of the 20th century.

The image of Santa Claus as a benevolent character became reinforced with its association with charity and philanthropy, particularly by organisations such as the Salvation Army. Volunteers dressed as Santa Claus typically became part of fundraising drives to aid needy families at Christmas time.

In 1937 Charles W. Howard, who played Santa Claus in department stores and parades, established the Charles W. Howard Santa School, the oldest continuously run such school in the world.

In some images from the early 20th century, Santa was depicted as personally making his toys by hand in a small workshop like a craftsman. Eventually, the idea emerged that he had numerous elves responsible for making the toys, but the toys were still handmade by each individual elf working in the traditional manner.

The 1956 popular song by George Melachrino, "Mrs. Santa Claus", and the 1963 children's book How Mrs. Santa Claus Saved Christmas, by Phyllis McGinley, helped to standardise and establish the character and role of Mrs Claus in the US.

Seabury Quinn's 1948 novel Roads draws from historical legends to tell the story of Santa and the origins of Christmas. Other modern additions to the "story" of Santa include Rudolph the Red-Nosed Reindeer, the 9th and lead reindeer created in 1939 by Robert L. May, a Montgomery Ward copywriter, and immortalised in a 1949 song by Gene Autry.

== In popular culture ==
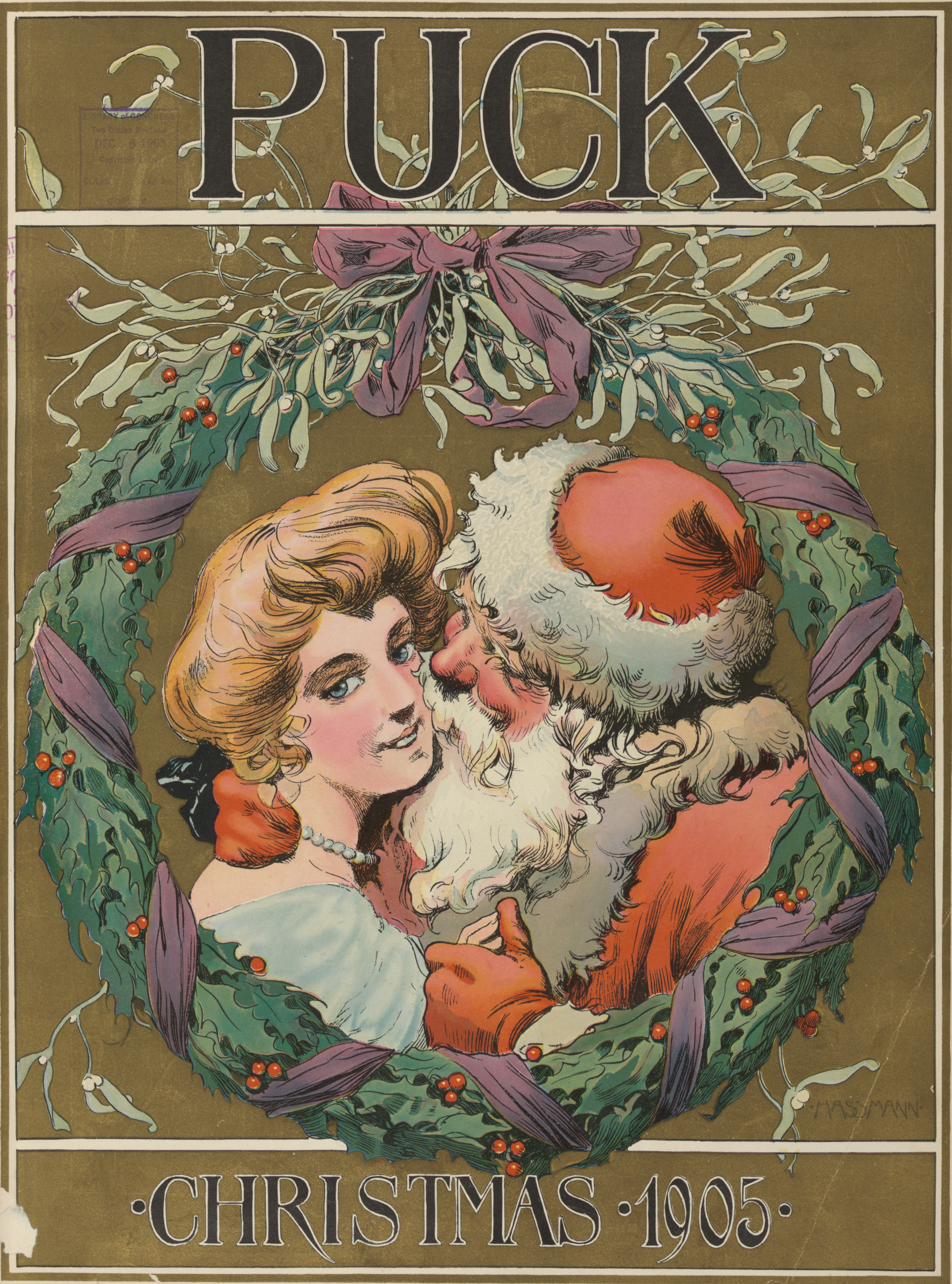
Santa on the December 1905 cover of Puck magazine, v. 58, no. 150

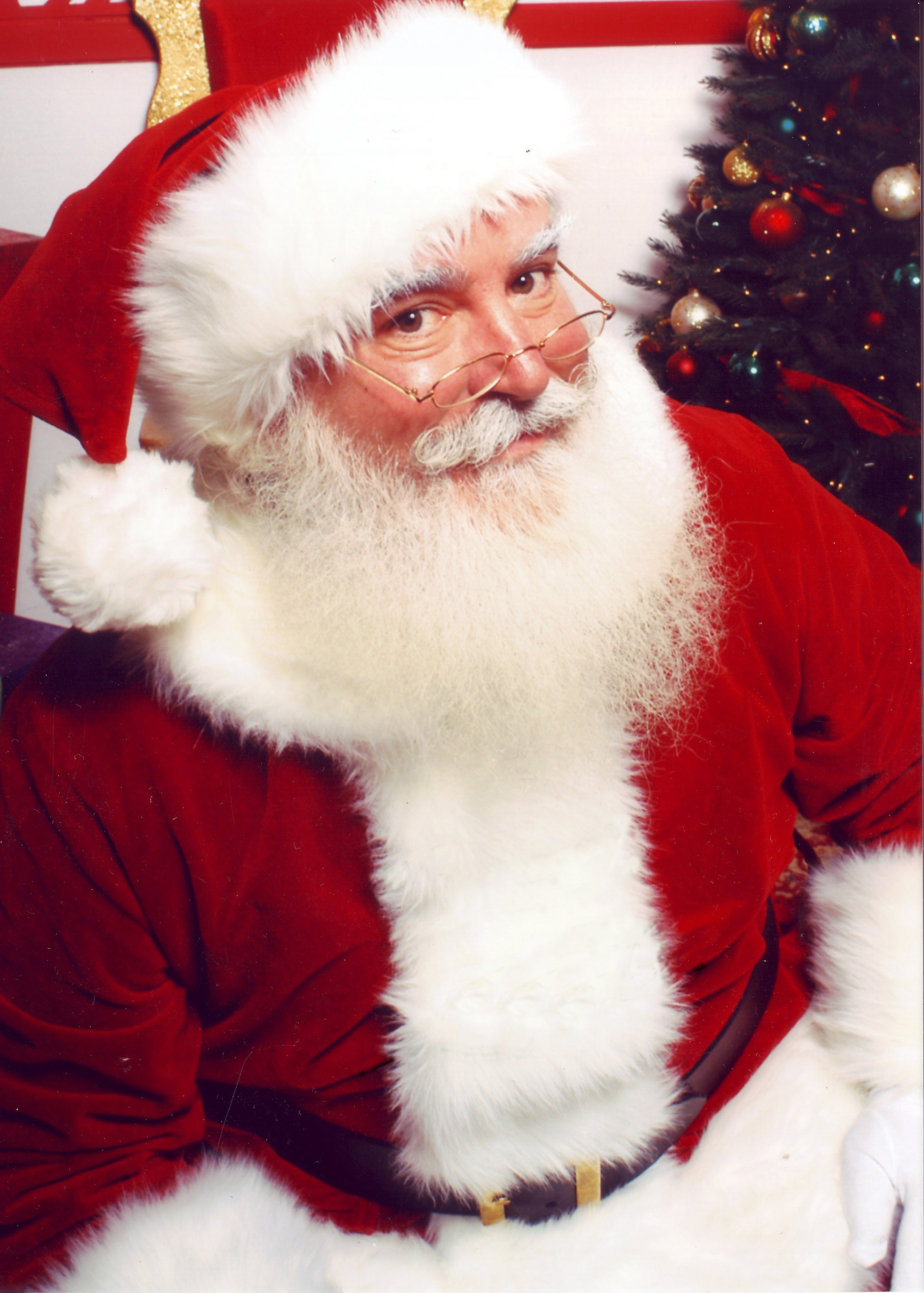
Santa portrayed by Jonathan Meath

Elves had been portrayed as using assembly lines to produce toys early in the 20th century. That shift was reflected in the modern depiction of Santa's residence—now often humorously portrayed as a fully mechanised production and distribution facility, equipped with the latest manufacturing technology, and overseen by the elves with Santa and Mrs Claus as executives or managers.

In 1912 the actor Leedham Bantock became the first actor to be identified as having played Santa Claus in a film, Santa Claus, which he also directed. The film includes scenes photographed in a limited, two-tone colour process and featured the use of detailed models. Since then many feature films have featured Santa Claus as a protagonist, including Miracle on 34th Street, The Santa Clause, and Elf.

In the cartoon base, Santa has been voiced by several people, including Mickey Rooney, Jim Cummings, Mel Smith, Ricky Tomlinson, Jim Belushi, and Alec Baldwin.

Santa has been described as a positive male cultural icon:

Santa is really the only cultural icon we have who's male, does not carry a gun, and is all about peace, joy, giving, and caring for other people. That's part of the magic for me, especially in a culture where we've become so commercialized and hooked into manufactured icons. Santa is much more organic, integral, connected to the past, and therefore connected to the future.

— TV producer Jonathan Meath who portrays Santa, 2011

Norman Corwin's 1938 comic radio play The Plot to Overthrow Christmas, set entirely in rhyme, details a conspiracy of the Devil Mephistopheles and damned figures of history to defeat the good will among men of Christmas, by sending the Roman emperor Nero to the North Pole to assassinate Santa Claus. Through a battle of wits, Santa saves himself by winning Nero over to the joys of Christmas, and gives him a Stradivarius violin. The play was re-produced in 1940 and 1944.

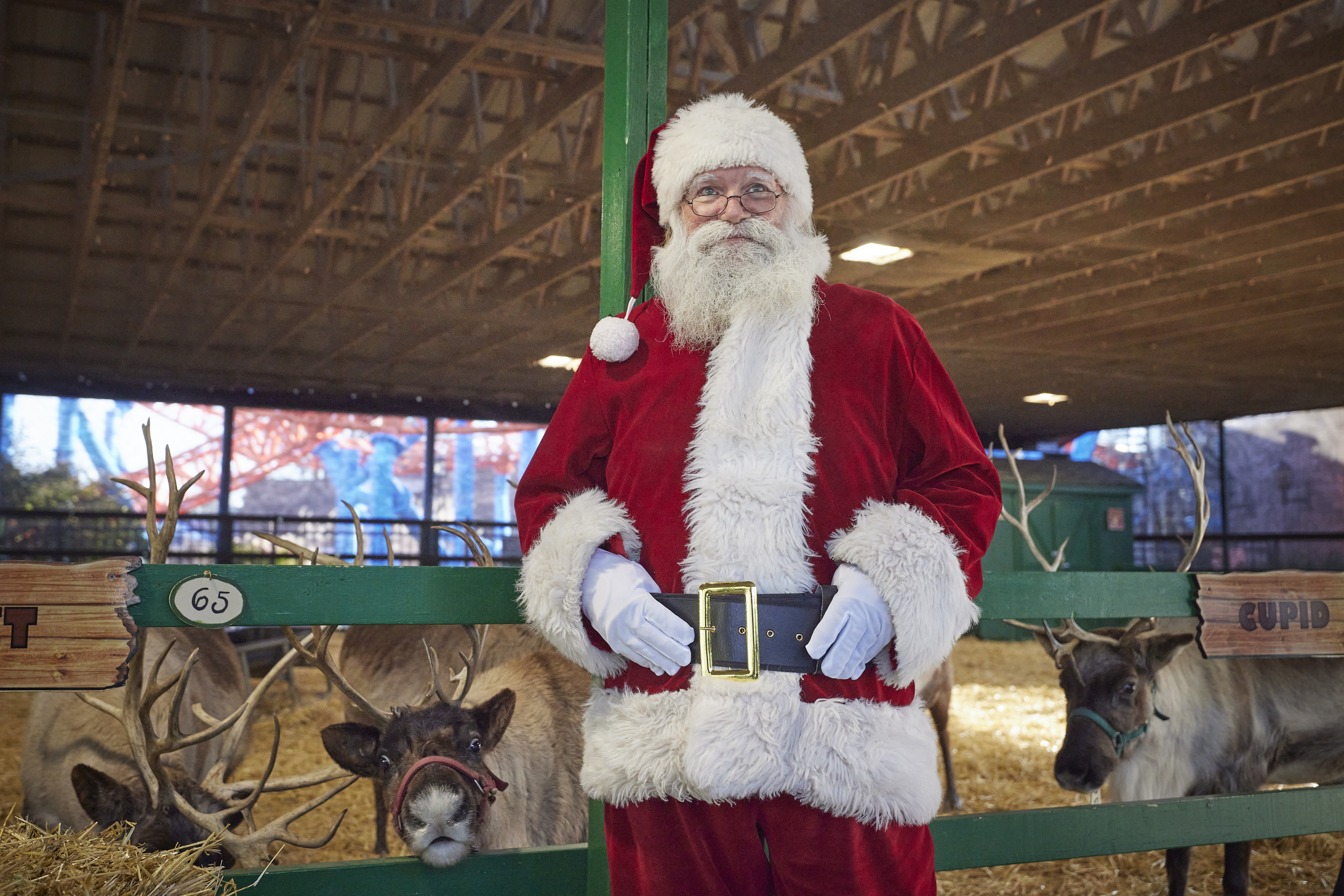
Santa Claus with reindeer at Hersheypark, Hershey, Pennsylvania 2021

Many television commercials, comic strips and other media depict this as a sort of humorous business, with Santa's elves acting as a sometimes mischievously disgruntled workforce, cracking jokes and pulling pranks on their boss. For instance, a Bloom County story from 15 December 1981 through 24 December 1981 has Santa rejecting the demands of PETCO (Professional Elves Toy-Making and Craft Organization) for higher wages, a hot tub in the locker room, and "Aggressive recruitment of a wider gender spectrum of employee" ("short broads"), with the elves then going on strike. Ronald Reagan steps in, fires all of Santa's helpers, and replaces them with out-of-work air traffic controllers (an obvious reference to the 1981 air traffic controllers' strike), resulting in a riot before Santa vindictively rehires them in humiliating new positions such as his reindeer. In the 2001 The Sopranos episode, "To Save Us All from Satan's Power", Paulie Gualtieri says he "Used to think Santa and Mrs. Claus were running a sweatshop over there. The original elves were ugly, traveled with Santa to throw bad kids a beatin', and gave the good ones toys."

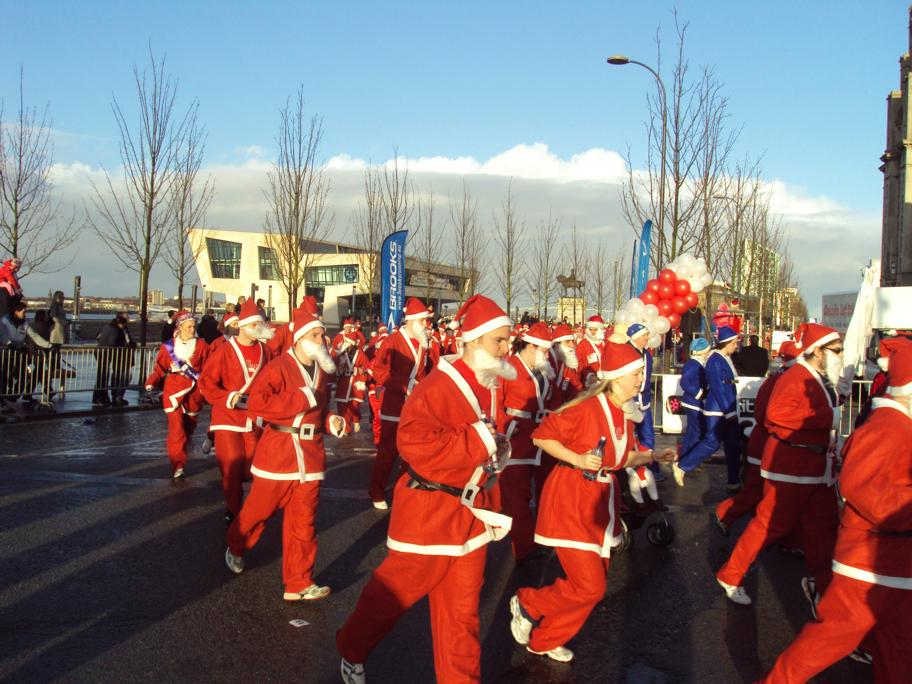
2009 Liverpool Santa Dash

In Kyrgyzstan, a mountain peak was named after Santa Claus, after a Swedish company had suggested the location be a more efficient starting place for present-delivering journeys all over the world, than Lapland. In the Kyrgyz capital, Bishkek, a Santa Claus Festival was held on 30 December 2007, with government officials attending. 2008 was officially declared the Year of Santa Claus in the country. The events are seen as moves to boost tourism in Kyrgyzstan.

The Guinness World Record for the largest gathering of Santa Clauses is held by Thrissur, Kerala, India, where on 27 December 2014, 18,112 Santas overtook the previous record. Derry City, Northern Ireland had held the record since 9 September 2007, when a total of 12,965 people dressed up as Santa or Santa's helpers. A gathering of Santas in 2009 in Bucharest, Romania attempted to top the world record, but failed with only 3,939 Santas.

Santa Claus has been featured in many video games.

In Brazil, a version of Santa with green clothes instead of red became popular through television commercials for the soft drink brand Dolly appearing along with their mascot Dollynho since the 2000s, as a form of patriotism adapting the character to the colours of the Brazilian flag and at the same time rivalling Coca-Cola commercials. Another attempt to adapt Santa Claus to the colours of the Brazilian flag occurred in 2024 in Balneário Camboriú, Santa Catarina, where a sculpture wearing yellow clothes with green gloves and bag was installed, generating controversy, being accused of making an association with the political extreme right, due to the colours being seen in protests by supporters of Jair Bolsonaro.

== Traditions and rituals ==
=== Chimneys ===
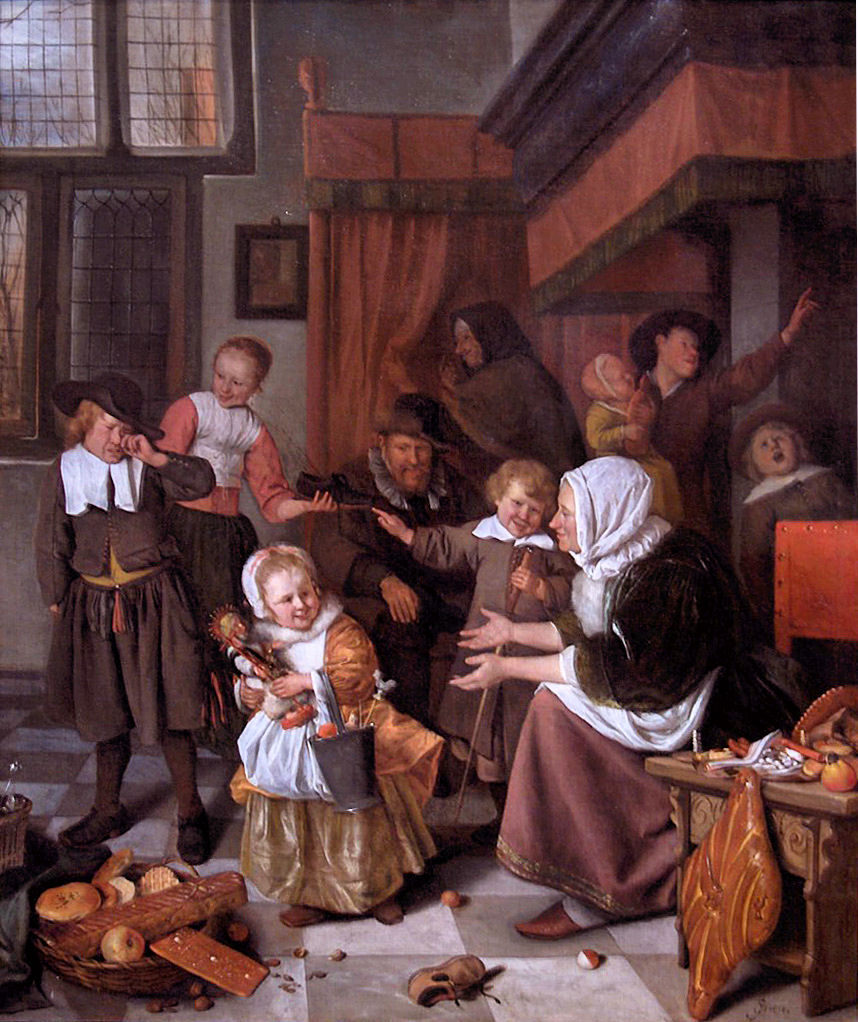
The Feast of Saint Nicholas by Jan Steen (c. 1665–1668)

The tradition of Santa Claus being said to enter dwellings through the chimney is shared by many European seasonal gift-givers.

=== Christmas Eve ===
In Hungary, Saint Nicolaus (Mikulás) or Father Winter (Télapó) comes on the night of 5 December and the children get their gifts the next morning. They get sweets in a bag if they were good, and a golden-coloured birch switch if not. On Christmas Eve "Little Jesus" comes and gives gifts for everyone.

In Slovenia, Saint Nicholas (Miklavž) also brings small gifts for good children on the eve of 6 December. Božiček (Christmas Man) brings gifts on the eve of 25 December, and Dedek Mraz (Grandfather Frost) brings gifts in the evening of 31 December to be opened on New Years Day.

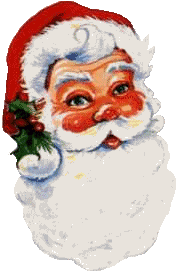
An archetypal North American depiction of Santa Claus

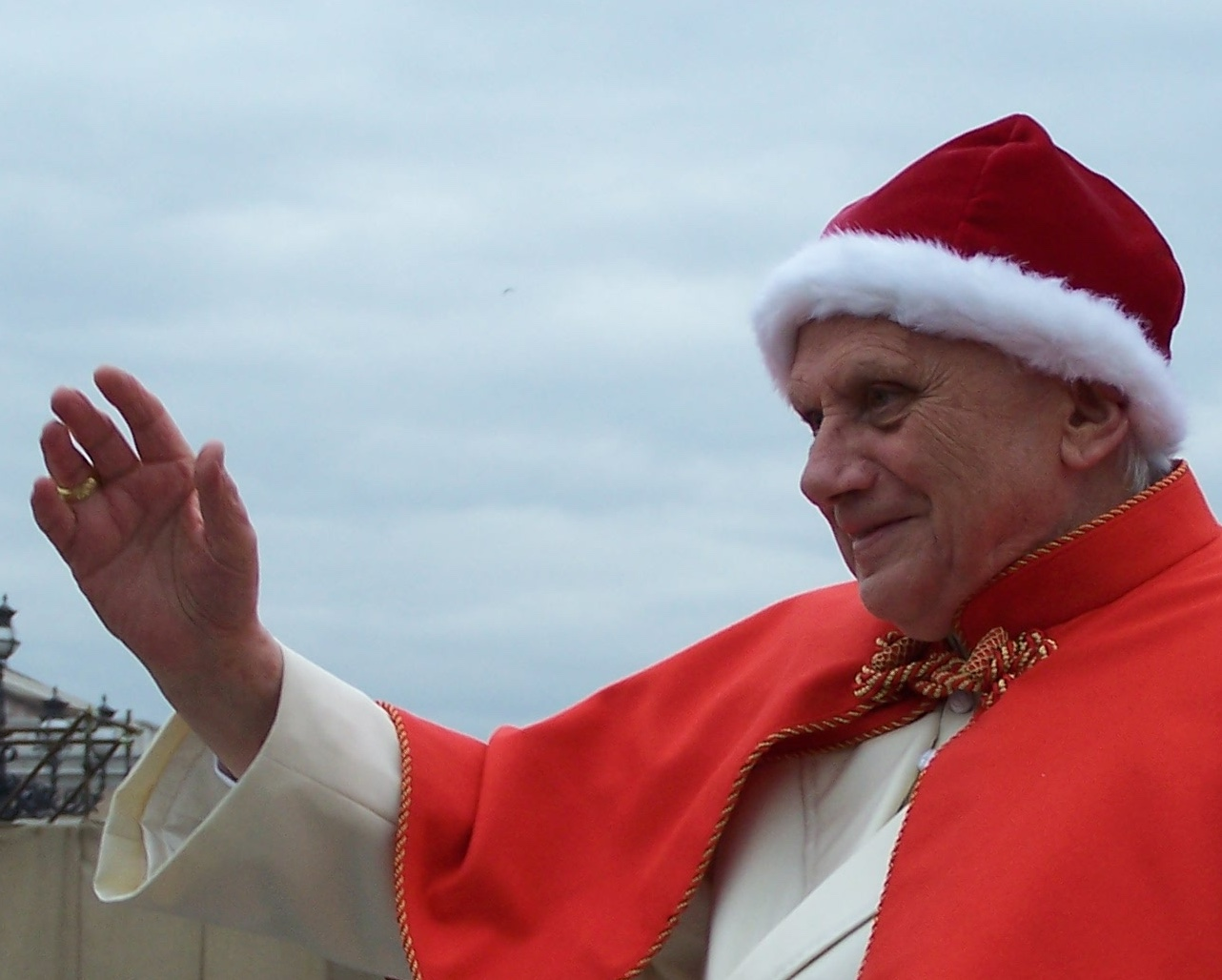
Benedict XVI wearing a camauro, which has been likened to Santa's hat.

After the children have fallen asleep, parents play the role of Santa Claus and leave their gifts under the Christmas tree, which may be signed as being "from Santa Claus".

=== Appearance ===
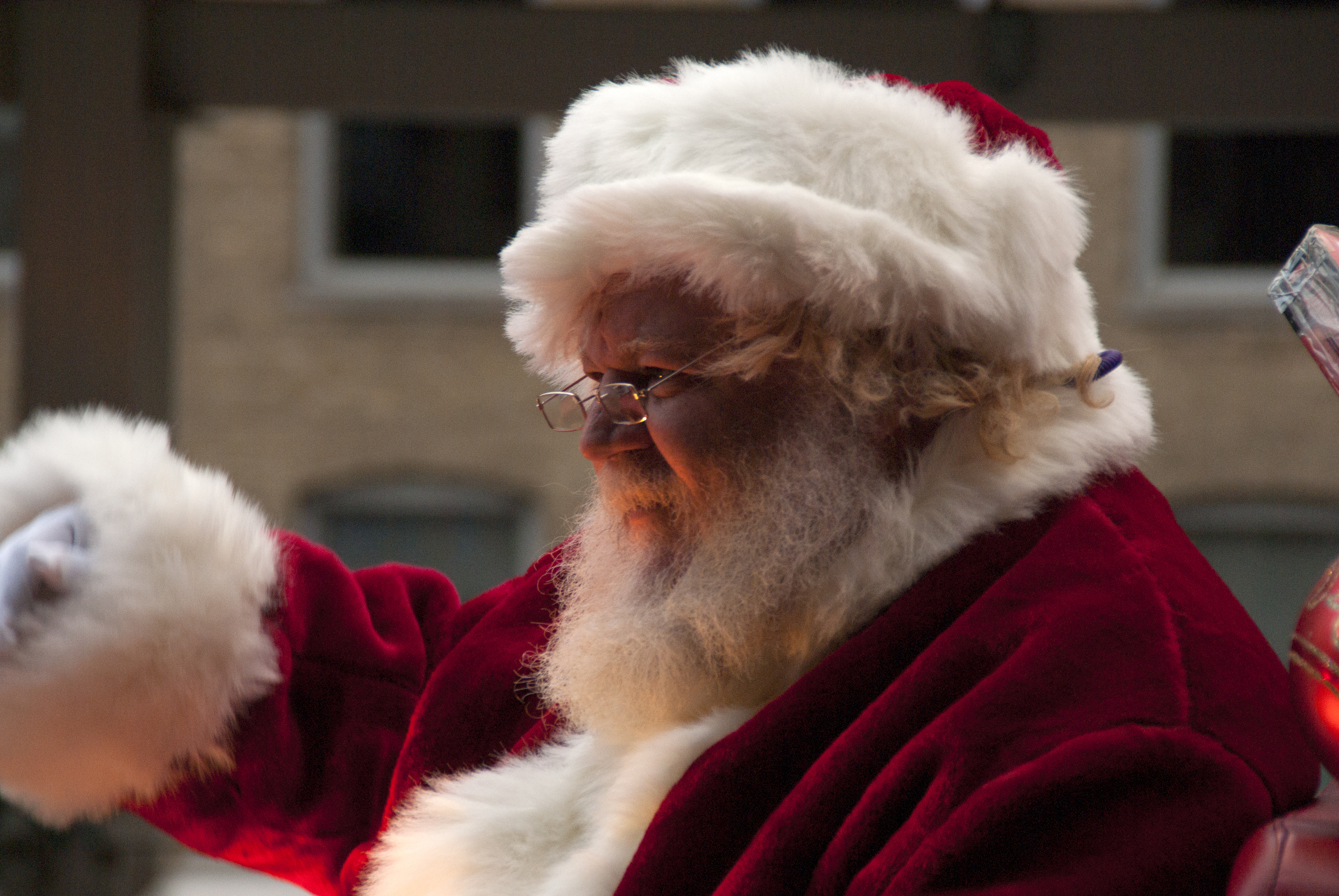
A man dressed as Santa Claus waves to children from an annual holiday train in Chicago, 2012.

Santa is generally depicted as a portly, jolly, white-bearded man, often with glasses, wearing a red outfit consisting of jacket, trousers and hat all trimmed with white fur, accessorised with black leather belt and boots, and carrying a bag full of gifts for children. The 1823 poem "A Visit from St. Nicholas" popularised this image in North America during the 19th century. The caricaturist and political cartoonist Thomas Nast also played a role in the creation of Santa's image. Connections have been drawn between the camauro–a soft red hat with white fur trim formerly worn by the pope–and the red-and-white vesture of Santa Claus.

The traditional 1823 Christmas poem "A Visit from St. Nicholas" relates that Santa has "a little round belly / That shook when he laugh'd, like a bowl full of jelly".

Though most often portrayed as white, Santa is also depicted as black or of other races. His race or colour is sometimes a subject of controversy.

=== Laugh ===
Ho ho ho is the way that many languages write out how Santa Claus laughs. "Ho, ho, ho! Merry Christmas!" It is the textual rendition of a particular type of deep-throated laugh or chuckle, most associated today with Santa Claus and Father Christmas.

The laughter of Santa Claus has long been an important attribute by which the character is identified, but it also does not appear in many non-English-speaking countries.

=== Home ===
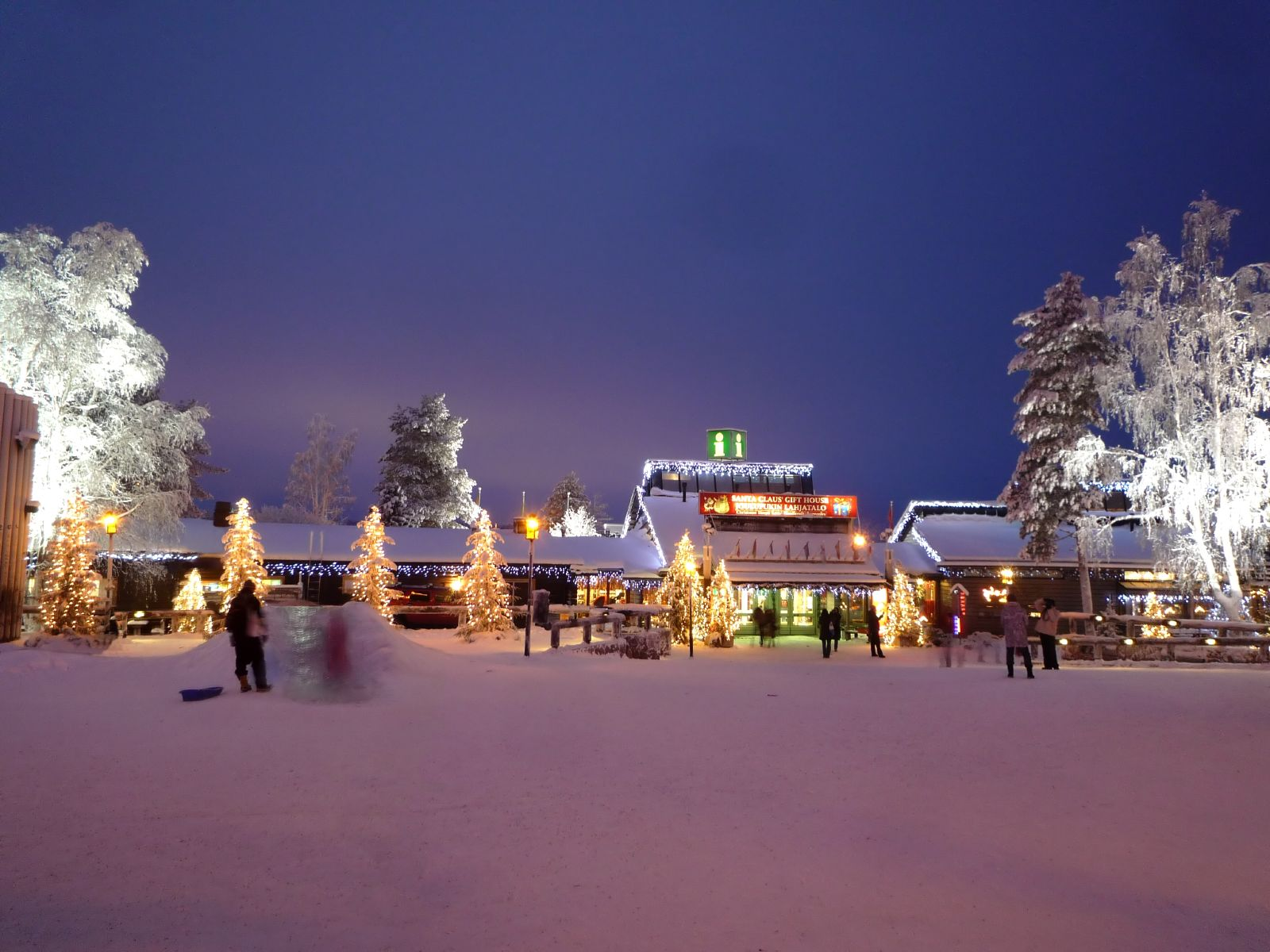
The Santa Claus Village in Lapland (Finland), the legendary "North Pole" home of Santa

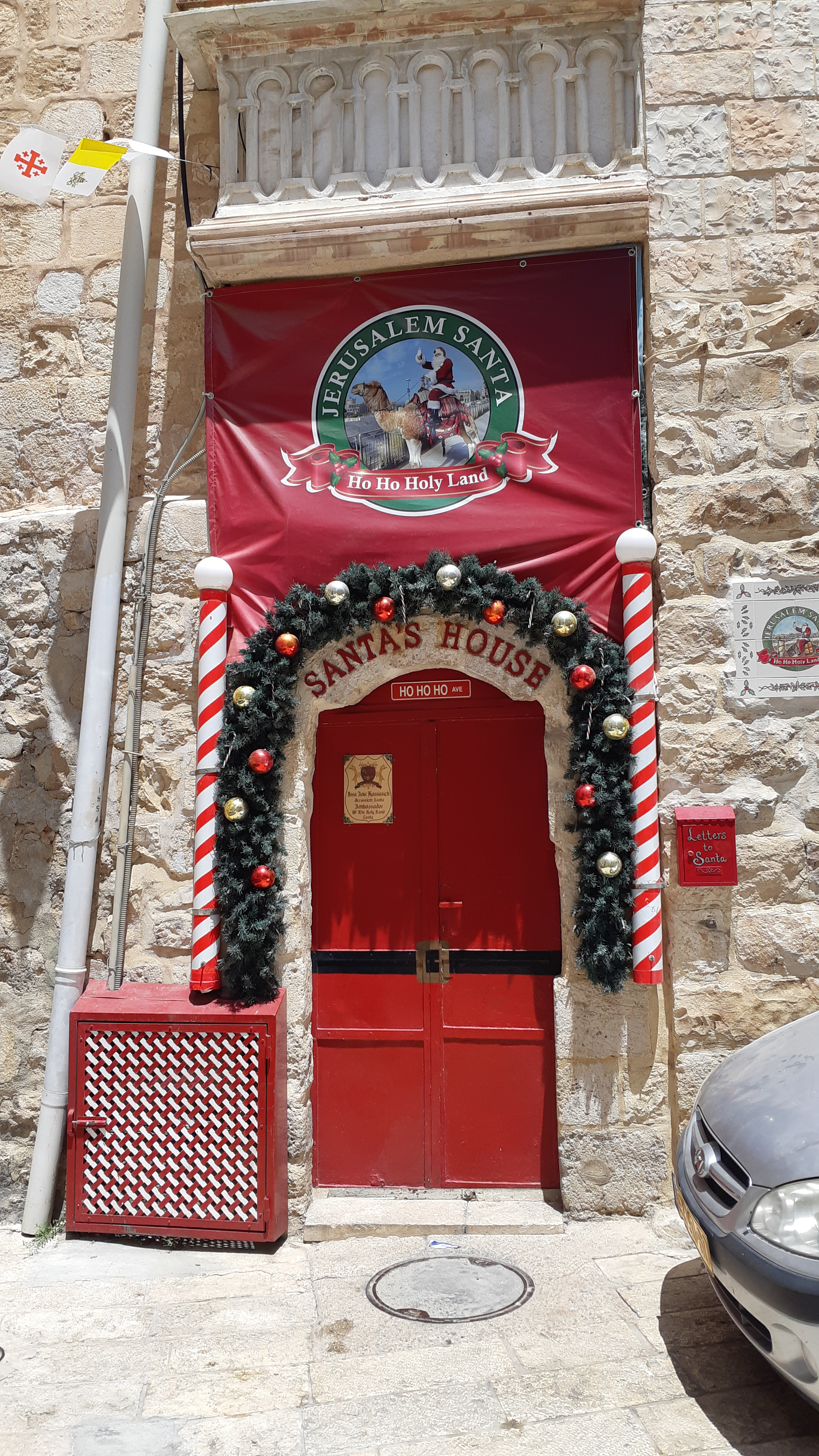
Santa's House at Jerusalem Old City, St. Peter Street

Santa Claus's home is traditionally said to include a residence and a workshop where he is said to create—often with the aid of elves or other supernatural beings—the gifts he is said to deliver to good children at Christmas. Some stories and legends include a village, inhabited by his helpers, surrounding his home and shop.

Santa is traditionally said to live at the North Pole, which according to Canada Post lies within Canadian jurisdiction in the postal code H0H 0H0 (a reference to Santa's laugh, "Ho ho ho", although postal codes starting with H are usually reserved for the island of Montréal in Québec). On 23 December 2008, Jason Kenney, the Minister of Citizenship, Immigration and Multiculturalism, formally awarded Canadian citizenship status to Santa Claus. "The Government of Canada wishes Santa the very best in his Christmas Eve duties and wants to let him know that, as a Canadian citizen, he has the automatic right to re-enter Canada once his trip around the world is complete," Kenney said in an official statement. There is also a city named North Pole in Alaska where a tourist attraction known as the "Santa Claus House" has been established. The United States Postal Service recommends mail to Santa's workshop are sent to 123 Elf Road, North Pole, 88888. Royal Mail recommends letters are sent to Santa/Father Christmas, Santa's Grotto, Reindeerland, XM4 5HQ.

Each Nordic country claims Santa's residence to be within their territory. Norway claims he lives in Drøbak. In Denmark, he is said to live in Greenland (near Uummannaq). In Sweden, the town of Mora has a theme park named Tomteland. The national postal terminal in Tomteboda in Stockholm receives children's letters for Santa. In Finland, Korvatunturi in Lapland has long been known as Santa's home, and two theme parks, Santa Claus Village and Santa Park are located near Rovaniemi. In Belarus, there is a home of Ded Moroz in Belovezhskaya Pushcha National Park.

In France, Santa is believed to reside in 1 Chemin des Nuages, Pôle Nord (1 Alley of Clouds, North Pole). The French national postal service has operated a service that allows children to send letters to Père Noël since 1962. In the period before Christmas, any physical letter in the country that is addressed to Santa Claus is sent to a specific location, where responses for the children's letters are written and sent back to the children.

=== Parades, department stores, and shopping malls ===
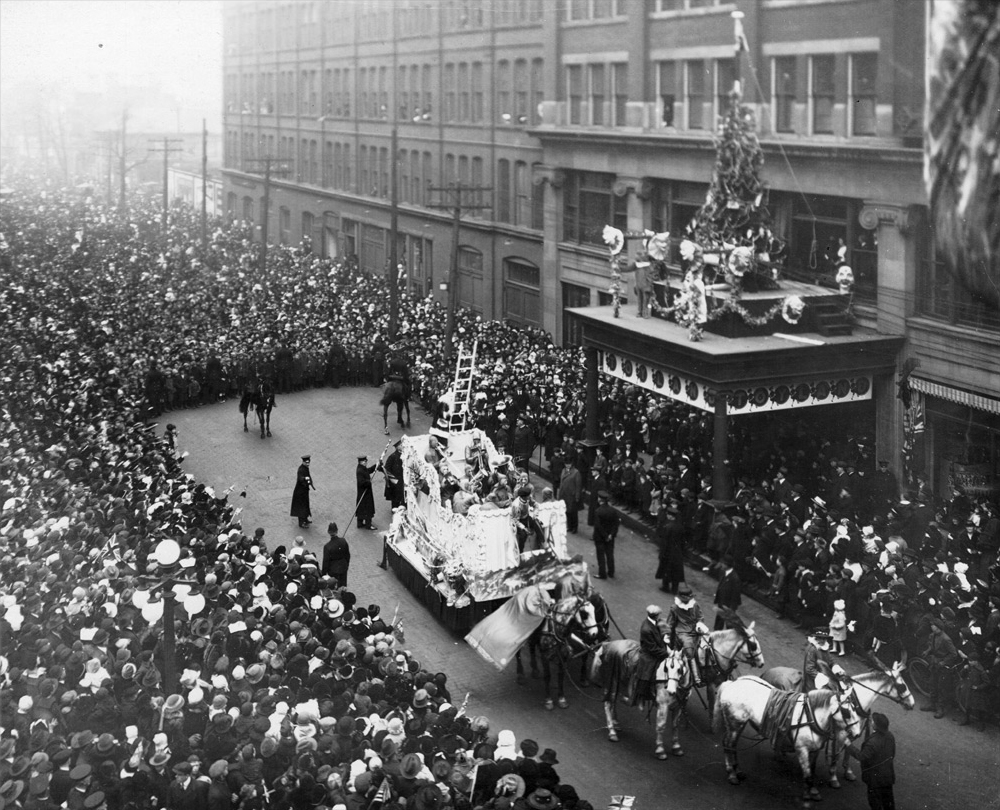
Eaton's Santa Claus Parade, 1918, Toronto, Canada. Having arrived at the Eaton's department store, Santa is readying his ladder to climb up onto the building.

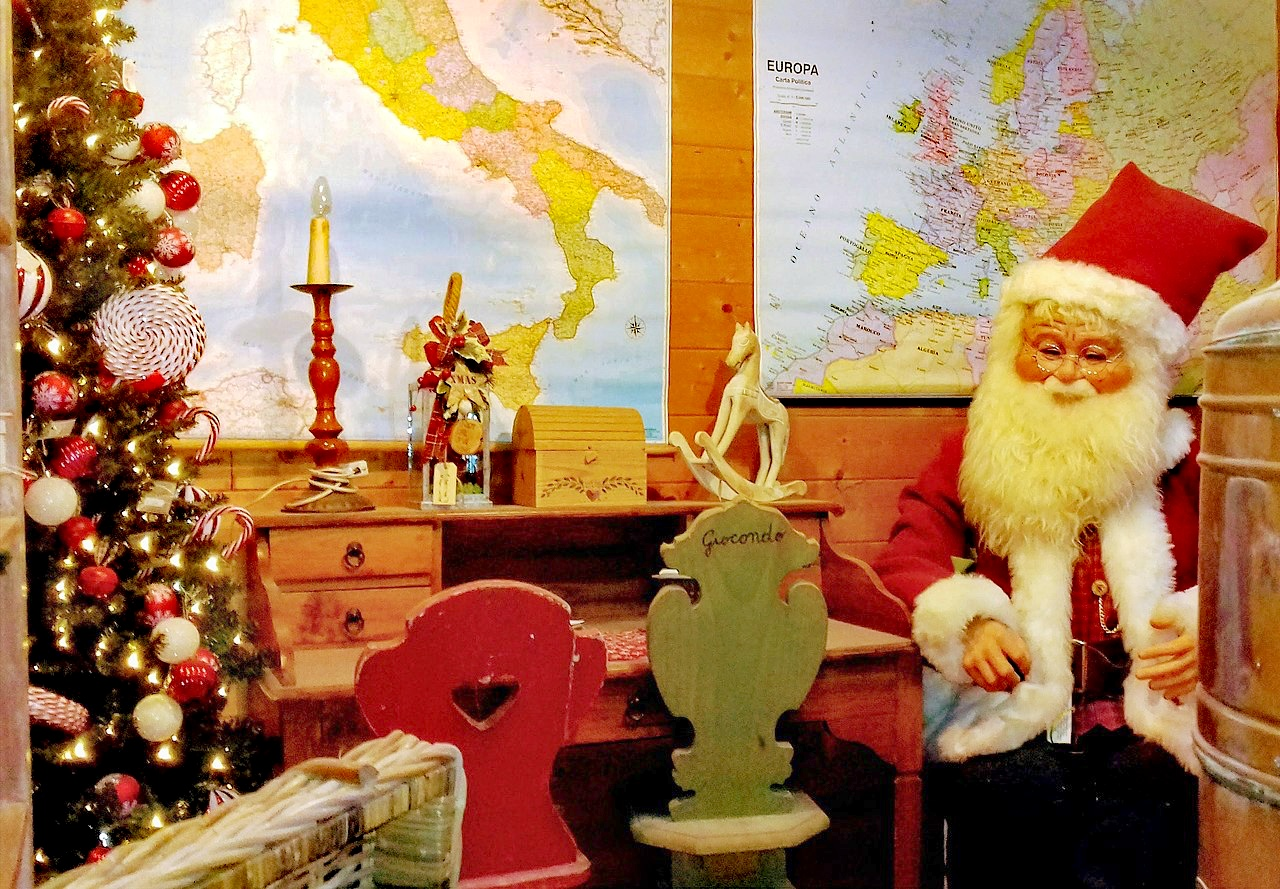
Representation of Santa Claus in Italy

Actors portraying Santa Claus are present at various venues in the weeks leading up to Christmas. A concept devised by the retail entrepreneur David Lewis, the first Christmas grotto opened in Lewis's department store in Liverpool, England, in 1879. The idea then took hold throughout Britain, before extending to Australian and American department stores in the 1890s, with James Edgar starting in 1890 in his Brockton, Massachusetts, department store. Having a Santa actor set up to take pictures with children is a ritual that dates back at least to 1918. An area is often set aside for the actors portraying Santa to use for the duration of the holiday season. It usually features a chair for the actors to sit in surrounded by various holiday-themed decorations. In Canada, malls operated by Oxford Properties established a process by which autistic children could "visit Santa Claus" at the mall without having to contend with crowds. The malls open early to allow entry only to families with autistic children, who have a private visit with the actor portraying Santa Claus. In 2012 the Southcentre Mall in Calgary was the first mall to offer this service. In the UK, the discount store Poundland changes the voice of its self-service checkouts to that of Santa Claus throughout the Christmas retail period.

There are schools offering instruction on how to act as Santa Claus. For example, the children's television producer Jonathan Meath studied at the International School of Santa Claus and earned the degree Master of Santa Claus in 2006. It blossomed into a second career for him, and after appearing in parades and malls, he appeared on the cover of the American monthly Boston Magazine as Santa. There are associations with members who portray Santa; for example, Mr. Meath was a board member of the international organisation called Fraternal Order of Real Bearded Santas.

Due to the COVID-19 pandemic, many Santa grottos were not operating for the 2020 Christmas season. Due to this, some companies offered video calls for a fee using apps such as Zoom where children could speak to an actor who was dressed as Santa Claus.

In 2021 Walt Disney World and Disneyland featured for the first time black cast members portraying Santa.

=== Letter writing ===
Children sometimes write letters to Santa Claus, often with a Christmas wish list. Some postal services collect and respond to letters addressed to Santa. Writing to Santa can promote literacy, including reading, writing, and, in digital contexts, computer and email skills. For many children, a letter to Santa is their first experience of correspondence. With guidance from a parent or teacher, they learn about letter structure, salutations, and the use of addresses and postcodes.

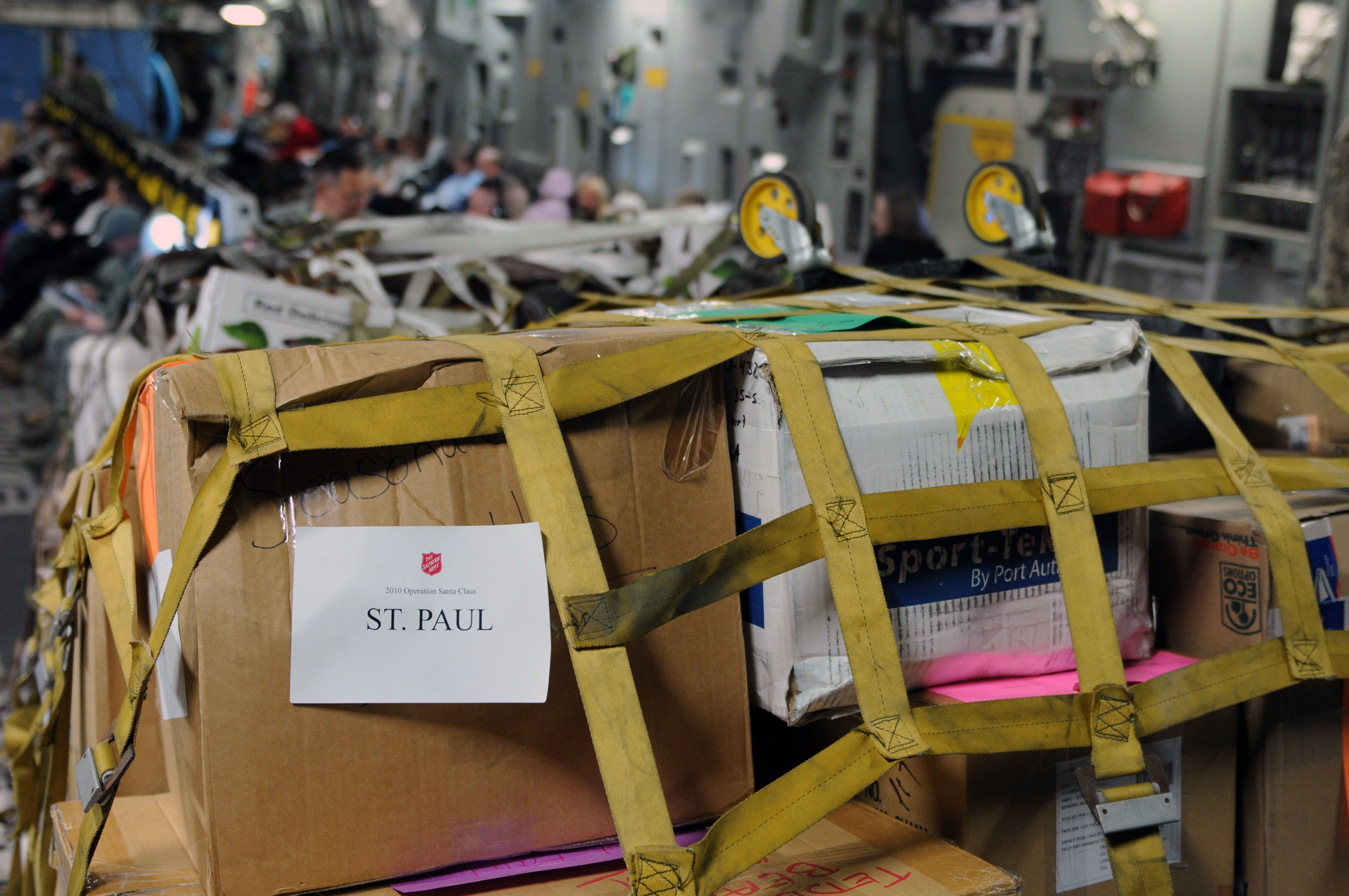
Gifts like food, toys and school supplies aboard a Boeing C-17 Globemaster III flight to St. Paul Island, Alaska, as part of the Alaska National Guard's Operation Santa Claus annual outreach to the state's remote communities.

The United States Postal Service (USPS) operates the oldest national program for answering letters to Santa Claus. USPS Operation Santa, which began in 1912 at the historic James Farley Post Office in New York, organizes letters addressed to Santa and allows volunteers to adopt and respond to them.

According to a 2007 survey of national postal operations by the Universal Postal Union (UPU), La Poste (France) received the most letters for Santa Claus (or Père Noël) in 2006, with 1,220,000 letters received from 126 countries. In 2007 it recruited someone specially to answer the enormous volume of mail for Santa that was being sent from Russia. Canada Post replied to letters in 26 languages, Deutsche Post in 16 languages. The survey reported that although some postal operators accept messages via email, Santa receives far more letters than emails.

National postal operators that allow children to send letters to Santa using an online form and receive a reply include Canada Post, La Poste, and New Zealand Post. In France in 2010, by December 6 a team of 60 postal employees had sent reply cards in response to 80,000 online request forms and more than 500,000 physical letters.

Countries whose national postal operators received letters to Santa and other end-of-year holiday figures in 2012, and the number of letters received, include Austria (6,500), Australia (150,000), Brazil (964,315), Canada (1,350,000), Germany (300,000), Spain (300,000), United States (more than 1,000,000), Finland (550,000), France (1,700,000), Great Britain (more than 800,000), Greece (80,000), Hungary (3,000), Ireland (130,000), Italy (130,000), Lebanon (8,800), Norway (no figure available), Portugal (100,000), Sweden (30,000), Switzerland (17,000) and Russia (350,000).

From 2002 to 2014, Canada Post replied to approximately one million letters or more each year, answering a total of more than 24.7 million letters. As of 2015, it responds to over 1.5 million letters annually, in more than 30 languages, including Braille, with each letter answered in the language in which it was written.

In Latin America, letters are sometimes tied to balloons instead of being sent through the mail.

An example of a public and private cooperative venture is the opportunity for expatriate and local children and parents to receive postmarked mail and greeting cards from Santa during December in the Finnish Embassy in Beijing, Santa Claus Village in Rovaniemi, Finland, and the People's Republic of China Postal System's Beijing International Post Office.

=== Tracking ===
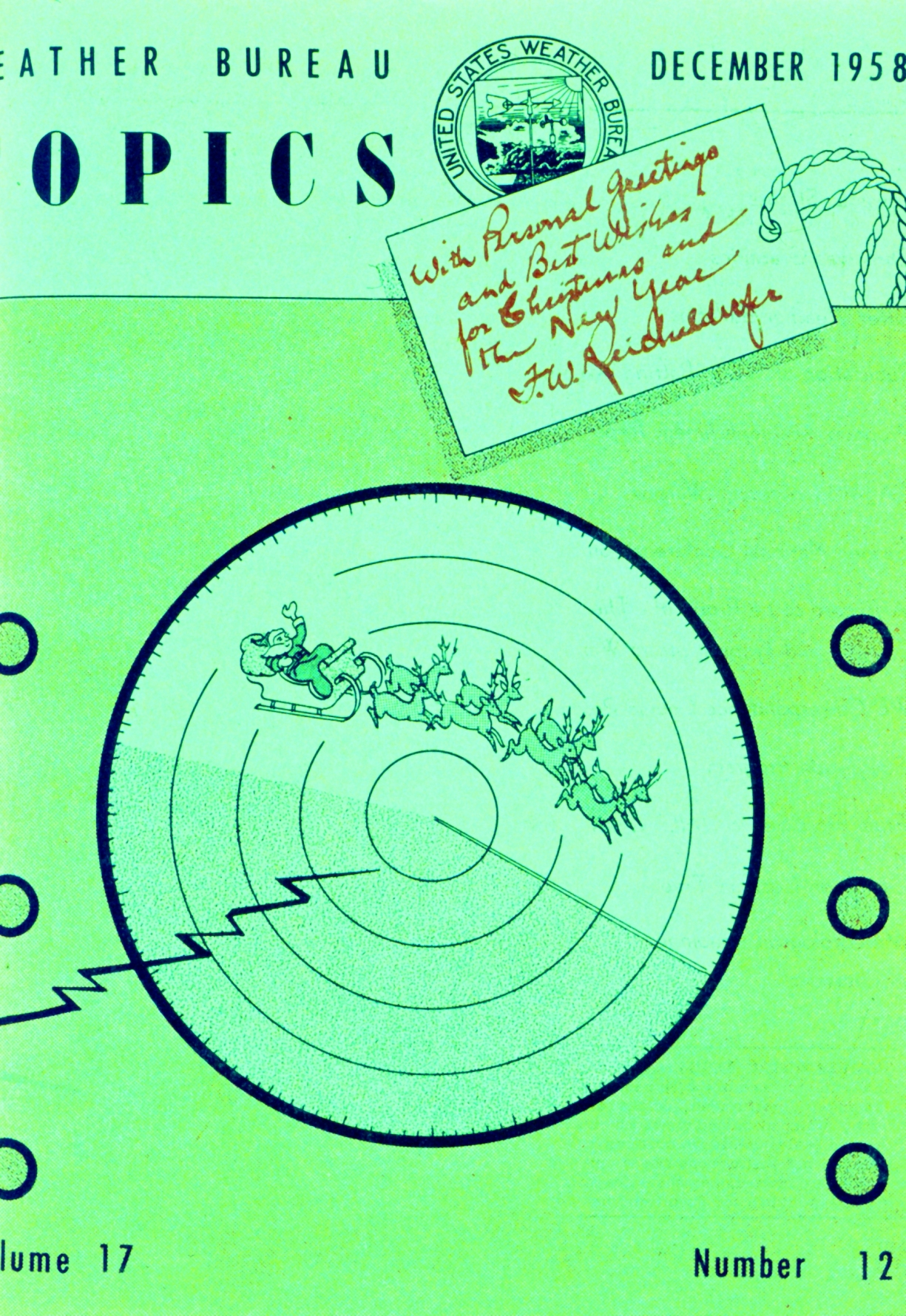
The Christmas issue of NOAA's Weather Bureau Topics with "Santa Claus" streaking across a weather radar screen, 1958

A number of websites have been created by various organisations that have claimed to track Santa Claus's yearly journey. Some, such as NORAD Tracks Santa, the Google Santa Tracker, the emailSanta.com tracker and the Santa Update Project, have endured. Others, such as the Airservices Australia Tracks Santa Project, the Dallas/Fort Worth International Airport's Tracks Santa Project, the NASA Tracks Santa Project, and the Bing Maps Platform Tracks Santa Project, have not.

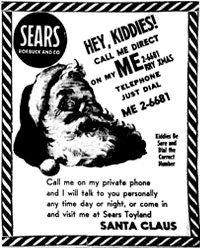
1955 Sears ad with the misprinted telephone number that led to the creation of the NORAD Tracks Santa program

NORAD Tracks Santa originated in 1955 when a Sears-Roebuck ad incorrectly printed the number for their Santa hotline and the Continental Air Defense Command received the calls intended for the Sears hotline. The program was transferred to NORAD when it was jointly founded by the United States and Canada in 1958.

In December 2000, the Weather Channel built upon these local efforts to provide a national Christmas Eve "Santa tracking" effort, called "SantaWatch", in cooperation with NASA, the International Space Station, and Silicon Valley–based new multimedia firm Dreamtime Holdings. Currently, most local television stations in the United States and Canada rely upon outside established "Santa tracking" efforts, such as NORAD Tracks Santa.

In addition to providing holiday-themed entertainment, "Santa tracking" websites raise interest in space technology and exploration, serve to educate children in geography and encourage them to take an interest in science.

Many websites exist that claim to track Santa and his workshop. One particular website called emailSanta.com was created when a 1997 Canada Post strike prevented Alan Kerr's young niece and nephews from sending their letters to Santa; in a few weeks, over 1,000 emails to Santa were received, and the site had received 1,000 emails a day one year later. Some websites, such as Santa's page on Microsoft's former Windows Live Spaces or emailSanta.com, have used or still use "bots" or other automated programs to compose and send personalised and realistic replies. Microsoft's website has given occasional profane results.

== Criticism ==
=== Opposition from some Christian denominations ===
Santa Claus has partial Christian roots in Saint Nicholas, particularly in the high church denominations that practise the veneration of him and other saints. Various Christian denominations have differing opinions of Santa Claus, ranging from acceptance to denouncement. Some Christians, particularly Calvinists such as the Puritans, disliked the idea of Santa Claus as well as Christmas in general, believing that the lavish celebrations were not in accordance with their faith. Other nonconformist Christians condemn the materialist focus of contemporary gift-giving and see Santa Claus as the symbol of that culture.

Condemnation of Christmas was prevalent among 17th-century English Puritans and Dutch Calvinists. The American colonies established by these groups reflected this view. Tolerance for Christmas increased after the Restoration, although Puritan attitudes toward the holiday remained unfavorable. In the Dutch New Netherland colony, season celebrations focused on New Year's Day.

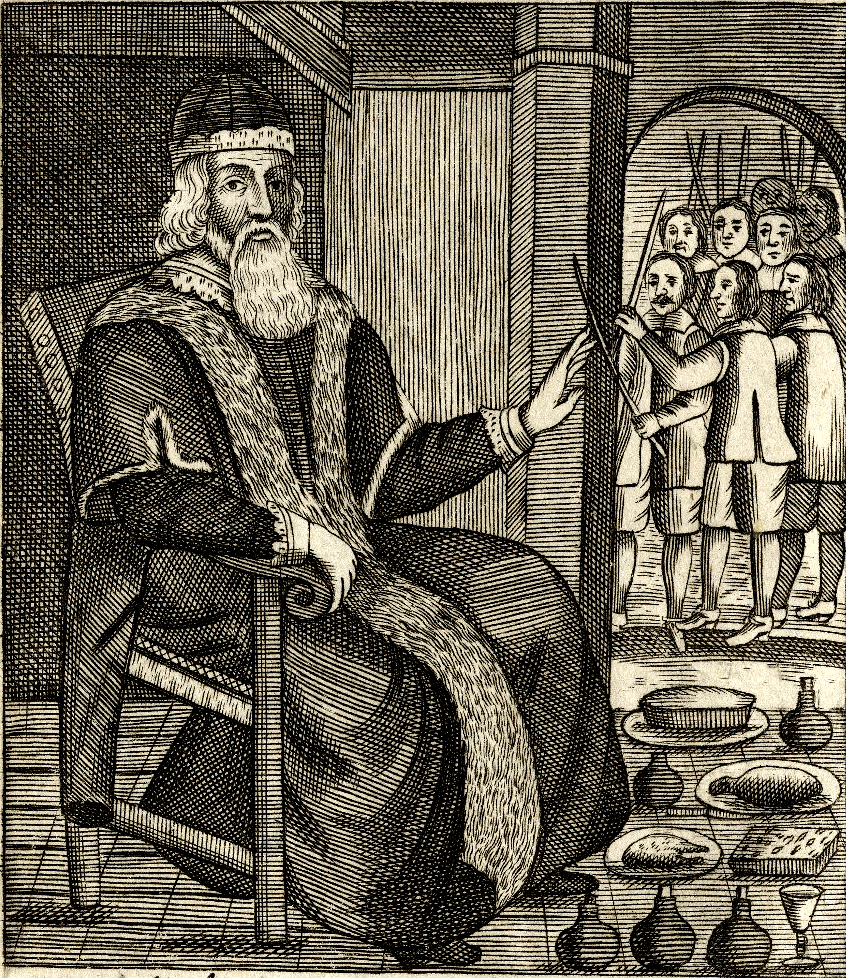
Excerpt from Josiah King's The Examination and Tryal of Father Christmas (1686), published shortly after Christmas was reinstated as a holy day in England

Following the Restoration of the monarchy and with Puritans out of power in England, the ban on Christmas was satirised in works such as Josiah King's The Examination and Tryal of Old Father Christmas; Together with his Clearing by the Jury (1686).

In 1958 Reverend Paul Nedergaard, a clergyman in Copenhagen, declared Santa a "heathen goblin" (Danish: en hedensk trold) after Santa's image was used on the annual Christmas stamp (Julemærke) for a Danish children's welfare organisation.

Mary Baker Eddy, the founder of the Christian Science movement, wrote: "the children should not be taught that Santa Claus has aught to do with this Christmas pastime. A deceit or falsehood is never wise. Too much cannot be done towards guarding and guiding well the germinating and inclining thought of childhood. To mould aright the first impressions of innocence, aids in perpetuating purity and in unfolding the immortal model, man in His image and likeness."

=== Opposition under state atheism ===
Under the Marxist–Leninist doctrine of state atheism in the Soviet Union after its foundation in 1917, Christmas celebrations—along with other religious holidays—were prohibited as a result of the Soviet antireligious campaign. The League of Militant Atheists encouraged schoolchildren to campaign against Christmas traditions, among them being Santa Claus and the Christmas tree, as well as other Christian holidays including Easter; the League established an antireligious holiday to be the 31st of each month as a replacement.

In December 2018, the city management office of Langfang in Hebei province, China, released a statement stating that people caught selling Christmas trees, wreaths, stockings or Santa Claus figures in the city would be punished by authorities.

=== Symbol of commercialism ===
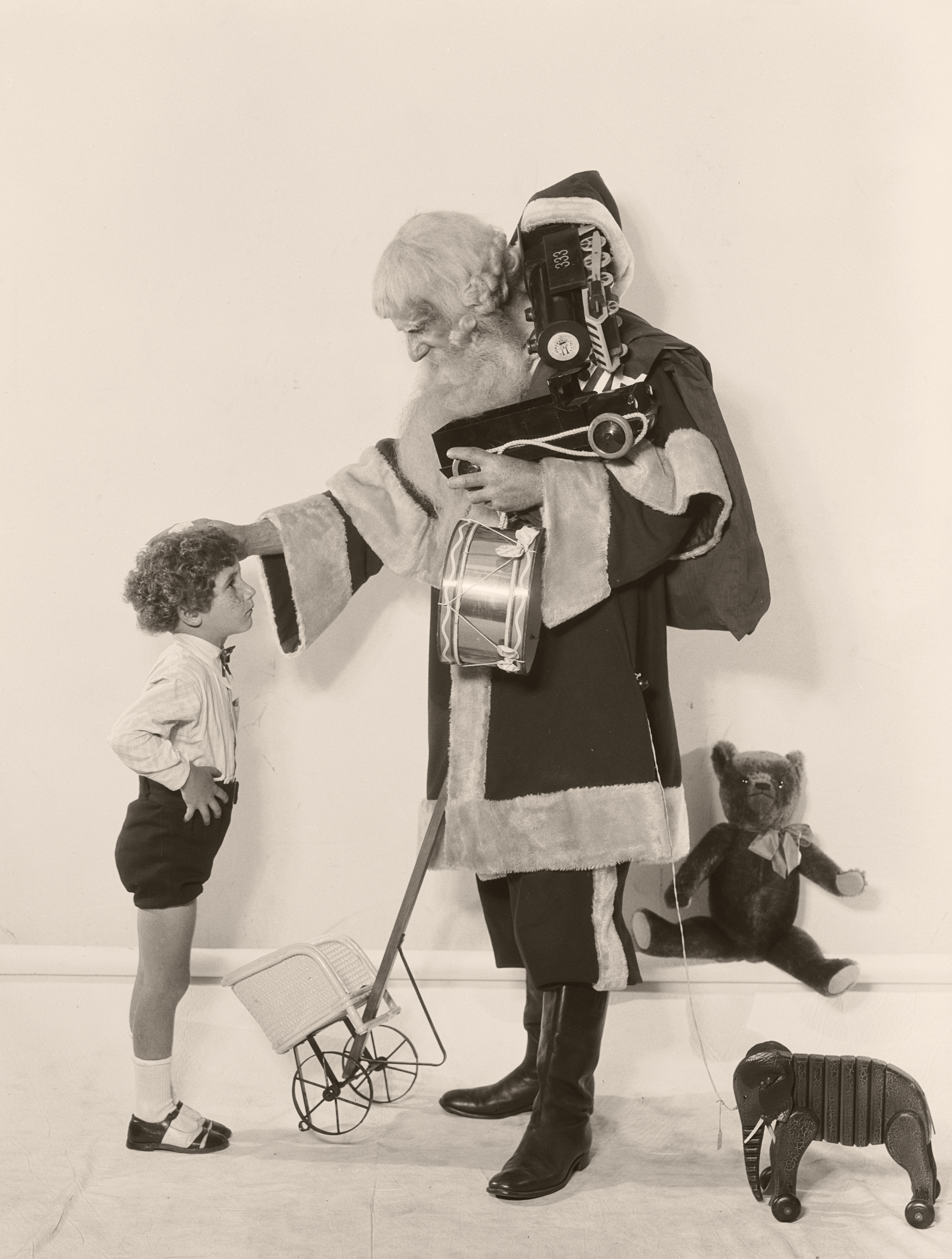
Santa Claus, Sydney, 1933

Jeremy Seal, author of the 2005 book Nicholas: The Epic Journey from Saint to Santa Claus, said in an interview that Santa's 19th-century elements, like reindeer, a sleigh, and bells, were reminiscent of the real world.

Writing in Mothering magazine, Carol Jean-Swanson makes similar points, noting that the original figure of Saint Nicholas gave only to those who were needy and that today Santa Claus seems to be more about conspicuous consumption: "He [...] mirrors some of our highest ideals: childhood purity and innocence, selfless giving, unfaltering love, justice, and mercy. [...] The problem is that, in the process, he has become burdened with some of society's greatest challenges: materialism, corporate greed, and domination by the media."

In the Czech Republic, a group of advertising professionals started a website against Santa Claus, a relatively recent phenomenon in that country. In the Czech tradition, presents are delivered by Ježíšek, which translates as Baby Jesus.

A law in the US state of Ohio prohibits the usage of Santa Claus or his image to sell alcoholic beverages.

=== Representation to children ===
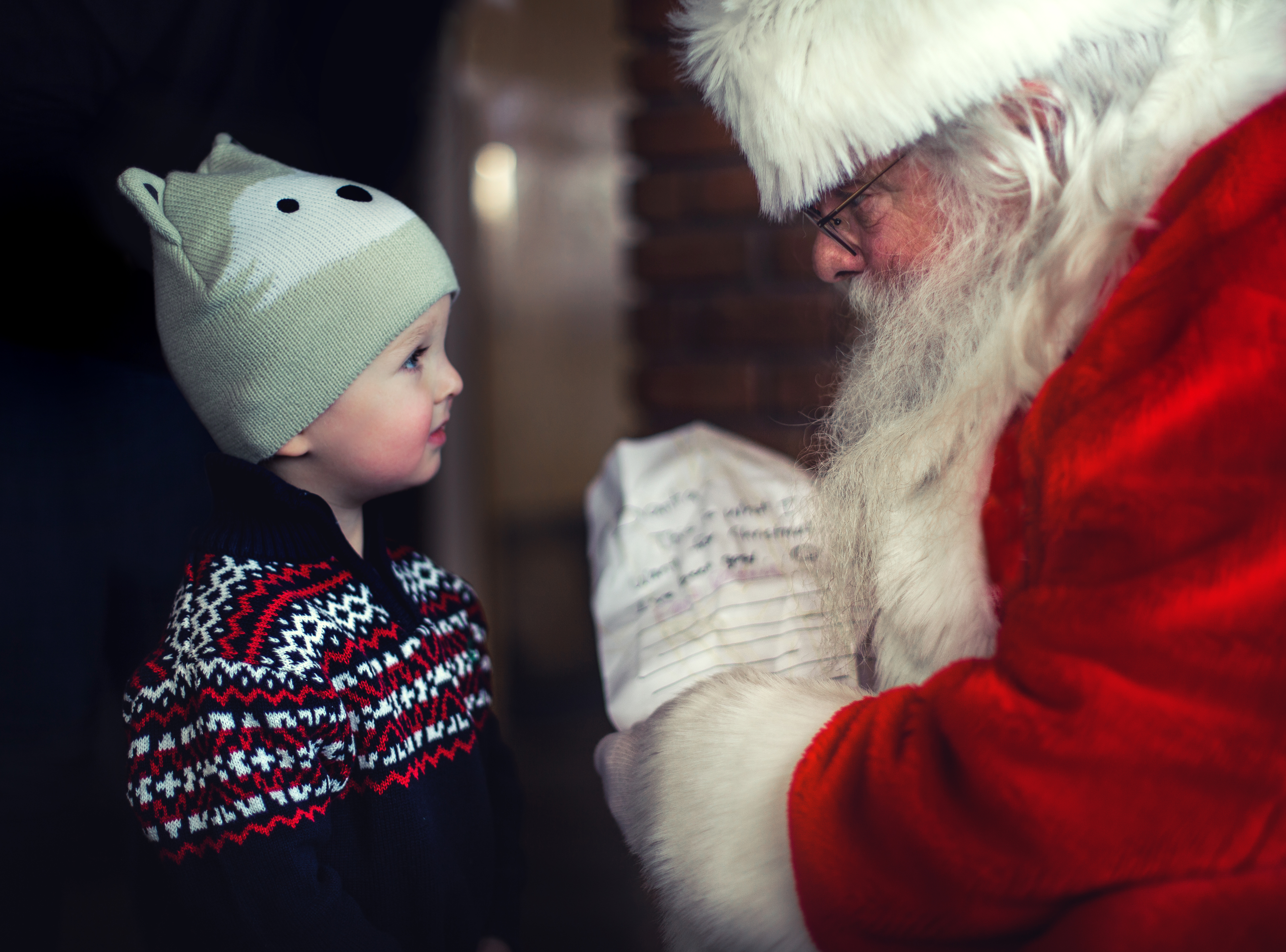
Parent-initiated activities, like visiting a Santa actor at a shopping centre, promote belief in Santa Claus by young children.

Psychologists generally differentiate between telling fictional stories that feature Santa Claus and actively deceiving a child into believing that Santa Claus is real. Imaginative play, in which children know that Santa Claus is only a character in a story, but pretend that he is real, just like they pretend that superheroes or other fictional characters are real, is valuable. Actively deceiving a child into believing in Santa Claus's real-world existence, sometimes even to the extent of fabricating false evidence to convince them despite their growing natural doubts, does not result in imaginative play and can promote credulity in the face of strong evidence against Santa Claus's existence. Children will eventually know that Santa is a fictional character.

Babies and toddlers do not understand the concept of a fictional character, but most children become developmentally able to "believe in" Santa Claus around age three or four. The prevalence of belief in Santa Claus is high at age five, and declines precipitously when children are seven or eight years old. Although the age at disillusionment has been fairly stable for decades – in 1978, 85% of American five year olds believed that Santa was real, but only 25% of eight year olds still did – it may be getting slightly lower over time. Age-inappropriate belief in Santa is seen in some older children and teenagers who have autism or other neurodevelopmental disorders.

The psychology professor Jacqueline Woolley helped to conduct a study that found that children seemed competent in their use of logic, evidence, and comparative reasoning even though they might conclude that Santa Claus or other fanciful creatures were real. According to Woolley, the existence of Santa Claus is affirmed to children by "friends, books, TV and movies" and by "hard evidence" of "half-eaten cookies and empty milk glasses".

Typical objections to presenting Santa Claus as a literally real person, rather than a story, include that:

- lying is normally bad;
- parents intentionally lying to their children promotes distrust;
- it promotes selfishness, greed, and materialism;
- it associates good behavior with being materially rewarded with presents from Santa Claus; and
- tricking children into believing falsehoods interferes with the development of critical thinking.

Some have argued that Santa Claus prioritises parents' short-term happiness in seeing children excited about Santa Claus, and their nostalgic willingness to prolong the age of magical thinking, over children. The philosopher David Kyle Johnson wrote, "It's a lie, it degrades your parental trustworthiness, it encourages credulity, it does not encourage imagination, and it's equivalent to bribing your kids for good behavior."

Others see little harm in the belief in Santa Claus. The psychologist Tamar Murachver said that because it is a cultural, not parental, lie, it does not usually undermine parental trust. Woolley posited that it is perhaps "kinship with the adult world" that causes children not to be angry that they were lied to for so long. In one study, it was found that children did not trust their parents less and adults did not recall an increase in lack of trust. Austin Cline argued that, to get children's belief in Santa Claus, a complicated series of elaborate lies and defenses over time is needed, rather than a few single-time lies. Most children do not remain angry or embarrassed about the deception for very long. They are most likely to have a positive feeling about it if they are able to figure it out logically (e.g., by realising the impossibility of one person visiting every home in a single night) and gradually. According to the psychologist John Condry, "The most common response to finding out the truth was that they felt older and more mature. They now knew something that the younger kids did not". In other studies, a small fraction of children felt betrayed by their parents, but disappointment was a more common response. Some children have reacted strongly, including rejecting the family's religious beliefs on the grounds that if the parents lied about the existence of Santa Claus, then they might lie about the existence of God as well. The New Zealand Skeptics also see no harm in parents telling their children that Santa is real. The spokesperson Vicki Hyde said, "It would be a hard-hearted parent indeed who frowned upon the innocent joys of our children's cultural heritage. We save our bah humbugs for the things that exploit the vulnerable."

== See also ==
=== Related figures ===
- Amu Nowruz — "Uncle New Year"; Iranian gift-bringing figure associated with spring and the new year in the traditional Iranian calendar
- Ayaz Ata — Grandfather Frost in Turkic folklore
- Befana — a friendly witch who delivers gifts to children on 5 January
- Christkind — a popular giftbringer in Central Europe for Christmas
- Companions of Saint Nicholas
- Ded Moroz — Russian equivalent
- Father Christmas — British equivalent
- Joulupukki — Finnish Santa Claus
- Moș Gerilă — name of a character from Romanian communist propaganda
- Nikolaus — Gift bringer popular in Central Europe and the Benelux
- Olentzero — traditional Basque character who has recently been transformed into a Santa-like figure
- Saint Basil — who is believed to bring Christmas gifts for children in Greek Orthodox tradition
- Sinterklaas — Dutch Nikolaus
- The Three Kings — The Biblical three wise men brings gifts on 6 January in Spain

=== Other ===
- Jack Frost and Old Man Winter — Mythical characters associated with winter
- Christmas controversies
- Flying Santa —A northeastern US tradition of pilots delivering presents to families in remote lighthouses
- Fraternal Order of Real Bearded Santas
- Pancho Claus, a Tex-Mex version of Santa Claus
- Santa Claus, Indiana —A small Midwestern United States town named after the figure, home to Holiday World amusement park
- SantaCon
