= Père Noël =

Christmas giftbringer in French-speaking areas

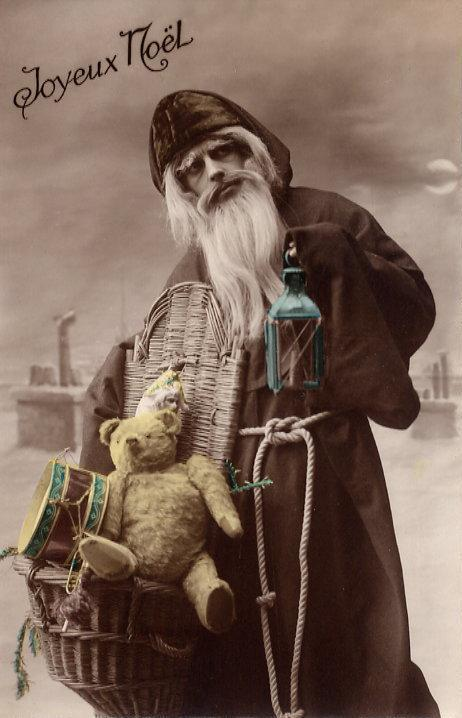
Père Noël

Père Noël (French pronunciation: [pɛʁ nɔ.ɛl]), "Father Christmas", sometimes called 'Papa Noël' ("Dad Christmas"), is a legendary gift-bringer at Christmas in France and other French-speaking areas, identified with the Father Christmas and/or Santa Claus of English-speaking territories. Though they were traditionally different, all of them are now the same character, with different names, and the shared characteristics of a red outfit, workshop at the North Pole/Lapland, and a team of reindeer.

According to tradition, on Christmas Eve children leave their shoes by the fireplace filled with carrots and treats for Père Noël's donkey, Gui (French for "Mistletoe") before they go to bed. Père Noël takes the offerings and, if the child has been good, leaves presents in their place. Presents are traditionally small enough to fit in the shoes; candy, money or small toys.

Père Noël is sometimes confused with another, older character. In Eastern France (Alsace and Lorraine regions), in the Netherlands, in Belgium, in Germany, in Switzerland and in Eastern Europe (and nowadays also in the eastern states of the US) there is a parallel tradition to celebrate Saint Nicolas or Sinterklaas on December 5 or 6. He is followed by Le Père Fouettard, who exists also in different parts of Germany (Knecht Ruprecht or Belsnickel), Austria (Krampus), the Netherlands and Belgium (Zwarte Piet in Dutch, Le Père Fouettard in French). Le Père Fouettard is a sinister figure dressed in black who accompanies Saint Nicolas and spanks children who have behaved badly.

In Argentina, Uruguay, Colombia, and Brazil, due to the influence of French culture in the 19th century, the name of Papá Noel/Papai Noel was adopted, opposing for example the name of Pai Natal in Portugal. In Turkey there is Noel Baba.

In Louisiana Cajun culture, a version of Papa Noël is modeled after Santa Claus, in which he arrives at homes in a pirogue towed by eight alligators. In some families, his visit is followed by the arrival of a figure called La Christine on New Year's Eve bearing sweets and nuts; in others, La Christine is simply another designation for Santa Claus.
