= Father Christmas =

Folkloric figure originating in England

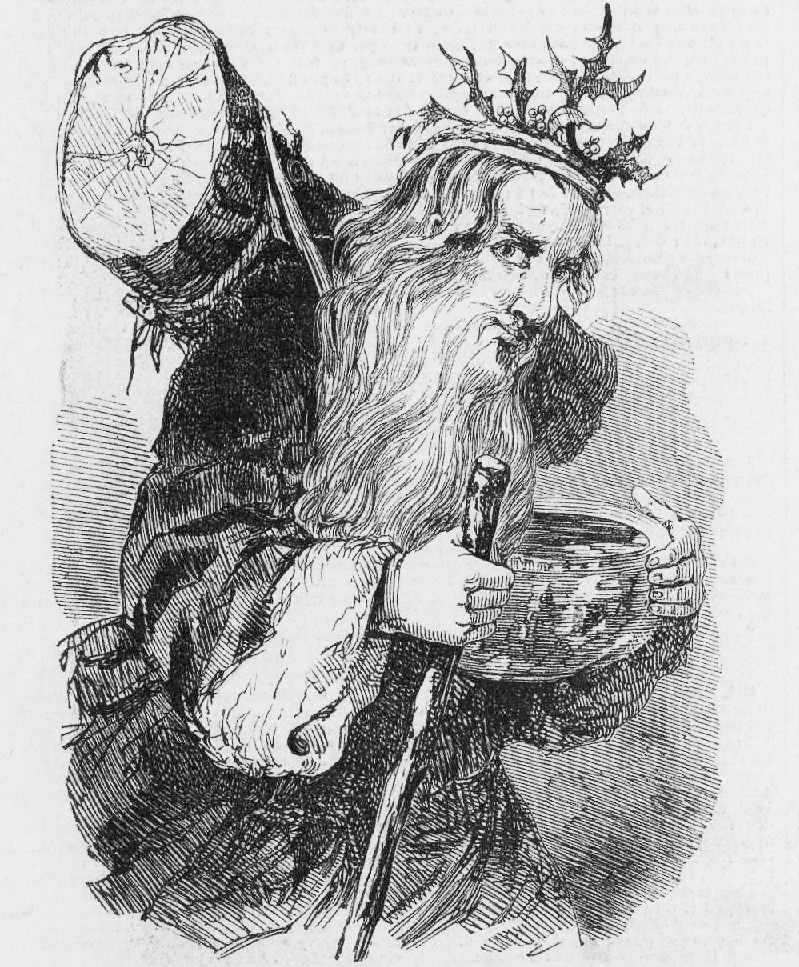
- An 1848 depiction of Father Christmas crowned with a holly wreath, holding a staff and a wassail bowl and carrying the Yule log

In-universe information
- Aliases: Saint Nicholas; Saint Nick; Santa Claus

Father Christmas is the traditional English name for the personification of Christmas. Although now known as a Christmas gift-bringer, and typically considered to be synonymous with Santa Claus, he was originally part of a much older and unrelated English folkloric tradition. The recognisably modern figure of the English Father Christmas developed in the late Victorian period, but Christmas had been personified for centuries before then.

English personifications of Christmas were first recorded in the 15th century, with Father Christmas himself first appearing in the mid 17th century in the aftermath of the English Civil War. The Puritan-controlled English government had legislated to abolish Christmas, considering it popish, and had outlawed its traditional customs. Royalist political pamphleteers, linking the old traditions with their cause, adopted Old Father Christmas as the symbol of 'the good old days' of feasting and good cheer. Following the Restoration in 1660, Father Christmas's profile declined. His character was maintained during the late 18th and into the 19th century by the Christmas folk plays later known as mummers' plays.

Until Victorian times, Father Christmas was concerned with adult feasting and merry-making. He had no particular connection with children, nor with the giving of presents, nocturnal visits, stockings, chimneys or reindeer. But as later Victorian Christmases developed into child-centric family festivals, Father Christmas became a bringer of gifts.

The popular American myth of Santa Claus arrived in England in the 1850s and Father Christmas started to take on Santa Claus's attributes. By the 1880s the new customs had become established, with the nocturnal visitor sometimes being known as Santa Claus and sometimes as Father Christmas. He was often illustrated wearing a long red hooded gown trimmed with white fur.

Most residual distinctions between Father Christmas and Santa Claus largely faded away in the early years of the 20th century, and modern dictionaries consider the terms Father Christmas and Santa Claus to be synonymous.

== Early midwinter celebrations ==
The custom of merrymaking and feasting at Christmastide first appears in the historical record during the High Middle Ages (c 1100–1300). This almost certainly represented a continuation of pre-Christian midwinter celebrations in Britain of which—as the historian Ronald Hutton has pointed out—"we have no details at all". Personifications came later, and when they did they reflected the existing custom.

== 15th century—the first English personifications of Christmas ==
The first known English personification of Christmas was associated with merry-making, singing and drinking. A carol attributed to Richard Smart, Rector of Plymtree in Devon from 1435 to 1477, has 'Sir Christemas' announcing the news of Christ's birth and encouraging his listeners to drink: "Buvez bien par toute la compagnie, / Make good cheer and be right merry, / And sing with us now joyfully: Nowell, nowell."

Many Christmas customs of the Late Middle Ages incorporated both sacred and secular themes. In Norwich in January 1443, at a traditional battle between the flesh and the spirit (represented by Christmas and Lent), John Gladman, crowned and disguised as 'King of Christmas', rode behind a pageant of the months "disguysed as the seson requird" on a horse decorated with tinfoil.

== 16th century—feasting, entertainment and music ==
In most of England the archaic word 'Yule' had been replaced by 'Christmas' by the 11th century, but in some places 'Yule' survived as the normal dialect term. The City of York maintained an annual St Thomas's Day (21 December) celebration of The Riding of Yule and his Wife which involved a figure representing Yule who carried bread and a leg of lamb. In 1572, the riding was suppressed on the orders of Edmund Grindal, the Archbishop of York (term 1570–1576), who complained of the "undecent and uncomely disguising" which drew multitudes of people from divine service.

Such personifications, illustrating the medieval fondness for pageantry and symbolism, extended throughout the Tudor and Stuart periods with Lord of Misrule characters, sometimes called 'Captain Christmas', 'Prince Christmas' or 'The Christmas Lord', presiding over feasting and entertainment in grand houses, university colleges and Inns of Court.

In his allegorical play Summer's Last Will and Testament, written in about 1592, Thomas Nashe introduced for comic effect a miserly Christmas character who refuses to keep the feast. He is reminded by Summer of the traditional role that he ought to be playing: "Christmas, how chance thou com’st not as the rest, / Accompanied with some music, or some song? / A merry carol would have graced thee well; / Thy ancestors have used it heretofore."

== 17th century—religion and politics ==
=== Puritan criticisms ===
Early 17th century writers used the techniques of personification and allegory as a means of defending Christmas from attacks by radical Protestants.

Responding to a perceived decline in the levels of Christmas hospitality provided by the gentry, Ben Jonson in Christmas, His Masque (1616) dressed his Old Christmas in out-of-date fashions: "attir'd in round Hose, long Stockings, a close Doublet, a high crownd Hat with a Broach, a long thin beard, a Truncheon, little Ruffes, white shoes, his Scarffes, and Garters tyed crosse". Surrounded by guards, Christmas asserts his rightful place in the Protestant Church and protests against attempts to exclude him: "Why Gentlemen, doe you know what you doe? ha! would you ha'kept me out? Christmas, old Christmas? Christmas of London, and Captaine Christmas? ... they would not let me in: I must come another time! a good jeast, as if I could come more then once a yeare; why, I am no dangerous person, and so I told my friends, o'the Guard. I am old Gregorie Christmas still, and though I come out of Popes-head-alley as good a Protestant, as any i'my Parish."

The stage directions to The Springs Glorie, a 1638 court masque by Thomas Nabbes, state, "Christmas is personated by an old reverend Gentleman in a furr'd gown and cappe &c." Shrovetide and Christmas dispute precedence, and Shrovetide issues a challenge: "I say Christmas you are past date, you are out of the Almanack. Resigne, resigne." To which Christmas responds: "Resigne to thee! I that am the King of good cheere and feasting, though I come but once a yeare to raigne over bak't, boyled, roast and plum-porridge, will have being in despight of thy lard-ship."

This sort of character was to feature repeatedly over the next 250 years in pictures, stage plays and folk dramas. Initially known as 'Sir Christmas' or 'Lord Christmas', he later became increasingly referred to as 'Father Christmas'.

=== Puritan revolution—enter 'Father Christmas' ===
The rise of puritanism led to accusations of popery in connection with pre-reformation Christmas traditions. When the Puritans took control of government in the mid-1640s they made concerted efforts to abolish Christmas and to outlaw its traditional customs. For 15 years from around 1644, before and during the Interregnum of 1649-1660, the celebration of Christmas in England was forbidden. The suppression was given greater legal weight from June 1647 when parliament passed an Ordinance for Abolishing of Festivals which formally abolished Christmas in its entirety, along with the other traditional church festivals of Easter and Whitsun.

It was in this context that Royalist pamphleteers linked the old traditions of Christmas with the cause of King and Church, while radical puritans argued for the suppression of Christmas both in its religious and its secular aspects. In the hands of Royalist pamphlet writers, Old Father Christmas served as the symbol and spokesman of 'the good old days' of feasting and good cheer, and it became popular for Christmastide's defenders to present him as lamenting past times.

The Arraignment, Conviction and Imprisoning of Christmas (January 1646) describes a discussion between a town crier and a Royalist gentlewoman enquiring after Old Father Christmas who 'is gone from hence'. Its anonymous author, a parliamentarian, presents Father Christmas in a negative light, concentrating on his allegedly popish attributes: "For age, this hoarie headed man was of great yeares, and as white as snow; he entred the Romish Kallender time out of mind; [he] is old ...; he was full and fat as any dumb Docter of them all. He looked under the consecrated Laune sleeves as big as Bul-beefe ... but, since the catholike liquor is taken from him, he is much wasted, so that he hath looked very thin and ill of late ... But yet some other markes that you may know him by, is that the wanton Women dote after him; he helped them to so many new Gownes, Hatts, and Hankerches, and other fine knacks, of which he hath a pack on his back, in which is good store of all sorts, besides the fine knacks that he got out of their husbands' pockets for household provisions for him. He got Prentises, Servants, and Schollars many play dayes, and therefore was well beloved by them also, and made all merry with Bagpipes, Fiddles, and other musicks, Giggs, Dances, and Mummings."

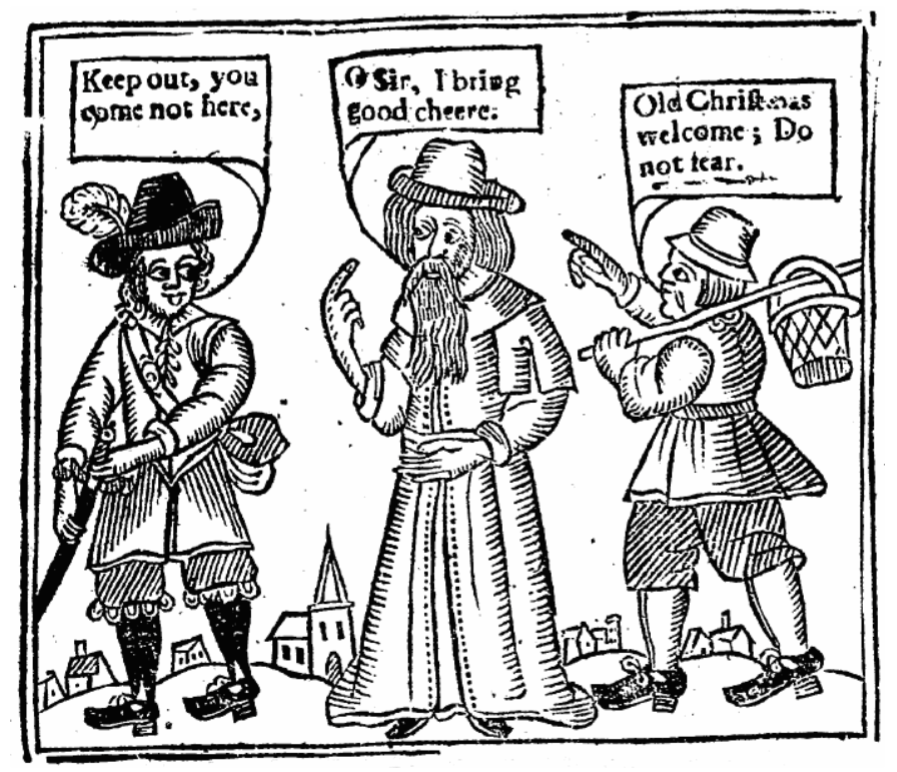
Father Christmas (centre) depicted in The Vindication of Christmas, 1652

The character of 'Christmas' (also called 'father Christmas') speaks in a pamphlet of 1652, immediately after the English Civil War, published anonymously by the satirical Royalist poet John Taylor: The Vindication of Christmas or, His Twelve Yeares' Observations upon the Times. A frontispiece illustrates an old, bearded Christmas in a brimmed hat, a long open robe and undersleeves. Christmas laments the pitiful quandary he has fallen into since he came into "this headlesse countrey". "I was in good hope that so long a misery would have made them glad to bid a merry Christmas welcome. But welcome or not welcome, I am come...." He concludes with a verse: "Lets dance and sing, and make good chear, / For Christmas comes but once a year."

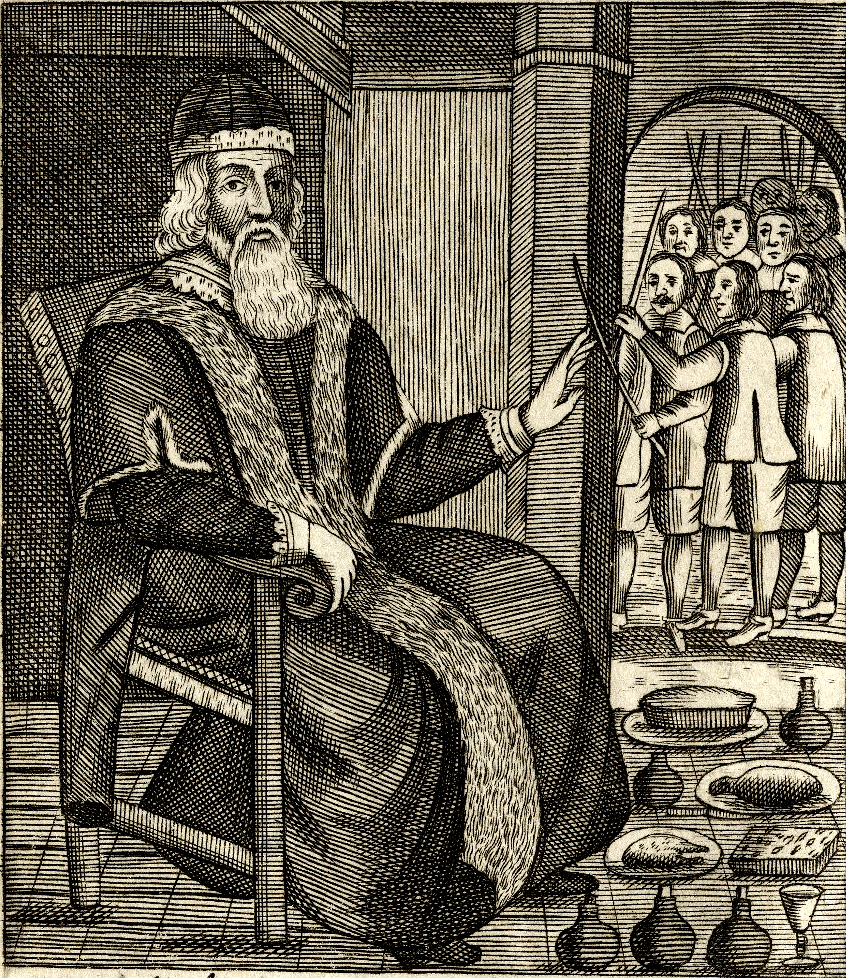
Father Christmas, as illustrated in Josiah King's two pamphlets of 1658 (The Examination and Tryall of Old Father Christmas) during the Puritan ban on Christmas, and 1678 when it has been restored as a holy day

In 1658 Josiah King published The Examination and Tryall of Old Father Christmas (the earliest citation for the specific term 'Father Christmas' recognised by the Oxford English Dictionary). King portrays Father Christmas as a white-haired old man who is on trial for his life based on evidence laid against him by the Commonwealth. Father Christmas's counsel mounts the defence: "Me thinks my Lord, the very Clouds blush, to see this old Gentleman thus egregiously abused. if at any time any have abused themselves by immoderate eating, and drinking or otherwise spoil the creatures, it is none of this old mans fault; neither ought he to suffer for it; for example the Sun and the Moon are by the heathens worship’d are they therefore bad because idolized? so if any abuse this old man, they are bad for abusing him, not he bad, for being abused." The jury acquits.

=== Restoration ===
Following the Restoration in 1660, most traditional Christmas celebrations were revived, although as these were no longer contentious the historic documentary sources become fewer.

In 1678 Josiah King reprinted his 1658 pamphlet with additional material. In this version, the restored Father Christmas is looking better: "[he] look't so smug and pleasant, his cherry cheeks appeared through his thin milk white locks, like [b]lushing Roses vail'd with snow white Tiffany ... the true Emblem of Joy and Innocence."

Old Christmass Returnd, a ballad collected by Samuel Pepys, celebrated the revival of festivities in the latter part of the century: "Old Christmass is come for to keep open house / He scorns to be guilty of starving a mouse, / Then come boyes and welcome, for dyet the chief / Plumb pudding, Goose, Capon, minc't pies & Roast beef".

== 18th century—a low profile ==
As interest in Christmas customs waned, Father Christmas's profile declined. He still continued to be regarded as Christmas's presiding spirit, although his occasional earlier associations with the Lord of Misrule died out with the disappearance of the Lord of Misrule himself. The historian Ronald Hutton notes that "after a taste of genuine misrule during the Interregnum nobody in the ruling elite seems to have had any stomach for simulating it." Hutton also found "patterns of entertainment at late Stuart Christmases are remarkably timeless [and] nothing very much seems to have altered during the next century either." The diaries of 18th and early 19th century clergy take little note of any Christmas traditions.

In The Country Squire, a play of 1732, Old Christmas is depicted as someone who is rarely-found: a generous squire. The character Scabbard remarks, "Men are grown so ... stingy, now-a-days, that there is scarce One, in ten Parishes, makes any House-keeping. ... Squire Christmas ... keeps a good House, or else I do not know of One besides." When invited to spend Christmas with the squire, he comments "I will ... else I shall forget Christmas, for aught I see." Similar opinions were expressed in Round About Our Coal Fire ... with some curious Memories of Old Father Christmas; Shewing what Hospitality was in former Times, and how little there remains of it at present (1734, reprinted with Father Christmas subtitle 1796).

David Garrick's popular 1774 Drury Lane production of A Christmas Tale included a personified Christmas character who announced "Behold a personage well known to fame; / Once lov'd and honour'd – Christmas is my name! /.../ I, English hearts rejoic'd in days of yore; / for new strange modes, imported by the score, / You will not sure turn Christmas out of door!"

=== Early records of folk plays ===
By the late 18th century Father Christmas had become a stock character in the Christmas folk plays later known as mummers plays. During the following century they became probably the most widespread of all calendar customs. Hundreds of villages had their own mummers who performed traditional plays around the neighbourhood, especially at the big houses. Father Christmas appears as a character in plays of the Southern England type, being mostly confined to plays from the south and west of England and Wales. His ritual opening speech is characterised by variants of a couplet closely reminiscent of John Taylor's "But welcome or not welcome, I am come..." from 1652.

The oldest extant speech is from Truro, Cornwall in the late 1780s:

hare comes i ould father Christmas welcom or welcom not i hope ould father Christmas will never be forgot ould father Christmas a pair but woance a yare he lucks like an ould man of 4 score yare	Here comes I, old Father Christmas, welcome or welcome not, I hope old Father Christmas will never be forgot. Old Father Christmas appear[s] but once a year, He looks like an old man of fourscore year [80].

== 19th century—revival ==
During the Victorian period, Christmas customs enjoyed a significant revival, including the figure of Father Christmas himself as the emblem of 'good cheer'. His physical appearance at this time became more variable, and he was by no means always portrayed as the old and bearded figure imagined by 17th century writers.

=== 'Merry England' view of Christmas ===
In his 1808 poem Marmion, Walter Scott wrote:

England was merry England, when / Old Christmas brought his sports again.
'Twas Christmas broach'd the mightiest ale; / 'Twas Christmas told the merriest tale;
A Christmas gambol oft could cheer / The poor man's heart through half the year.

Scott's phrase Merry England has been adopted by historians to describe the romantic notion that there was a Golden Age of the English past, allegedly since lost, that was characterised by universal hospitality and charity. The notion had a profound influence on the way that popular customs were seen, and most of the 19th century writers who bemoaned the state of contemporary Christmases were, at least to some extent, yearning for the mythical Merry England version.

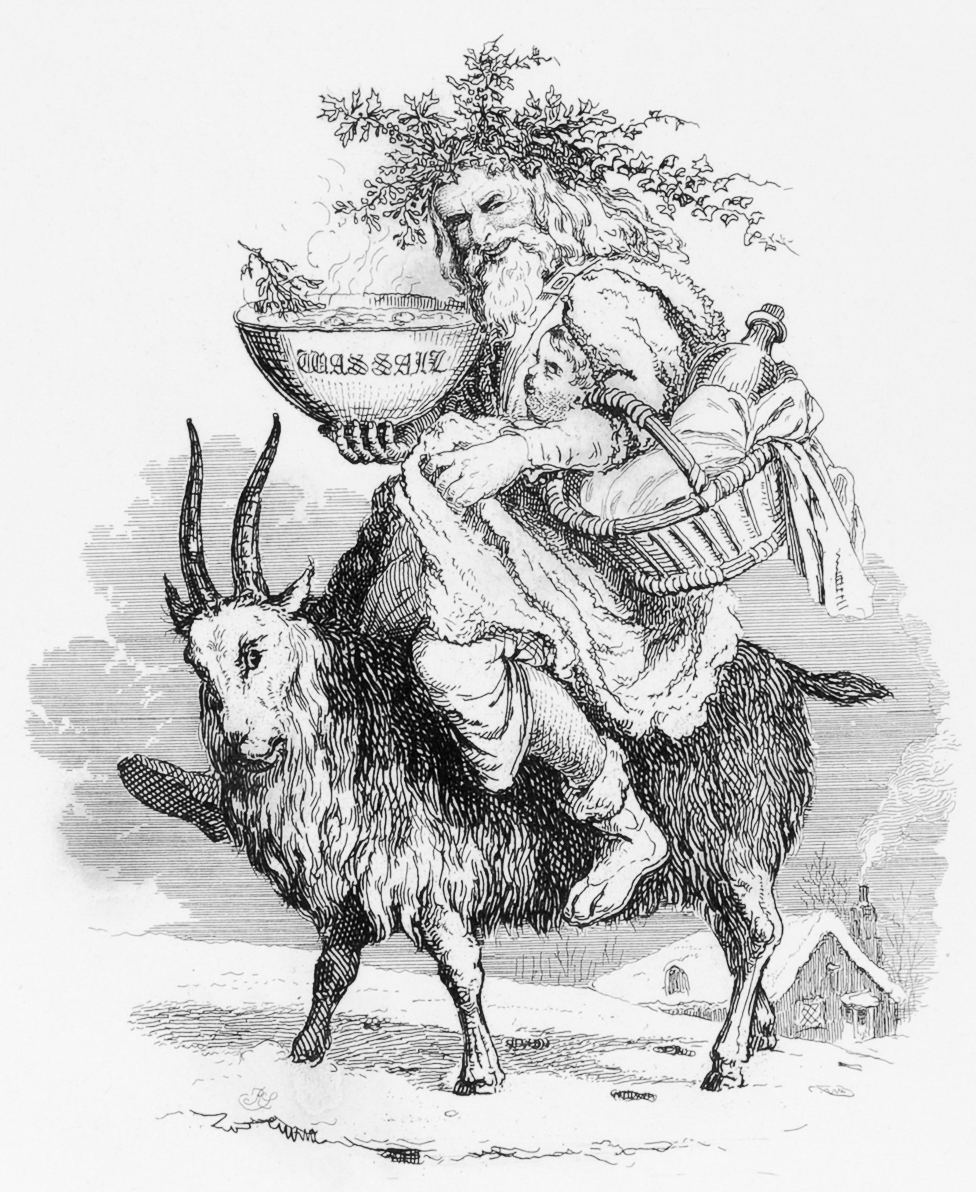
A Merry England vision of Old Christmas 1836

Thomas Hervey's The Book of Christmas (1836), illustrated by Robert Seymour, exemplifies this view. In Hervey's personification of the lost charitable festival, "Old Father Christmas, at the head of his numerous and uproarious family, might ride his goat through the streets of the city and the lanes of the village, but he dismounted to sit for some few moments by each man's hearth; while some one or another of his merry sons would break away, to visit the remote farm-houses or show their laughing faces at many a poor man's door." Seymour's illustration shows Old Christmas dressed in a fur gown, crowned with a holly wreath, and riding a yule goat.

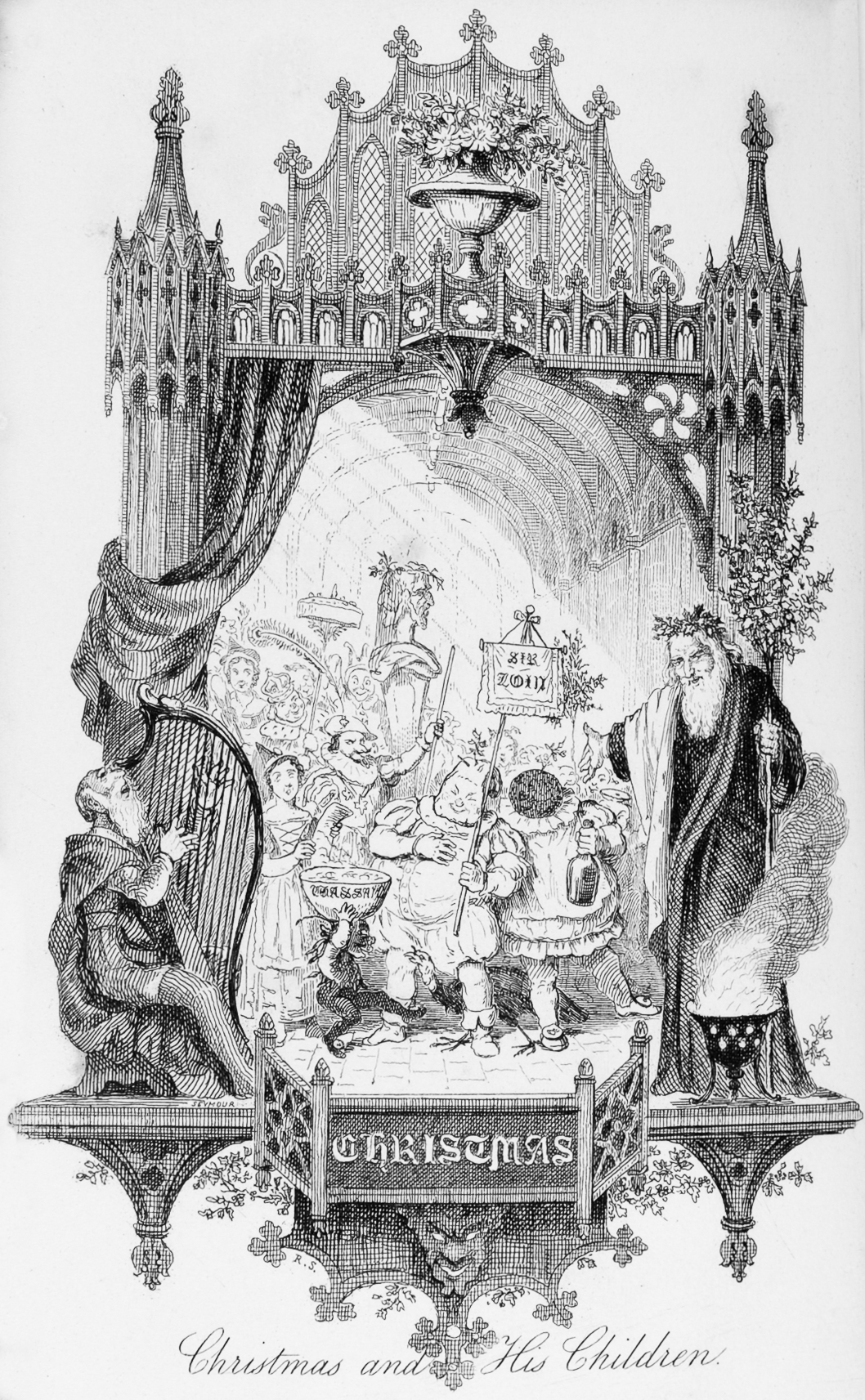
Christmas with his children 1836

In an extended allegory, Hervey imagines his contemporary Old Father Christmas as a white-bearded magician dressed in a long robe and crowned with holly. His children are identified as Roast Beef (Sir Loin) and his faithful squire or bottle-holder Plum Pudding; the slender figure of Wassail with her fount of perpetual youth; a 'tricksy spirit' who bears the bowl and is on the best of terms with the Turkey; Mumming; Misrule, with a feather in his cap; the Lord of Twelfth Night under a state-canopy of cake and wearing his ancient crown; Saint Distaff looking like an old maid ("she used to be a sad romp; but her merriest days we fear are over"); Carol singing; the Waits; and the twin-faced Janus.

Hervey ends by lamenting the lost "uproarious merriment" of Christmas, and calls on his readers "who know anything of the 'old, old, very old, gray-bearded gentleman' or his family to aid us in our search after them; and with their good help we will endeavor to restore them to some portion of their ancient honors in England".

Father Christmas or Old Christmas, represented as a jolly-faced bearded man often surrounded by plentiful food and drink, started to appear regularly in illustrated magazines of the 1840s. He was dressed in a variety of costumes and usually had holly on his head, as in these illustrations from the Illustrated London News:

Illustrated London News, 1840s

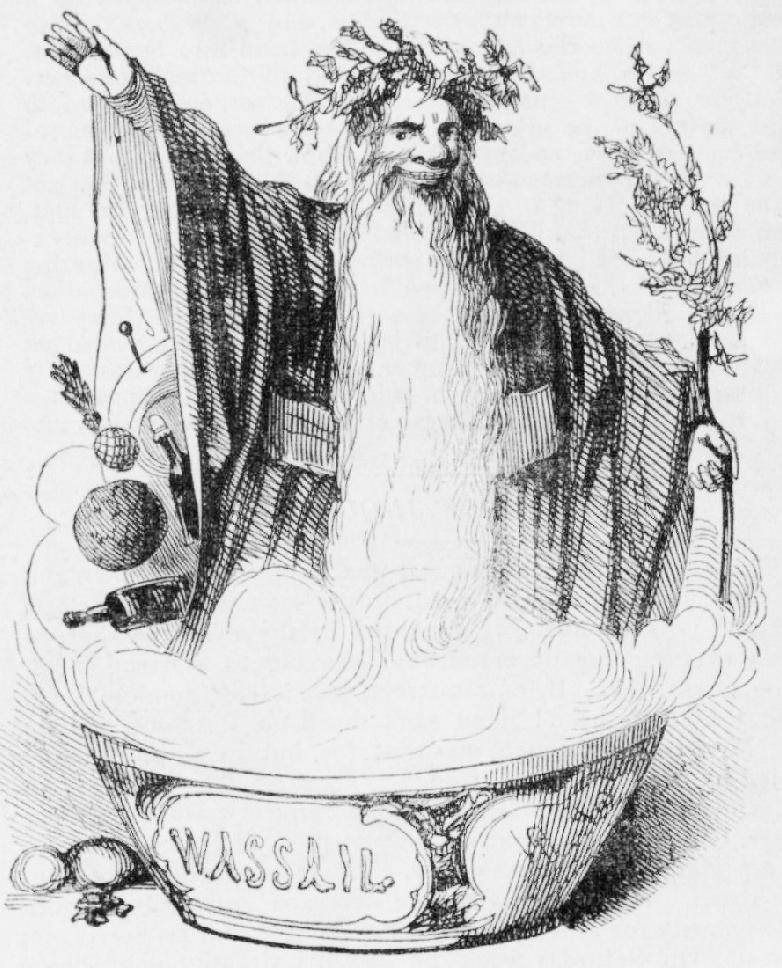
Old Christmas 1842

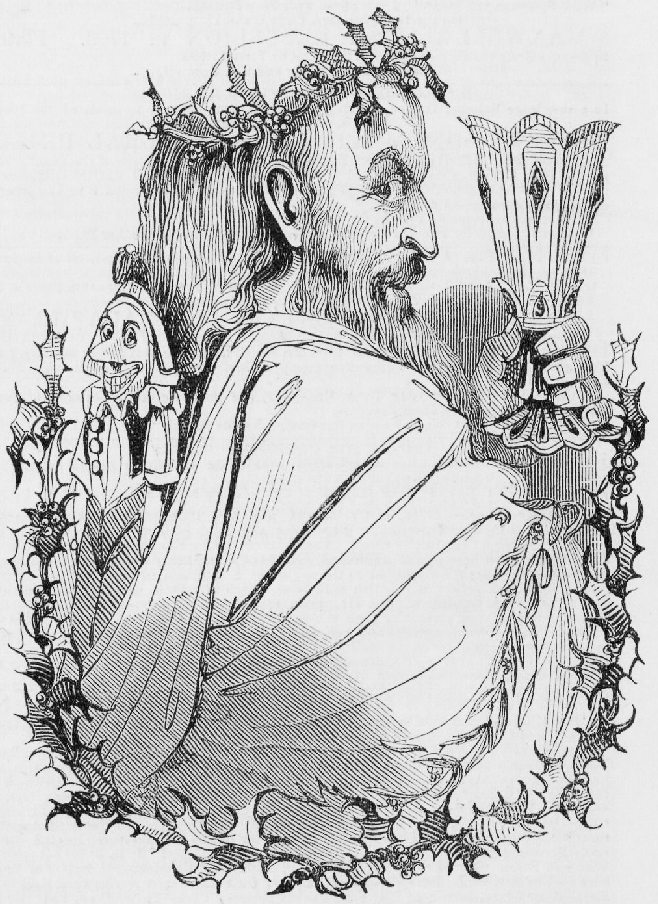
Old Christmas / Father Christmas 1843

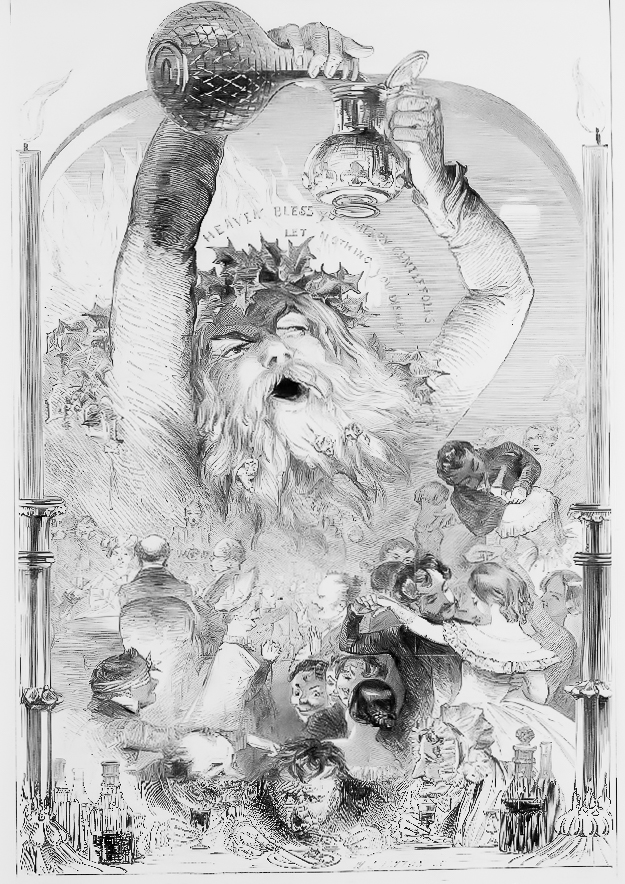
Old Christmas 1847

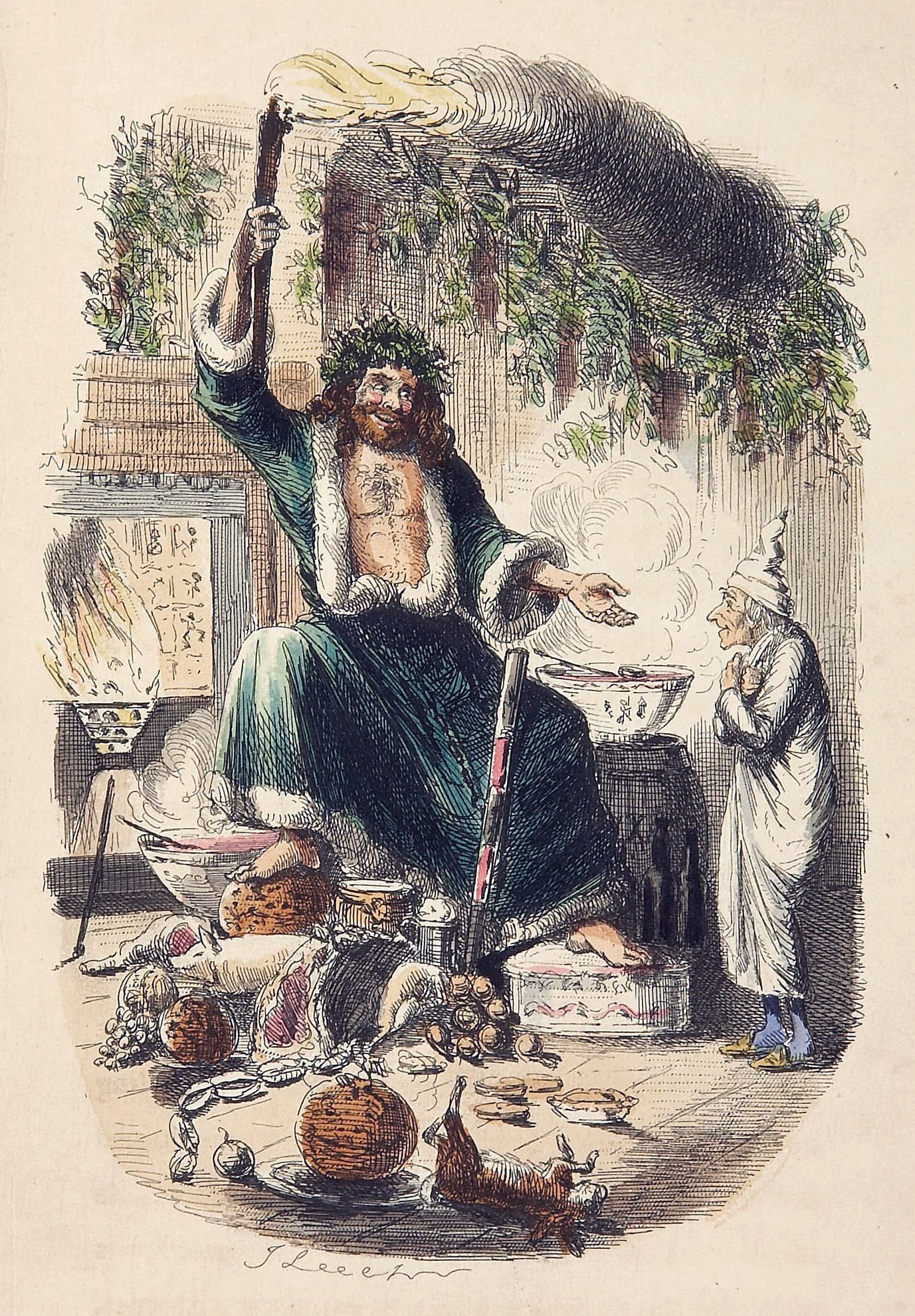
'Ghost of Christmas Present' in Charles Dickens's A Christmas Carol 1843.

Charles Dickens's 1843 novel A Christmas Carol was highly influential, and has been credited both with reviving interest in Christmas in England and with shaping the themes attached to it. A famous image from the novel is John Leech's illustration of the 'Ghost of Christmas Present'. Although not explicitly named Father Christmas, the character wears a holly wreath, is shown sitting among food, drink and wassail bowl, and is dressed in the traditional loose furred gown—but in green rather than the red that later become ubiquitous.

=== Later 19th century mumming ===
Old Father Christmas continued to make his annual appearance in Christmas folk plays throughout the 19th century, his appearance varying considerably according to local custom. Sometimes, as in Hervey's book of 1836, he was portrayed (below left) as a hunchback.

One unusual portrayal (below centre) was described several times by William Sandys between 1830 and 1852, all in essentially the same terms: "Father Christmas is represented as a grotesque old man, with a large mask and comic wig, and a huge club in his hand." This representation is considered by the folklore scholar Peter Millington to be the result of the southern Father Christmas replacing the northern Beelzebub character in a hybrid play. A spectator to a Worcestershire version of the St George play in 1856 noted that "Beelzebub was identical with Old Father Christmas."

A mummers play mentioned in The Book of Days (1864) opened with "Old Father Christmas, bearing, as emblematic devices, the holly bough, wassail-bowl, &c". A corresponding illustration (below right) shows the character wearing not only a holly wreath but also a gown with a hood.

Old Father Christmas in folk plays

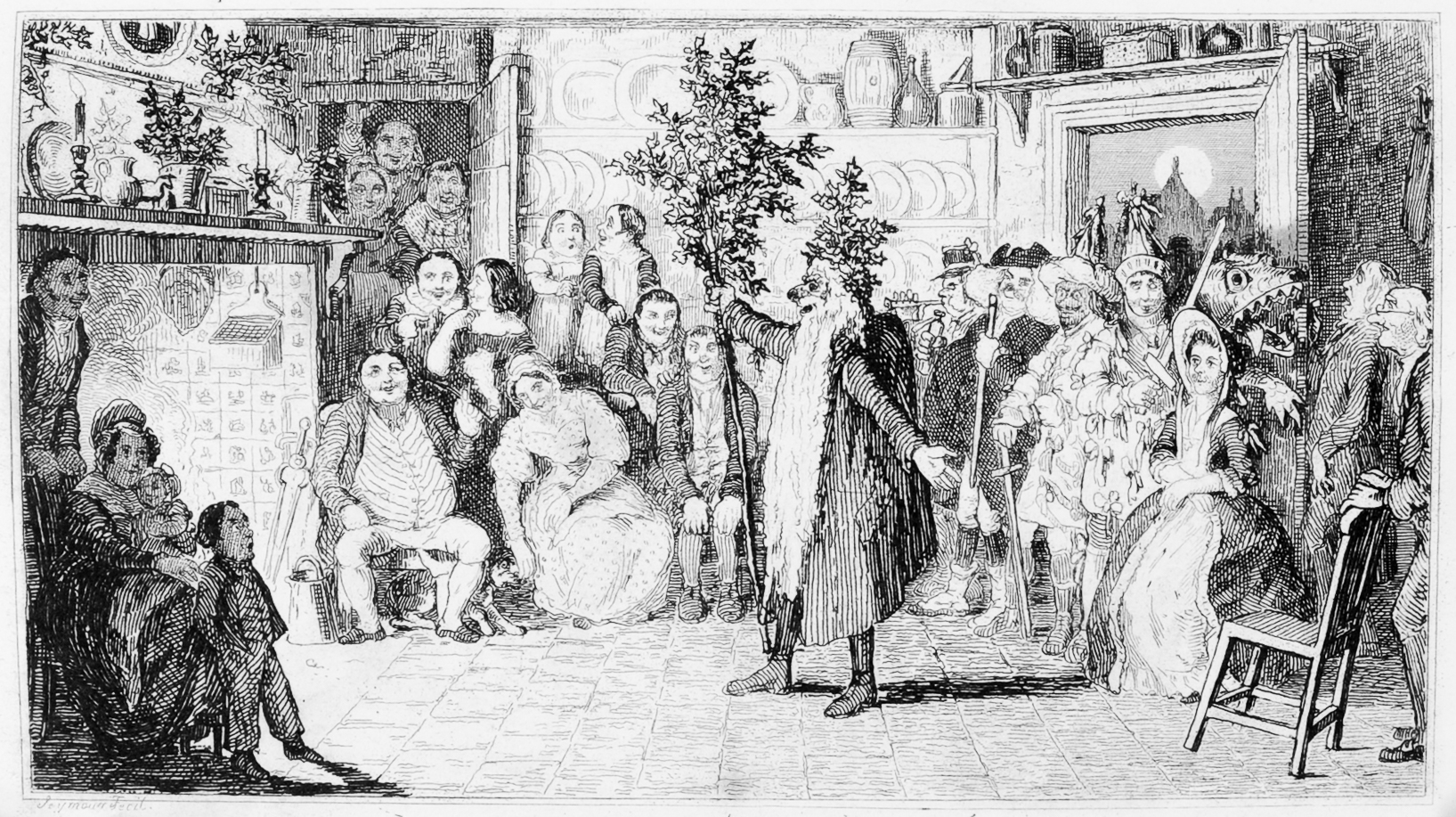
A hunchback Old Father Christmas in an 1836 play with long robe, holly wreath and staff.

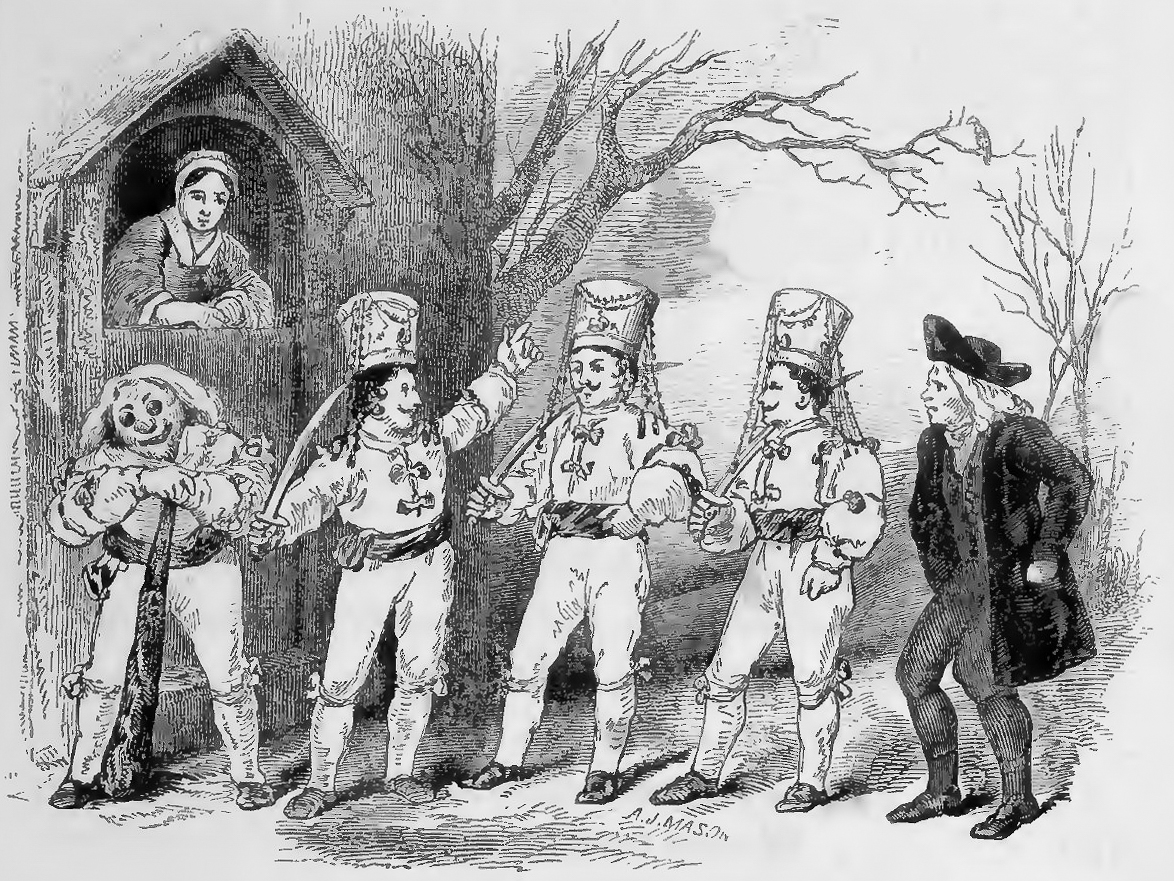
An 1852 play. The Old Father Christmas character is on the far left.

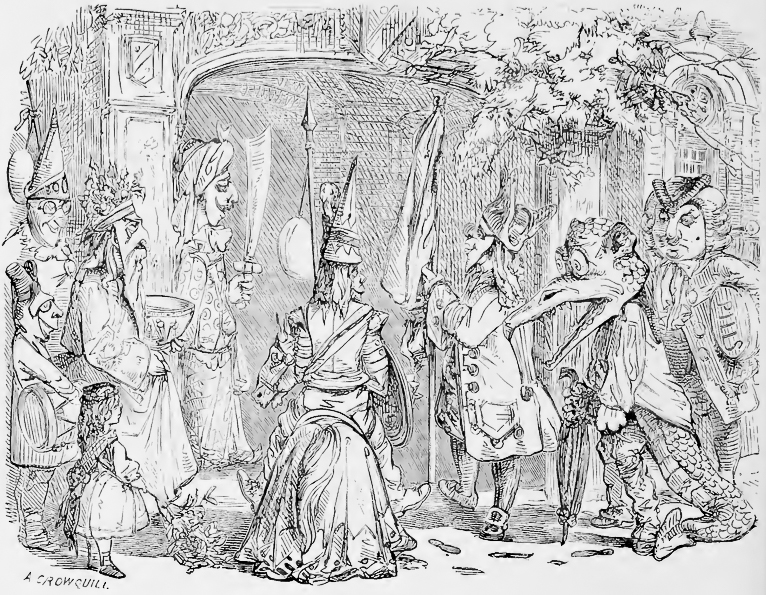
A party of mummers 1864

In a Hampshire folk play of 1860 Father Christmas is portrayed as a disabled soldier: "[he] wore breeches and stockings, carried a begging-box, and conveyed himself upon two sticks; his arms were striped with chevrons like a noncommissioned officer."

In the latter part of the 19th century and the early years of the next the folk play tradition in England rapidly faded, and the plays almost died out after the First World War taking their ability to influence the character of Father Christmas with them.

=== Father Christmas as gift-giver ===
In pre-Victorian personifications, Father Christmas had been concerned essentially with adult feasting and games. He had no particular connection with children, nor with the giving of presents. But as Victorian Christmases developed into family festivals centred mainly on children, Father Christmas started to be associated with the giving of gifts.

The Cornish Quaker diarist Barclay Fox relates a family party given on 26 December 1842 that featured "the venerable effigies of Father Christmas with scarlet coat & cocked hat, stuck all over with presents for the guests, by his side the old year, a most dismal & haggard old beldame in a night cap and spectacles, then 1843 [the new year], a promising baby asleep in a cradle".

In Britain, the first evidence of a child writing letters to Father Christmas requesting gift has been found in 1895.

=== Santa Claus crosses the Atlantic ===
The figure of Santa Claus had originated in the US, drawing at least partly upon Dutch St Nicolas traditions. A New York publication of 1821, A New-Year’s Present, contained an illustrated poem Old Santeclaus with Much Delight in which a Santa Claus figure on a reindeer sleigh brings presents for good children and a "long, black birchen rod" for use on the bad ones. In 1823 came the famous poem A Visit from St. Nicholas, usually attributed to the New York writer Clement Clarke Moore, which developed the character further. Moore's poem became immensely popular and Santa Claus customs, initially localised in the Dutch American areas, were becoming general in the United States by the middle of the century.

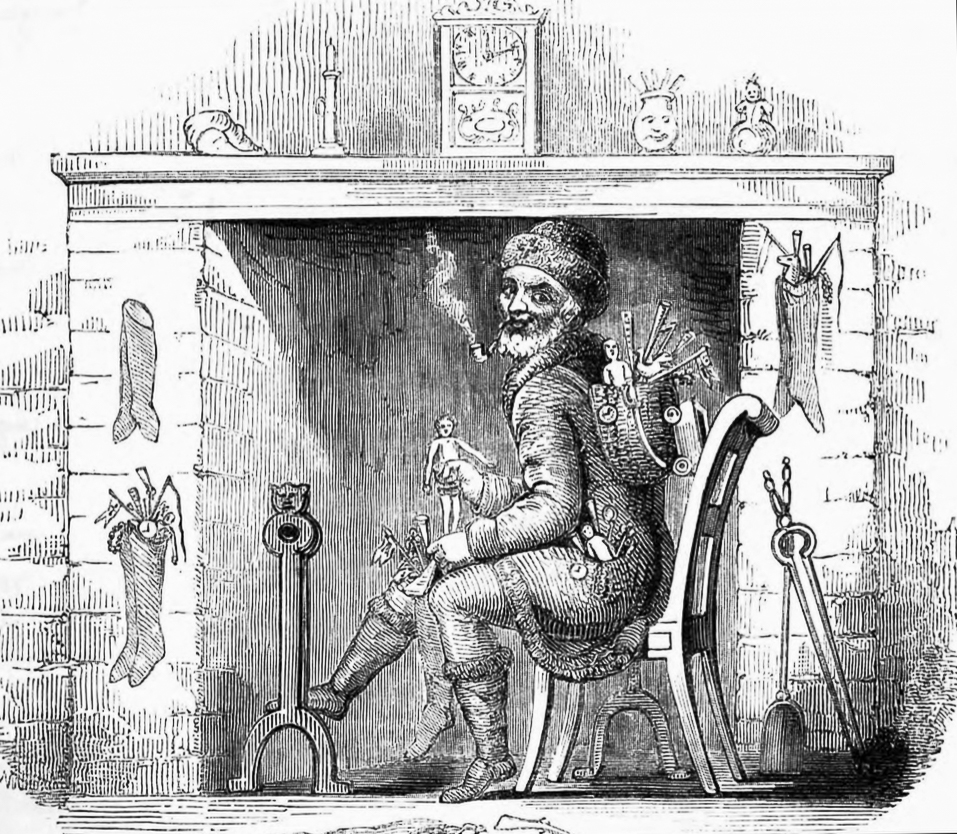
Santa Claus, as presented in Howitt's Journal of Literature and Popular Progress, London 1848

The January 1848 edition of Howitt's Journal of Literature and Popular Progress, published in London, carried an illustrated article entitled "New Year's Eve in Different Nations". This noted that one of the chief features of the American New Year's Eve was a custom carried over from the Dutch, namely the arrival of Santa Claus with gifts for the children. Santa Claus is "no other than the Pelz Nickel of Germany ... the good Saint Nicholas of Russia ... He arrives in Germany about a fortnight before Christmas, but as may be supposed from all the visits he has to pay there, and the length of his voyage, he does not arrive in America, until this eve."

In 1851 advertisements began appearing in Liverpool newspapers for a new transatlantic passenger service to and from New York aboard the Eagle Line's ship Santa Claus, and returning visitors and emigrants to the British Isles on this and other vessels will have been familiar with the American figure. There were some early adoptions in Britain. A Scottish reference has Santa Claus leaving presents on New Year's Eve 1852, with children "hanging their stockings up on each side of the fire-place, in their sleeping apartments, at night, and waiting patiently till morning, to see what Santa Claus puts into them during their slumbers". In Ireland in 1853, on the other hand, presents were being left on Christmas Eve according to a character in a newspaper short story who says "... tomorrow will be Christmas. What will Santa Claus bring us?" A poem published in Belfast in 1858 includes the lines "The children sleep; they dream of him, the fairy, / Kind Santa Claus, who with a right good will / Comes down the chimney with a footstep airy ..."

A Visit from St. Nicholas was published in England in December 1853 in Notes and Queries. An explanatory note states that the St Nicholas figure is known as Santa Claus in New York State and as Krishkinkle in Pennsylvania.

1854 marked the first English publication of Carl Krinkin; or, The Christmas Stocking by the popular American author Susan Warner. The novel was published three times in London in 1854–5, and there were several later editions. Characters in the book include both Santa Claus (complete with sleigh, stocking and chimney), leaving presents on Christmas Eve and—separately—Old Father Christmas. The Stocking of the title tells of how in England, "a great many years ago", it saw Father Christmas enter with his traditional refrain "Oh! here come I, old father Christmas, welcome or not ..." He wore a crown of yew and ivy, and he carried a long staff topped with holly-berries. His dress "was a long brown robe which fell down about his feet, and on it were sewed little spots of white cloth to represent snow".

=== Merger with Santa Claus ===
As the US-inspired customs became popular in England, Father Christmas started to take on Santa Claus's attributes. His costume became more standardised, and although depictions often still showed him carrying holly, the holly crown became rarer and was often replaced with a hood. It still remained common, though, for Father Christmas and Santa Claus to be distinguished, and as late as the 1890s there were still examples of the old-style Father Christmas appearing without any of the new American features.

==== Appearances in public ====
The blurring of public roles occurred quite rapidly. In an 1854 newspaper description of the public Boxing Day festivities in Luton, Bedfordshire, a gift-giving Father Christmas/Santa Claus figure was already being described as 'familiar': "On the right-hand side was Father Christmas's bower, formed of evergreens, and in front was the proverbial Yule log, glistening in the snow ... He wore a great furry white coat and cap, and a long white beard and hair spoke to his hoar antiquity. Behind his bower he had a large selection of fancy articles which formed the gifts he distributed to holders of prize tickets from time to time during the day ... Father Christmas bore in his hand a small Christmas tree laden with bright little gifts and bon-bons, and altogether he looked like the familiar Santa Claus or Father Christmas of the picture book." Discussing the shops of Regent Street in London, another writer noted in December of that year that "you may fancy yourself in the abode of Father Christmas or St. Nicholas himself."

During the 1860s and the 1870s, Father Christmas became a popular subject on Christmas cards, where he was shown in many different costumes. Sometimes he gave presents and sometimes received them.

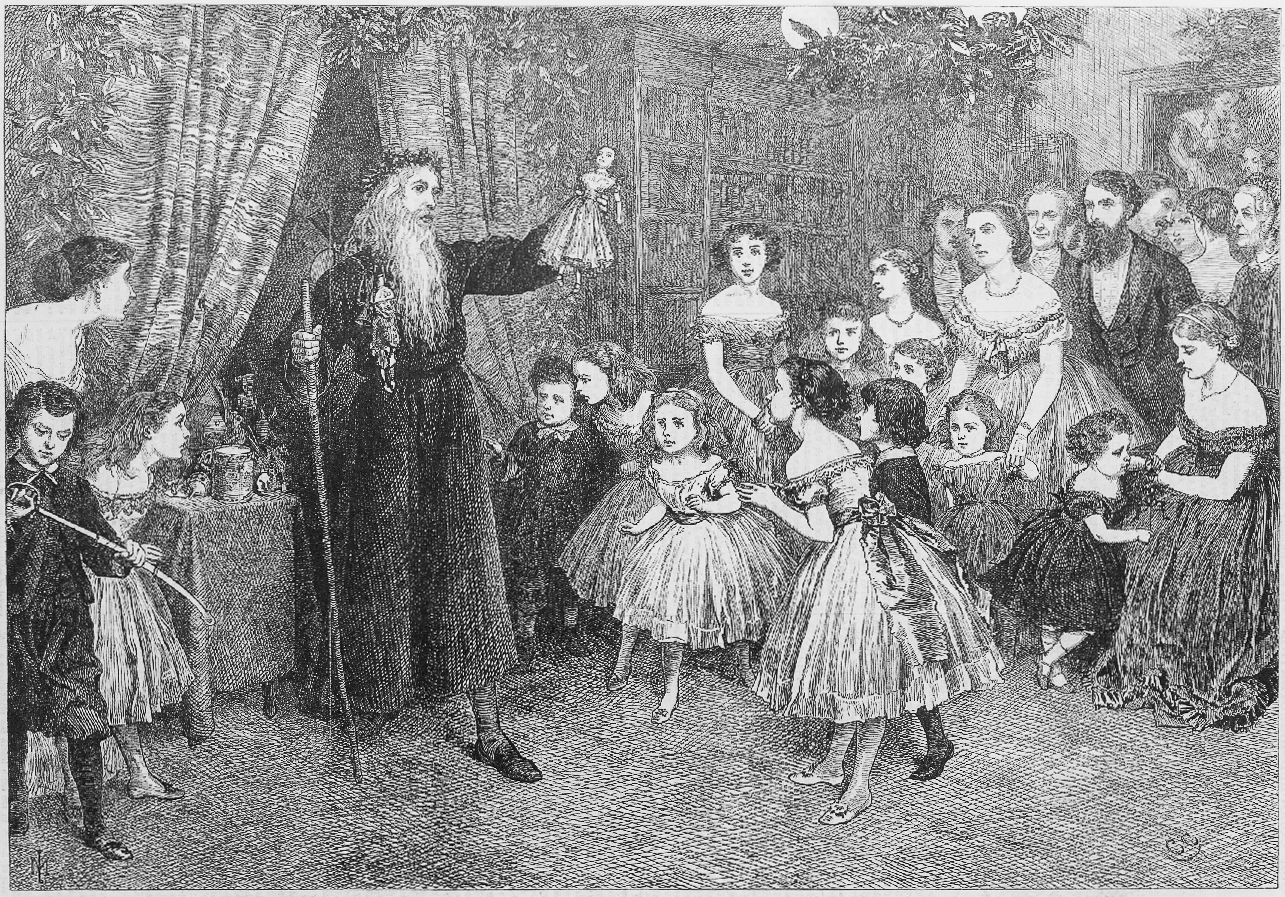
Old Father Christmas, or The Cave of Mystery 1866

An illustrated article of 1866 explained the concept of The Cave of Mystery. In an imagined children's party this took the form of a recess in the library which evoked "dim visions of the cave of Aladdin" and was "well filled ... with all that delights the eye, pleases the ear, or tickles the fancy of children". The young guests "tremblingly await the decision of the improvised Father Christmas, with his flowing grey beard, long robe, and slender staff".

Father Christmas 1879, with holly crown and wassail bowl, the bowl now being used for the delivery of children's presents

From the 1870s onwards, Christmas shopping had begun to evolve as a separate seasonal activity, and by the late 19th century it had become an important part of the English Christmas. The purchasing of toys, especially from the new department stores, became strongly associated with the season. The first retail Christmas Grotto was set up in JR Robert's store in Stratford, London in December 1888, and shopping arenas for children—often called 'Christmas Bazaars'—spread rapidly during the 1890s and 1900s, helping to assimilate Father Christmas/Santa Claus into society.

Sometimes the two characters continued to be presented as separate, as in a procession at the Olympia Exhibition of 1888 in which both Father Christmas and Santa Claus took part, with Little Red Riding Hood and other children's characters in between. At other times the characters were conflated: in 1885 Mr Williamson's London Bazaar in Sunderland was reported to be a "Temple of juvenile delectation and delight. In the well-lighted window is a representation of Father Christmas, with the printed intimation that 'Santa Claus is arranging within.'"

Domestic Theatricals 1881

Even after the appearance of the store grotto, it was still not firmly established who should hand out gifts at parties. A writer in the Illustrated London News of December 1888 suggested that a Sibyl should dispense gifts from a 'snow cave', but a little over a year later she had changed her recommendation to a gypsy in a 'magic cave'. Alternatively, the hostess could "have Father Christmas arrive, towards the end of the evening, with a sack of toys on his back. He must have a white head and a long white beard, of course. Wig and beard can be cheaply hired from a theatrical costumier, or may be improvised from tow in case of need. He should wear a greatcoat down to his heels, liberally sprinkled with flour as though he had just come from that land of ice where Father Christmas is supposed to reside."

==== As secret nocturnal visitor ====
The nocturnal visitor aspect of the American myth took much longer to become naturalised. From the 1840s it had been accepted readily enough that presents were left for children by unseen hands overnight on Christmas Eve, but the receptacle was a matter of debate, as was the nature of the visitor. Dutch tradition had St Nicholas leaving presents in shoes laid out on 5 December, while in France shoes were filled by Père Noël. The older shoe custom and the newer American stocking custom trickled only slowly into Britain, with writers and illustrators remaining uncertain for many years. Although the stocking eventually triumphed, the shoe custom had still not been forgotten by 1901 when an illustration entitled Did you see Santa Claus, Mother? was accompanied by the verse "Her Christmas dreams / Have all come true; / Stocking o'erflows / and likewise shoe."

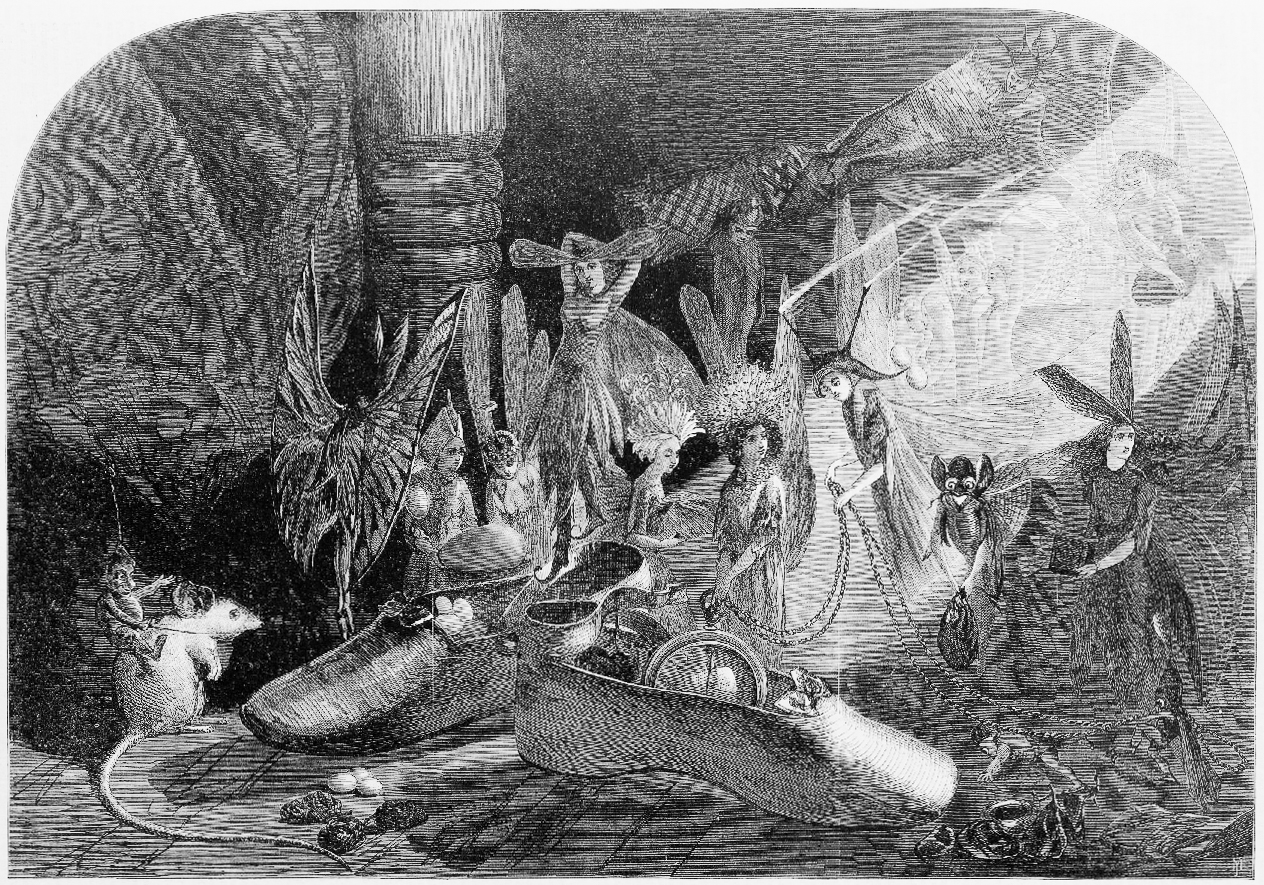
Fairy Gifts by JA Fitzgerald showing nocturnal visitors in 1868, before the American Santa Claus tradition took hold.

Before Santa Claus and the stocking became ubiquitous, one English tradition had been for fairies to visit on Christmas Eve to leave gifts in shoes set out in front of the fireplace.

Aspects of the American Santa Claus myth were sometimes adopted in isolation and applied to Father Christmas. In a short fantasy piece, the editor of the Cheltenham Chronicle in 1867 dreamt of being seized by the collar by Father Christmas, "rising up like a Geni of the Arabian Nights ... and moving rapidly through the aether". Hovering over the roof of a house, Father Christmas cries 'Open Sesame' to have the roof roll back to disclose the scene within.

It was not until the 1870s that the tradition of a nocturnal Santa Claus began to be adopted by ordinary people. The poem The Baby's Stocking, which was syndicated to local newspapers in 1871, took it for granted that readers would be familiar with the custom, and would understand the joke that the stocking might be missed as "Santa Claus wouldn't be looking for anything half so small." On the other hand, when The Preston Guardian published its poem Santa Claus and the Children in 1877 it felt the need to include a long preface explaining exactly who Santa Claus was.

Folklorists and antiquarians were not, it seems, familiar with the new local customs and Ronald Hutton notes that in 1879 the newly formed Folk-Lore Society, ignorant of American practices, was still "excitedly trying to discover the source of the new belief".

In January 1879 the antiquarian Edwin Lees wrote to Notes and Queries seeking information about an observance he had been told about by 'a country person': "On Christmas Eve, when the inmates of a house in the country retire to bed, all those desirous of a present place a stocking outside the door of their bedroom, with the expectation that some mythical being called Santiclaus will fill the stocking or place something within it before the morning. This is of course well known, and the master of the house does in reality place a Christmas gift secretly in each stocking; but the giggling girls in the morning, when bringing down their presents, affect to say that Santiclaus visited and filled the stockings in the night. From what region of the earth or air this benevolent Santiclaus takes flight I have not been able to ascertain ..." Lees received several responses, linking 'Santiclaus' with the continental traditions of St Nicholas and 'Petit Jesus' (Christkind), but no-one mentioned Father Christmas and no-one was correctly able to identify the American source.

By the 1880s the American myth had become firmly established in the popular English imagination, the nocturnal visitor sometimes being known as Santa Claus and sometimes as Father Christmas (often complete with a hooded robe). An 1881 poem imagined a child awaiting a visit from Santa Claus and asking "Will he come like Father Christmas, / Robed in green and beard all white? / Will he come amid the darkness? / Will he come at all tonight?" The French writer Max O'Rell, who evidently thought the custom was established in the England of 1883, explained that Father Christmas "descend par la cheminée, pour remplir de bonbons et de joux les bas que les enfants ont suspendus au pied du lit." [comes down the chimney, to fill with sweets and games the stockings that the children have hung from the foot of the bed]. And in her poem Agnes: A Fairy Tale (1891), Lilian M Bennett treats the two names as interchangeable: "Old Santa Claus is exceedingly kind, / but he won't come to Wide-awakes, you will find... / Father Christmas won't come if he can hear / You're awake. So to bed my bairnies dear." The commercial availability from 1895 of Tom Smith & Co's Santa Claus Surprise Stockings indicates how deeply the American myth had penetrated English society by the end of the century.

Representations of the developing character at this period were sometimes labelled 'Santa Claus' and sometimes 'Father Christmas', with a tendency for the latter still to allude to old-style associations with charity and with food and drink, as in several of these Punch illustrations:

Father Christmas in Punch, 1890s

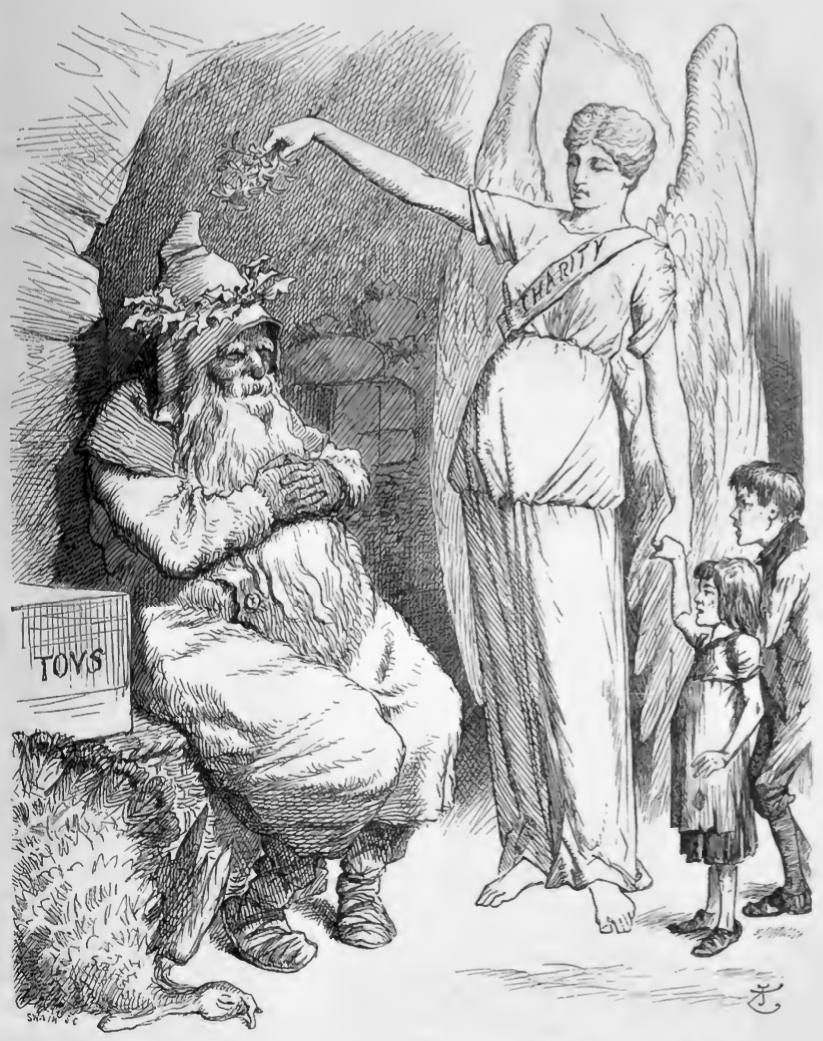
The Awakening of Father Christmas 1891

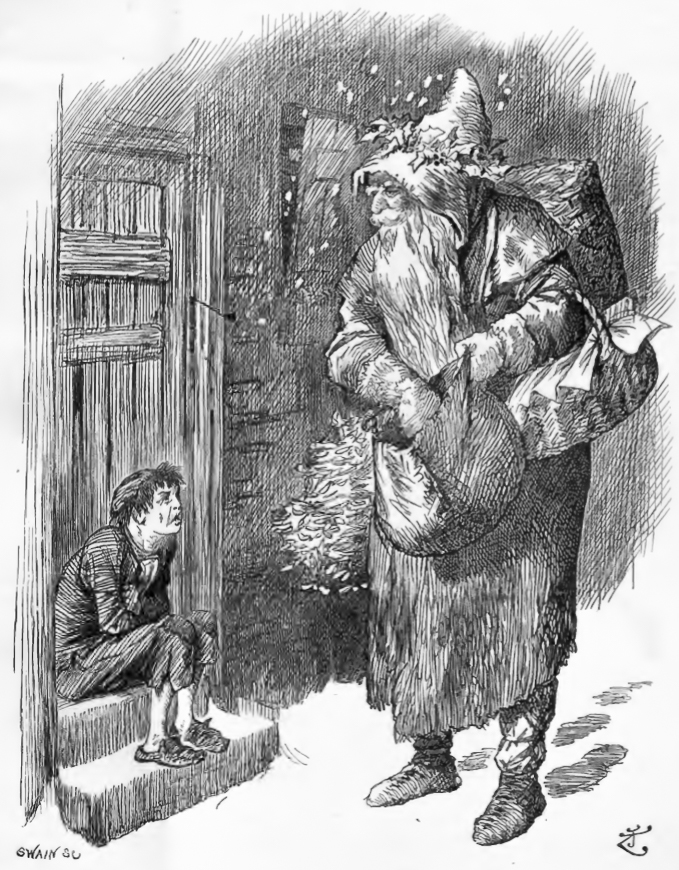
"Where's your stocking?" 1895

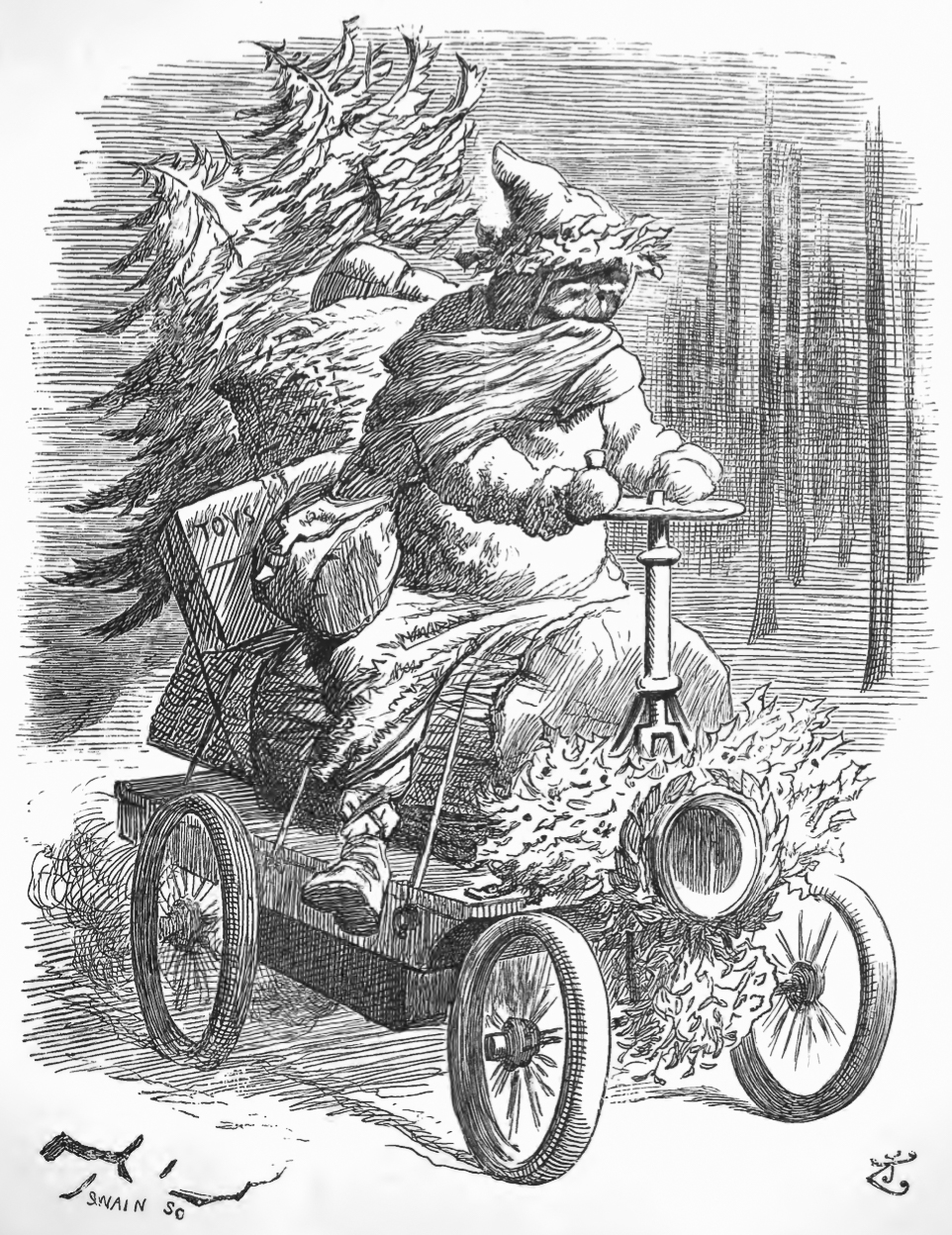
Father Christmas Up-To-Date 1896

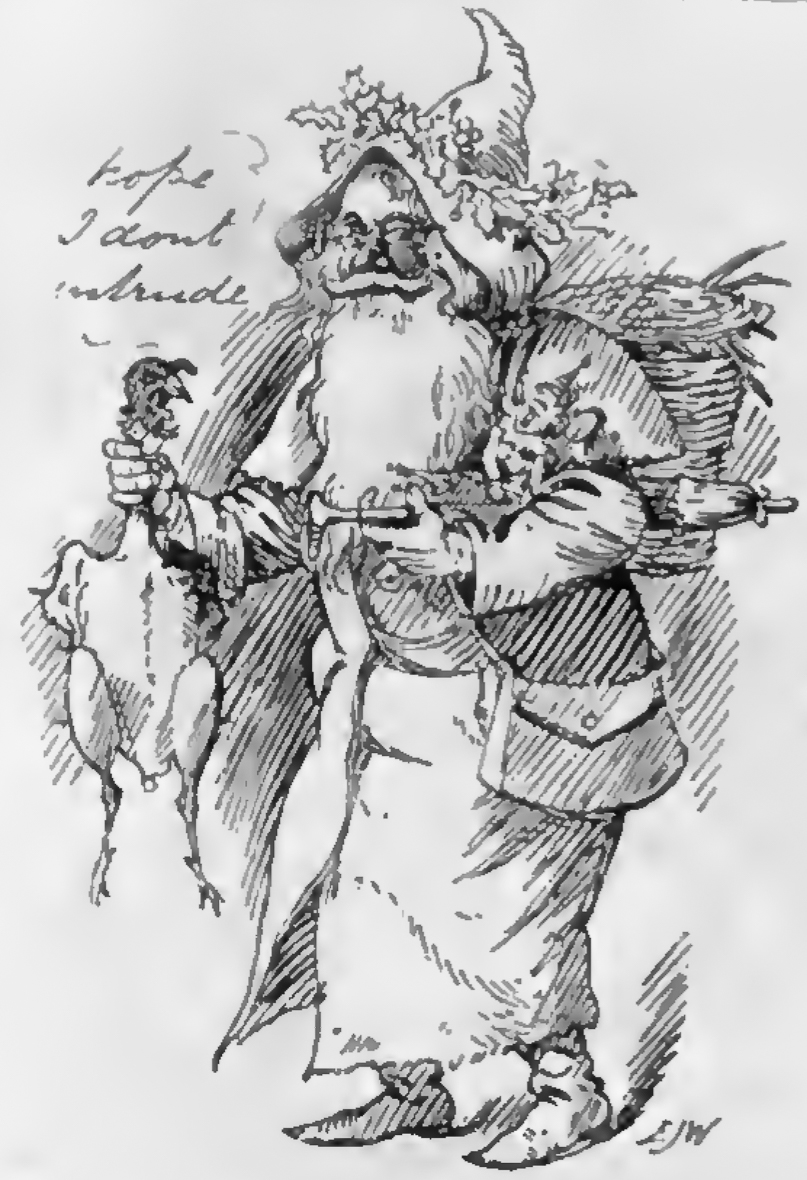
Father Christmas Not Up-To-Date 1897

== 20th century ==
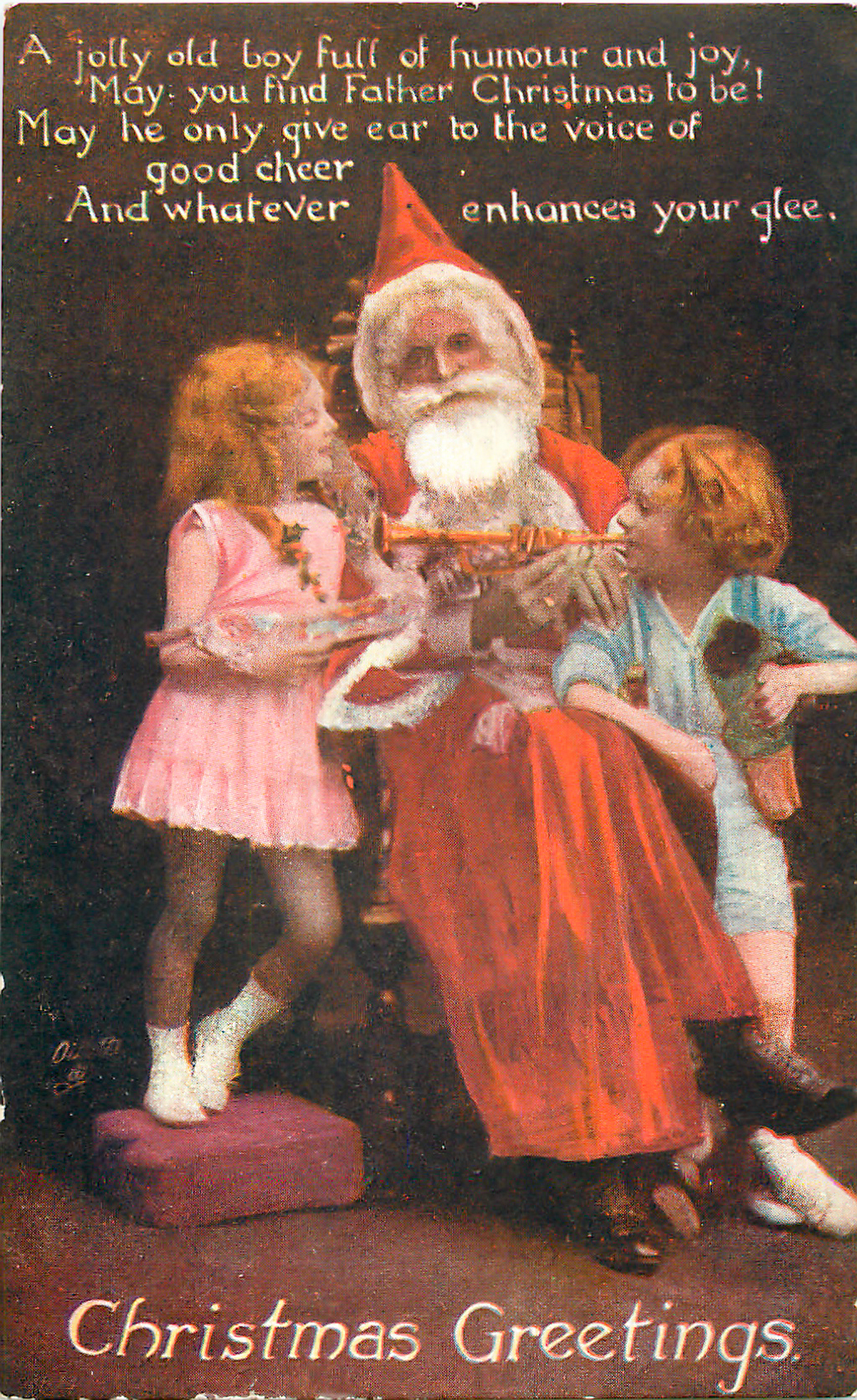
An English postcard of 1919 epitomises the OED's definition of Father Christmas as "a personification of Christmas, now conventionally pictured as a benevolent old man with a long white beard and red clothes trimmed with white fur, who brings presents for children on the night before Christmas Day".

Any residual distinctions between Father Christmas and Santa Claus largely faded away in the early years of the new century, and it was reported in 1915, "The majority of children to-day ... do not know of any difference between our old Father Christmas and the comparatively new Santa Claus, as, by both wearing the same garb, they have effected a happy compromise."

It took many years for authors and illustrators to agree that Father Christmas's costume should be portrayed as red—although that was always the most common colour—and he could sometimes be found in a gown of brown, green, blue or white. Mass media approval of the red costume came following a Coca-Cola advertising campaign that was launched in 1931.

Father Christmas cartoon, Punch, Dec 1919

Father Christmas's common form for much of the 20th century was described by his entry in the Oxford English Dictionary. He is "the personification of Christmas as a benevolent old man with a flowing white beard, wearing a red sleeved gown and hood trimmed with white fur, and carrying a sack of Christmas presents". One of the OED's sources is a 1919 cartoon in Punch, reproduced here. The caption reads:

Uncle James (who after hours of making up rather fancies himself as Father Christmas). "Well, my little man, and do you know who I am?"
The Little Man. "No, as a matter of fact I don't. But Father's downstairs; perhaps he may be able to tell you."

In 1951 an editorial in The Times opined that while most adults may be under the impression that [the English] Father Christmas is home-bred, and is "a good insular John Bull old gentleman", many children, "led away ... by the false romanticism of sledges and reindeer", post letters to Norway addressed simply to Father Christmas or, "giving him a foreign veneer, Santa Claus".

Differences between the English and US representations were discussed in The Illustrated London News of 1985. The classic illustration by the US artist Thomas Nast was held to be "the authorised version of how Santa Claus should look—in America, that is." In Britain, people were said to stick to the older Father Christmas, with a long robe, large concealing beard, and boots similar to Wellingtons.

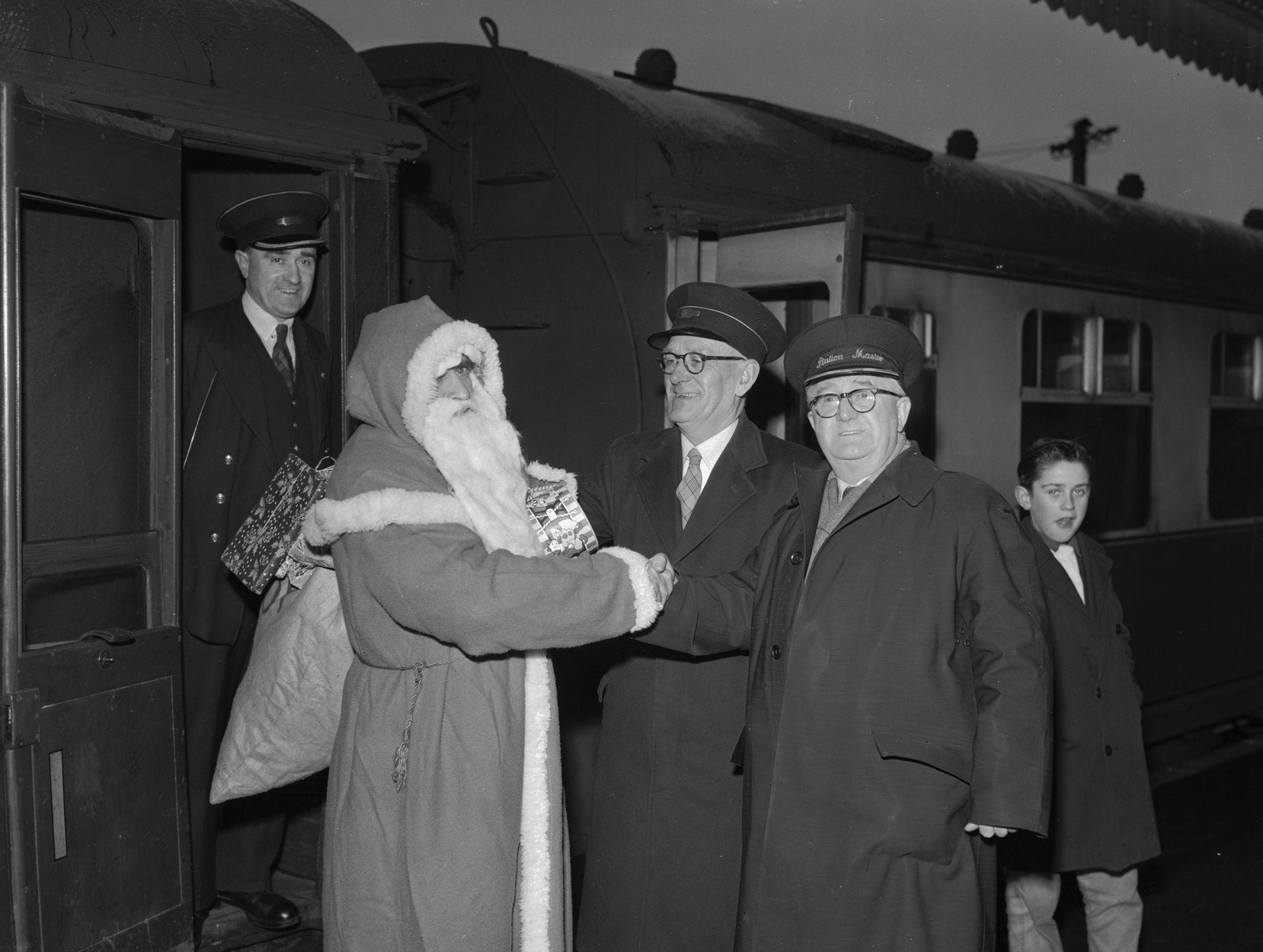
A Welsh Father Christmas in 1959 wearing a long gown and hood trimmed with white fur

Father Christmas appeared in many 20th century English-language works of fiction, including J. R. R. Tolkien's Father Christmas Letters, a series of private letters to his children written between 1920 and 1942 and first published in 1976. Other 20th century publications include C. S. Lewis's The Lion, the Witch and the Wardrobe (1950), Raymond Briggs's Father Christmas (1973) and its sequel Father Christmas Goes on Holiday (1975). The character was also celebrated in popular songs, including "I Believe in Father Christmas" by Greg Lake (1974) and "Father Christmas" by The Kinks (1977).

In 1991, Raymond Briggs's two books were adapted as an animated short film, Father Christmas, starring Mel Smith as the voice of the title character.

== 21st century ==
Modern dictionaries consider the terms Father Christmas and Santa Claus to be synonymous. The respective characters are now to all intents and purposes indistinguishable, although some people are still said to prefer the term 'Father Christmas' over 'Santa Claus', nearly 150 years after Santa Claus's arrival in England. According to Brewer's Dictionary of Phrase and Fable (19th edn, 2012), Father Christmas is considered to be "[a] British rather than a US name for Santa Claus, associating him specifically with Christmas. The name carries a somewhat socially superior cachet and is thus preferred by certain advertisers."
