= Chiesmans =

Former British department store group

- Company type: Private
- Industry: Department store
- Founded: 1884
- Defunct: 1976
- Fate: Take-over by House of Fraser, merged into their Army & Navy division
- Successor: Army & Navy
- Headquarters: Lewisham, London, UK

Chiesmans was a department store group based in Lewisham, London. The business was established in 1884 as a general draper, expanding to become the largest department store in south-east London and operator of a network of branches stretching from Essex to the Isle of Wight. The group was acquired by House of Fraser in 1976. The former Lewisham flagship store closed in 1997.

== Early history ==
Chiesman Brothers was started by the brothers Frank and Harry Chiesman in September 1884 in Lewisham. They bought Cross Brothers drapery business at 59 High Street, Lewisham, which was known as Paris House, and specialised in the sales of remnants and job lots. The brothers changed the business, selling new lines across a variety of product categories in addition to drapery.

The store expanded into neighbouring properties and in 1899, waiting rooms and a tea room were added to the store. Within a few short years the brothers had established Lewisham's leading department store. By 1908 the store encompassed 41-59 High Street. The premises were divided by a road and a tunnel was constructed connecting the two buildings. The furniture department was a particularly successful part of the business and Chiesmans purchased several properties to hold their stock.

After the First World War, the brothers' sons Stewart, Russell and Howard joined the firm and in 1921 a new store was constructed. In the same year the company was incorporated as Chiesmans Limited. During the 1930s the store was extended and other properties were purchased, including property on the opposite side of the High Street. By 1939, a new bridge was built spanning Granville Grove linking the two halves of the main store.

== Expansion ==
In 1933, Chiesmans began a period of expansion beyond Lewisham with the purchase of Denniss Paine & Co. of Maidstone, Kent. The next acquisition was that of Martins of Canterbury in 1949, while a third store was added in 1957 at Gravesend (previously Bon Marche).

In 1957, the business became a Public Limited Company, with most of the shares being retained by the Chiesman family. Over the next two years stores were purchased in Tunbridge Wells (Waymarks, 1958), the Isle of Wight (Edward Morris, 1959), Ilford (Burnes, 1959), Upton Park (John Lewis, 1959) and Rochester (Leonards, 1959). The Lewisham store was extended again in 1960. Additions included a new fabric hall and self-service restaurant. The Rochester store was closed in 1967, with the company blaming Rochester Council's failure to redevelop the city centre and parking policy.

== Takeover ==
In 1972 Chiesmans was purchased by House of Fraser. The stores were brought under the same management as Barkers and Army & Navy as part of the Southern Division trading group of House of Fraser. The former Chiesmans offices at Lewisham became the head office for the regional group.

Further branches were added to the Chiesmans nameplate under House of Fraser's ownership. A number of the former Hide group stores in London and the south-east, which had been acquired in 1975, were initially renamed Chiesmans, including the eponymous Kingston upon Thames store and the J R Roberts branch at Southend. A store was also opened in Bexleyheath.

== Closure ==
Eventually the Chiesmans stores were renamed Army & Navy. Maintenance costs and changing retail patterns led firstly to the Lewisham store shrinking to half its size and later closing down entirely in 1994. Lewisham Police Station stands on the site of the former Chiesmans flagship store. All of the former Chiesmans stores are now closed.

== Legacy ==
Harry Chiesman served as Mayor of Lewisham in 1920 and laid the foundation stone of Lewisham War Memorial, which was given Grade II listed status on 13 July 2016.
