= Army & Navy Stores (United Kingdom) =

Former department store group in the UK

- Type: Private
- Industry: Department store
- Founded: 1884
- Defunct: 1976
- Fate: Take-over by House of Fraser
- Successor: House of Fraser
- Headquarters: Victoria Street, London, UK
- Subsidiaries: William Harvey of Guildford Ltd. Harveys of Camberley; Army & Navy Stores (Bromley) Ltd. Genge & Company Ltd. Thomas White & Company Ltd. J. D. Morant Ltd. Thomas Clarkson & Sons Ltd. Burgis & Colbourne Ltd. Artillery Mansions Ltd.

Army & Navy Stores was a department store group in the United Kingdom, which originated as a co-operative society for military officers and their families during the nineteenth century. The society became a limited liability company in the 1930s and purchased multiple independent department stores during the 1950s and 1960s. In 1973, the Army and Navy Stores group was acquired by House of Fraser. In 2005, the remaining Army & Navy stores (the flagship store on Victoria Street in London and stores in Camberley and Chichester) were refurbished and re-branded under the House of Fraser nameplate. House of Fraser itself was acquired by Icelandic investment company, Baugur Group, in late 2006, and then by Sports Direct in August 2018.

The Victoria Street department store, latterly trading under the name House of Fraser, was in the City of Westminster, to the south of St. James's Park. It was the only department store in the locality. Each of its four selling-floors sold a broad range of merchandise including clothing, accessories and cosmetics, furnishing, household and electrical goods. 'World of Food', a new food hall concept in House of Fraser stores (introduced at Birmingham in 2003), was opened on the ground floor to coincide with the store's relaunch under the 'House of Fraser' name but closed in 2021. The building was demolished in 2022–2023, to be replaced by a 16-storey multi-use building called 105 Victoria.

== History ==
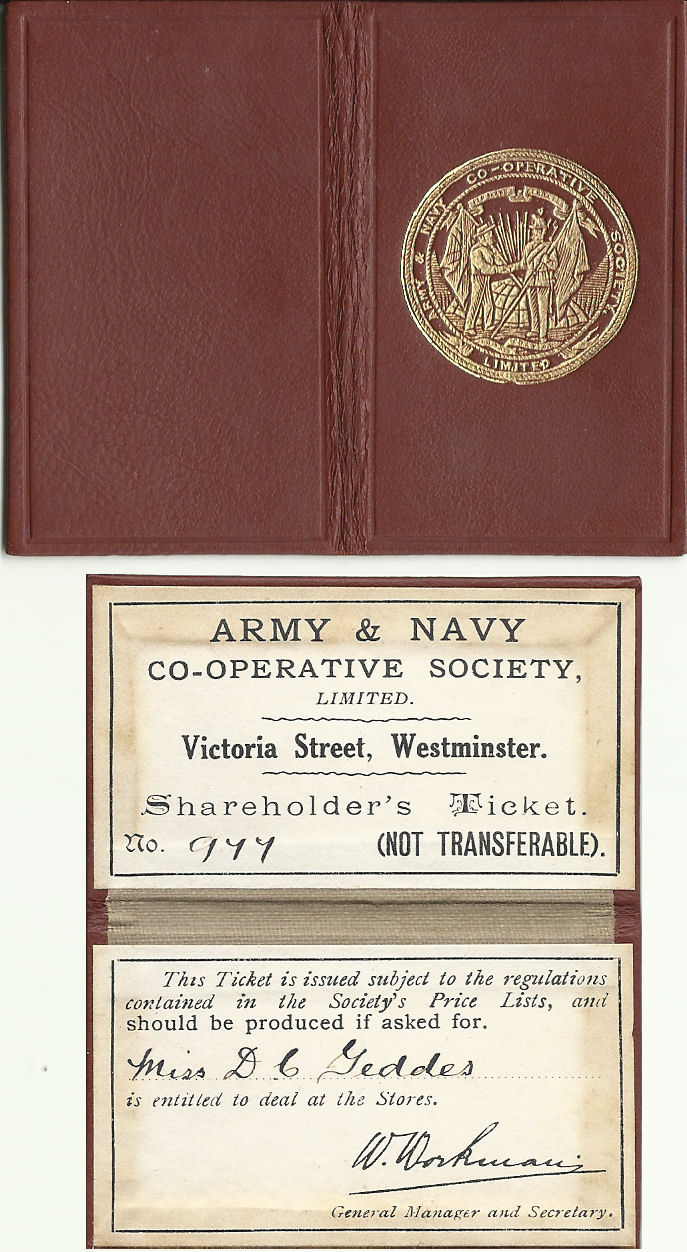
Army & Navy Co-operative society shareholder's ticket

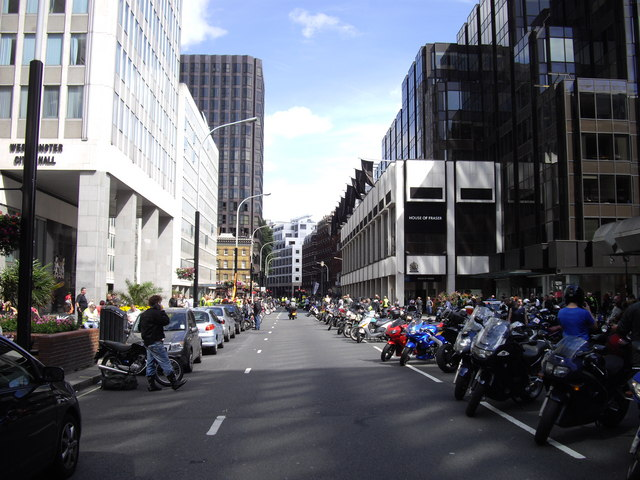
Victoria store, as House of Fraser, on the right

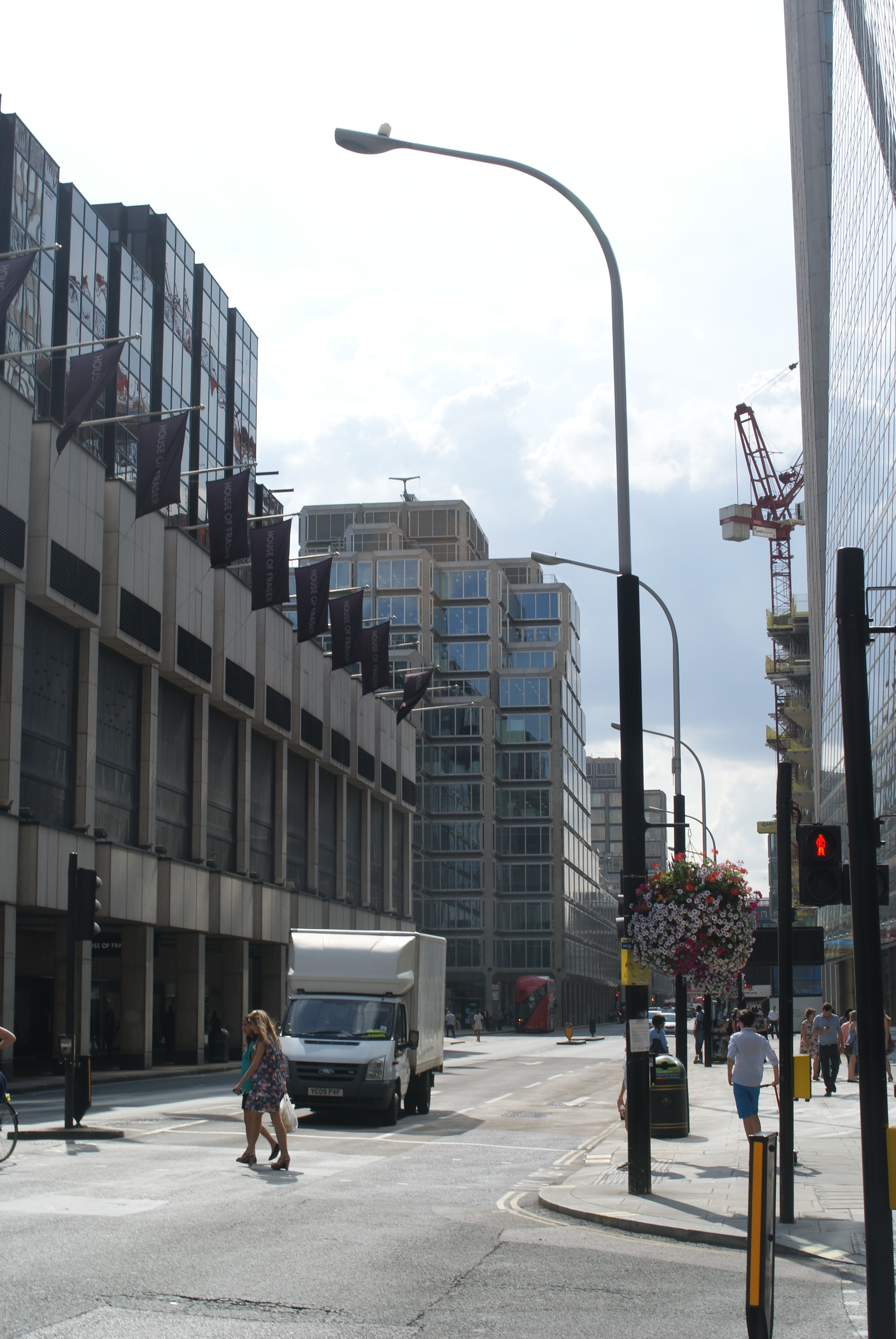
Victoria store as House of Fraser on the left

The Army & Navy Co-operative Society Ltd. was incorporated on 15 September 1871, being formed by a group of army and navy officers. The aim of the military co-operative was to supply goods to its members at the lowest remunerative rates, and was based on two earlier models – the Civil Service Supply Association and the Civil Service Co-operative Society. The society leased part of a distillery premises in Victoria Street, London which was owned by Vickers & Co, and by February 1872 a store for the sale of groceries was opened on the site. By 1873, the store offered stationery, drapery, fancy goods, tailoring, groceries, a chemist and even a guns department. The store proved too small for the growing business so the founding members rented a house next to their existing warehouse and acquired a further warehouse in Johnson Place.

By 1876, the business had again outgrown its premises. They leased more of the distillery from Vickers, closed their warehouse in Johnson Place moving to a new location at Ranelagh Road in Pimlico. The business was now offering a banking department to its members, and had negotiated an option on the site as part of the lease deal at Victoria Street. This option was taken up in 1878, allowing for the purchase of part of the Victoria Street premises. A refreshments room was added to the store for its growing customer base. The store also expanded internationally by opening offices in Paris and Leipzig.

The business continued to expand, and in 1881 the society purchased the remaining distillery and associated buildings. In the following months departments were opened covering the entire site. In addition, warehousing was moved to Tooley Street in Westminster, with the Pimlico site now operating as a manufacturing centre for tailoring and printing. Printing had been carried out in-house since 1877. Further workshop space was purchased in Johnson Street, and offices in Howick Place were converted into selling space. By this time the business had added furniture sales and an estate agency to its operations.

The society continued to grow, so new locations were added. In 1890 stores were opened in Plymouth, and Bombay, India, while in 1891 a further store was opened in Karachi. This Indian adventure continued with stores opening in Calcutta in 1900, while stores in New Delhi, Shimla and Ranchi were opened in the 1930s.

The society continued to expand in London, erecting a new preserved provisions factory in Coburg Road, and purchasing more property along Victoria Street. The society offered an enormous illustrated price list which could be ordered by phone.

The First World War saw trade suffer badly, but this was substituted in part by a contract from the War Office. After the war, the society was affected by strikes by its staff, but it continued to develop its Victoria Street site and by 1922 a new frontage had been added.

The last surviving member of the original board, Captain Ernest Lewis, died on 3 April 1926. He was joint managing director and treasurer until he retired in July 1914 after 43 years with the society. One of his sons was Donald Swain Lewis, senior officer, who died in the Royal Flying Corps in 1916.

In 1934, the society was incorporated into a limited company – Army & Navy Stores Ltd. The Army and Navy Stores Limited 'General Price list 1935-36' listed showrooms and offices at 105 Victoria Street, Francis Street and Howick Place, Westminster SW1. Depots were listed in Union Street, Plymouth, and in India at Esplanade Road, Bombay and Chowringhee, Calcutta. There was also a furniture depository and strong room at Turnham Green and an auction room at Greencoat Place SW1.

The business was hit hard during the Second World War, with both its sites at Turnham Green and Portsmouth suffering serious bomb damage, while its Plymouth depot was completely destroyed. There was more bad trading news when India gained independence in 1947. The last colonial store closed in Bombay in 1952.

With the closure of branches overseas, plans turned to the expansion of the domestic business. In 1953, the company acquired Genge & Co of Dorchester and then William Harvey of Guildford. More provincial department stores were then added: J D Morant of Chichester (1995); Thomas Clarkson of Wolverhampton (1960); Thomas White & Co of Aldershot (1961); Burgis & Colbourne of Leamington Spa (1963) and Parsons & Hart of Andover (1965). The Bromley stores of Harrison Gibson were added to the group in 1968. In addition to these acquisitions, a new store was built in Camberley in 1964 and branded under the William Harvey name, while the stores in Guildford, Chichester, Dorchester and Wolverhampton were given new extensions.

Work on replacing the old Victoria Street store began in 1973. The new building was completed in 1977, designed by London architects Elsom Pack & Roberts.

In 1973, Army and Navy Stores was purchased by the House of Fraser. The John Barker & Co stores in Kensington and Eastbourne were integrated with Army & Navy. The group was later extended by adding the Chiesmans stores, among others, to its portfolio.

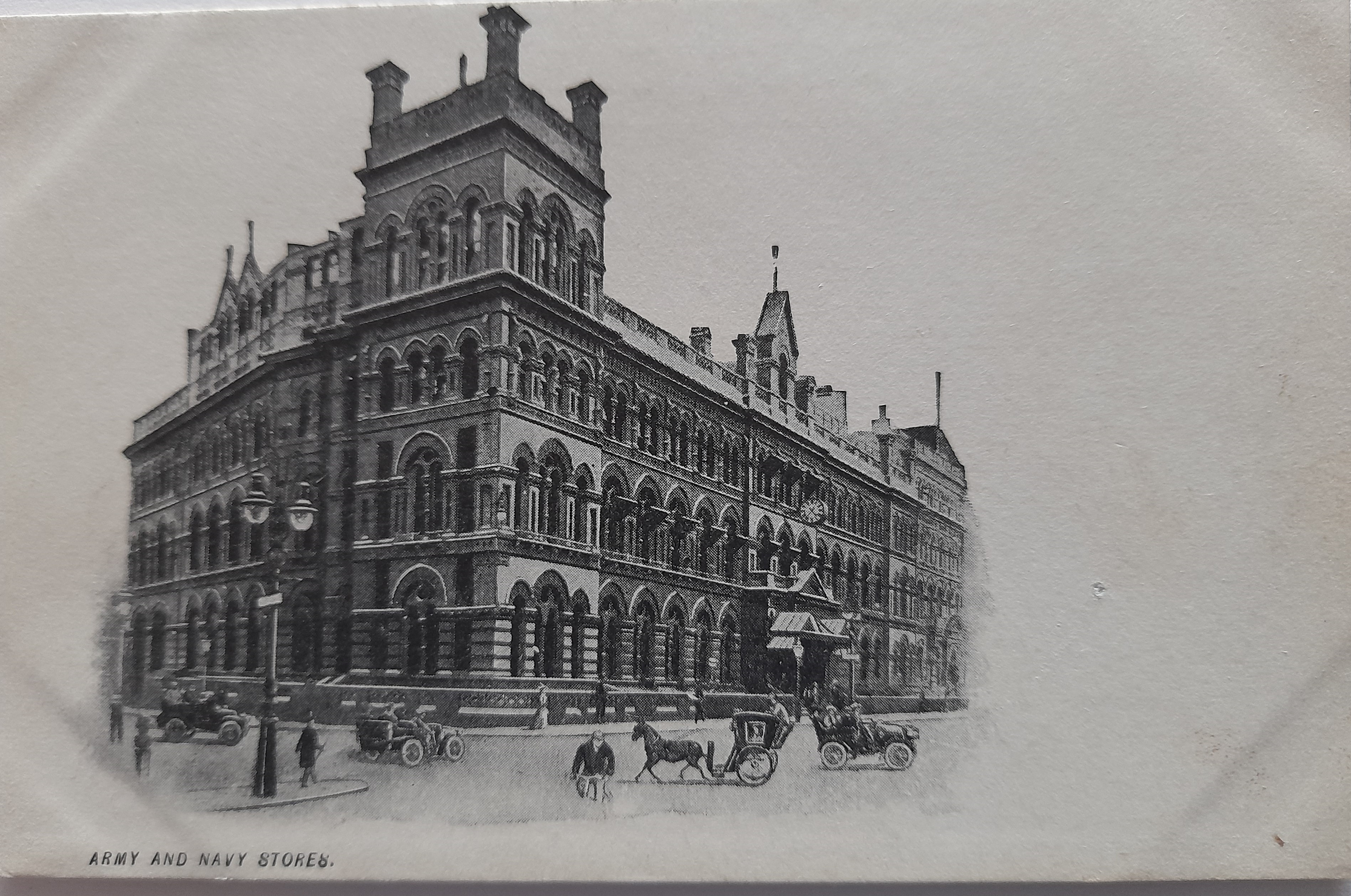
Army & Navy store postcard, 105 Victoria Street, circa 1908.

== Branches ==
- Aldershot, formerly Thomas White.
- Andover, Parsons & Hart; acquired 1965; sold to F W Woolworth & Co. in 1967.
- Basildon, formerly Taylors of Basildon; purchased by House of Fraser in 1979; closed 1994.
- Bexleyheath, formerly Chiesmans
- Bromley, formerly Harrison Gibson; acquired 1968; closed 2004. Part of the site is currently occupied by TK Maxx.
- Camberley, formerly Harveys of Camberley; opened by Army & Navy Stores as a satellite store of William Harvey of Guildford. The store was renamed Army & Navy in 1974.
- Chichester, formerly J D Morant. The business was founded in Southsea, Hampshire and moved to its location opposite Chichester Cathedral in 1942 after its original premises were destroyed by enemy bombing.
- Dorchester, formerly Genge & Co. (originally Genge, Dixon & Jameson).
- Eastbourne, formerly Barkers (originally Dale & Kerley); closed 1997 (the building was subsequently occupied by T J Hughes between 1999 and 2019).
- Epsom, opened 1984; renamed Dickins & Jones in 1987.
- Gravesend, formerly Chiesmans (originally Bon Marche).
- Guildford, formerly William Harvey.
- Hove, formerly Chiesmans (previously Stuart Norris and originally Driscolls).
- Ilford, formerly Chiesmans (originally C W Burnes).
- Kingston-upon-Thames, formerly Chiesmans (originally Hide & Co.).
- Leamington Spa, formerly Burgis & Colbourne; renamed Rackhams in 1976.
- Lewisham, formerly Chiesmans / Chiesman Brothers; closed 1997.
- Maidstone, formerly T C Dunning & Son; closed 2005.
- Newport, Isle of Wight, formerly Chiesmans (originally Morris of Newport / Edward Morris & Co.).
- Southend-on-Sea, formerly Chiesmans (previously a satellite store of J R Roberts of Stratford); closed 1987.
- St. Albans, formerly Greens / W S Green; closed 1969.
- Tunbridge Wells, formerly Chiesmans (originally Waymarks).
- Upton Park, formerly Chiesmans (originally John Lewis).
- Wolverhampton, formerly Thomas Clarkson & Sons.

== Subsidiaries ==
On 13 November 1973, the proposed merger between the Boots and House of Fraser companies was subject of a written question in the House of Commons and the following companies were listed as subsidiaries of Army & Navy:

- William Harvey of Guildford Ltd.
- Harveys of Camberley
- Army & Navy Stores (Bromley) Ltd.
- Genge & Company Ltd.
- Thomas White & Company Ltd.
- J. D. Morant Ltd.
- Thomas Clarkson & Sons Ltd.
- Burgis & Colbourne Ltd.
- Artillery Mansions Ltd.

== In popular culture ==
In Virginia Woolf's Novel Mrs Dalloway which is set on "a June day in 1923", the characters Elizabeth Dalloway and Miss Kilman visit the Victoria Street Army and Navy store and purchase clothes and visit the tea rooms there.

George Orwell mentioned the shop in the context of personal goods (food, clothes, cigarettes) being sent from England to British volunteers on the Republican side of the Spanish Civil War in his book Homage to Catalonia. He said that the only store that was able to make parcels arrive was the Army and Navy, but he suspected "perhaps they might have felt happier if the stuff had been going to Franco's side of the barricade."
