= Donald Swain Lewis =

Royal Flying Corps officer

- Born: 5 April 1886; Banstead, England
- Died: 10 April 1916 (aged 30); Near Wytschaete, Belgium
- Burial place: Lijssenthoek Military Cemetery
- Military career
- Allegiance: United Kingdom
- Branch: British Army
- Service years: 1904–1916
- Rank: Lieutenant Colonel
- Commands: 2nd Wing RFC (1916); No. 3 Squadron RFC (1915)
- Conflicts: First World War
- Awards: Distinguished Service Order; Mentioned in Despatches

Donald Swain Lewis, DSO (5 April 1886 – 10 April 1916) was a British Army officer and military aviator. As a lieutenant colonel, Lewis was the second highest-ranked officer in the Royal Flying Corps to be killed in action in the First World War. His father was Ernest Lewis, one of the founding directors of the Army & Navy Stores.

== First World War ==
On 14 September 1914 Major Geoffrey Salmond, the commanding officer of No. 3 Squadron RFC, and Captain Donald Swain Lewis carried out a successful experiment with a Royal artillery battery using a radio transmitter to communicate the fall of artillery shells. Lewis is also credited with creating the "grid square" map system which revolutionized British wartime cartography. This was probably not an Ordnance Survey style grid based on a system of mile or kilometre squaring, but a system based on squares identified by letters and numbers. In the Battle of the Aisne (September–October 1914), Lewis squared two copies of a 1:80,000 map, keeping one copy for himself for observing from the air, and giving a second copy to a battery commander with whom he was in wireless communication.

On 15 September the British Third Corps assigned its RFC squadrons to support the divisional heavy and howitzer batteries. The radio-equipped aeroplanes successfully supported the artillery in taking out German positions during the offensive on the Aisne.

In April 1915 Lewis was appointed to command No. 3 Squadron, operating on the Western Front. He returned to duties in Great Britain during the winter of 1915–16 before returning to France in February 1916 to take up command the Second Wing, which was assigned to work with the Second Army in the Ypres Salient at that time.

On 10 April 1916, flying a Moräne parasol, east of Wytschaete, with Captain A. W. Gale, an officer of the Trench Mortars, as observer, he was brought down by a direct hit from the enemy's anti-aircraft guns. Gale was wounded.

== Personal life ==
Donald Swain Lewis married Margaret Agnes Maud Williams (1881–1942), daughter of Philip Williams, a retired Eton master, at St. Mark's, Farnborough, on 4 August 1914. They had no children. His widow later remarried.

Military offices
Preceded by John Salmond	Officer Commanding No. 3 Squadron; April – November 1915	Succeeded by Edgar Ludlow-Hewitt
Preceded by John Salmond	Officer Commanding 2nd Wing; 1916	Unknown
