= Edwin Lees =

British botanist and antiquarian

Edwin Lees (1800–1887) was a British botanist and antiquarian.

== Life ==
He was born in Worcester in 1800, was educated at Birmingham. He began his career as a printer and stationer at 87 High Street, Worcester, and in 1828 he published, under the pseudonym of Ambrose Florence. a guide to the city and cathedral, which contained a catalogue of the plants in the vicinity. He also contributed lists to Loudon's Magazine and to Sir C. Hastings's Natural History of Worcestershire. In 1829, he began to publish The Worcestershire Miscellany, of which, only five numbers and a supplement appeared. It was issued in book form in 1831. On 12 January 1829, he founded the Worcester Literary and Scientific Institute, of which he was joint secretary. He gave up business early in life, and devoted all his energies to local botany.

He died on 21 October 1887.

== Bibliography ==
- Christmas and the new year, a masque (1827)
- The Affinities of Plants with Man and Animals: Their Analogies and Associations; a Lecture Delivered Before the Worcestershire Natural History Society, November 26, 1833 ... With Additional Notes and Illustrations (1834)
- The Botanical Looker-Out Among the Wild Flowers of England and Wales, at All Seasons, and in the Most Interesting Localities (1842)
- Stratford as connected with Shakespeare (1854)
- Pictures of nature in the silurian region around the Malvern hills and vale of Severn (1856)
- Botany of Worcestershire (1867)
- Botany of the Malvern Hills (1868)
- The Forest and Chace of Malvern, Its Ancient and Present State: With Notices of the Most Remarkable Old Trees, Remaining Within Its Confines (1877)
- Scenery and Thought in Poetical Pictures of Various Landscape Scenes and Portraits (1880)
