= J R Roberts Stores =

Former British department store

Coordinates: 51.542°N 0.002°E

- Company type: Private company
- Industry: Retail
- Genre: Department store
- Founded: 1870
- Defunct: 1975
- Fate: Purchased by House of Fraser in 1975
- Successor: Chiesmans
- Headquarters: Stratford, London; Southend-on-Sea
- Key people: John Reynold Roberts
- Parent: Hide & Co 1950-1975; House of Fraser 1975

J R Roberts Stores was a small department store chain formed by John R. Roberts that operated in the South East of England, before the business was purchased by the multiple retail store company, Hide & Co in 1950. The Stratford store was sold off, and the Southend store continued to trade under the J R Roberts Stores name until Hide & Co were purchased by House of Fraser in 1975, and the store was rebranded.

== History ==
J R Roberts Stores opened in 1870 in Stratford, London as a drapery and furniture shop at 96 Broadway, The store expanded into a full line department store and occupied 78-102 Broadway.

In 1888, it is reported that J R Roberts opened the first Christmas grotto in a UK department store. Later their Christmas fairs were known for animated soldiers, sailors and other toy figures. During the early part of the 20th century, the postcard artist Hermann Fleury Jnr fitted out the Christmas display for a fee of £200. In 1894, the business was incorporated with a value of £202,500 and was listed on the London Stock Exchange.

In 1895, Queen Mary Hospital at West Ham opened a new wing and the two main wards were named after J R Roberts who had paid for the furniture.

The business expanded in 1899 when they opened a second store in Nelson Street, Southend-on-Sea, as a subsidiary (Company no. 00338672) of the Stratford branch. They also announced they would stop selling alcohol in their Stratford store as part of the temperance movement. However by 1902, the business would close its grocery department, and the business announced that after costs being taken from their profit of £46,066, the company could not pay a dividend. The company's shares were reconstituted in 1911 due to issues with dividend payments, with preference share holders given ordinary shares, and the value of the existing ordinary shareholders values written down. The Stratford store was rebuilt at a cost of £25,000, adding a 260 foot arcade in 1927. In 1933, the company moved their Southend-on-Sea store from Nelson Street to 90 High Street, which had been home to Percy Ravens since 1900. In 1950 the business was purchased by retail group Hide & Co.

In 1954, J R Roberts closed their Stratford store and sold it to the London Co-operative Society (who demolished the old buildings and built a new department store between 1957 and 1962). The Southend store became part of House of Fraser in 1975 after they purchased Hide & Co, and was renamed Chiesmans, before becoming an Army & Navy store after another rebrand, and was finally closed by House of Fraser in 1984. The premises have since been occupied by Dixons / Currys and Morrisons Local. It was occupied by the community hub, The Ironworks, however in 2025, American fried chicken chain Popeyes opened in the building.
