= Christmas elf =

Western folklore creature

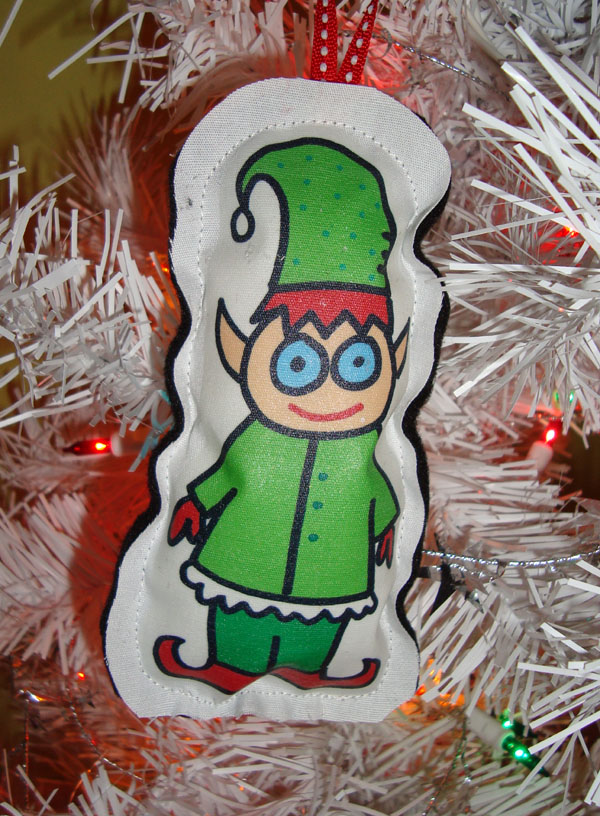
An elf on a Christmas ornament

In English-speaking cultures, Christmas elves are diminutive elves that live with Santa Claus at the North Pole and act as his helpers. Christmas elves are usually depicted as green- or red-clad, with large, pointy ears and wearing pointy hats. They are most often depicted as humanoids, but sometimes as furry mammals with tails. Santa's elves are often said to make the toys in Santa's workshop and take care of his reindeer, among other tasks.

The association of Christmas presents with elves has precedents in the first half of the 19th century with the Scandinavian nisse or tomte, and Saint Nicholas himself is called an elf in A Visit from St. Nicholas (1823).

== Origin ==
The English word elf derives from the álfar from Ancient Norse mythology. This folklore predates the Christmas characters by many hundred years. Elves originated from Germanic mythology. In various regions of Europe there were similar supernatural beings that can be connected to elves, such as kobolds from Germany and house spirits named brownies in Scotland. In medieval Europe, elves were seen as nefarious and were often linked to demons.

The image of elves in the workshop was popularized by Godey's Lady's Book, with a front cover illustration for its 1873 Christmas issue showing Santa surrounded by toys and elves with the caption "Here we have an idea of the preparations that are made to supply the young folks with toys at Christmas time". During this time, Godey's was immensely influential to the birth of Christmas traditions, having shown the first widely circulated picture of a modern Christmas tree on the front cover of its 1850 Christmas issue. Additional recognition was given in Austin Thompson's 1876 work "The House of Santa Claus, a Christmas Fairy Show for Sunday Schools".

=== Saint Nicholas as an elf ===
In the 1823 poem A Visit from St. Nicholas (commonly known as 'Twas the Night Before Christmas), often attributed to Clement Clarke Moore, Santa Claus himself is described in line 45: "He was chubby and plump, a right jolly old elf". Prior to the influence of Saint Nicholas in Sweden, the job of giving out gifts was done by the Yule goat. By 1891, the saint had merged with Tomten, which was previously an elfish / dwarfish farm guardian. Following the work of Jenny Nyström, this hybrid figure became known as Jultomten.

== Contemporary pop culture ==
Sailors aboard USS Harry S. Truman watch a screening of the 2003 Christmas film Elf

In North America and the British Isles, the modern legend of Santa Claus typically includes diminutive elves at Christmas; green-clad elves with pointy ears and pointy hats as Santa's employees / assistants. They make the toys in Santa's workshop located in the North Pole. In recent years, other toys—usually high-tech toys like computers, video games, DVDs, and DVD players, and even mobile phones—have also been depicted as being ready for delivery, but not necessarily made, in the workshop as well. In this portrayal, elves slightly resemble nimble and delicate versions of dwarves.

In recent films (e.g. The Santa Clause series and The Christmas Chronicles), the elves' jobs also include operating police and air forces protecting the North Pole, helping Santa outside the Pole when he is captured by the real-world police, and as Santa's secret-service-like bodyguards (Fred Claus).

The elves are generally said to live for hundreds, or even thousands, of years, despite the fact that in some cases they appear eternally youthful as children.

=== In films and television ===
Christmas elves have had their role expanded in modern films and television. They are generally portrayed in live-action films either by little actors, children, forced perspective to make normal-sized actors appear diminutive, or computer-generated imagery (CGI); otherwise by traditional animation, stop-motion animation, or computer animation according to the format of the film. For instance:

- The 1932 Disney traditional animated short film Santa's Workshop, features Santa Claus and the elves preparing for Christmas.
- Santa's elves feature prominently in the Rankin-Bass 1964 stop-motion TV special Rudolph the Red-Nosed Reindeer. A distinctive, colorful costume design was created, with red, green, blue, or pink outfits topped with cone-shaped hats. Most elves fit the short, plump stereotype, but for diversity, one elf is taller and thinner than the others and wears horn-rimmed glasses. The special was sponsored by General Electric, and the elves were featured in the GE small appliance commercials.
- In the 1985 live action feature One Magic Christmas, there are no elves; Santa runs his toy factory using "Christmas angels", who are deceased adults.
- In the 1985 live-action Santa Claus: The Movie, the elves are a type of craft guild making traditional toys by hand and looking after Santa's reindeer.
- In the 1994 live action feature The Santa Clause and its sequels, Santa's elves are portrayed by children or teenagers, despite being hundreds of years old. Bernard, the number one elf, was portrayed by sixteen-year-old David Krumholtz. By the time the second sequel was made in 2006, Krumholz was too old to play an elf and was starring as an adult in his own television series, so the number two elf was promoted to number one.
- The Christmas Elves are featured in the 1998 TV movie Like Father, Like Santa.
- The 2003 live-action Will Ferrell comedy Elf pays homage to the 1964 Rudolph special by copying the colorful costume design for the elves, who are all portrayed by forced perspective of the normal-sized actors.
- In the 2007 live-action Fred Claus, most elves, such as head elf Willie (John Michael Higgins), are created by forced perspective. The single exception is Santa's bookkeeper Charlene (Elizabeth Banks), who is a human-sized elf.
- Disney used the theme of Christmas elves for their 2009 short film, Prep & Landing, which tells the tale of an elite group of elves that make houses ready for Santa's deliveries. It was the first holiday television special made by Walt Disney Animation Studios.
- The Christmas Elves were featured in the 2011 animated film Arthur Christmas.
- In the 2012 DreamWorks Animation animated film Rise of the Guardians, elves are very short beings who wear pointy hat-like clothes and assist Santa at the North Pole, but they don't make the toys, the elves are only led to believe this, as yetis are actually responsible for making the toys in the film.
- The Christmas Chronicles (2018) portrays the elves as diminutive CGI creatures with their own language, spoken also by Santa. They are about two feet tall with a two-head total body proportion, large eyes, and long, pointed ears. Their bodies are covered with a thin coat of fur and they have S-shaped hairy tails, giving them a somewhat rodent-like appearance. In the 2020 sequel The Christmas Chronicles 2, they are divided into two camps, with one faction of "naughty elves" led by Belsnickel, who plots to overthrow Santa.

=== In literature ===
Valentine D'Arcy Sheldon's children's picture book, The Christmas Tree Elf, tells the origin story of how Santa met his elves. It also introduces Blink the elf, who introduces Santa to the elves and saves Christmas by extinguishing a Christmas tree fire.

A strong connection to Christmas and elves can be found in the popular fairy tale "The Elves and the Shoemaker" published by the Brothers Grimm in 1812. In this tale a shoemaker, who had not been able to meet the demand to make more shoes, is greeted by several elves just before Christmas to finish all the shoes for him.

== Around the world ==
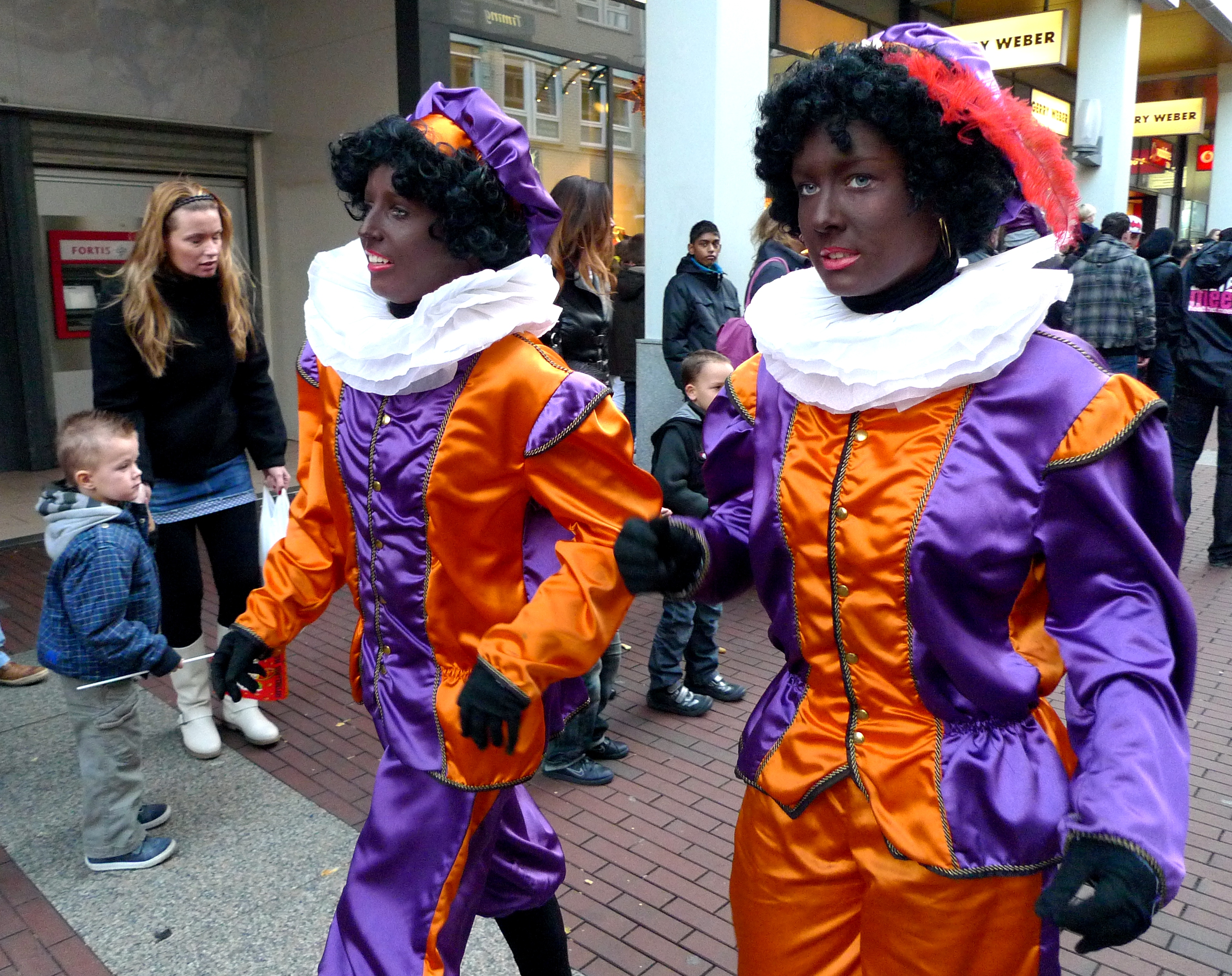
Two Zwarte Pieten, St. Nicholas' companion in Belgium and the Netherlands.

In European countries, Santa has differing helpers depending on the country. In the Netherlands and Belgium, Saint Nicholas is accompanied by Zwarte Piet (Black Peter) whose inclusion has become a controversial issue for the blackface depiction of the character.

In Germany, the companions are the Knecht Ruprecht and in Luxembourg, they are known as Hoesecker.

In Nordic countries, Christmas Elves are considered nisser and not elves and they will usually wear only red instead of the green and red outfits that they are known for in English speaking countries.

== See also ==
- The Elf on the Shelf: A Christmas Tradition, 2005 children's book
