= Krijgsman =

Krijgsman is a surname. Notable people with the surname include:

- Anton Krijgsman (1898–1974), Dutch cyclist
- Bianca Krijgsman (born 1997), Dutch comedian and actress
- Leon Krijgsman (born 1973), Dutch singer
- Marion Krijgsman (born 1973), Dutch former competitive figure skater
