= Companions of Saint Nicholas =

Folkloric figures who accompany the gift-bringer

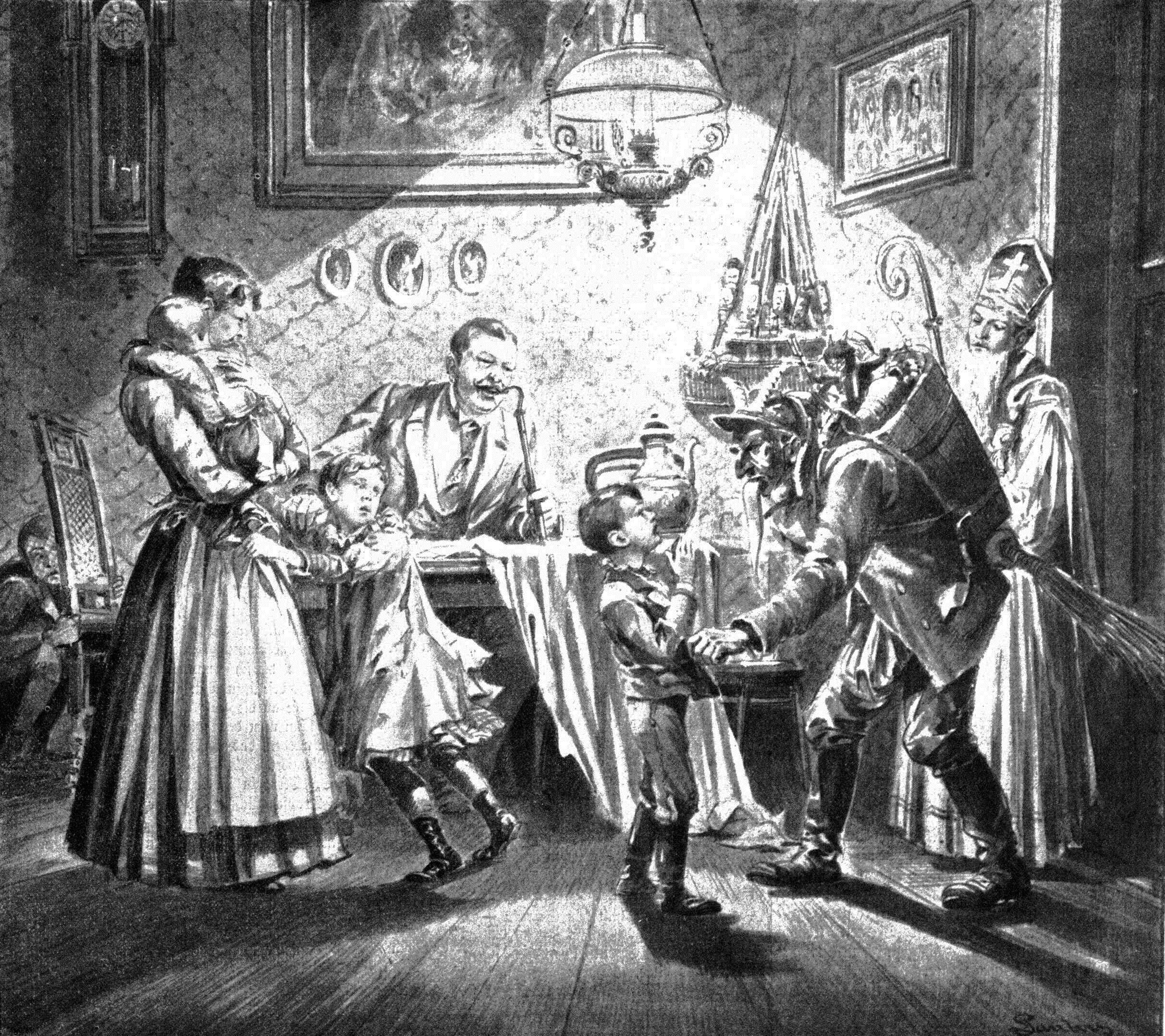
Saint Nicholas and Krampus visit a Viennese home (1896 illustration).

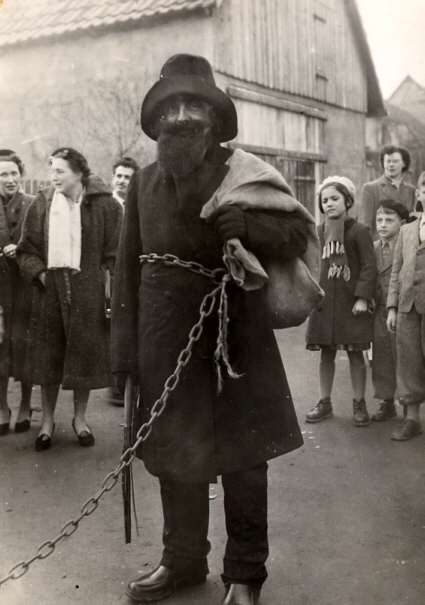
The Hans Trapp character in a 1953 photograph taken in Wintzenheim, Alsace.

The companions of Saint Nicholas are a group of closely related figures who accompany Saint Nicholas throughout the territories formerly in the Holy Roman Empire or the countries that it influenced culturally. These characters act as a foil to the benevolent Christmas gift-bringer, threatening to thrash or abduct disobedient children. Jacob Grimm (Deutsche Mythologie) associated this character with the pre-Christian house spirit (kobold, elf) which could be benevolent or malicious, but whose mischievous side was emphasized after Christianization. The association of the Christmas gift-bringer with elves has parallels in English and Scandinavian folklore, and is ultimately and remotely connected to the Christmas elf in modern American folklore.

Names for the "dark" or threatening companion figure include: Knecht Ruprecht in Germany, Krampus in Austria, Bavaria, Parkelj in Slovenia, Friuli, Croatia, Hungary (spelled Krampusz); Klaubauf in Bavaria, Austria; Bartel in Styria; Pelzebock; Befana; Pelznickel; Belzeniggl; Belsnickel in the Palatinate (and also Pennsylvania, due to Pennsylvania Dutch influence); Schmutzli in the German-speaking part of Switzerland; Rumpelklas; Bellzebub; Hans Muff; Drapp; and Buzebergt in Augsburg.

The corresponding figure in the Netherlands and Flanders is called Zwarte Piet or Black Pete, and in Swiss-German folklore Schmutzli, (schmutz meaning dirt). In the Czech Republic, Saint Nicholas or svatý Mikuláš is accompanied by the čert (Devil) and anděl (Angel). In France, Saint Nicholas' companion is called Rubbels in German-speaking Lorraine and Hanstrapp in Alsace, East of France and the Père Fouettard (Wallonia, Northern and Eastern France).

== Appearance ==
Often the subject of winter poems and tales, the Companions travel with Saint Nicholas carrying with them a rod (sometimes a stick and in modern times often a broom) and a sack. They are sometimes dressed in black rags, bearing a black face and unruly black hair. In many contemporary portrayals the companions look like dark, sinister, or rustic versions of Nicholas himself, with a similar costume but with a darker color scheme.

=== Knecht Ruprecht ===
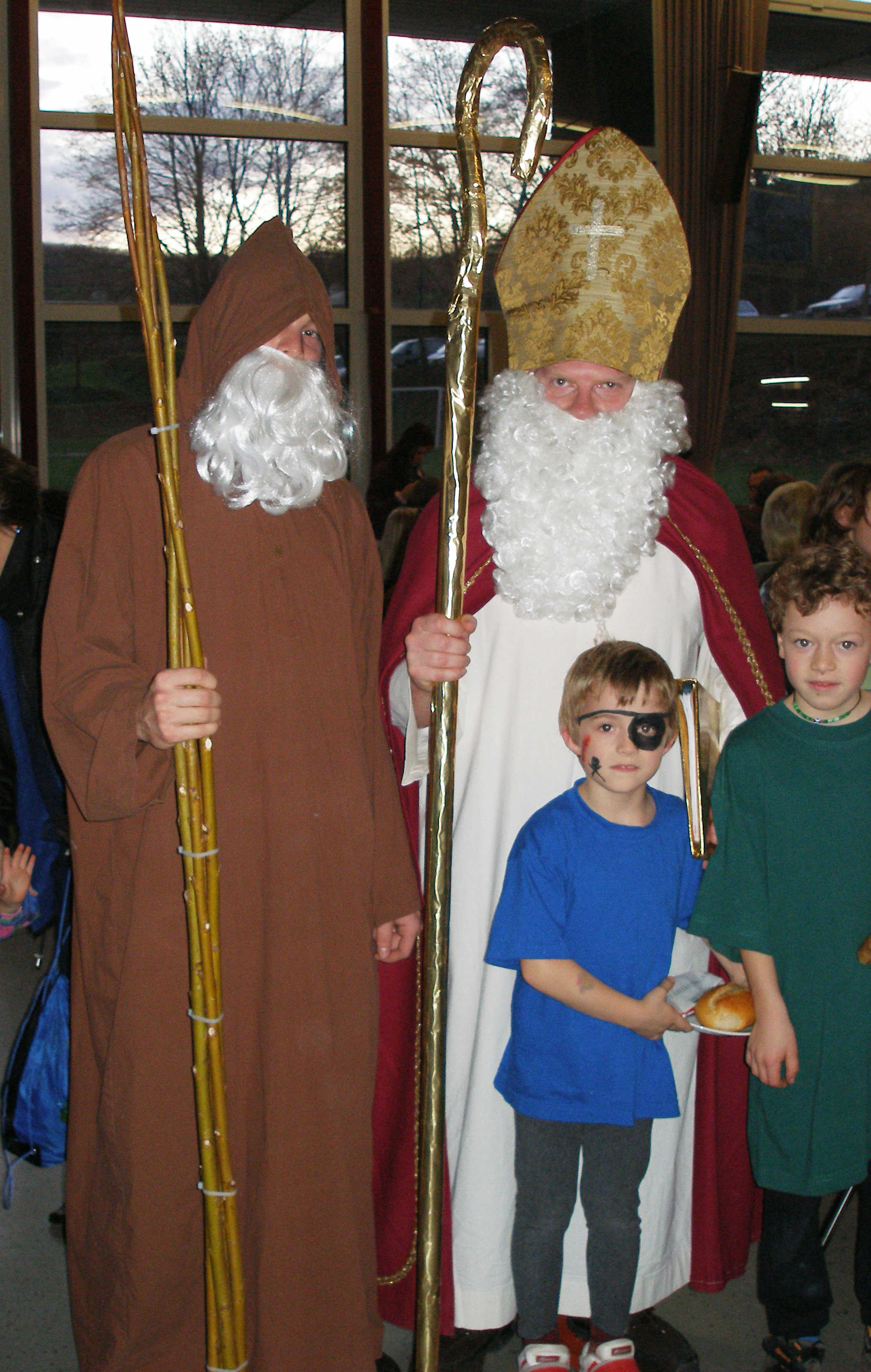
Knecht Ruprecht (on the left) and Saint Nicholas

In the folklore of Germany, Knecht Ruprecht, which translates as Farmhand Rupert or Servant Rupert, is a companion of Saint Nicholas, and possibly the most familiar. Tradition holds that he was a man with a long beard, wearing fur or covered in pea-straw. Knecht Ruprecht sometimes carried a long staff and a bag of ashes, and wore little bells on his clothes.

According to tradition, Knecht Ruprecht asks children whether they know their prayers. If they do, they receive apples, nuts, and gingerbread. If they do not, he beats the children with his bag of ashes. In other (presumably more modern) versions of the story, Knecht Ruprecht gives naughty children gifts such as lumps of coal, sticks, and stones, while well-behaving children receive sweets from Saint Nicholas. He also can be known to give naughty children a switch (stick) in their shoes instead of candy, fruit and nuts, in the German tradition.

Ruprecht was a common name for the devil in Germany and Grimm states that "Robin fellow is the same home-sprite whom we in Germany call Knecht Ruprecht and exhibit to children at Christmas ..." Knecht Ruprecht first appears in written sources in the 17th century, as a figure in a Nuremberg Christmas procession.

According to Alexander Tille, Knecht Ruprecht represented an archetypal manservant, "and has exactly as much individuality of social rank and as little personal individuality as the Junker Hanns and the Bauer Michel, the characters representative of country nobility and peasantry respectively." Tille also states that Knecht Ruprecht originally had no connection with Christmastime.

Ruprecht sometimes walks with a limp, because of a childhood injury. Often, his black clothes and dirty face are attributed to the soot he collects as he goes down chimneys. In some of the Ruprecht traditions, the children would be summoned to the door to perform tricks, such as a dance or singing a song to impress upon Santa and Ruprecht that they were indeed good children. Those who performed badly would be beaten soundly by Servant Ruprecht, and those who performed well were given a gift or some treats. Those who performed badly enough or had committed other misdeeds throughout the year were put into Ruprecht's sack and taken away, variously to Ruprecht's home in the Black Forest to be consumed later, or to be tossed into a river. In other versions the children must be asleep, and would awake to find their shoes filled with either sweets, coal, or in some cases a stick.

=== Krampus ===
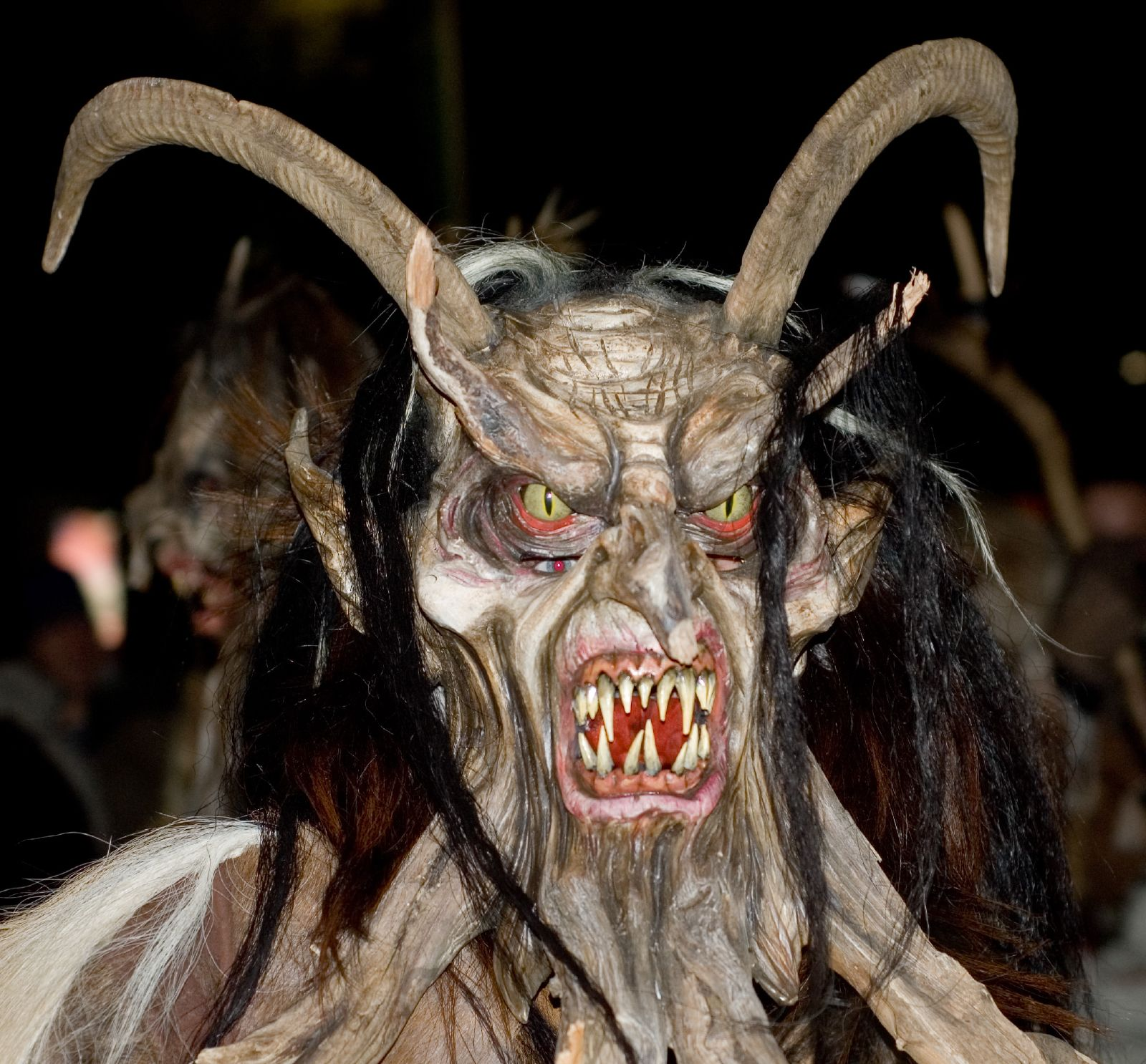
A modern Krampus at the Perchtenlauf in Klagenfurt (2006)

Krampus is a terrifying figure found in parts of Austria, Bavaria, Northern Italy, Slovenia, and Croatia, most probably originating in the Pre-Christian Alpine traditions. In Tyrol, he is also called "Tuifl".

The Feast of Saint Nicholas is celebrated in parts of Europe on December 6. On the preceding evening, Krampusnacht, the wicked hairy devil appears on the streets. He sometimes accompanies St. Nicholas. However, Krampus will at times be on his own, visiting homes and businesses. Saint Nicholas dispenses gifts, while Krampus supplies coal and bundles of birch branches.

Europeans have been exchanging Krampuskarten, greeting cards featuring Krampus, since the 1800s. A Krampuslauf is a run of celebrants dressed as the beast, and is still quite popular, many of the participants fortified with schnapps. Over 1200 "Krampus" gather in Schladming, Styria from all over Austria wearing goat-hair costumes and carved masks, carrying bundles of sticks used as switches and swinging cowbells to warn of their approach. In the past few decades village Krampus associations parade without St. Nicholas at Krampus events throughout late November and early December.

In 2011, National Public Radio helped advertise the formation of a Krampuslauf by Krampus enthusiasts in Philadelphia.

=== Belsnickel ===
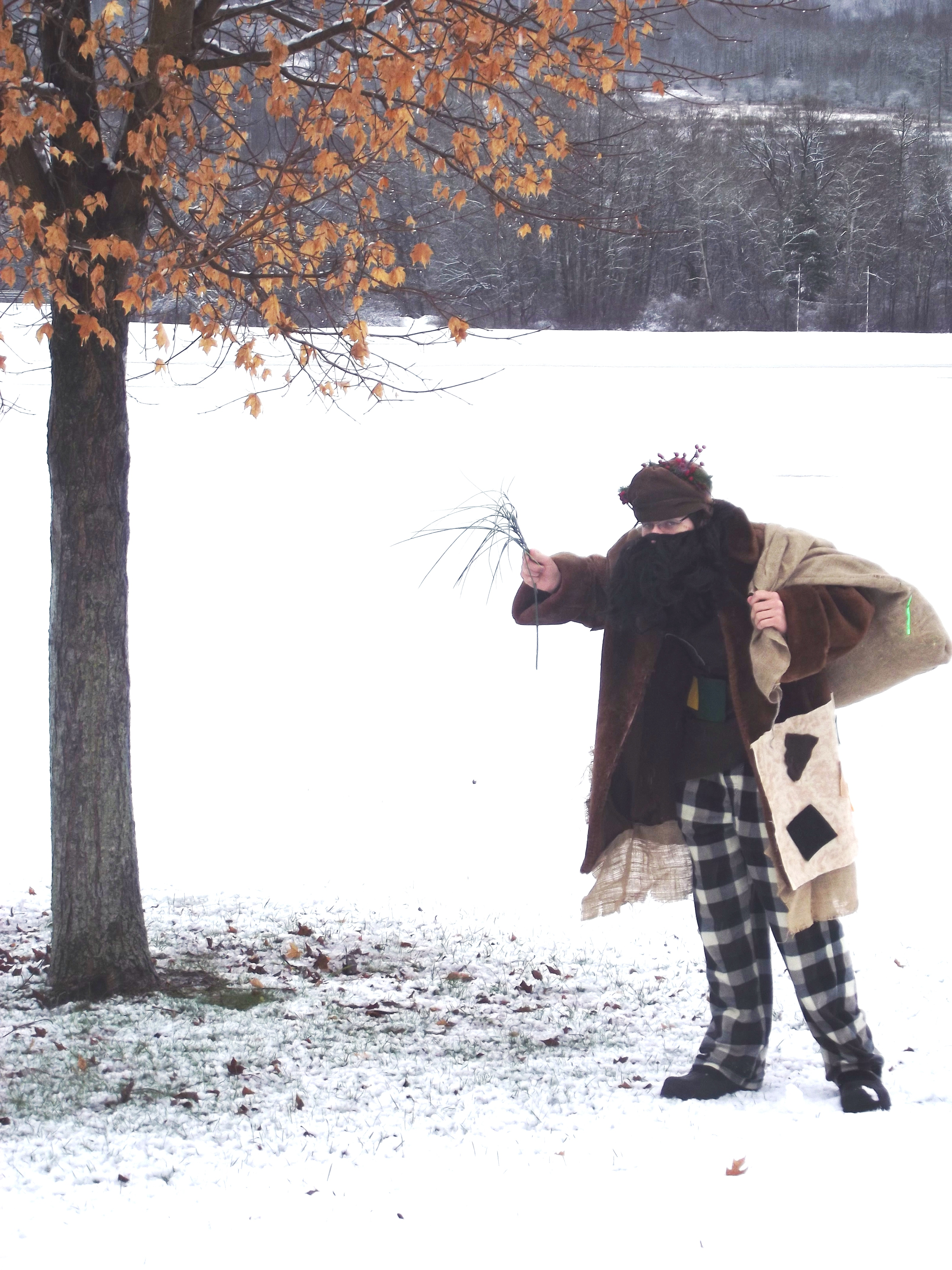
Modern day Belsnickel on his way to scare children in his travel attire, December 2012

Belsnickel is a companion of Saint Nicholas in the Palatinate (Pfalz), Germany. Belsnickel is a man wearing fur which covers his entire body, and he sometimes wears a mask with a long tongue. He is a rather scary creature who visits children at Christmas time and delivers socks or shoes full of candy, but if the children were not good, they will find coal in their stockings instead.

In parts of the United States in the 19th century, "Pelznickel" traditions were maintained for a time among immigrants at least as far west as the US state of Indiana. Today, remnants of this tradition remain, known as the Belsnickel, especially in Pennsylvania.

A first-hand 19th-century account of the "Beltznickle" tradition in Allegany County, Maryland, can be found in Brown's Miscellaneous Writings, a collection of essays by Jacob Brown (born 1824). Writing of a period around 1830, Brown says, "we did not hear of" Santa Claus. Instead, the tradition called for a visit by a different character altogether:

He was known as Kriskinkle, Beltznickle and sometimes as the Xmas woman. Children then not only saw the mysterious person, but felt him or rather his stripes upon their backs with his switch. The annual visitor would make his appearance some hours after dark, thoroughly disguised, especially the face, which would sometimes be covered with a hideously ugly phiz – generally wore a female garb – hence the name Christmas woman – sometimes it would be a veritable woman but with masculine force and action. He or she would be equipped with an ample sack about the shoulders filled with cakes, nuts, and fruits, and a long hazel switch which was supposed to have some kind of a charm in it as well as a sting. One would scatter the goodies upon the floor, and then the scramble would begin by the delighted children, and the other hand would ply the switch upon the backs of the excited youngsters – who would not show a wince, but had it been parental discipline there would have been screams to reach a long distance.

On the South Shore of Nova Scotia, Canada, a Christmas tradition known as Belsnickling occurs, where, similar to mummering, people go from house to house within the communities dressed in multiple layers of clothing and with scarves around their faces to conceal their identity. These people are then given food and drinks (usually rum or eggnog) until their identities are guessed, and then they're off to the next house.

=== Zwarte Piet (Black Pete) ===
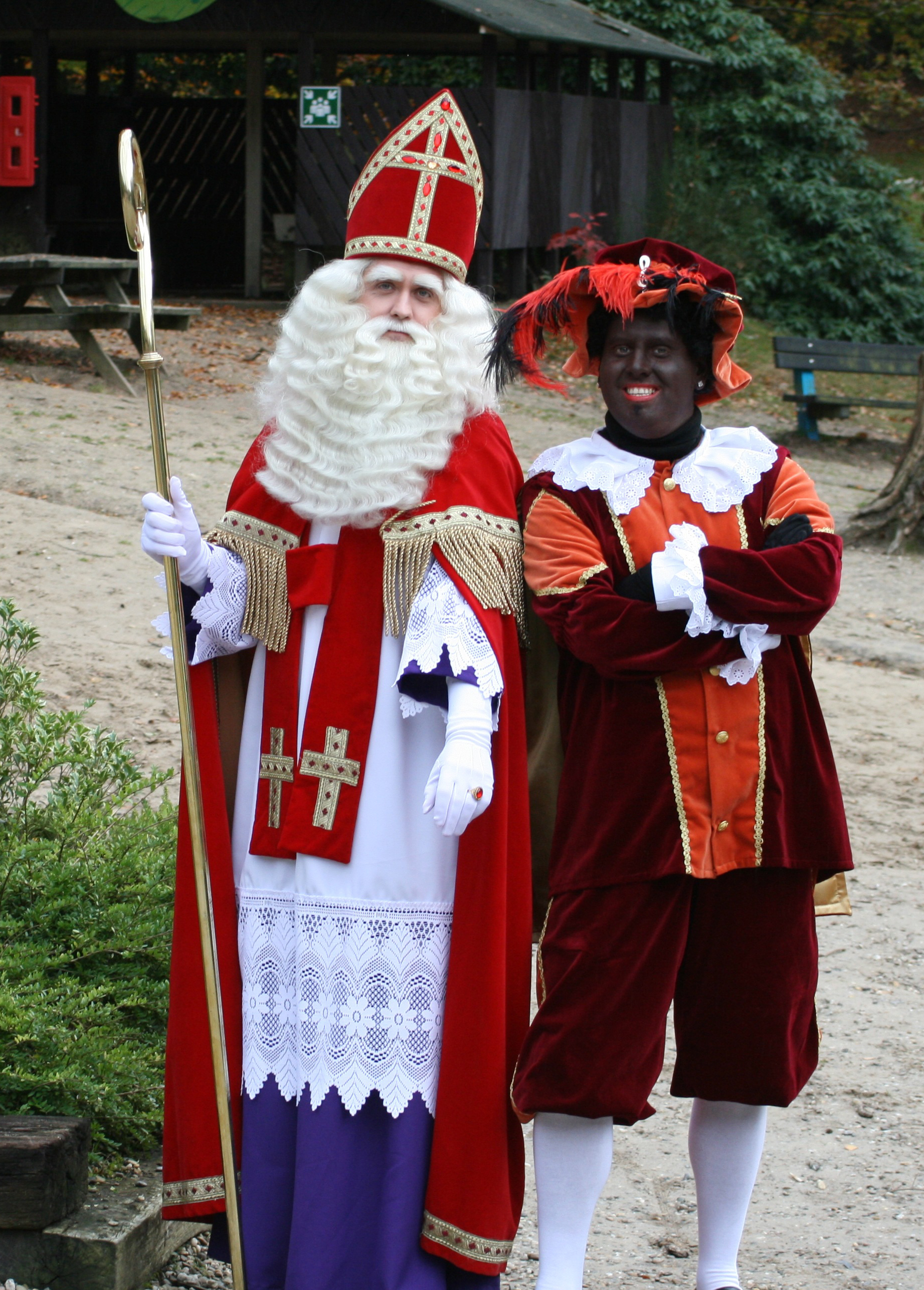
Sinterklaas and Zwarte Piet

Zwarte Piet (English: Black Peter or Black Pete, French: Père-Fouettard, meaning father whipper) is the companion of Saint Nicholas (Dutch: Sinterklaas) in the folklore of the Low Countries. The character first appeared in his current form in an 1850 book by Jan Schenkman and is commonly depicted as a blackamoor. Traditionally Zwarte Piet is said to be black because he is a Moor from Spain. Participants portraying Zwarte Piet typically wear blackface make-up, by painting their faces black, wearing exaggerated red lipstick, and a "nappy" or "kinky" wig, as well as colorful Renaissance attire and gold earrings. The character has become a reoccurring subject of controversy, especially in the Netherlands, for its perceived cultural and ethnic insensitivity. Historically, Zwarte Piet is referred to as a servant, not a companion.

Like Knecht Ruprecht, he was traditionally the one punishing ill-behaved children by beating them with a birch rod or even taking them back to Spain in a sack he carried (which on arrival contained the gifts for the good children). However, in the 20th century these punishments were abolished and Zwarte Piet became a friendly character, although the punishments can still be heard in Sinterklaas songs.

== See also ==
- Joulupukki – Christmas figure from Finland
- Mr. Bingle – Fictional character used for marketing purposes by retailers in New Orleans, Louisiana
- Santa Claus's reindeer – Legendary sleigh-pulling flying reindeer
- Christmas elf – Western folklore creature
- Snegurochka – Character in Russian fairy tales
