= Dwight Christmas =

- The Office episode
- Episode no.: Season 9 Episode 9
- Directed by: Charles McDougall
- Written by: Robert Padnick
- Cinematography by: Matt Sohn
- Editing by: Claire Scanlon
- Production code: 9010
- Original air date: December 6, 2012
- Running time: 22 minutes

Guest appearances
- Mark Proksch as Nate Nickerson; Bobby Ray Shafer as Bob Vance

Episode chronology
← Previous "The Target"	Next → "Lice"
- The Office (American season 9)

"Dwight Christmas" is the ninth episode of the ninth season of the American comedy television series The Office and the 185th episode overall. The episode was written by Robert Padnick and directed by Charles McDougall. It originally aired on NBC on December 6, 2012. The episode guest stars Robert R. Shafer as Bob Vance and Mark Proksch as Nate.

The series depicts the everyday lives of office employees in the Scranton, Pennsylvania branch of the fictional Dunder Mifflin Paper Company. In this episode, Dwight Schrute (Rainn Wilson) gets everyone to celebrate with a traditional Schrute Pennsylvania Dutch Christmas. Darryl Philbin (Craig Robinson) fears that Jim Halpert (John Krasinski) has forgotten to include him in the new job in Philadelphia. Pete (Jake Lacy) teaches Erin Hannon (Ellie Kemper) about his favorite movie, Die Hard.

"Dwight Christmas" received generally positive reviews from television critics, with many noting that it resembled past Christmas episodes of The Office. The episode was also viewed by 4.16 million viewers and received a 2.1/6 percent rating among adults between the ages of 18 and 49, ranking fourth in its timeslot. The episode, however, ultimately ranked as the highest-rated NBC series of the night.

== Synopsis ==
The party planning committee drops the ball on the annual Christmas party, and on the behest of Jim Halpert, Dwight Schrute gets everyone to celebrate with a traditional Schrute Pennsylvania Dutch Christmas. He dresses up as the traditional winter Christmas gift-bringer figure Belsnickel, cooks German food, and plays a game similar to "Naughty or Nice". The festivities cause displeasure among all the employees except Jim and Pam Halpert, who are amused by Dwight's antics. Jim, however, announces he is leaving the party early to arrive in Philadelphia for his sports marketing job. In response, Dwight repeatedly hits Jim with his switch and leaves the party angrily, after which a "normal" Christmas party is started. Although Pam tries to cheer him up, she too is saddened by Jim's absence. Jim returns later, having discovered that there is a 5 a.m. bus the next morning, and both Dwight and Pam are delighted by his return. During the party, Darryl Philbin fears that Jim has forgotten to include him in the new job in Philadelphia, and gets extremely drunk. When he goes to confront Jim, Jim—not knowing that Darryl was upset—excitedly tells him that he has arranged an interview for him. Darryl, appeased, turns around but passes out and crashes down on the catering table.

Pete Miller teaches Erin Hannon about his favorite movie, Die Hard, and attempts to recite all the dialogue from memory while an impressed Erin checks his accuracy using an online transcript. Andy Bernard, who is still away in the Caribbean after sailing his family's boat, emails Erin and says that he is going to stay for a few weeks. Hurt, Erin decides to watch Die Hard with Pete rather than just hear him quote it. While watching the movie, Erin begins to cry as she starts doubting Andy's commitment to her and Pete tries to comfort her by placing his arm around her, which she accepts. Toby Flenderson tells Nellie Bertram about the Scranton Strangler case he was on. After boring her for what is implied to be several hours, she hushes him and gently kisses him to make him stop talking. Toby passionately kisses her back, and she reciprocates.

== Production ==
"Dwight Christmas" was written by executive story editor Robert Padnick, marking his fourth writing credit for the series after joining the writing staff in the seventh season. It was directed by Charles McDougall, his first directing credit for the season. McDougal's first job for the series was directing its first Christmas episode during the show's second season. The basic plot of the episode, involving Belsnickel, had originally been conceived during the writing for the fourth season and was going to air as that year's Christmas installment. However, the 2007–08 Writers Guild of America strike halted production, and the unfinished script was never used. According to executive producer and showrunner Greg Daniels, the writing staff wanted to use the premise for many years, but could never find a right time to implement it, until an opportunity during the show's last season presented itself. Before the episode aired, Kemper said in an interview with TV Guide that "I feel like I might be expected to say this because it is the last one, but I truly love this episode so much" and that she "specifically love[s] Dwight's storyline" because "he brings in his family Christmas traditions. I've always held Dwight as one of my favorite characters and now 'Dwight Christmas' just takes it to a new level." Fischer said that filming the last Christmas episode was "emotional" and regretted not being able to have Mindy Kaling, who portrayed Kelly Kapoor on the series, film a karaoke scene. This is the second episode of season nine to not feature Andy or Clark. Ed Helms, who portrayed Andy, left the show temporarily in the season's sixth episode "The Boat" in order to film The Hangover Part III, whereas Clark Duke, who portrayed Clark, left for a few episodes to film Kick-Ass 2.

On June 26, 2020, it was announced that a scene where the character Nate Nickerson appeared in blackface as the mythical personage Zwarte Piet was removed from the episode in light of the George Floyd protests.

== Cultural references ==
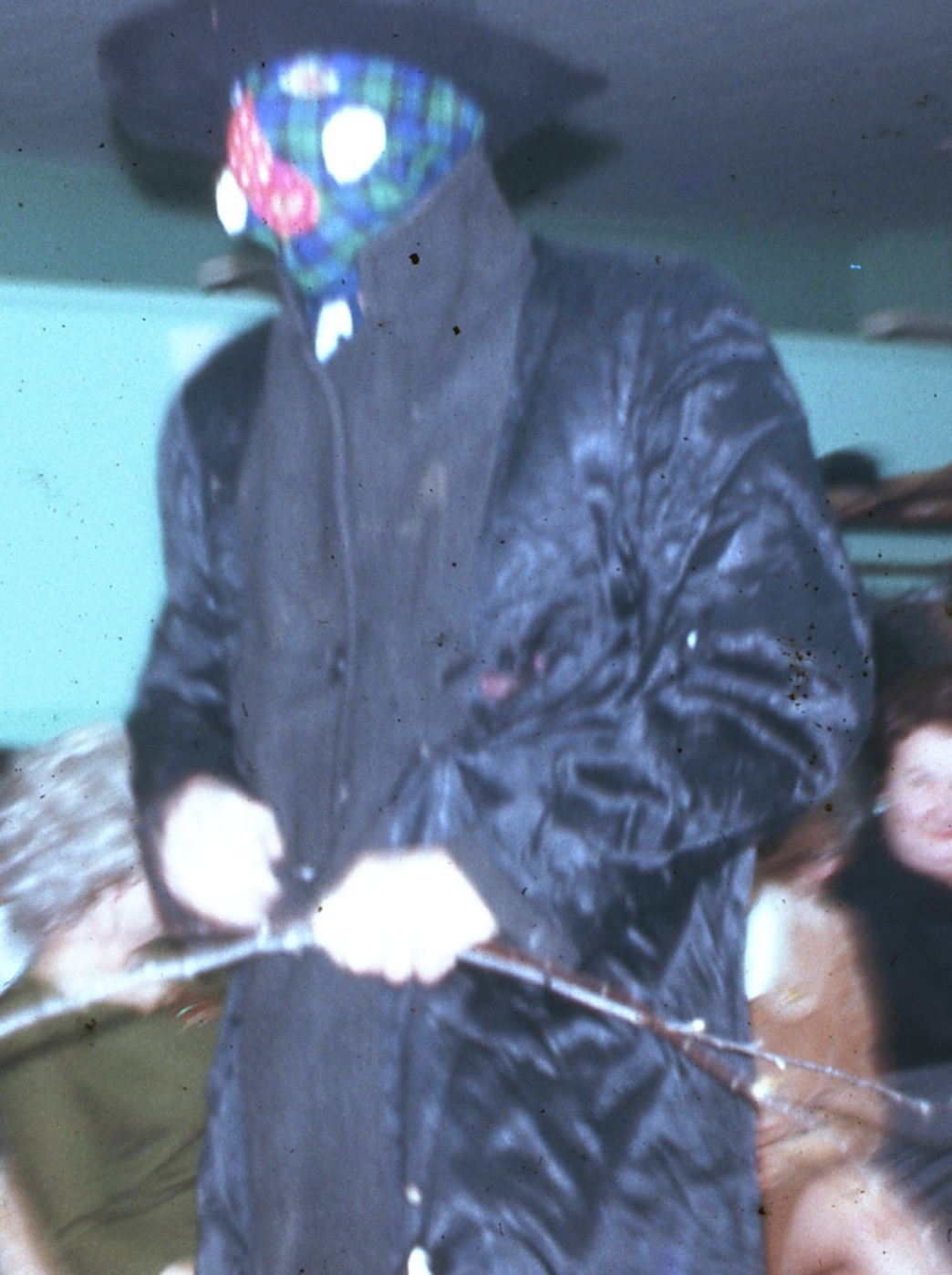
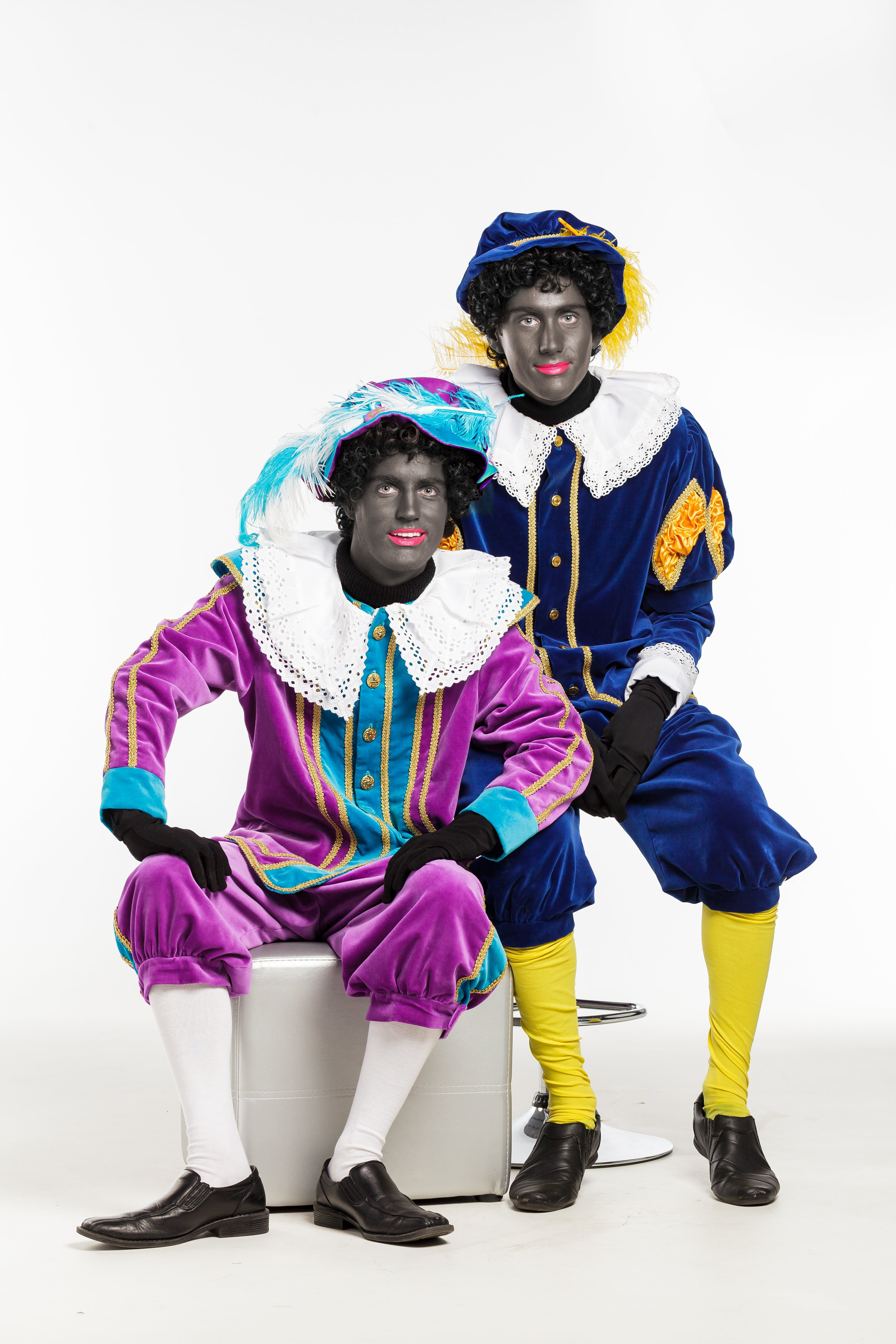
Dwight dresses up as the character Belsnickel (left) and has Nate dress up as Zwarte Piet (right). (The scene featuring Zwarte Piet was edited out of the episode in June 2020.)

Dwight, who dresses up as Belsnickel, has one of the warehouse workers, Nate, dress up as Belsnickel's assistant, Zwarte Piet, before the office vetoes the idea, feeling that it is racist. (In June 2020, the scene featuring Zwarte Piet was removed from Netflix in response to nationwide protests following the murder of George Floyd). Dwight presents the camera with a picture of him and his brother celebrating Christmas, and a version of the same photo decorated in the style of the 1999 science fiction film The Matrix. When Jim is trying to convince the office to do Dwight's idea, he mispronounces one of the German character's names, calling him "Hufflepuff", one of the four houses of the magical school Hogwarts from the book series Harry Potter by J.K. Rowling. Creed Bratton (a fictionalized version of the actual Creed Bratton) mentions that, for this years party, he wants a "Tapas Swiss Miss"-themed party, which is a combination of Spanish tapas and Swiss Miss hot cocoa. Andy, via email, tells Erin that he saw the 2012 movie Life of Pi, an adaptation of the book of the same name. He also notes that he wants to see the first part of Peter Jackson's 2012 film The Hobbit: An Unexpected Journey. Pete and Kevin make several references to the film Die Hard by quoting lines from the movie, with Erin and Pete eventually watching the movie.

== Reception ==
=== Ratings ===
"Dwight Christmas" aired on NBC on December 6, 2012. In its original American broadcast, the episode was viewed by 4.16 million viewers and received a 2.1 rating/6% share among adults between the ages of 18 and 49. This means that it was seen by 2.1 percent of all 18- to 49-year-olds, and 6 percent of all 18- to 49-year-olds watching television at the time of the broadcast. The Office ranked fourth in its timeslot, being beaten by an episode of the ABC series Grey's Anatomy which received a 3.0/8% rating, an entry of the CBS series Person of Interest which received a 2.9/8%, and an installment of the Fox program Glee, which earned a 2.2/6% rating. In addition, The Office was the highest-rated NBC television program. The episode ranked number one in its timeslot for men aged 18–34.

=== Critical reception ===
The episode received largely positive reviews from television critics. Andrea Reiher of Zap2it named "Dwight Christmas" the best comedy TV episode of 2012. She wrote that the episode "was not only funny but had a huge nostalgia factor", and continued the show's trend of strong holiday episodes. Reiher also praised the episode's two subplots, writing that "drunk Darryl and Die Hard" helped produce "a classic episode of The Office that brought back the warm and fuzzy feelings of the early seasons of the show."

Bonnie Stiernberg of Paste awarded the episode an 8 out of 10. Although she noted that Erin and Pete's subplot "could've easily been ripped from the season two Jim-Pam-Roy storyline", she concluded that "The Office successfully found a way to make its final Christmas count." Damon Houx of Screen Crush called the episode "a really good Christmas episode" that "got [the] central three characters absolutely right". Although he wrote that the show was missing several cast members, like Helms and Duke, it was "as good as the post-Carell Office has been". Cindy White of IGN awarded the episode a 9 out of 10, denoting an "amazing episode". She wrote that it "harkens back to forgotten holiday traditions of old, like good Christmas episodes of The Office". She also concluded that "the nostalgia swirling around Dwight Christmas was particularly noticeable" which she deduced was probably "a conscious effort here on the part of the writers to recapture that old Office magic and make this one to remember, and I think that effort paid off."

Brett Davinger of the California Literary Review wrote that, while the episode's plot was "not particularly notable" on the surface, it manages to work "because of Rainn Wilson's commitment to it". Furthermore, he wrote that the episode concluded the first half of the season in a "respectable and respectful" manner. Dan Forcella of TV Fanatic awarded the episode four-and-a-half stars out of five and called it "a worthy extension of [The Office Christmas] tradition" and "definitely one of the best episodes of this final season". He praised Dwight's antics as well as Kevin's humorous lines. Michael Tedder of Vulture awarded the episode four stars out of five and wrote that "part of the charm of this episode was that the writers didn't try to stuff it with too much plot". One of the very few mixed reviews was written by Caroline Framke of The A.V. Club, who awarded the episode a "B−" and argued that "Dwight Christmas" was trying too hard to replicate the humor of the second-season episode "Christmas Party". She concluded that the episode "ranks as more impish than admirable."
