= George Floyd protests in the Netherlands =

2020 protests in the Netherlands against police brutality

- Part of George Floyd protests
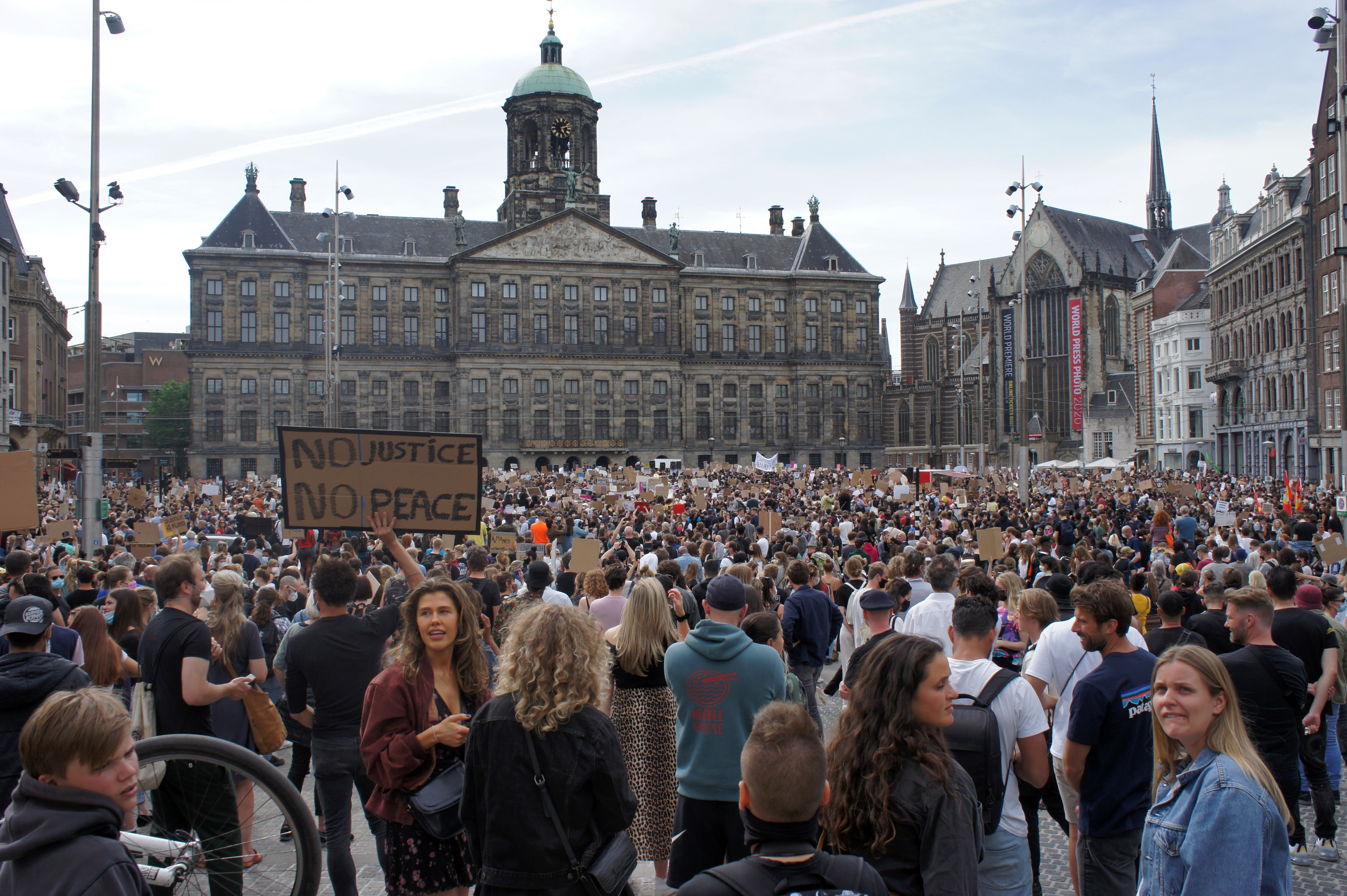
- People protesting at Dam Square in Amsterdam
- Date: 1 June 2020 – 12 July 2020 (1 month, 1 week and 4 days)
- Location: The Netherlands
- Caused by: Police brutality; Institutional racism; Zwarte Piet controversy; Reaction to the murder of George Floyd

Cities in the Netherlands in which a protest with about 100 or more participants was held

The murder of George Floyd, a Black American man, by a white police officer, Derek Chauvin, during an arrest in Minneapolis, Minnesota on May 25, 2020, sparked large-scale protests against systemic racism, both in the United States and elsewhere. People in the Netherlands protested to show solidarity with Americans and to demonstrate against issues with police or racism. Vigils and protests of up to thousands of participants took place nationwide.

== Reactions ==
=== Political ===
On 4 June, during a press conference about whether the Dutch could go on foreign holiday that year, Prime Minister Mark Rutte called the murder of George Floyd "unacceptable". Rutte also commented on the recent George Floyd protests in the Netherlands, saying that racism is not only an American and that racism in the Netherlands is a "systemic problem". He also said to have changed his mind about Zwarte Piet.

On 25 June, Mark Rutte, together with Deputy Prime Minister Kajsa Ollongren and Minister of Justice and Security Ferdinand Grapperhaus, invited several protesters at the Catshuis to discuss racism in the Netherlands and the recent demonstrations. This sparked some criticism, because lead figures of the Dutch antiracist movement, including organisers and spokespeople of organisations such as Black Lives Matter and Kick Out Zwarte Piet, were not invited. However, Rutte stated that a follow-up conversation with spokespersons and leaders of the movement would be organised in the future. This happened on 2 September, when representatives of Black Lives Matter and Kick Out Zwarte Piet were invited after all. They talked about how combat racism in different areas and how to address to issue of racism in the Netherlands. Minister of Social Affairs and Employment Wouter Koolmees joined the conversation as well. After the conversation, Rutte said he wants to "take practical steps towards zero racism", especially in the areas of health care, housing, education and employment. Rutte also said he wants to talk to more organisations together with the members of his cabinet at the end of the month about sectors where discrimination still causes problems. However, there was no third meeting.

After the two meetings at the Catshuis, Ollongren met with Black Lives Matter activists in Amsterdam-Zuidoost on 9 September to discuss the economic inequality in that area.

=== Public ===
A representative research by Hart van Nederland in early June, in which 3,066 people took, part suggests that 49% of the Dutch population supports the Black Lives Matter movement, opposed to 46% who don't support the movement. A survey in mid-June among 7,053 people by LINDA, consisting mostly of women (93%), suggested that 75.8% of the Dutch supported the protests that took place, opposed to 24.2% who did not.

Several Dutch celebrities showed their support for the protests and the Black Lives Matter movement, including Glennis Grace, Doutzen Kroes, Georgina Verbaan, Glen Faria (nl), Halina Reijn, Anna Nooshin (nl), Memphis Depay, Hadewych Minis, Pepijn Lanen (nl), Famke Louise, Meral Polat (nl), Nikkie de Jager, Nicolette van Dam, Jandino Asporaat and Patty Brard.

== Timeline ==
=== 1 June ===
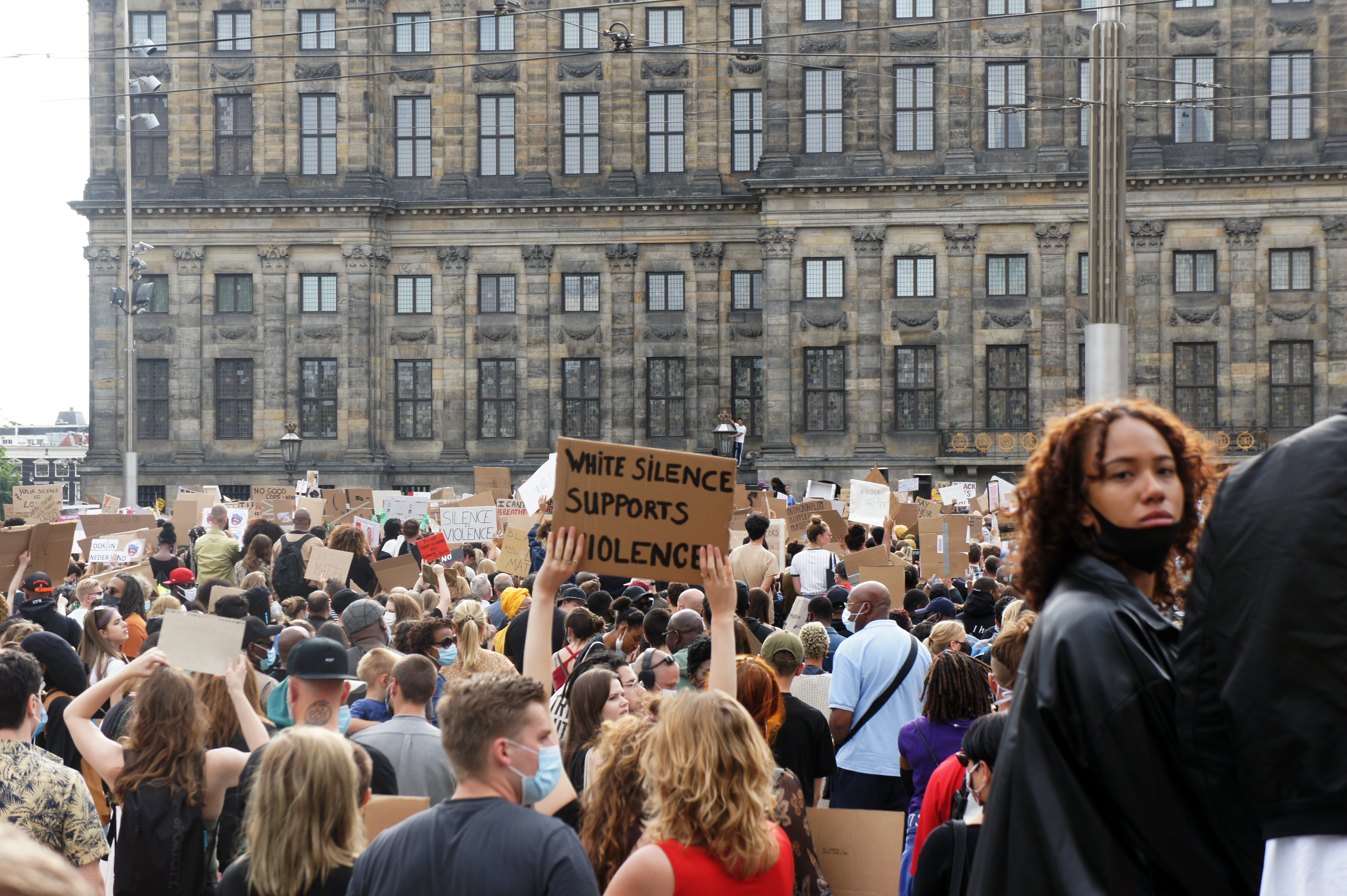
Protest in Amsterdam on 1 June

- Amsterdam: Over 5,000 people protested against police brutality in the United States and Europe. Attendance was far higher than expected, and some even speculated that up to 10,000 people attended the protest.
- Breda: Dozens of people protested in the city of Breda.
- Maastricht: Hundreds of people attended a Black Lives Matter demonstration in Maastricht.

=== 2 June ===
- Groningen: Between 800 and 1,500 people protested against police brutality in the United States and Europe.
- The Hague: Around 1,500 people gathered on the Malieveld to protest against police brutality in the United States and Europe.

=== 3 June ===
- Rotterdam: Thousands of people gathered in Rotterdam to protest racism and police brutality.

=== 4 June ===
- Arnhem: About a thousand people showed up on the Grote Markt in Arnhem.

=== 5 June ===
- Enschede: 500 people protested in solidarity with the Black Lives Matter Movement in Enschede.
- Nijmegen: A protest was held in Goffertpark in Nijmegen in solidarity with the Black Lives Matter movement. According to the local authorities, 850 people were present, while the organisation claims there were 2,500 people. An air photo of the protest shows over 1,000 people.
- Utrecht: About 3,500 people protested in Utrecht in solidarity with the Black Lives Matter movement.
- Weert: About 20 people demonstrated against racism in Weert.

=== 6 June ===
- Eindhoven: 1,700 people gathered at the Stadhuisplein in Eindhoven. They all held a moment of silence for the victims of police brutality before protesting.
- Tilburg: A thousand people protested in Tilburg against racism and police brutality.

=== 7 June ===
- Maastricht: 1,400 people protested peacefully for the second time in Maastricht, this time in Griendpark.
- Zwolle: At least a thousand people protested in Zwolle at the Wezenlanden park.

=== 8 June ===
- Bergen op Zoom: Two anonymous people started protesting on the Grote Markt in Bergen op Zoom every Friday, starting on June 8.
- Middelburg: 800 people in Middelburg held a sit-in while hundreds of other protesters demonstrated elsewhere in the city. 500 people 'attended' the protest online.

=== 10 June ===
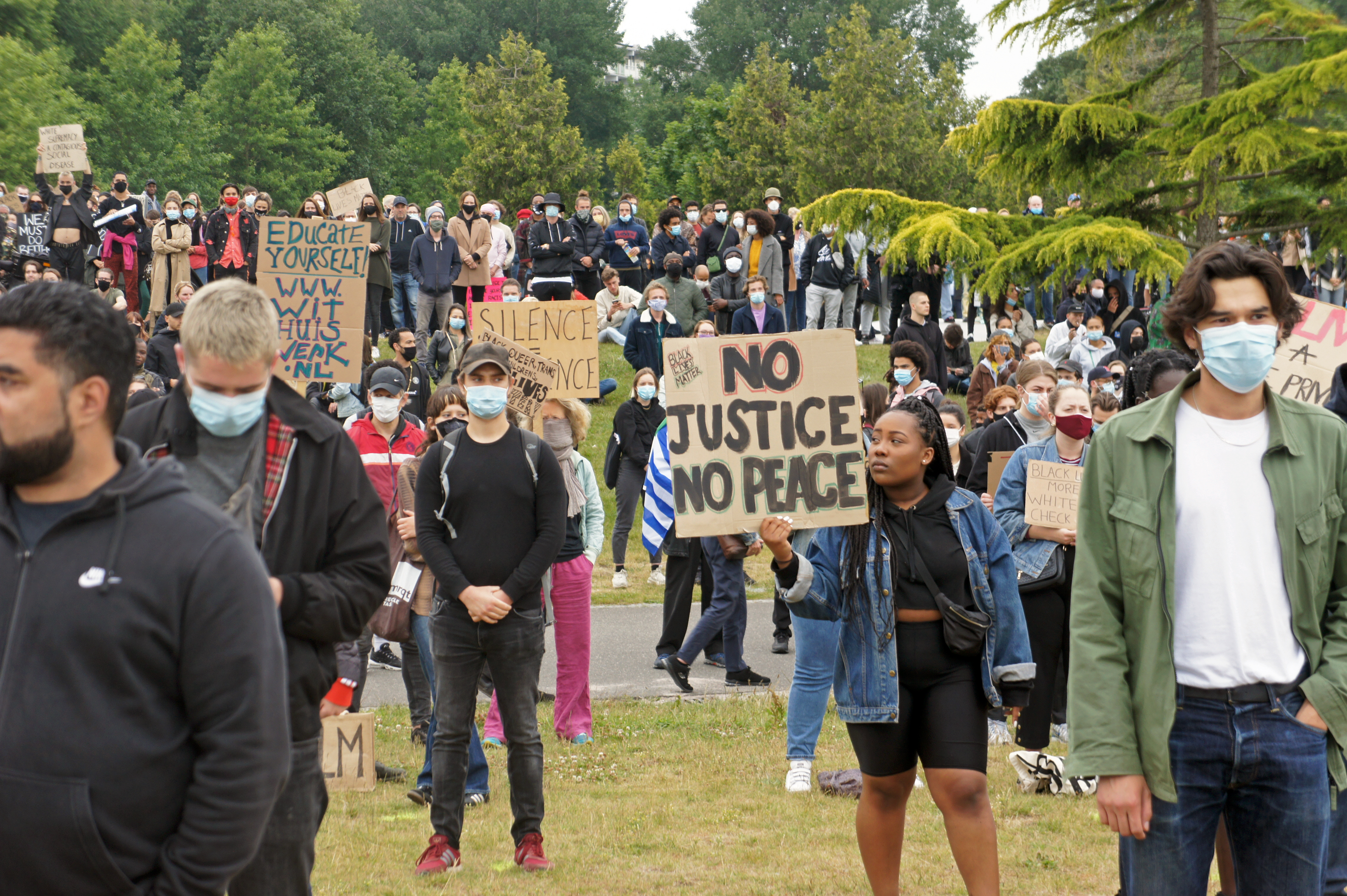
Protest in Amsterdam on 10 June

- Amsterdam: 11,500 of protesters gathered again in Amsterdam, this time at the Nelson Mandelapark.

=== 11 June ===
- Dronten: Over 100 people demonstrated in solidarity with the Black Lives Matter movement at the Meerpaalplein in Dronten.

=== 12 June ===
- Amsterdam: An "estafette-demonstratie" (relay demonstration) began in Amsterdam. Every day from 9am to 5pm a single picket demonstration takes place, with a new protester every hour. The protest was supported online with the hashtag "#zolanghetnodigis" (#aslongasittakes).
- Lelystad: About 250 people protested at a Black Lives Matter demonstration at the Agorahof in Lelystad.

=== 13 June ===
- 's-Hertogenbosch: About 1,000 protested at a Black Lives Matter protest in Den Bosch.
- Breda: 1,500 people attended a Black Lives Matter protest in Breda.
- Leeuwarden: Between 2,000 and 2,500 people attended a Black Lives Matter protest in Leeuwarden.

=== 14 June ===
- Alkmaar: Between 750 and 1,000 people protested in Alkmaar.
- Almere: Between 2,600 and 3,000 people protested in Almere.
- Deventer: About 1,100 people protested in Deventer.
- Leiden: More than 2,500 people protested in Leiden.
- Wageningen: 1,026 people went to a Black Lives Matter demonstration at Park Noordwest in Wageningen.

=== 15 June ===
- Apeldoorn: Over 550 people protested in Apeldoorn.

=== 17 June ===
- Haarlem: About 2,000 people gathered in the Haarlemmerhout to peacefully protest racism.
- Purmerend: Over 250 people protested in Purmerend.

=== 19 June ===
- Hoorn: Approximately 250 protesters demonstrated against the statue of Jan Pieterszoon Coen. This eventually emerged in riots, where at least five people were arrested.
- Nijmegen: Another "estafette-demonstratie" started taking place in Nijmegen, in a similar fashion as the demonstration that started in Amsterdam on 12 June.
- Zutphen: 285 people demonstrated in Zutphen against racism.

=== 20 June ===
- The Hague: A few hundred people protested on the Malieveld against a new law giving police more authorisation for the use of violence.
- Heerlen: About 60 people protested in Heerlen.

=== 21 June ===
- Emmen: Approximately 200 people protested against racism in Emmen.

=== 25 June ===
- Diemen: Several primary school pupils and some adults held a small protest in Diemen.

=== 27 June ===
- Heerlen: Over 200 people protested against racism in Heerlen.

=== 11 July ===
- Ede: Over 100 people demonstrated against racism in Ede.

=== 12 July ===
- Dordrecht: About 250 people protested in Dordrecht.
