= Père Fouettard =

Companion of Saint Nicholas in folklore

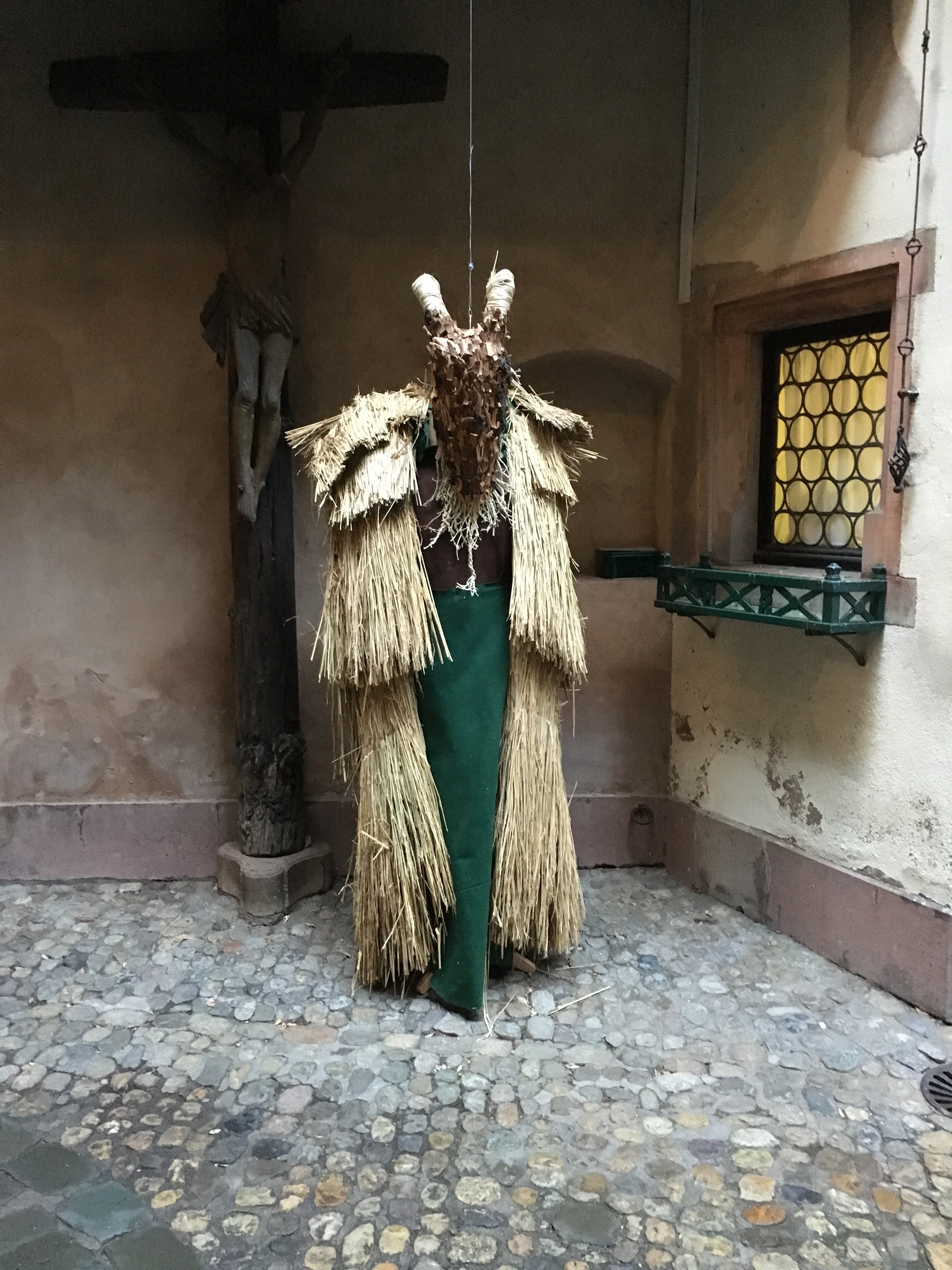
- A statue of Père Fouettard
- Alias: Hans Trapp
- Gender: Male
- Occupation: Delivering punishments to naughty children on Christmas

Père Fouettard (French for 'Father Whipper' / 'Old Man Whipper'; pronounced [pɛʁ fwɛtaʁ]) is a character who accompanies Saint Nicholas on his rounds during Saint Nicholas Day (6 December) dispensing lumps of coal or beatings to naughty children while Saint Nicholas gives gifts to the well behaved. He is known mainly in the far north and eastern regions of France, in the south of Belgium, and in French-speaking Switzerland, although similar characters exist all over Europe (see Companions of Saint Nicholas). This "Happy Father" was said to bring a whip with him to spank all of the naughty children who misbehaved.

== Origin ==
The most popular story about the origin of the character was first told around the year 1252. Père Fouettard was an innkeeper (or a butcher in other versions). He captured three boys, who appeared to be wealthy and on their way to a religious boarding school. He and his wife killed the children in order to rob them. One gruesome version tells that they drugged the children, slit their throats, cut them into pieces, and stewed them in a barrel. Saint Nicholas discovered the crime and resurrected the children. Père Fouettard repented and became Saint Nicholas' partner. A slightly different version of this story claims that Saint Nicholas forced Père Fouettard to become his assistant as a punishment for his crimes.

Another story states that during the Siege of Metz (a city in Eastern France) in 1552, an effigy of king Charles V was burned and dragged through the city. Meanwhile, an association of tanners created a grotesque character (also a tanner) armed with a whip and bound in chains, who punished children. After Metz was liberated, the charred effigy of Charles V and the tanner character somehow combined into what is now known as Père Fouettard. Events surrounding the city's liberation and the burning of the effigy coincided with the passage of Saint Nicholas, hence Père Fouettard became his "bad cop" counterpart.

In the 1930s, Père Fouettard appeared in the United States under the translated name Father Flog or Spanky. Although almost identical to the original French personification, Father Flog had nothing to do with Christmas and also had a female accomplice named Mother Flog. The two doled out specific punishments for specific childhood crimes (e.g. cutting out the tongue for lying).

== Appearance ==
The most common depiction of Père Fouettard is of a man with a sinister face dressed in dark robes with scraggly unkempt hair and a long beard. He is armed with a whip, a large stick, or bundles of switches. Some incarnations of the character have him wearing a wicker backpack in which children can be placed and carried away. Sometimes, he merely carries a large bundle of sticks on his back.

== Père Fouettard in popular culture ==
- Jacques Dutronc's song La Fille du père Noël (The daughter of Father Christmas) is about Père Fouettard's son having a crush on Santa Claus' daughter.
- Another French pop star, Alain DeLorme, mentioned him in the song "Venez Venez St. Nicolas"
- There is a restaurant named Le Père Fouettard at 9 Rue Pierre Lescot, in Paris which features "Classic Parisian Fare".
- Robert Schumann composed a piano piece in 1848 most commonly known as Knecht Ruprecht (a similar character, see Companions of Saint Nicholas), but in some cases the piece is called Le Père Fouettard.
- Black Phoenix Alchemy Lab, a line of hand-blended perfume oils, created a limited-edition Yule scent in 2008 named Le Père Fouettard consisting of "Whip leather, coal dust, gaufrette, and black licorice."
- Père Fouettard (renamed "Gruzzlebeard" in the English translation) was the main antagonist in the animated show The Secret World of Santa Claus.
- In the 2023 Hallmark Channel original film "Joyeux Noel", the character of Mark played by Brant Daugherty is playfully attacked by French children who call him Père Fouettard.
- In the 2024 Season 4, episode six episode of Emily in Paris, the legend of Le Père Fouettard is explained.

== See also ==
- Befana
- Belsnickel
- Krampus
- Zwarte Piet - A similar figure from Dutch folklore
- Hans von Trotha, a German knight of the 15th Century who has been transformed in folklore into a similar figure known as Hans Trapp in the Alsace region
