= Belsnickel =

German Christmas gift-bringer

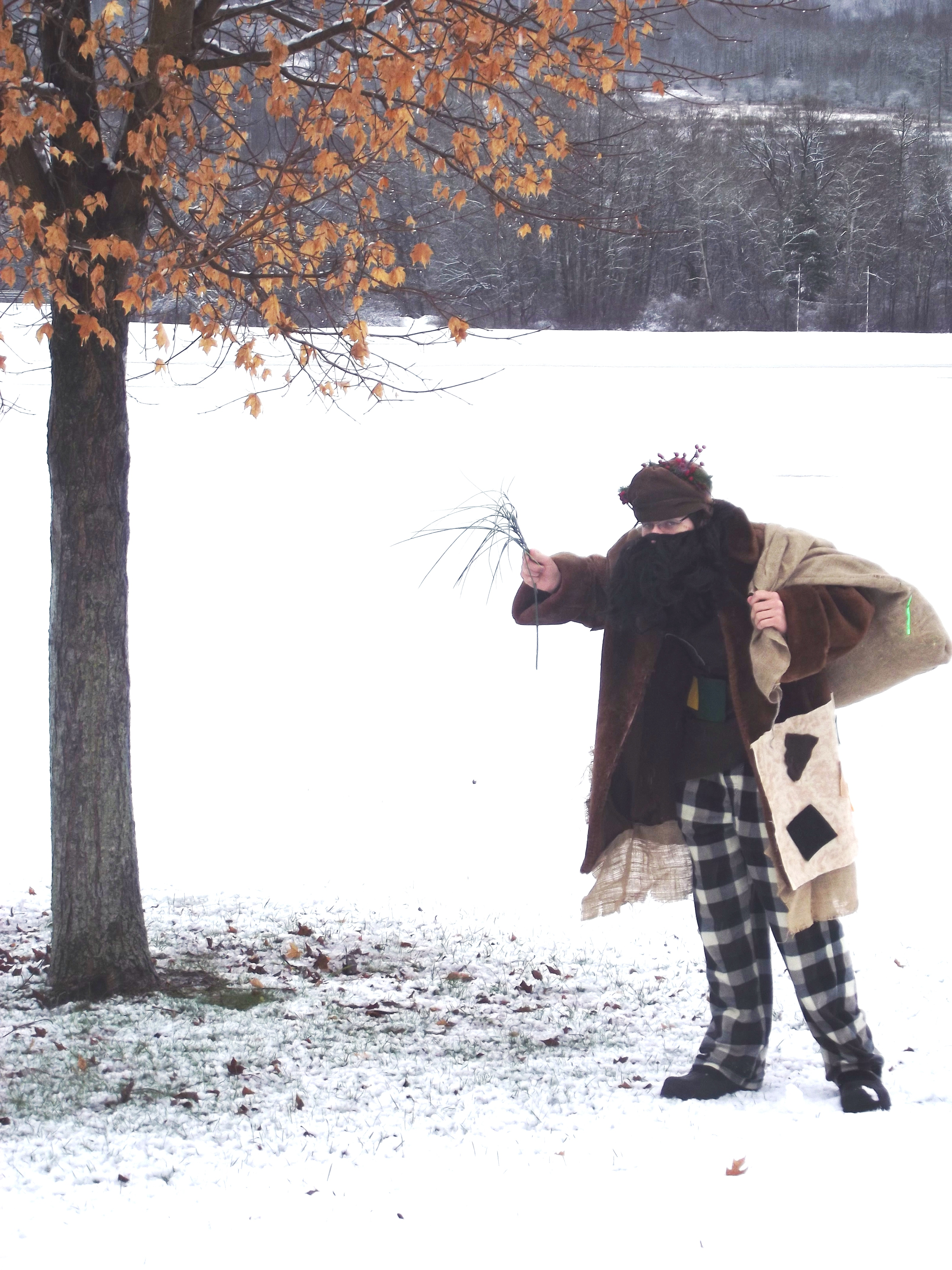
- Man dressed as a modern Belsnickel in his travel attire on his way to scare children in the schools in Norwich, New York. December 2012.
- Aliases: Belschnickel; Belznickle; Belznickel; Pelznikel; Pelznickel; Bell; Sniggle
- Gender: Male
- Occupation: Delivering punishments to naughty children on Christmas

Belsnickel (also known as Belschnickel, Belznickle, Belznickel, Pelznikel, Pelznickel, Bell Sniggle) is a crotchety, fur-clad Christmas gift-bringer figure in the folklore of the Palatinate region of southwestern Germany along the Rhine, the Saarland, and the Odenwald area of Baden-Württemberg. The figure is also preserved in Pennsylvania Dutch communities and Brazilian-German communities.

== Cultural perspective ==
Belsnickel is related to other companions of Saint Nicholas in the folklore of German-speaking Europe. He may have been based on an older German myth, Knecht Ruprecht, a servant of Saint Nicholas and a character from northern Germany. Unlike those figures, Belsnickel does not accompany Saint Nicholas but instead visits alone and combines both the threatening and the benign aspects which in other traditions are divided between the Saint Nicholas and the companion figure.

Belsnickel is a man wearing fur. He is typically very ragged and disheveled. He wears torn, tattered, and dirty clothes, and he carries a switch in his hand with which to beat naughty children, but also pockets full of cakes, candies, and nuts for good children.

A first-hand 19th-century account of the "Beltznickle" tradition in Allegany County, Maryland, can be found in Brown's Miscellaneous Writings, a collection of essays by Jacob Brown (born 1824). Writing of a period around 1830, Brown says, "we did not hear of" Santa Claus. Instead, the tradition called for a visit by a different character altogether:

He was known as Kriskinkle, Beltznickle and sometimes as the Christmas woman. Children then not only saw the mysterious person, but felt him or rather his stripes upon their backs with his switch. The annual visitor would make his appearance some hours after dark, thoroughly disguised, especially the face, which would sometimes be covered with a hideously ugly phiz - generally wore a female garb - hence the name Christmas woman - sometimes it would be a veritable woman but with masculine force and action. He or she would be equipped with an ample sack about the shoulders filled with cakes, nuts, and fruits, and a long hazel switch which was supposed to have some kind of a charm in it as well as a sting. One hand would scatter the goodies upon the floor, and then the scramble would begin by the delighted children, and the other hand would ply the switch upon the backs of the excited youngsters - who would not show a wince, but had it been parental discipline there would have been screams to reach a long distance.

=== Outside Europe ===
The Belsnickel character originated in the Palatinate. When people immigrated to Pennsylvania, they brought their German traditions with them. Belsnickel was known in Pennsylvania in the early 1800s. Amongst the Pennsylvania Germans, Belsnickel is the character who visits homes prior to Christmas to check up on the behavior of the children. The traditional Belsnickel showed up at houses 1–2 weeks before Christmas and "often created fright because he always knew exactly which of the children misbehaved". He would rap on the door or window with his stick and often the children would have to answer a question for him or sing some type of song. In exchange he would toss candies onto the floor. If the children jumped too quick for the treats, they may end up getting struck with Belsnickel's switch.

An 1853 article in a British magazine describing Pennsylvanian customs refers to "Pelsnichol, or Nicholas with the fur, alluding to the dress of skins in which he is said to be clad. Some make Pelsnichol identical with Krishkinkle, but the more general opinion is that they are two personages, one the rewarder of the good, the other the punisher of the bad." According to this article, Pelsnichol merely leaves a birch rod in the stockings of naughty children.

There are two versions of Belsnickel, the rural and the urban characters. Both are described in the book, Christmas in Pennsylvania: a folk cultural study, by Alfred L. Shoemaker and Don Yoder. The tradition fell into decline toward the end of the nineteenth century, but has seen a revival in recent years.

The tradition of Belsnickel was brought to Indiana by immigrants from the Palatinate. His garb could vary from one locality to another. He might wear a long, black or brown coat or robe, held together at the waist with a rope, and a fur cap or bear skin hat, decorated with bells. In this branch of the tradition, the father or other older male relative was often "busy working outside" or had to see to some matter elsewhere in the house when Pelznickel (or Belsnickel) arrived. "Belsnickling" or "Klausentreiben," was the "running" of groups of young men or youth dressed in false faces and fantastic costumes on "Belsnickle Night", the eve of the Feast of St. Nicholas (St. Nikolaustag), and was the occasion of good-natured boisterousness. Young men, dressed in skins and furs, would move through the streets of town or village, rattling chains and bells.

The tradition also exists in parts of Newfoundland (see mummering), Nova Scotia, and some communities in the Brazilian state of Santa Catarina.

== In popular culture ==
A writer to the letters column of The Times refers to an illustration of "Pelz-Nickel" in a book by English author Harriet Myrtle, The Little Sister (1851). German illustrator H.J. Schneider depicts him "in a long cloak, pointed hood, a fur round his neck, with a long white beard, and a big bag."

Stoudt's Brewing Company of Adamstown, Pennsylvania, brews a seasonal dark lager called "Belsnickle". Otto's Pub and Brewery of State College, Pennsylvania, brews a "Belsnickle" ale.

The antagonist of the 1941 John R. Neill book The Scalawagons of Oz, the thirty-fifth entry in the Oz series created by L. Frank Baum, is a mysterious monstrosity called Bell-snickle. It first appears as "a large bluish-green object, flat as a buckwheat cake, and rolling along on its edge like a cartwheel." The creature does have arms and legs, as well as facial features; it wears bells on its ears, explaining at least one portion of its name. The creature has the egotism and petulance of a spoiled child.

In 2000, author Chet Williamson published Pennsylvania Dutch Night Before Christmas, a children's picture book that includes Belsnickel in a Pennsylvania Dutch version of "The Night Before Christmas".

In "Dwight Christmas", season nine episode nine of The Office, Dwight Schrute dresses as Belsnickel and spends a significant portion of the episode deciding if his co-workers were "impish or admirable" at the company Christmas party.

The 2020 Netflix film The Christmas Chronicles 2 features Belsnickel, played by actor Julian Dennison, as the movie's main antagonist. His goal in the movie is to destroy Christmas.

== Etymology ==
See Belsnickel § Etymology

== See also ==
- Krampus
- Le Père Fouettard
- Zwarte Piet
