= Zwarte Piet =

Saint Nicholas companion in Low Countries folklore

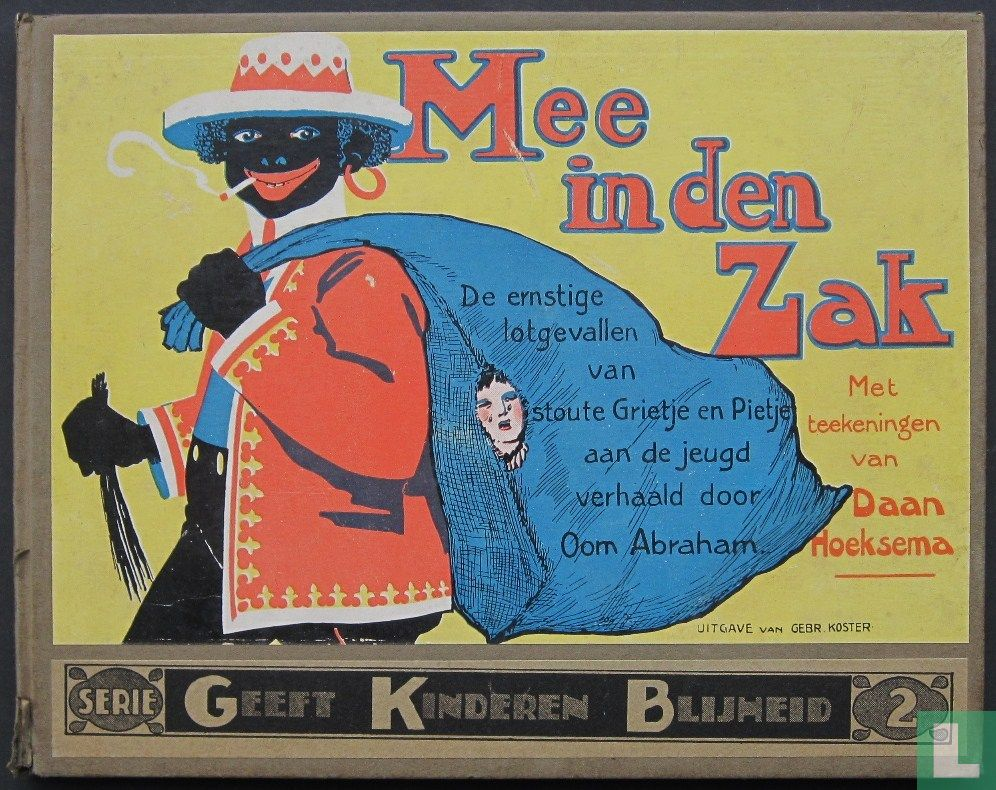
- A children's book from 1915, titled "In the Bag: the grave fate of naughty Grietje and Pietje", depicting Zwarte Piet and his bag with naughty children inside

Creature information
- Other name(s): Black Pete, Schwaarze Péiter, Swarte Pyt, Pit Hitam
- Similar entities: Krampus, Knecht Ruprecht, Belsnickel, Père Fouettard
- Folklore: Dutch

Origin
- Known for: being the companion of Sinterklaas
- Country: Netherlands, Belgium, Luxembourg, Curaçao, Aruba and Indonesia
- Region: Benelux and former Dutch colonies
- Habitat: Spain

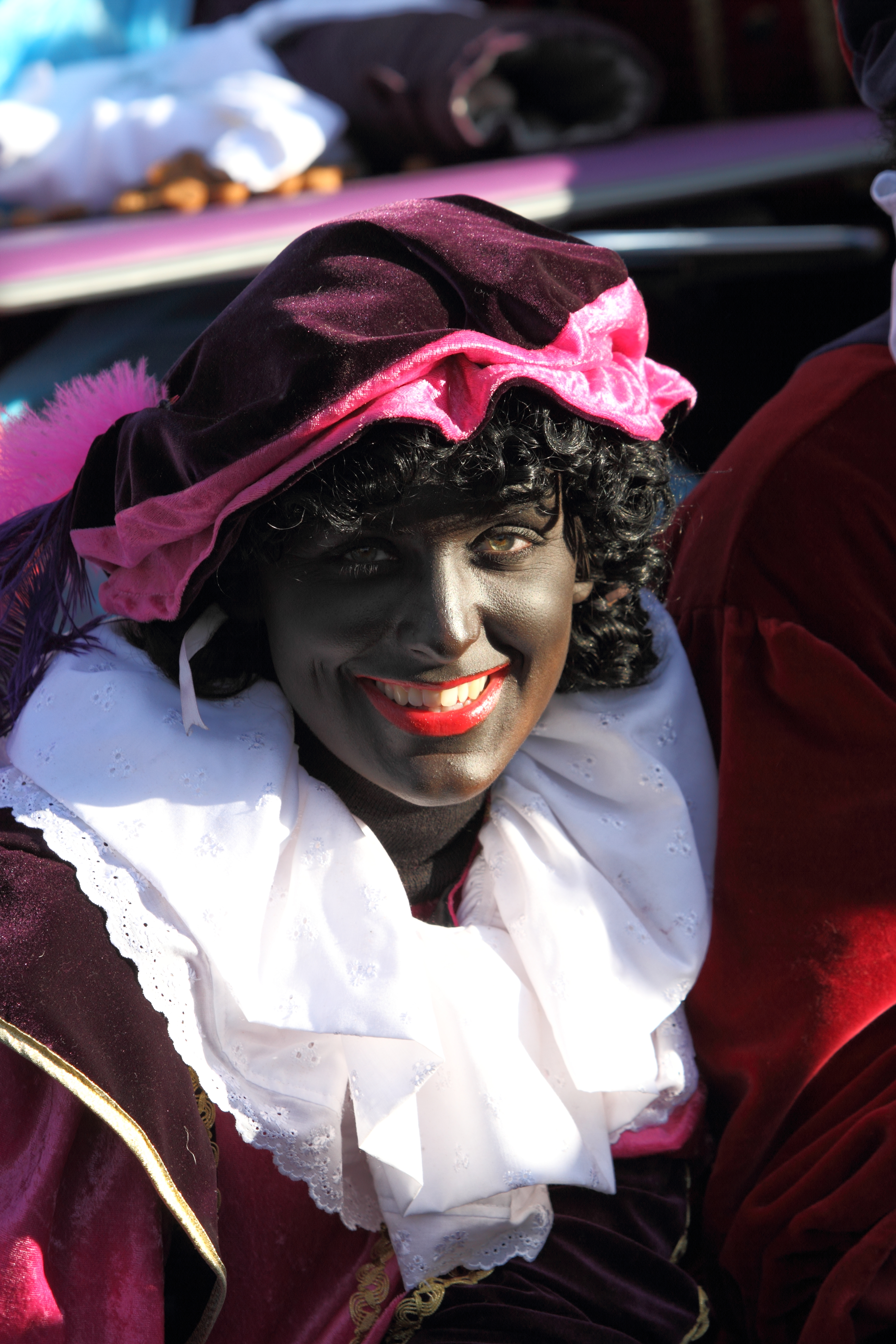
A person in a traditional Zwarte Piet costume

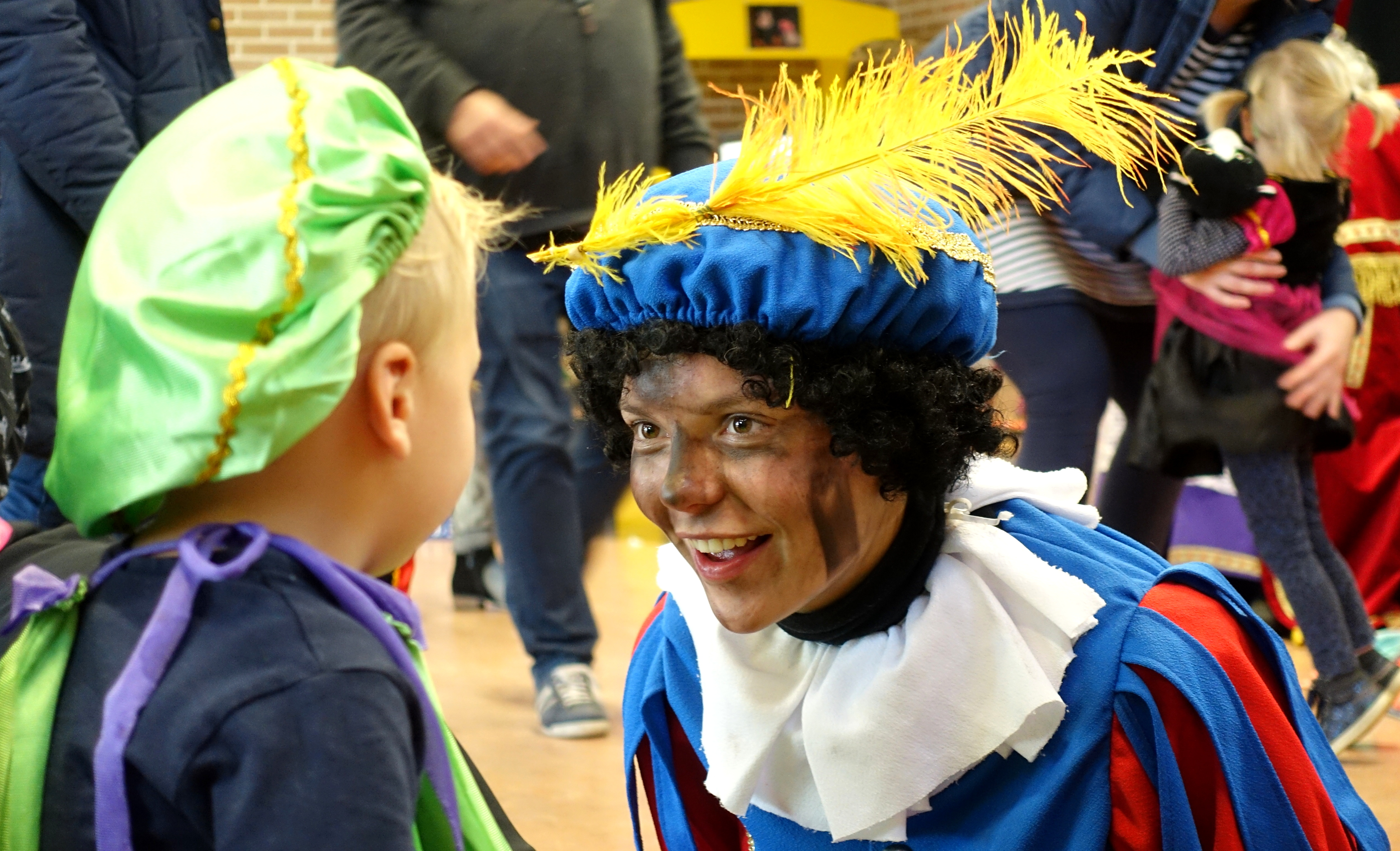
A person in a modernized Sooty Pete costume

Zwarte Piet (Dutch: [ˈzʋɑrtə ˈpit]; Luxembourgish: Schwaarze Péiter; West Frisian: Swarte Pyt; Indonesian: Pit Hitam, Sinterpit), also known in English by the translated name Black Pete, is a companion of Saint Nicholas (Dutch: Sinterklaas; French: Saint-Nicolas; West Frisian: Sinteklaas; Luxembourgish: Kleeschen) in the folklore of the Low Countries. Traditionally, Zwarte Piet serves as an assistant to the saint and distributes sweets and gifts to well-behaved children.

The depiction of Zwarte Piet has gone through several changes since the mid 19th century. The earliest known illustration of the character comes from an 1850 book by Amsterdam schoolteacher Jan Schenkman and portrays him as a black Moor. This became the dominant representation of Zwarte Piet throughout the 20th century. Those portraying the traditional version of the character, since deemed a racial stereotype, usually put on blackface and colourful Renaissance attire in addition to curly wigs and bright red lipstick.

This version of Zwarte Piet became increasingly controversial beginning in the late 20th century and throughout the years that followed. Alternatives later debuted, among them multicolored Piets. By 2021, a revised version, dubbed Sooty Pete (Dutch: Roetveegpiet), had become more common than the traditional variant at public events and in television specials, films, social media, and advertising. Sooty Piet features the natural skin tone of the actors playing the character with soot marks created by streaks of dark makeup on their faces.

== Traditions ==
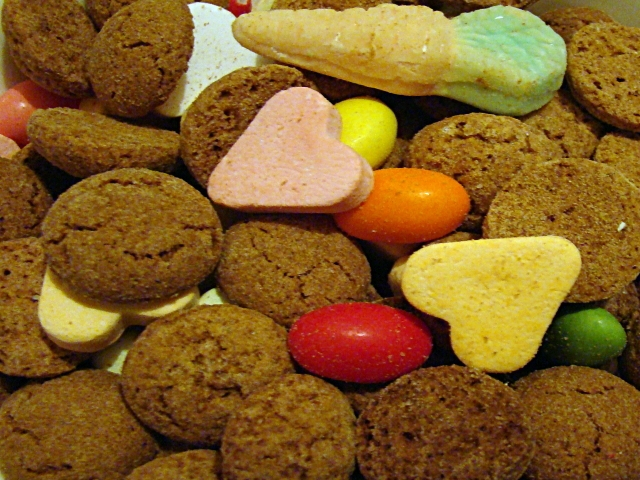
Strooigoed and kruidnoten mix for scattering

The Zwarte Piet character is part of the annual Feast of St. Nicholas that is celebrated on the evening of 5 December (Sinterklaasavond, which is known as Saint Nicholas' Eve in English) in the Netherlands, Bonaire, Curaçao and Aruba. This is when presents and sweets are traditionally distributed to children. The holiday is celebrated on 6 December in Belgium. The Zwarte Piet characters appear only in the weeks before the Feast of Saint Nicholas, first when the saint is welcomed with a parade as he arrives in the country (generally by boat, having traveled from Madrid, Spain). The tasks of the various Zwarte Piets (Zwarte Pieten in Dutch) are mostly to amuse children and to distribute kruidnoten and pepernoten in the Netherlands, tangerines and speculoos in Belgium, and other strooigoed (special Sinterklaas-themed sweets) to those who come to meet the saint as he visits schools, stores, and other places.

== History ==
=== Origins ===
According to Hélène Adeline Guerber and other historians, the origin of Sinterklaas and his helpers have been linked by some to the Wild Hunt of Odin. While riding the white horse Sleipnir, he flew through the air as the leader of the Wild Hunt. He was always accompanied by two black ravens, Huginn and Muninn. These helpers would listen, just like Zwarte Piet, at the chimneys of the homes they visited to tell Odin about the good and bad behavior of the mortals below.

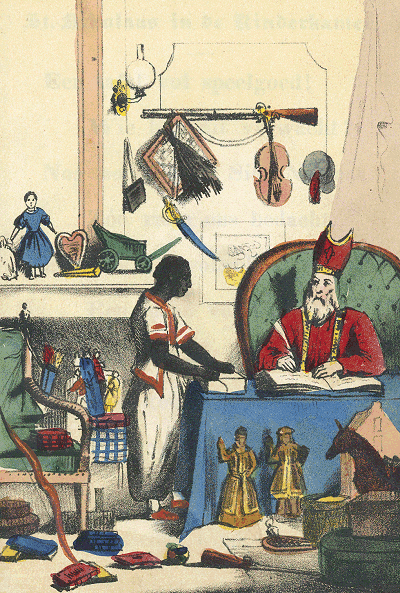
Illustration from Jan Schenkman's 1850 book Saint Nicholas and his servant

The Saint Nicholas tradition contains a number of elements that are not ecclesiastical in origin. In medieval iconography, Saint Nicholas is sometimes presented as taming a chained demon, who may or may not be black. However, no hint of a companion, demon, servant, or any other human or human-like fixed companion to the Saint is found in visual and textual sources from the Netherlands from the 16th until the 19th century. According to a long-standing theory first proposed by Karl Meisen, Zwarte Piet and his equivalents in Germanic Europe were originally presented as one or more enslaved demons forced to assist their captor. These chained and fire-scorched demons may have been redeveloped as black-skinned humans during the early 19th-century in the Netherlands in the likeness of Moors who work as servants for Saint Nicholas. Others believe Zwarte Piet to be a continuation of a custom in which people with blackface appeared in winter solstice rituals.

One or more demons working as helpers for the saint can still be found in various Austrian, German, Swiss, Hungarian, Czech, Slovak, and Polish Saint Nicholas traditions in the characters of Krampus, Père Fouettard, Schmutzli, Perchta, Knecht Ruprecht, Rubbels, Hanstrapp, Little Babushka, Pelzebock, Klaubauf, and Belsnickel. These companions of Saint Nicholas are often depicted as a group of closely related figures who accompany Saint Nicholas through the territories formerly controlled by the Holy Roman Empire. The characters act as foils to the benevolent gift-giver, or strict disciplinarians who threaten to thrash or abduct disobedient children. Mythologist Jacob Grimm associated the character with the pre-Christian spirit kobold, who could be either benevolent or malicious.

The introduction of Zwarte Piet did coincide, by and large, with a change in the depiction of the Sinterklaas character. Prior to this change, he was often quite strict toward poorly behaved children and often presented as a sort of bogeyman. Many of the terrifying characteristics that were later associated with Zwarte Piet were often attributed to him. The presentation of a holy man in this light was troubling for both teachers and priests. After the introduction of Zwarte Piet as Sinterklaas' servant, both characters adopted gentler personas.

The lyrics of older traditional Sinterklaas songs, still sung today, warn that Sinterklaas and his assistant will leave well-behaved children presents but punish those who have been naughty. They might even take very poorly behaved children to their homeland of Spain in burlap sacks where, according to legend, they'll be forced to assist them in their workshop for an entire season or longer. These songs and stories also warn that a child who has been only slightly naughty will receive a bundle of birch twigs or a lump of coal instead of gifts.

=== Development and depiction in the 19th and 20th centuries ===
In 1845, the Amsterdam-based primary school teacher Jan Schenkman published the book Sint Nikolaas en zijn Knecht (Saint Nicholas and his servant in English). It is considered the first time a servant character was included in a printed version of the Saint Nicholas narrative. The inaugural servant of Saint Nicolaas, 'Zwarte Piet', wears a costume which suggests membership to another culture or the dress of another land.

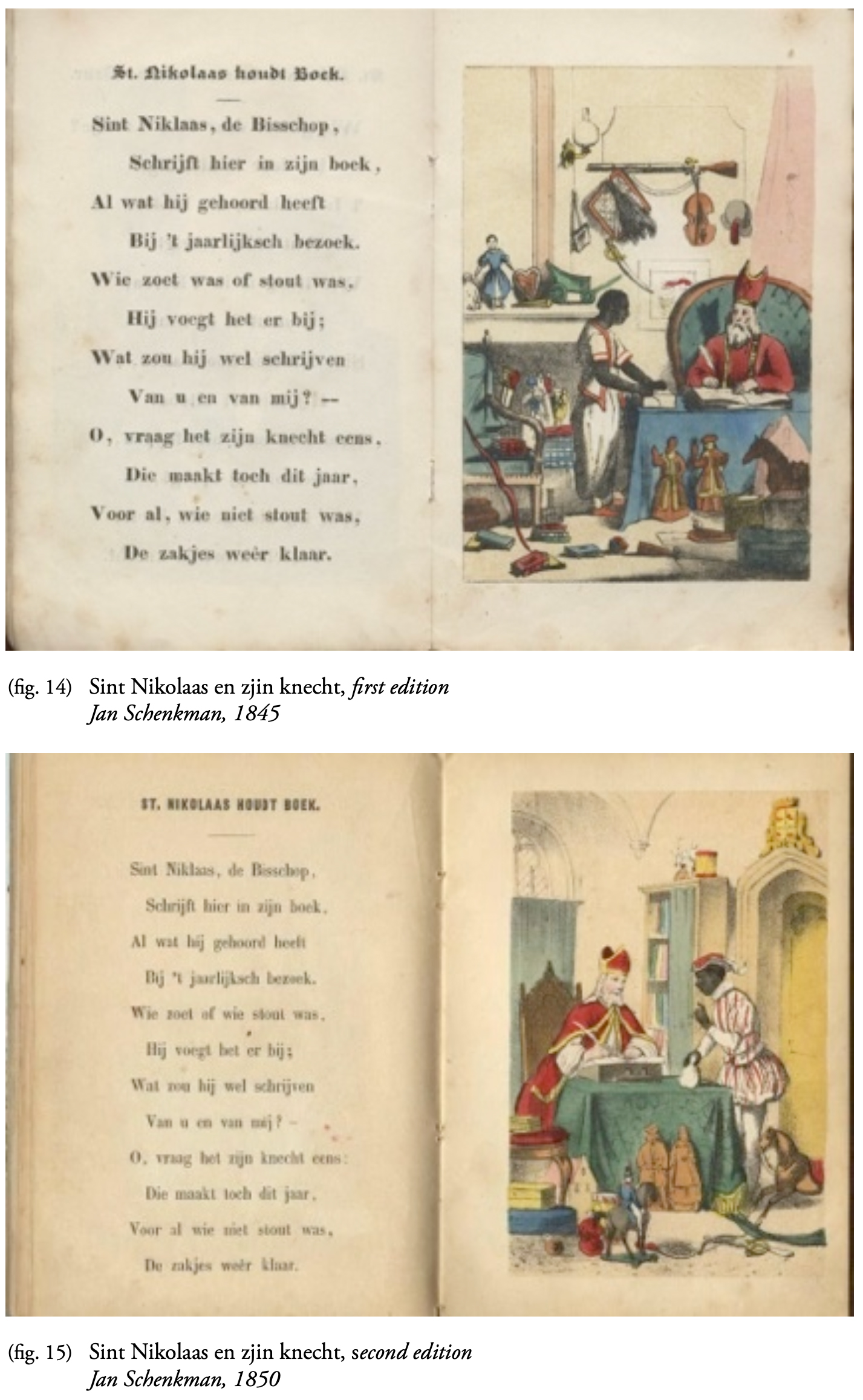
Comparison of Schenkman's first (1845) and second (1850) edition depictions of Zwarte Piet

'Printed five years later in 1850, the revised illustrations in the second edition depict 'Zwarte Piet' in the formalized page uniform which was a prevalent representation during the Golden Age. The change in the Piet's costume establishes a clear hierarchy, a formality which does not exist in the initial depiction. Piet seems to suddenly transition from a localized helper, who signifies a distant place to a distant other who exemplifies the role of service.'

The servant is depicted as a page who appears as a dark-skinned person wearing clothes associated with Moors. The book also established another mythos that would become standard: the intocht or "entry" ceremony of Saint Nicholas and his servant (then still nameless) involving a steamboat. Schenkman has the two characters arrive from Spain with no reference made to Nicholas' historical homeland of Myra (Lycia, which was located in what is now modern-day Turkey).

The book remained in print until 1950 and has had considerable influence on the current celebration. Although in Schenkman's book the servant was nameless, author Joseph Albert Alberdingk Thijm provided him with the name "Pieter-me-knecht" in a handwritten note to E.J. Potgieter in 1850. In 1884, Alberdingk Thijm recalled that, when he was a child in 1828, he had attended a Saint Nicholas celebration in the house of Dominico Arata, an Italian merchant and consul living in Amsterdam. On this occasion, a man portraying Saint Nicholas had been accompanied by another described as "Pieter de Knecht ..., a frizzy haired Negro" who brought a large basket filled with presents.

In 1833, an Amsterdam-based magazine printed a humorous reference to "Pietermanknecht" while describing the fate that those who had sneaked out of their houses to attend that year's St. Nicholas celebrations were supposed to have endured after returning home. In 1859, the Dutch newspaper De Tijd noticed that Saint Nicholas was often accompanied by "a Negro, who, under the name of Pieter, mijn knecht, is no less popular than the Holy Bishop himself". In the 1891 book Het Feest van Sinterklaas, the servant is named Pieter. However, up until 1920, several additional publications gave the character other names and depictions that varied considerably.

Sinterklaas and Zwarte Piet visiting the fishing village of Volendam and giving candy to kids, 1938

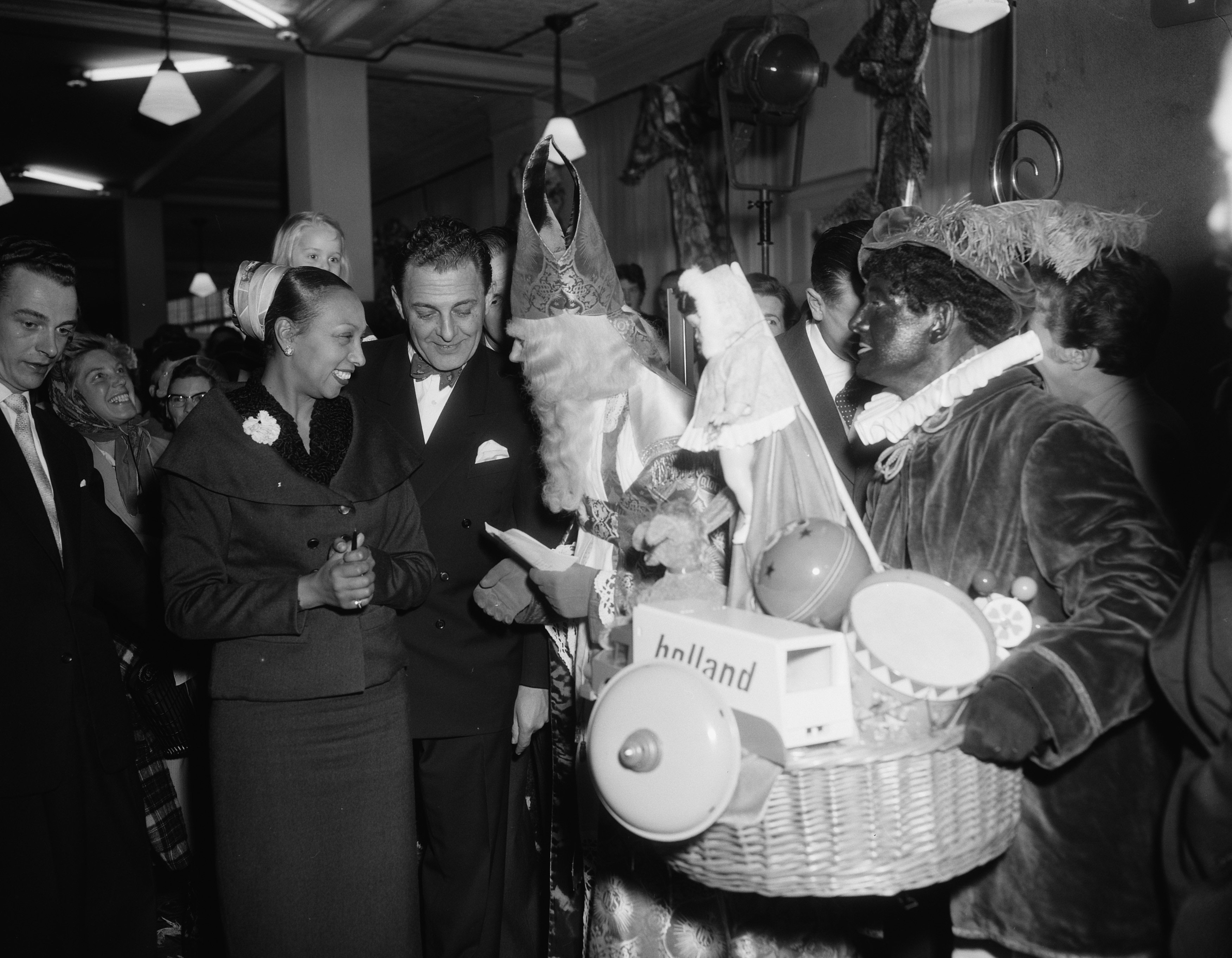
Josephine Baker meeting Sinterklaas and Zwarte Piet (V&D Amsterdam, 22 November 1957)

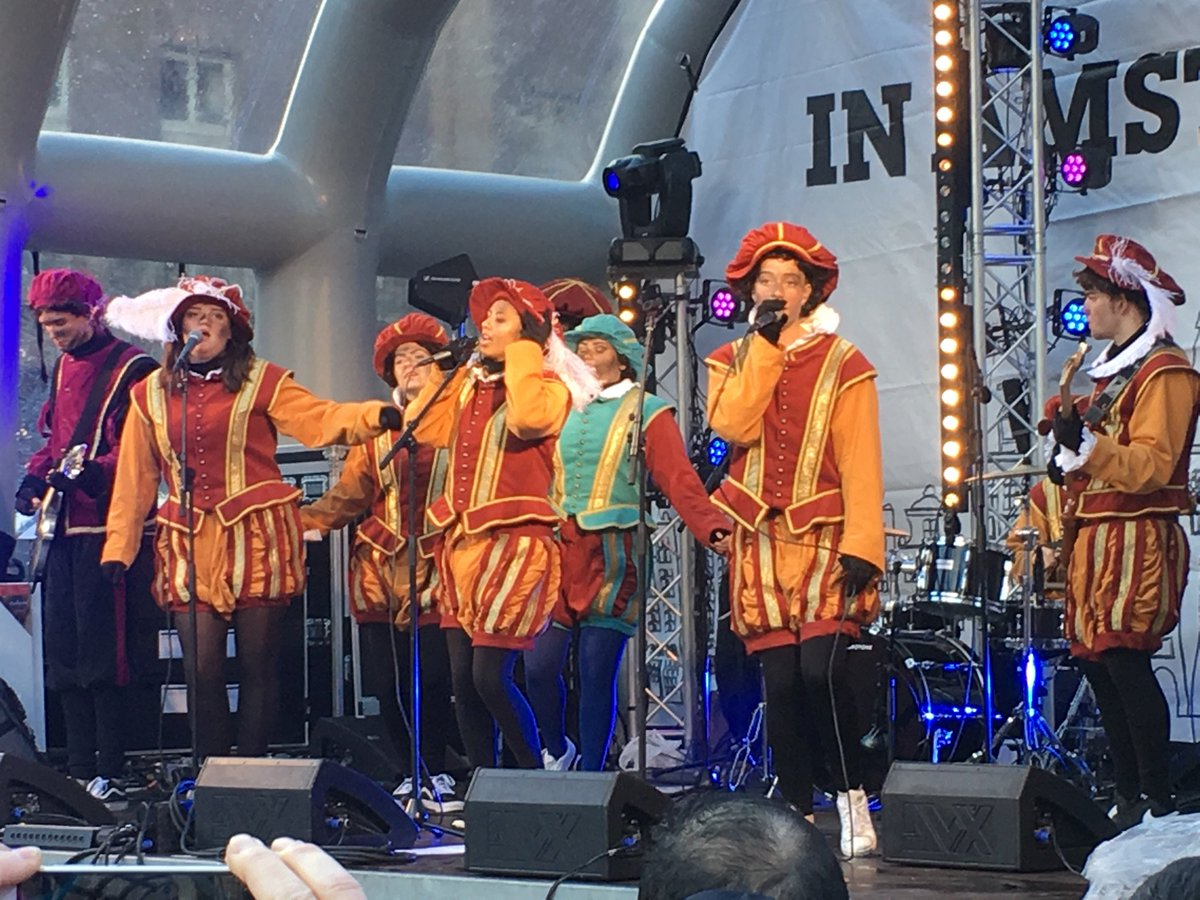
Several performers in Sooty Piet costumes during a 2016 celebration in Amsterdam

According to a story from the Legenda Aurea, retold by Eelco Verwijs in his 1863 monograph Sinterklaas, one of the miraculous deeds performed by Saint Nicholas after his death consisted of freeing a boy from slavery at the court of the "Emperor of Babylon" and delivering him back to his parents. No mention is made of the boy's skin color. However, over the course of the 20th century, narratives started to surface that claimed Zwarte Piet was a former slave who had been freed by the saint and had subsequently become his lifelong companion.

One version of the folklore surrounding the character suggests that Zwarte Piet's blackness is due to a permanent layer of soot on his body acquired during his many trips down the chimneys of the homes he visits.

=== Early criticism and controversies ===
The character became increasingly controversial during the latter part of the 20th century. In addition to editorials and newspaper articles, Zwarte Piet was discussed during a 1987 episode of the Dutch edition of Sesame Street. In a segment, Pino, the Dutch version of Big Bird, learned how Zwarte Piet can be interpreted as racist while talking with the Dutch-Surinamese actress and singer Gerda Havertong.

Beginning in the 1990s, there were several attempts to introduce a revised version of Zwarte Piet to the Dutch public that featured different shades and colors of makeup instead of the traditional black one. Model Doutzen Kroes later criticized Zwarte Piet and said she was ashamed of the Netherlands because of the character while on the Dutch talk show Pauw & Witteman in 2009.

=== Notable events during the 21st century ===
Beginning in the 2010s, communities and various organizations across the Netherlands and elsewhere gradually began using either the traditional version of Zwarte Piet in celebrations or variations, most commonly the sooty version. Some included both. These decisions resulted in protests and violent incidents involving pro-Piet demonstrators (those who endorse the traditional version of the character) and anti-Piet demonstrators (those who endorse a revised version of the character or doing away with him altogether).

In 2015, the Bijenkorf department store chain opted to replace holiday displays featuring Zwarte Piet with a golden-skinned version instead. Elsewhere, one in three Dutch primary schools announced plans to alter the character's appearance in their celebrations. Nickelodeon in the Netherlands also decided to use a racially mixed group of actors to portray Piet in their holiday broadcasts instead of white people wearing dark make‑up. RTL Nederland made a similar decision in the autumn of 2016 and replaced the characters with actors with soot on their faces.

However, in 2018, several members of a production crew refused to work on Dutch broadcaster NTR's nationally televised celebration because of a decision to alter the character. Several Dutch entertainers have also continued to use the traditional version of the character. Among them are the singers Leon Krijgsman and Herman van Doorn who released songs promoted with music videos featuring Piets played by white actors.

In November 2017, a group of anti-Piet demonstrators were prevented from attending a demonstration during a nationally televised celebration in the town of Dokkum after their vehicles were blocked on the A7 motorway by pro-Piet demonstrators, 34 of whom were later charged and found guilty of obstructing traffic. During intocht celebrations throughout November 2018, violent incidents took place in the cities and towns of Nijmegen, The Hague, Leeuwarden, Den Helder, Rotterdam, and elsewhere. In Eindhoven, anti-Piet demonstrators were surrounded by an estimated group of 250 people described as "football hooligans" who attacked them with eggs and shouted racist insults. A similar protest in Tilburg led to the arrest of 44 pro‑Piet demonstrators. Dutch comedian and political commentator Arjen Lubach covered the controversies surrounding the character and these incidents during a 2017 segment on his television program Zondag Met Lubach.

In 2019, it was decided that the nationally televised arrival of Sinterklaas hosted by Apeldoorn would feature only sooty versions. That November, a group called Kick Out Zwarte Piet were attacked during a meeting. Windows were smashed, nearby vehicles were vandalized, and fireworks were shot into the building where the group was planning protests in 12 communities that still feature traditional versions of the character. In June 2020, American broadcaster NBC and Netflix opted to remove footage of a character dressed as Zwarte Piet from an episode of The Office. Series creator Greg Daniels released a statement saying that "blackface is unacceptable and making the point so graphically is hurtful and wrong. I am sorry for the pain that caused."

In the wake of the George Floyd protests in the Netherlands, Prime Minister Mark Rutte stated in a parliamentary debate on 5 June 2020 that he had changed his opinion on the issue and now better understands why many people consider the character's appearance to be racist. In August 2020, Facebook updated its policies to ban depictions of blackface on its Facebook and Instagram platforms, including traditional blackface depictions of Zwarte Piet. In October 2020, Google banned advertising featuring Zwarte Piet, including soot versions without blackface. Additional companies followed suit, among them Bol, Amazon, and Coolblue, who each decided to remove traditional Zwarte Piet products and promotions from their services. In November 2020, Vereniging van Openbare Bibliotheken, a national association of public libraries, also announced that they were in the process of removing books featuring Zwarte Piet from library shelves.

Celebrations in Aruba stopped using the character in 2020 and the government banned him. Riot police were called to the village of Staphorst after pro-Piet demonstrators violently attacked anti-Piet demonstrators prior to a celebration in November 2022. A similar incident occurred a year later in the town of De Lier. Anti-Piet demonstrators were pelted with fireworks and eggs after pro-blackface demonstrators vandalized nearby surveillance cameras and were later discovered to have weapons in their vehicles as well as hay bales and containers of manure set aside for further attacks.

The portrayals of both Sinterklaas and Zwarte Piet can vary from region to region. Until 2020, the holiday was celebrated in the Netherlands Antilles where Sinterklaas was often played by a white-painted actor who was accompanied by several others dressed as Zwarte Piet.

== Public opinion in the Netherlands and worldwide ==
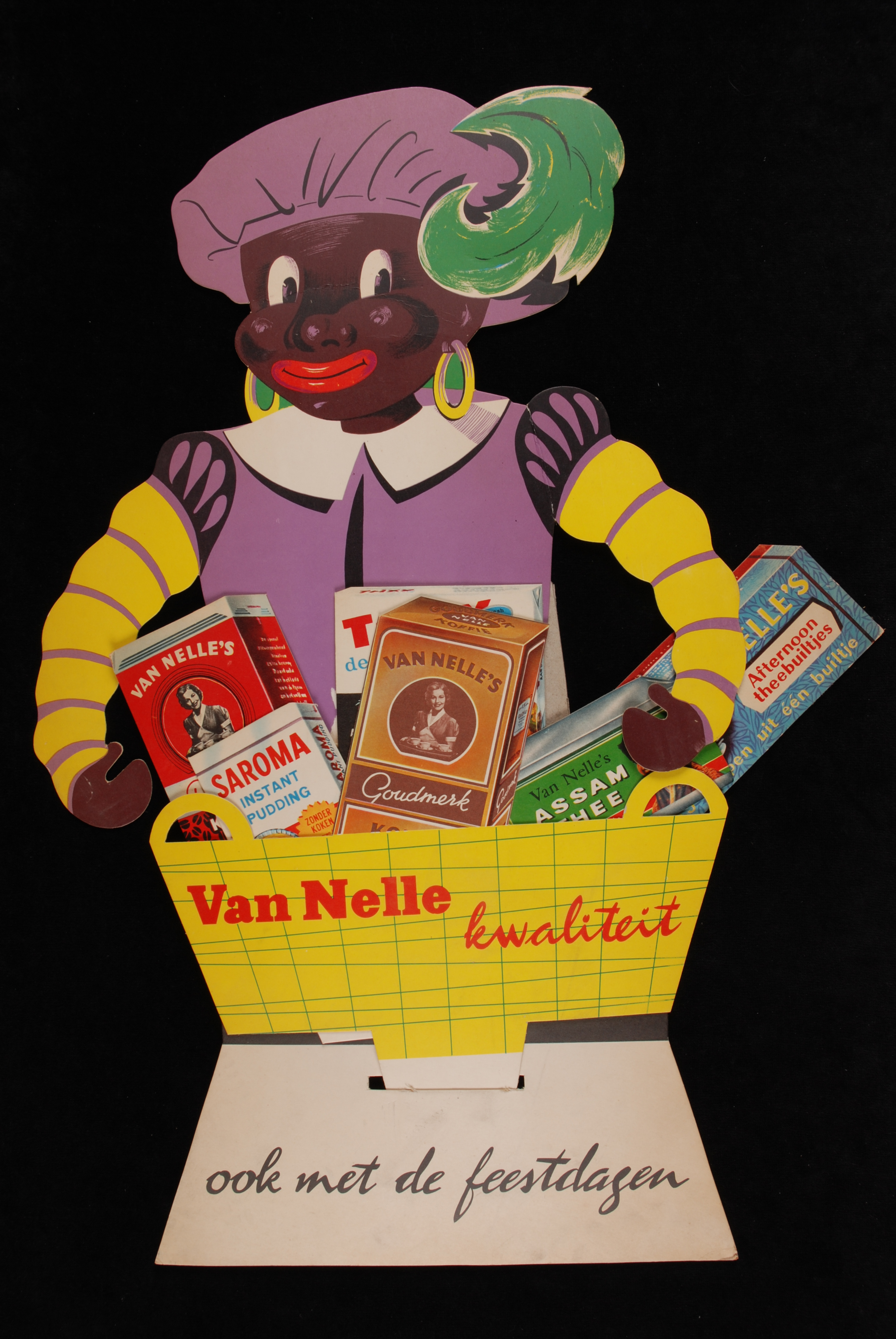
Advertisement from the early 1960s featuring Zwarte Piet

Owing to the character's traditional depiction, which often involves white actors and volunteers dressing up in blackface while wearing black wigs and large earrings, Zwarte Piet became increasingly controversial beginning in the late 20th century. The public debate surrounding the figure was described as polarized in the early 2010s. Opponents argued the character was an insult to black people while supporters considered him a harmless holiday tradition and an inseparable part of their cultural heritage.

Outside of the Netherlands, the character received criticism from a wide variety of international publications and organizations. In 2015, the United Nations Committee on the Elimination of Racial Discrimination wrote in a report that "the character of Black Pete is sometimes portrayed in a manner that reflects negative stereotypes of people of African descent and is experienced by many people of African descent as a vestige of slavery", and urged the Netherlands to "actively promote the elimination" of racial stereotyping. American writer David Sedaris critiqued the tradition in his essay "Six to Eight Black Men". In 2019, media personality Kim Kardashian described Zwarte Piet as "disturbing" in a tweet to her over 62 million followers on Twitter.

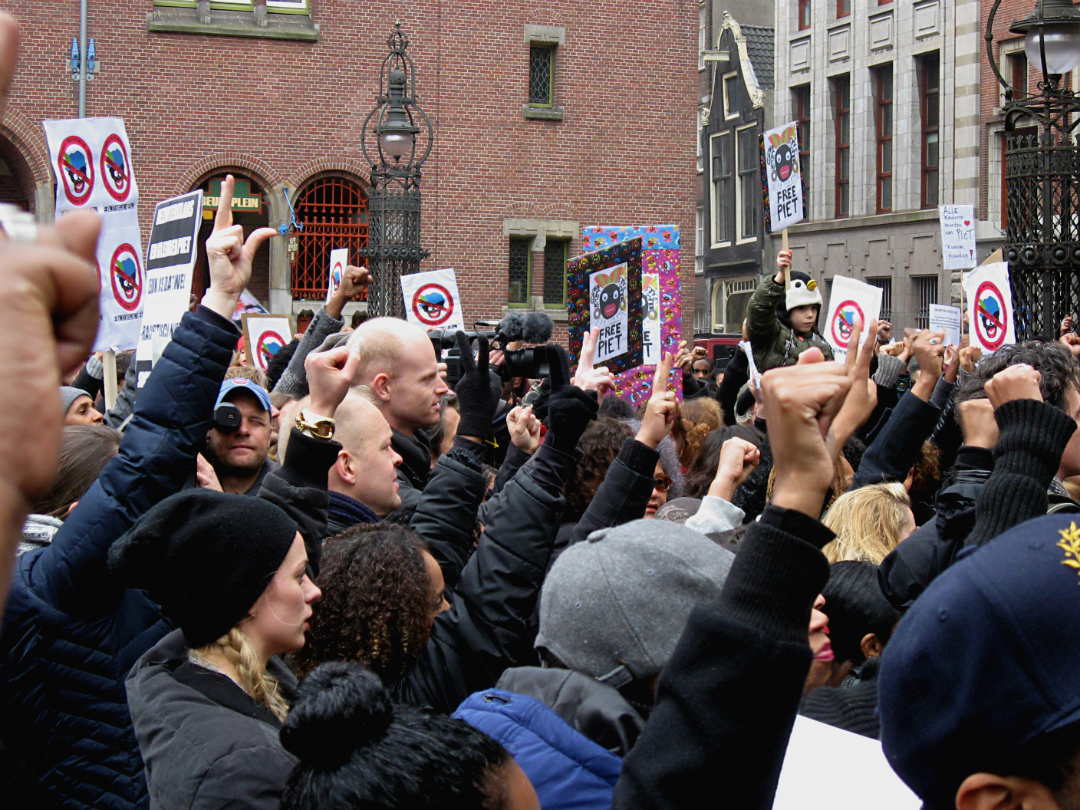
Demonstrators at an anti-Zwarte Piet protest in Amsterdam in November 2013

Sign about Zwarte Piet at a Black Lives Matter demonstration in Leeuwarden in 2020

In 2012 in Amsterdam, most opposition toward the character was found among the Ghanaian, Antillean and Dutch-Surinamese communities. 50 percent of the Surinamese considered the figure discriminatory to others, whereas 27 percent consider the figure to be discriminatory toward themselves. Throughout the early 2010s, a large majority of the overall populace in both the Netherlands and Belgium was in favour of retaining the traditional Zwarte Piet character. Studies showed the perception of Zwarte Piet differed greatly among different ethnic backgrounds, age groups, and regions.

According to a 2013 survey, upward of 90 percent of the Dutch public did not perceive Zwarte Piet to be a racist character, did not associate him with slavery, and were opposed to altering the character's appearance. A 2015 study among Dutch children aged 3 to 7 showed they perceived Zwarte Piet to be a fantastical clownish figure rather than a black person. However, the number of Dutch people who were willing to change certain details of the character (for example his lips and hair) was later reported to be growing.

By 2018, studies showed that between 80 and 88 percent of the Dutch public did not perceive Zwarte Piet as racist, but between 41 and 54 percent were happy with the character's modernized Sooty Piet style. Others continued to make the case that Zwarte Piet was racist due to extreme undertones, among them that Zwarte Piet was a subservient slave and that the tradition enforced racial stereotypes.

The George Floyd protests and subsequent Black Lives Matter demonstrations in the Netherlands in 2020 led to a further decrease in acceptance of the traditional version of Zwarte Piet. A June 2020 survey saw a drop in support for the character's traditional blackface depiction. 47 percent of those surveyed supported the traditional appearance, compared to 71 percent in a similar survey held in November 2019. However, a December 2020 survey by EenVandaag revealed that 55 percent of those surveyed still supported the traditional appearance of Zwarte Piet while 34 percent supported changing the character's appearance and 11 percent were unsure. The survey reported that 78 percent did not see Zwarte Piet as a racist figure whereas 17 percent did. The most frequently mentioned reason of those who were in favor of changing the character was to put an end to the discussion.

== See also ==
- Companions of Saint Nicholas – Folkloric figures who accompany the gift-bringer
- Border Morris – English folk dances
- Hajji Firuz – Character in Iranian folklore who appears in the streets by the beginning of Nowruz
- Siuda Baba – Old Polish folk custom, celebrated on Easter Monday
- Tattamangalam Kuthira Vela – Full-black body paint festival in Kerala, India
- Kick Out Zwarte Piet – Dutch activist organization
