= Knecht Ruprecht =

Companion of Saint Nicholas in Germanic folklore

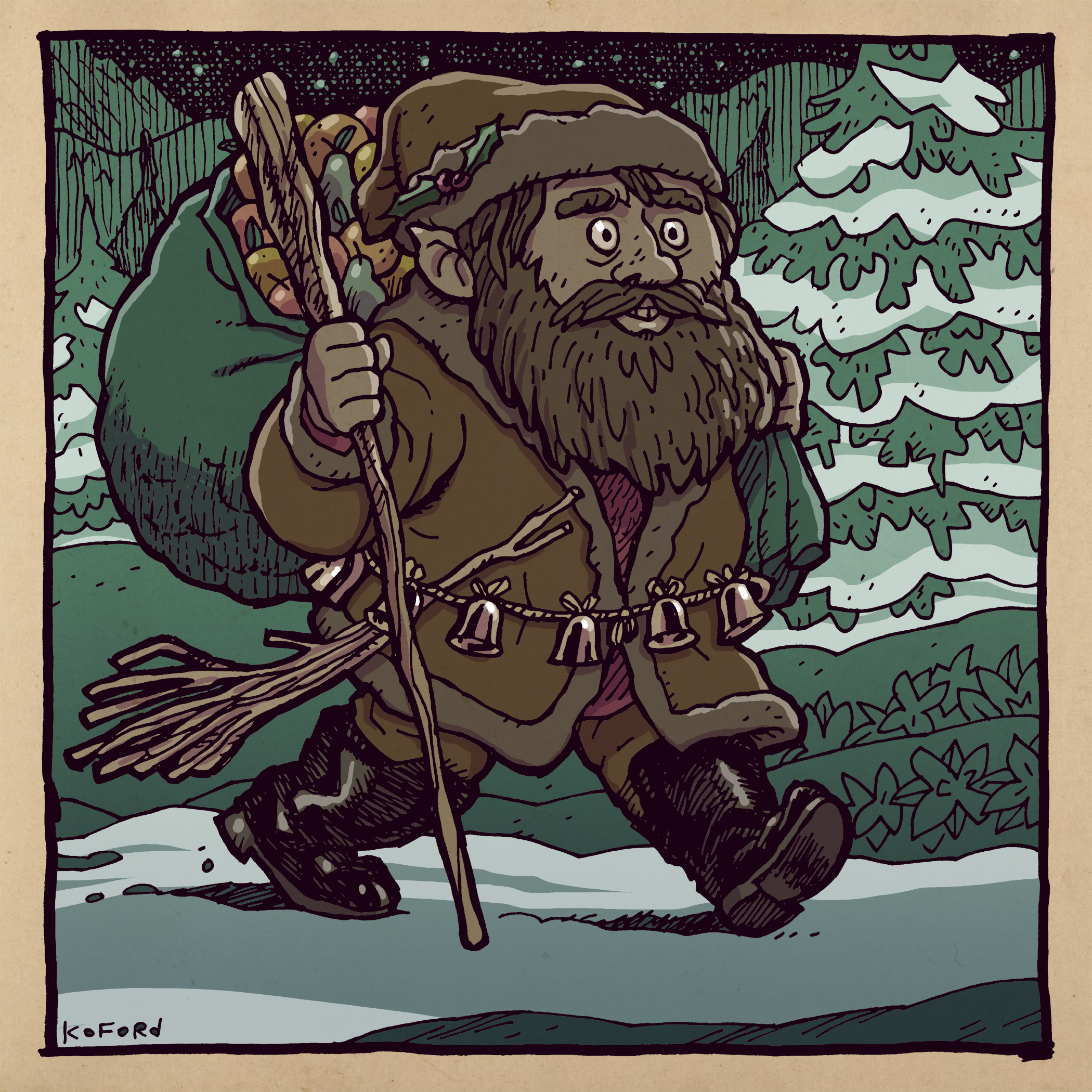
- Illustration

Creature information
- Other name(s): Rû Clås, Hans Ruprecht, Rumpknecht, Bullerclås, Schmutzli, Butzli, Ruppknecht, Pelznickel, Rupperich, Hans Muff, Farmhand Rupert
- Grouping: Companion
- Similar entities: Krampus, Zwarte Piet, Snegurochka
- Folklore: German

Origin
- Country: Germany, Austria, Switzerland, Liechtenstein
- Region: Central Europe, Southern Germany
- Details: Known as the companion of the Nikolaus

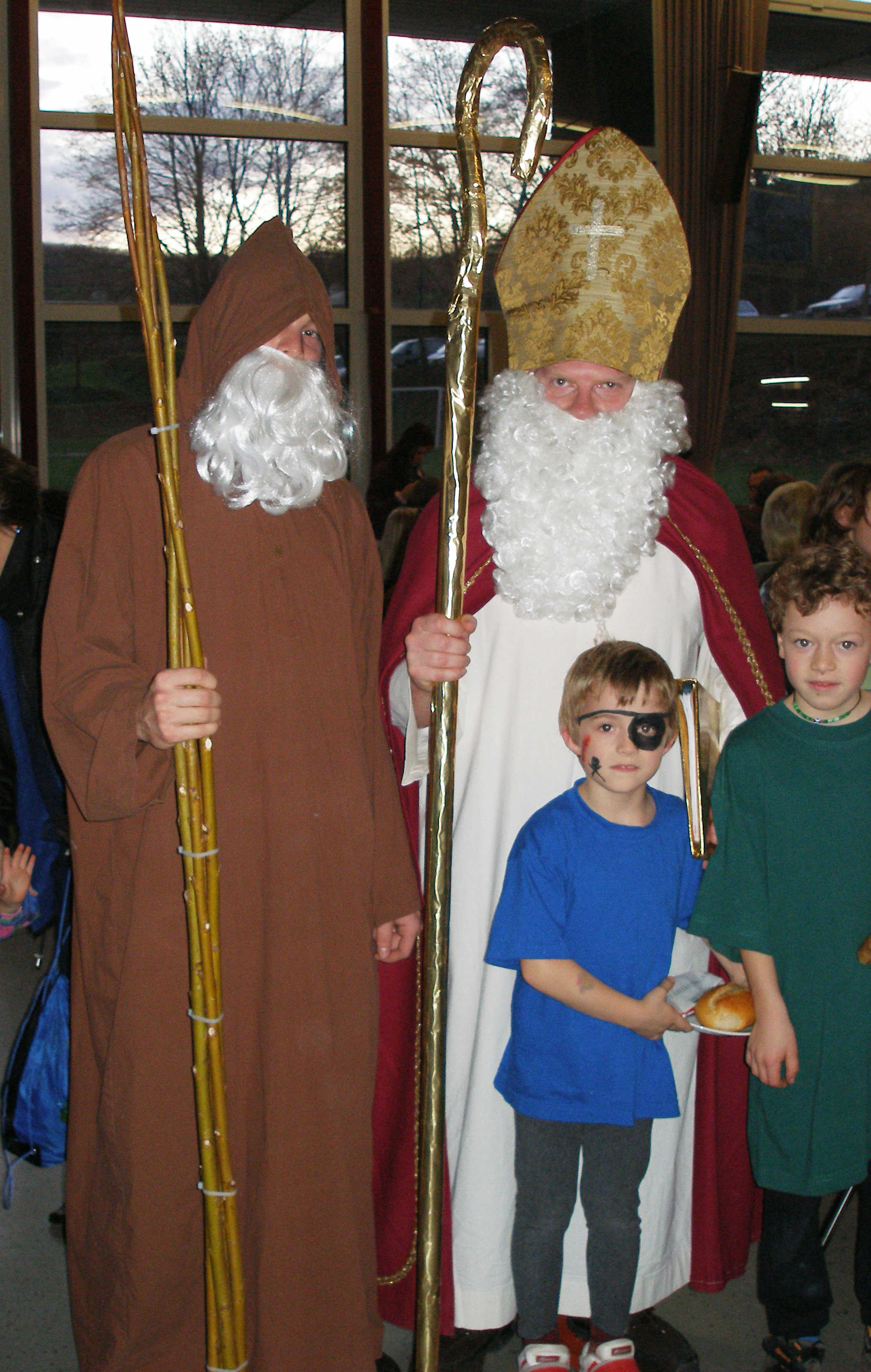
Knecht Ruprecht (on the left) and Saint Nicholas

Knecht Ruprecht (German pronunciation: [ˌknɛçtˈʁuː.pʁɛçt]; English: Farmhand Rupert, Servant Rupert or Farmhand Robert, Servant Robert) is a companion of Saint Nicholas as described in the folklore of Germany. He is the most popular gift-bringing character in Germany after Saint Nicholas, Christkindl, and Der Weihnachtsmann but is virtually unknown outside the country. He first appears in written sources in the 17th century, as a figure in a Nuremberg Christmas procession.

== Background ==
The companions of Saint Nicholas are a group of closely related figures who accompany Saint Nicholas in territories formerly in the Holy Roman Empire or the countries that it influenced culturally. These characters act as a foil to the benevolent Christmas gift-bringer, threatening to thrash or abduct disobedient children. Jacob Grimm (in Deutsche Mythologie) associated this character with the pre-Christian house spirit (kobold, elf) which could be either benevolent or malicious, but whose mischievous side was emphasized after Christianization.

== Various traditions ==
Knecht Ruprecht is Saint Nicholas' most familiar attendant in Germany. In the Mittelmark, Knecht Ruprecht is known as Hans Ruprecht, Rumpknecht, but is also referred to as De hêle Christ ("The Holy Christ"), while in Mecklenburg he was called Rû Clås (Rough Nicholas). In the Altmark and in East Friesland, he was known as Bûr and Bullerclås. Knecht Ruprecht first appears in written sources in the 17th century, as a figure in a Nuremberg Christmas procession. Samuel Taylor Coleridge encountered a Knecht Ruprecht character in a 1798 visit to Ratzeburg, a town in northern Germany, which he described as "outfitted in 'high buskins, a white robe, a mask, and an enormous flax wig'". Ruprecht otherwise is described as wearing a black or brown robe with a pointed hood, and sometimes walking with a limp because of a childhood injury, or carrying a long staff and a bag of ashes, or occasionally wearing little bells on his clothes. Sometimes he rides on a white horse, and sometimes he is accompanied—by men with blackened faces dressed as old women, or by fairies.

According to Alexander Tille, Knecht Ruprecht originally represented an archetypal manservant, "and has exactly as much individuality of social rank and as little personal individuality as the Junker Hanns and the Bauer Michel, the characters representative of country nobility and peasantry respectively." Tille also states that Knecht Ruprecht originally had no connection with Christmastime. Ruprecht (one of German forms of Robert) was a common name for the Devil in Germany, and Grimm states that "Robin Goodfellow is the same home-sprite whom we in Germany call Knecht Ruprecht and exhibit to children at Christmas...". According to some stories, Ruprecht began as a farmhand; in others, he is a wild foundling whom Saint Nicholas raises from childhood.

According to tradition, Knecht Ruprecht asks children whether they can pray. If they can, they receive apples, nuts and gingerbread. If they cannot, he hits the children with his bag of ashes. In other versions of the story, Knecht Ruprecht gives naughty children gifts such as lumps of coal, sticks, and stones, while well-behaving children receive sweets from Saint Nicholas. He is also reported to give naughty children a switch (stick) in their shoes for their parents to hit them with, instead of sweets, fruit and nuts, in the German tradition.

In related folk traditions more closely associated with certain regions in the High Alps, particularly the snowy villages south and west of Salzburg in Austria, the Knecht Ruprecht character functions as Saint Nicholas' assistant, rather than as the primary actor in the early December rituals; keeping a watchful eye on the benevolent saint during his journey. Both are, in turn, accompanied in these regions by an assortment of terrifying horned, goat-like creatures known as the Krampus, who seek out and terrorize misbehaving children identified by Saint Nicholas for punishment. The worst offenders are said to be whipped with birch switches, and sometimes stuffed in a hessian sack and thrown into an icy river for their bad deeds.

He is also known as Schmutzli or Butzli in Switzerland.

== In music and literature ==
German composer Robert Schumann features Knecht Ruprecht as the titular subject of one of the miniature piano pieces in his collection for children, Album for the Young, Op 68 (1848). Knecht Ruprecht is No 12.

German poet and novelist, Theodor Storm, wrote the poem "Knecht Ruprecht" in 1862.

== In popular culture ==
In the German version of The Simpsons television show, the family dog is named Knecht Ruprecht rather than Santa's Little Helper.

== See also ==
- Belsnickel
- Zwarte Piet
- Krampus
- Companions of Saint Nicholas
