= Leon Krijgsman =

Dutch singer

- Born: June 17, 1973 (age 53); Netherlands
- Occupation: Singer
- Years active: 1999–present
- Website: www.leonkrijgsman.nl

Leon Krijgsman (born June 17, 1973) is a Dutch singer.

Between 1999 and 2009 Leon hosted programs for the Dutch Fox Kids and Jetix channels, of which one example is "Pokémon Flippo Update". In most of his programs he is known for not only hosting the program but also playing at least one additional character.

== Discography ==
(among others)

- 2018: "1 Miljoen Schoenen"
