= Chinese almond biscuit =

Chinese pastry made with ground mung bean

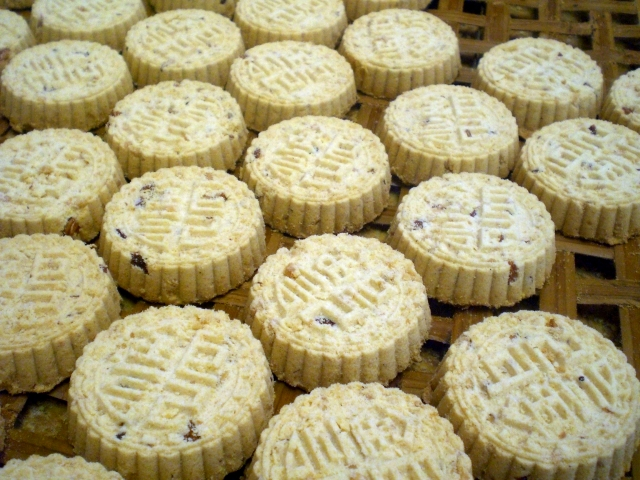
- Alternative names: Chinese almond cookie almond cake
- Type: biscuit
- Course: dessert
- Place of origin: China
- Region or state: Guangdong, Hong Kong and Macau
- Main ingredients: mung bean, almond, butter or vegetable oil, sugar and water

A Chinese almond biscuit or Chinese almond cookie (Chinese: 杏仁餅) is a type of Chinese pastry that is made with ground mung bean. It was originally made without almond, and the name refers to the almond shape of the original biscuit, but now the Chinese almond biscuit is usually round-shaped and often contains almond. The biscuit is one of the most standard pastries in Guangdong, Hong Kong, Macau, and in some overseas Chinese bakeries. They are small, containing no filling. In addition, they are very crumbly.

In Macau, the snack has been one of the most popular specialty products, especially near the Ruins of the Cathedral of St. Paul, streets are packed with 10 to 20 stores, all selling different flavors of almond biscuits next to one another. Hawkers line up on the street to push the merchandise. It is recommended on the official Macau tourism website as a famous Macanese snack. Choi Heong Yuen Bakery and Koi Kei are among the most famous brands of almond biscuits from Macau.

== See also ==
- Almond biscuit
- Jewish almond cookie
