= Eating =

Ingestion of food

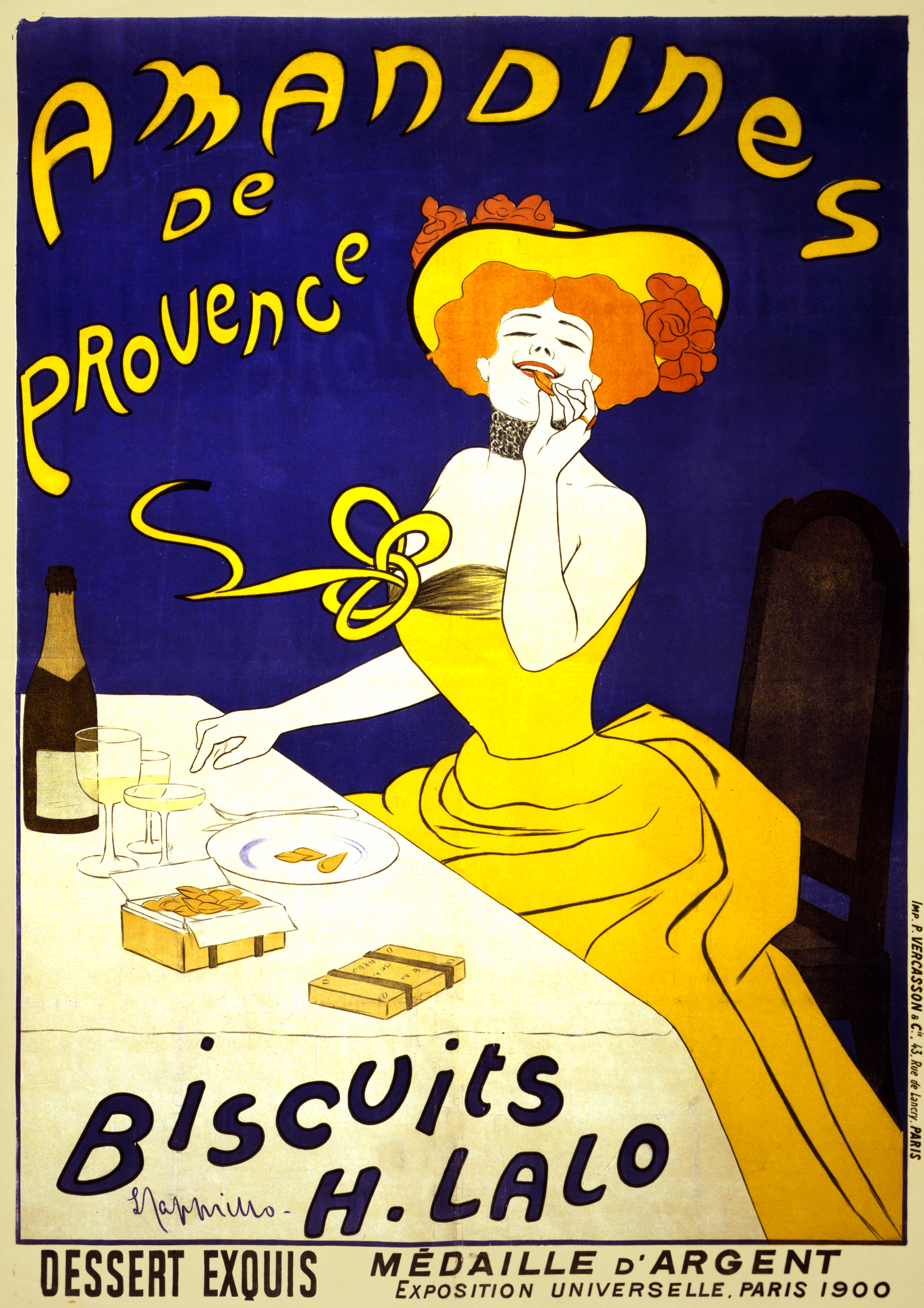
Amandines de Provence, poster by Leonetto Cappiello, 1900, which shows a woman eating almond cookies

Eating (also known as feeding or consuming) is the ingestion of food for digestion. In biology, this is typically done to provide heterotrophic organisms with the essential nutrients and energy needed for metabolism and physical growth, since they are incapable of acquiring nutrition and energy intrinsically like autotrophs and therefore must ingest external organic matters in order to survive. Animals, in particular, have evolved different forms of eating — carnivores and scavengers eat flesh (meat) from other animals, herbivores and algivores eat plants and algae, omnivores consume a mixture of both plant and animal matters, and detritivores and coprophages eat detritus and feces. Animals and phagotrophs eat and digest food internally, as opposed to decomposers such as fungi and microbes, who secrete enzymes to digest organic matters externally before absorbing the nutrients and thus do not "eat" food.

For humans, eating is more complex, but is typically an activity of daily living. Human eating is usually organized into routine sessions known as meals, where proper courses of cooked food are consumed, typically with a decent quantity of staples; and more time-flexible casual eatings known as snacks, where small quantities of typically non-staple food (often convenience food, sometimes raw foods such as fruits and nuts) are consumed more for the purpose of degustation than to satiate hunger. Formal sessions of eating, e.g. in a gathering or a date, are known as dining, and large dining events where many people are invited to eat food together are known as banquets or feasts. The craft of preparing and presenting meals for formal eating is called culinary arts, and the person performing such tasks is known as a cook, chef or cater depending on the respective nature of food service.

Physicians and dieticians consider eating a healthy diet essential for maintaining peak physical condition. Some individuals may reduce their amount of dietary intake, which may be a result of a voluntary choice as part of dieting lifestyle or as fasting for reasons of religious food prohibition, abstinence or political protest (i.e. a hunger strike). Limited consumption or rationing may also be due to logistical reasons such as a food shortage or a famine, in which case it will lead to starvation and undernutrition. On the contrary, overeating and excessive intake of calories (overnutrition) may lead to obesity and associated health problems, and while the reasons behind it are myriad, its prevalence in the developed world has led some public health professionals to declare an "obesity epidemic".

== Eating practices among humans ==
Many homes have a large kitchen area devoted to preparation of meals and food, and may have a dining room, dining hall, or another designated area for eating.

Most societies also have restaurants, food courts, and food vendors so that people may eat when away from home, when lacking time to prepare food, or as a social occasion. At their highest level of sophistication, these places become "theatrical spectacles of global cosmopolitanism and myth." At picnics, potlucks, and food festivals, eating is the primary purpose of a social gathering. At many social events, food and beverages are made available to attendees.

People usually have two or three meals a day. Snacks of smaller amounts may be consumed between meals. Doctors in the UK recommend three meals a day (with between 400 and 600 kcal per meal), with four to six hours between. Having three well-balanced meals (described as: half of the plate with vegetables, 1/4 protein food as meat, [...] and 1/4 carbohydrates as pasta, rice) will then amount to some 1800–2000 kcal, which is the average requirement for a regular person.

In jurisdictions under Sharia law, eating may be proscribed for Muslim adults during the daylight hours of Ramadan.

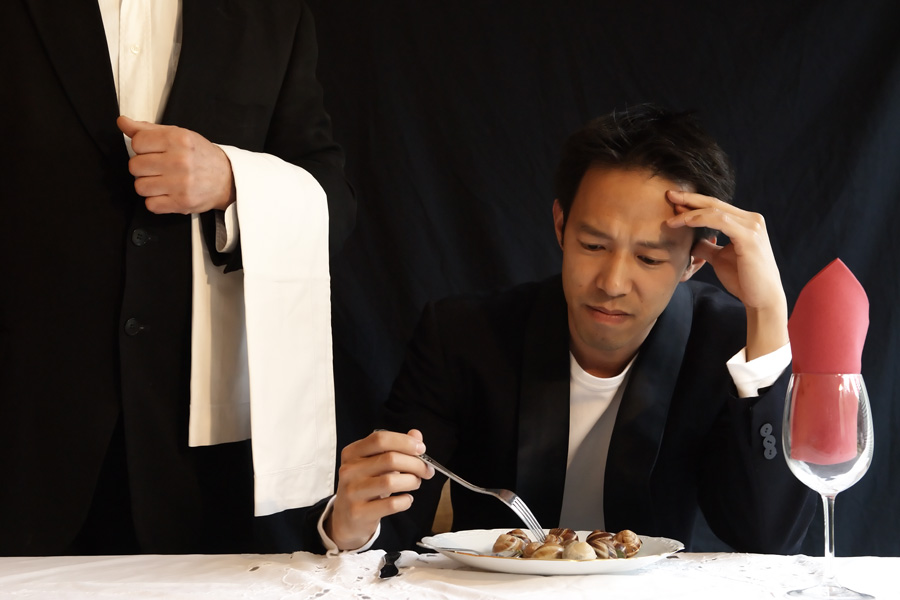
Eating with a fork at a restaurant

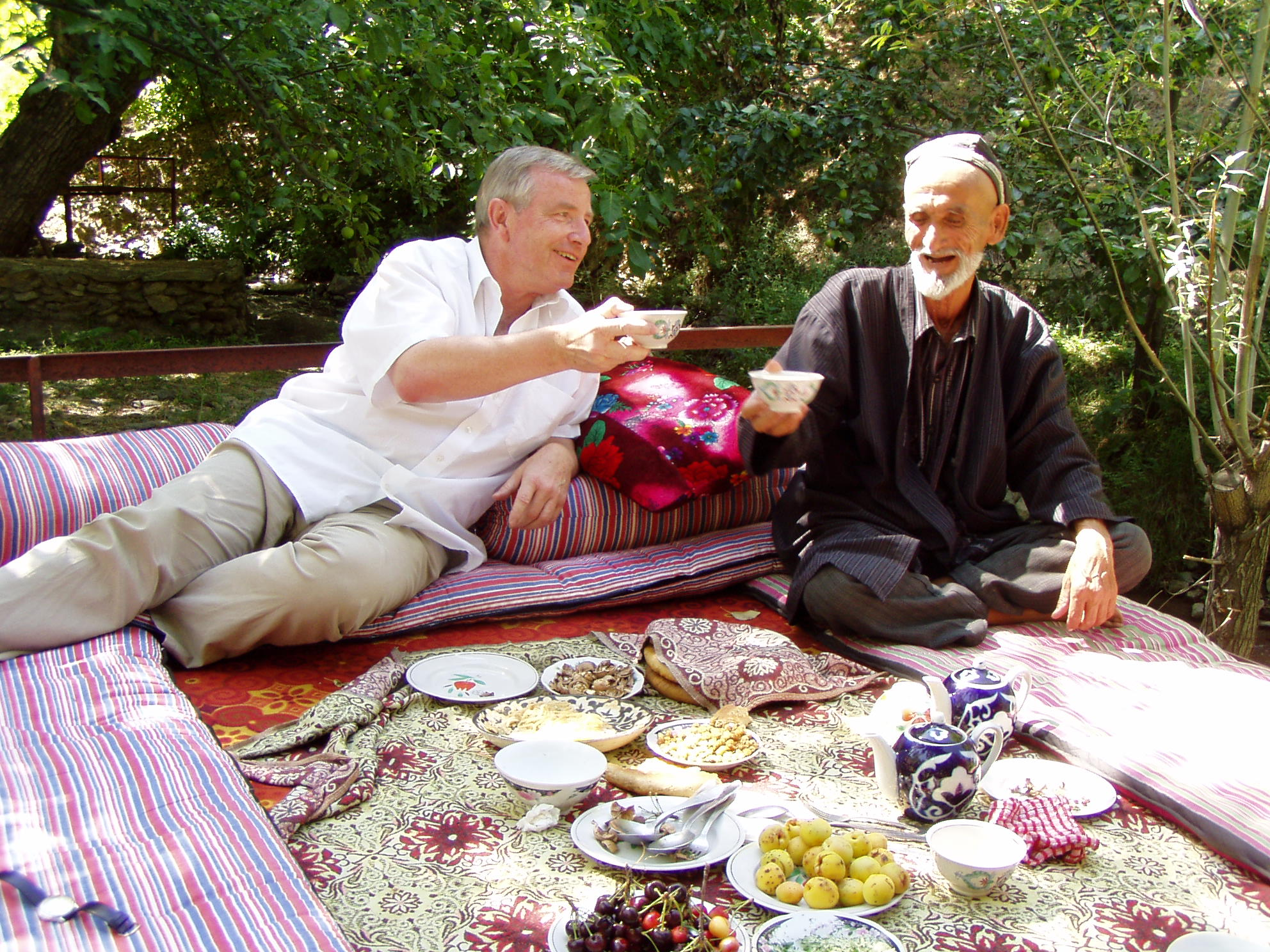
Traditional way of eating in Uzbekistan

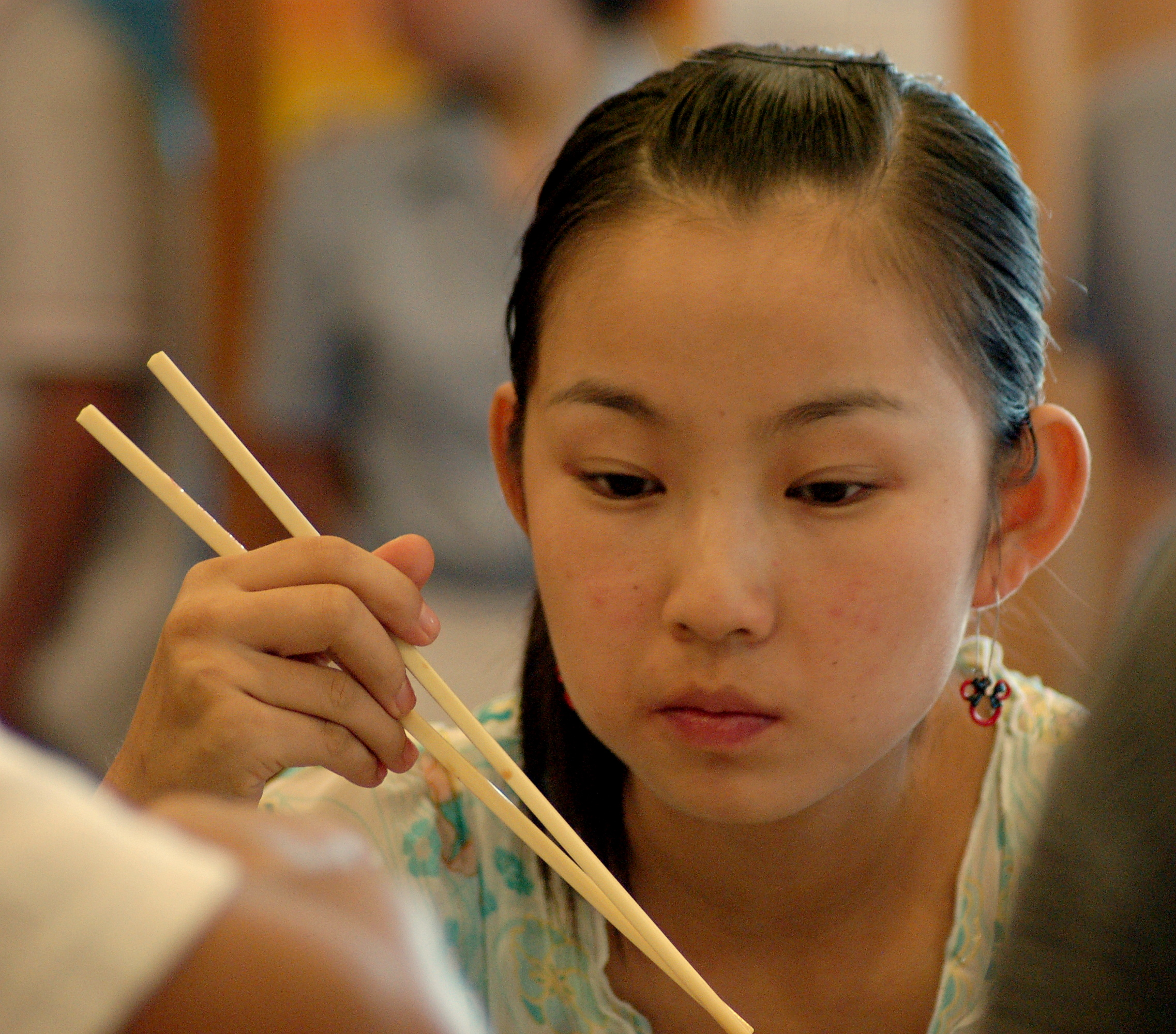
Chinese girl eating with chopsticks

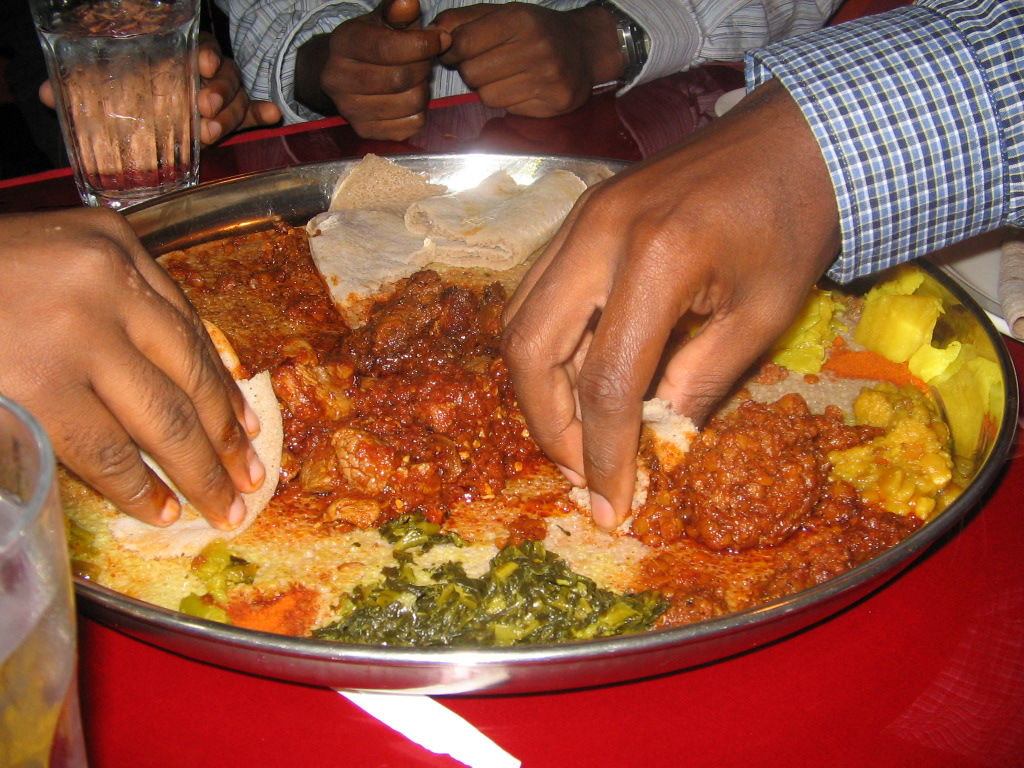
Ethiopians eating with hands

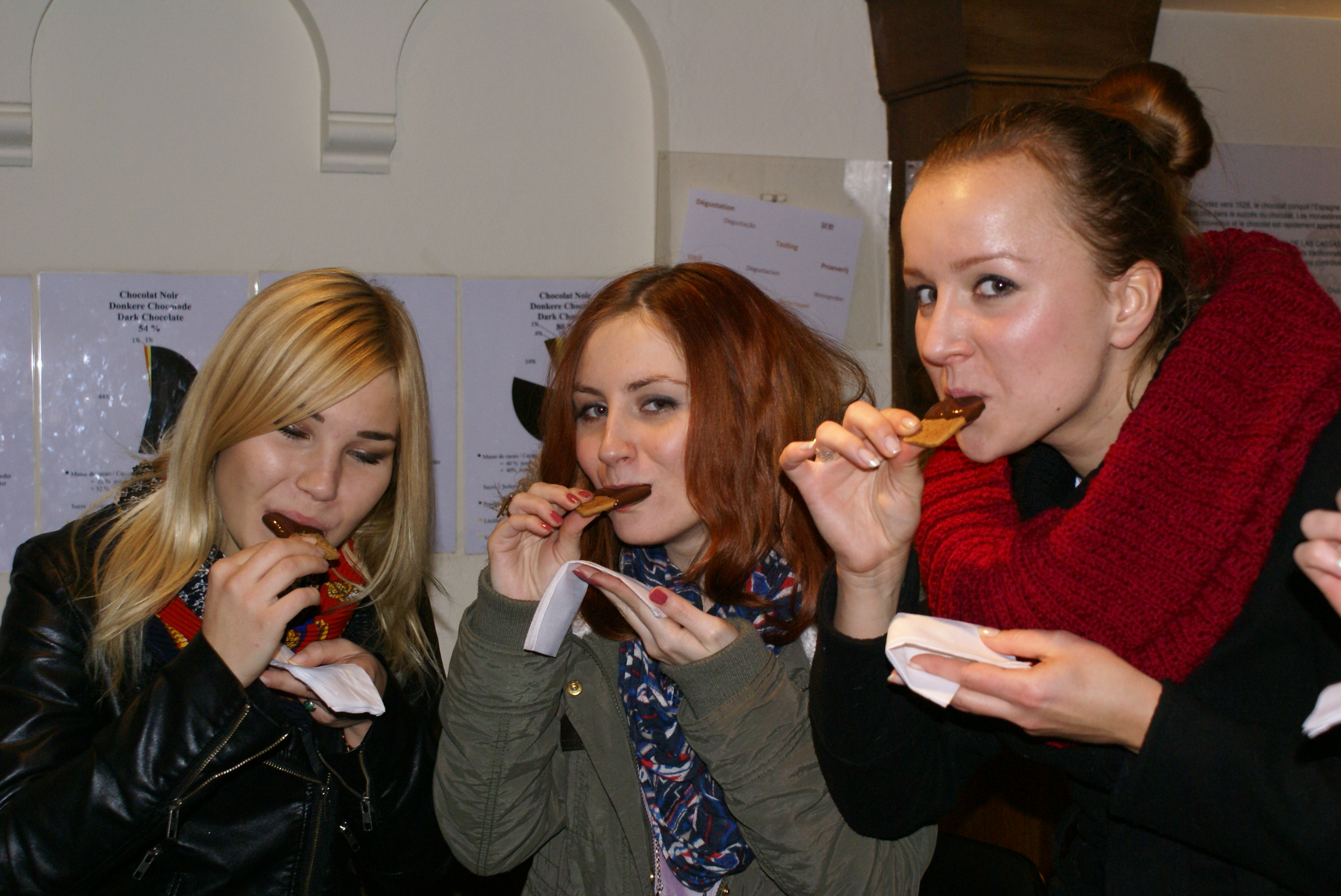
English women eating biscuits

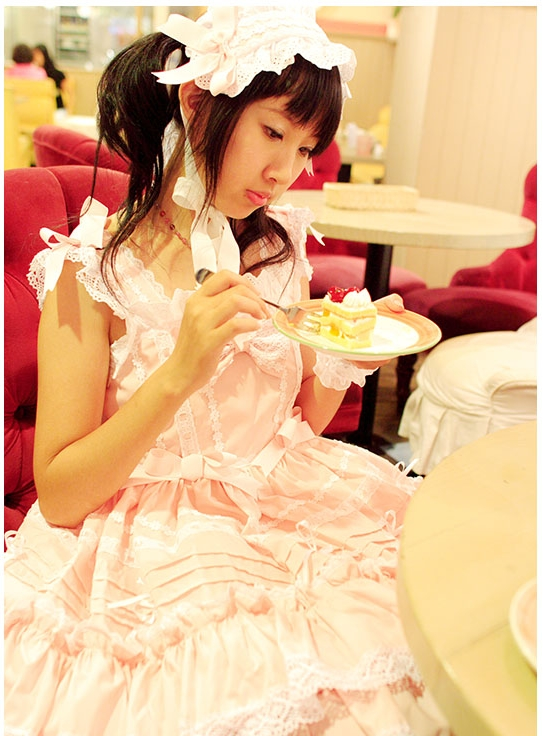
Japanese girl eating a piece of cake

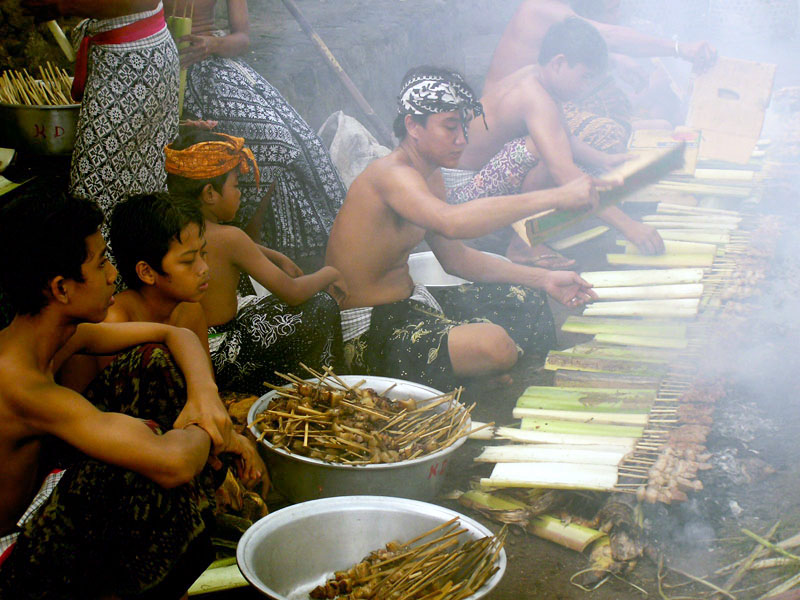
Balinese preparing food for eating

== Development in humans ==
Newborn humans are not developed enough yet to chew and thus cannot handle eating solids, and survive solely on drinking liquid breast milk or infant formula. As infant development proceeds, small amounts of puréed baby foods are sometimes fed to babies as young as two or three months old, but most infants do not eat anything solid until they are between six and eight months old. Premastication, in which adults chew up food and then "kiss-feed" a softened food bolus into the infant's mouth, can also be seen in many undeveloped countries as a form of improvised puréed food. The practices of feeding only liquid or semi-liquid food to young infants is because they still have few teeth and an immature digestive system.

Between 8 and 12 months of age, the digestive system improves and deciduous teeth progressively emerge (i.e. "teething"), and many babies can begin weaning and eating finger foods. Their diet is still limited, however, because most babies lack molars or canines at this age, and often have a limited number of incisors. By 18 months, babies often have enough teeth and a sufficiently mature digestive system to eat the same foods as adults. Learning to eat food is a messy process for children, and they often do not master neatness or eating etiquette until five or six years old.

=== Eating positions ===
Eating positions vary according to the different regions of the world, as culture influences the way people eat their meals. For example, most of the Middle Eastern countries, eating while sitting on the floor is most common, and it is believed to be healthier than eating while sitting at a table.

Eating in a reclining position was favored by the Ancient Greeks at a celebration they called a symposium, and this custom was adopted by the Ancient Romans. Ancient Hebrews also adopted this posture for traditional celebrations of Passover.

=== Compulsive overeating ===
Compulsive overeating, or emotional eating, is "the tendency to eat in response to negative emotions". Empirical studies have indicated that anxiety leads to decreased food consumption in people with normal weight and increased food consumption in the obese.

Many laboratory studies showed that overweight individuals are more emotionally reactive and are more likely to overeat when distressed than people of normal weight. Furthermore, it was consistently found that obese individuals experience negative emotions more frequently and more intensively than do normal weight persons.

The naturalistic study by Lowe and Fisher compared the emotional reactivity and emotional eating of normal and overweight female college students. The study confirmed the tendency of obese individuals to overeat, but these findings applied only to snacks, not to meals. That means that obese individuals did not tend to eat more while having meals; rather, the amount of snacks they ate between meals was greater. One possible explanation that Lowe and Fisher suggest is obese individuals often eat their meals with others and do not eat more than average due to the reduction of distress because of the presence of other people. Another possible explanation would be that obese individuals do not eat more than the others while having meals due to social desirability. Conversely, snacks are usually eaten alone.

=== Hunger and satiety ===
There are many physiological mechanisms that control starting and stopping a meal. The control of food intake is a physiologically complex, motivated behavioral system. Hormones such as cholecystokinin, bombesin, neurotensin, anorectin, calcitonin, enterostatin, leptin and corticotropin-releasing hormone have all been shown to suppress food intake.

Eating rapidly leads to obesity and overeating, probably because the feelings of satiety can be slower.

==== Initiation ====
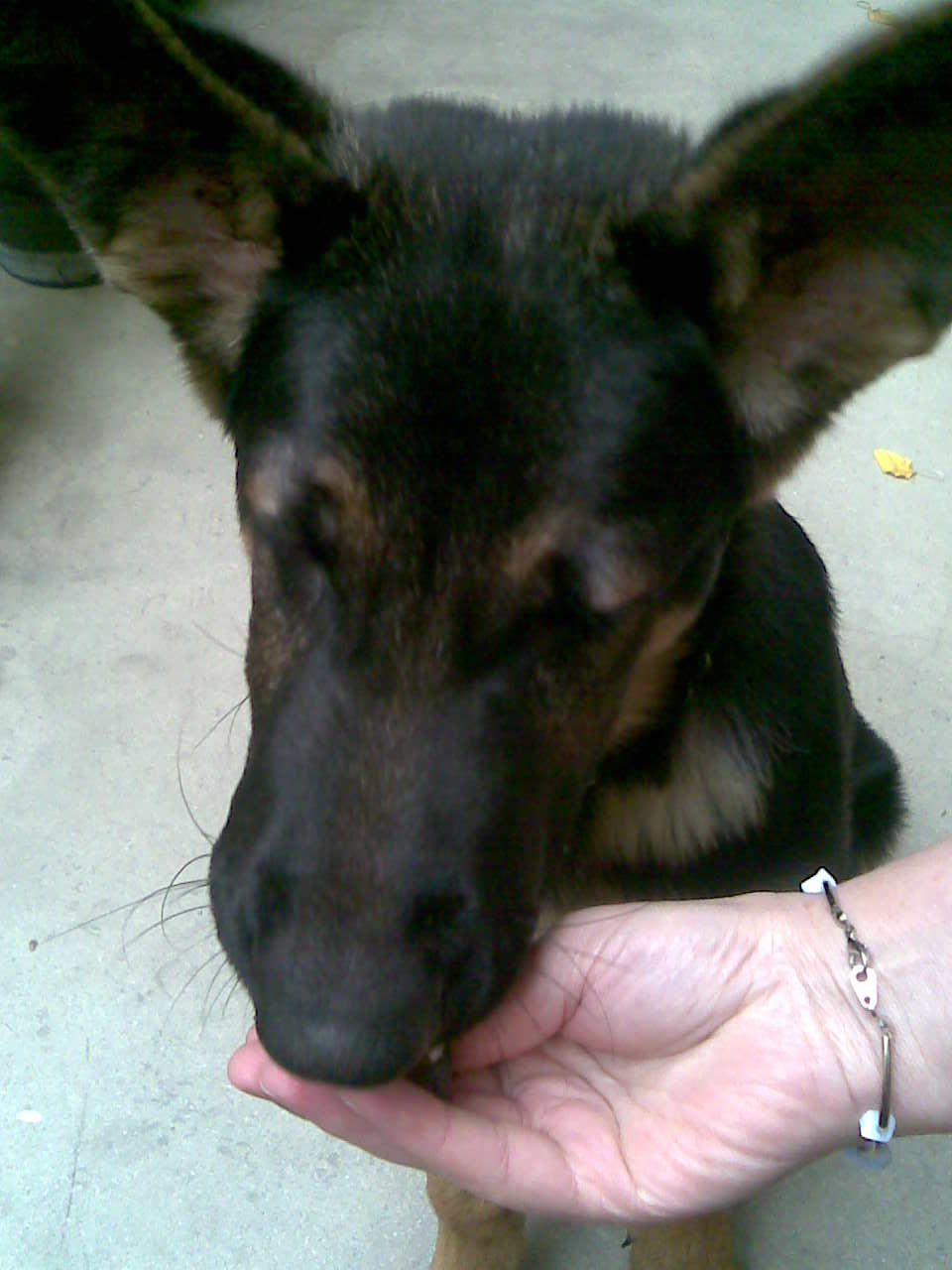
German Shepherd puppy eating out of a human hand

There are numerous signals given off that initiate hunger. There are environmental signals, signals from the gastrointestinal system, and metabolic signals that trigger hunger. The environmental signals come from the body's senses. The feeling of hunger could be triggered by the smell and thought of food, the sight of a plate, or hearing someone talk about food. The signals from the stomach are initiated by the release of the peptide hormone ghrelin. Ghrelin is a hormone that increases appetite by signaling to the brain that a person is hungry.

Environmental signals and ghrelin are not the only signals that initiate hunger, there are other metabolic signals as well. As time passes between meals, the body starts to take nutrients from long-term reservoirs. When the glucose levels of cells drop (glucoprivation), the body starts to produce the feeling of hunger. The body also stimulates eating by detecting a drop in cellular lipid levels (lipoprivation). Both the brain and the liver monitor the levels of metabolic fuels. The brain checks for glucoprivation on its side of the blood–brain barrier (since glucose is its fuel), while the liver monitors the rest of the body for both lipoprivation and glucoprivation.

==== Termination ====
There are short-term signals of satiety that arise from the head, the stomach, the intestines, and the liver. The long-term signals of satiety come from adipose tissue. The taste and odor of food can contribute to short-term satiety, allowing the body to learn when to stop eating. The stomach contains receptors to allow the body to know when it is full. The intestines also contain receptors that send satiety signals to the brain. The hormone cholecystokinin is secreted by the duodenum, and it controls the rate at which the stomach is emptied. This hormone is thought to be a satiety signal to the brain. Peptide YY 3-36 is a hormone released by the small intestine and it is also used as a satiety signal to the brain. Insulin also serves as a satiety signal to the brain. The brain detects insulin in the blood, which indicates that nutrients are being absorbed by cells and a person is getting full. Long-term satiety comes from the fat stored in adipose tissue. Adipose tissue secretes the hormone leptin, and leptin suppresses appetite. Long-term satiety signals from adipose tissue regulates short-term satiety signals.

Cessation of eating within two hours of sleeping can reduce body weight.

==== Role of the brain ====
The brain stem can control food intake, because it contains neural circuits that detect hunger and satiety signals from other parts of the body. The brain stem's involvement of food intake has been researched using rats. Rats that have had the motor neurons in the brain stem disconnected from the neural circuits of the cerebral hemispheres (decerebration), are unable to approach and eat food. Instead, they must obtain their food in a liquid form. This research shows that the brain stem does in fact play a role in eating.

There are two peptides in the hypothalamus that produce hunger, melanin concentrating hormone (MCH) and orexin. MCH plays a bigger role in producing hunger. In mice, MCH stimulates feeding and a mutation causing the overproduction of MCH led to overeating and obesity. Orexin plays a greater role in controlling the relationship between eating and sleeping. Other peptides in the hypothalamus that induce eating are neuropeptide Y (NPY) and agouti-related protein (AGRP).

Satiety in the hypothalamus is stimulated by leptin. Leptin targets the receptors on the arcuate nucleus and suppresses the secretion of MCH and orexin. The arcuate nucleus also contains two more peptides that suppress hunger. The first one is cocaine- and amphetamine-regulated transcript (CART), the second is α-MSH (α-melanocyte-stimulating hormone).

== Disorders ==
Physiologically, eating is generally triggered by hunger, but there are numerous physical and psychological conditions that can affect appetite and disrupt normal eating patterns. These include depression, food allergies, ingestion of certain chemicals, bulimia, anorexia nervosa, pituitary gland malfunction and other endocrine problems, and numerous other illnesses and eating disorders. A chronic lack of nutritious food can cause various illnesses, and will eventually lead to starvation.

While changes in appetite can result from various physical and psychological conditions, including depression, allergies, and anxiety; anorexia and bulimia are specific eating disorders that profoundly impact the entire body. In anorexia nervosa, people restrict their calorie intake out of fear of gaining weight. This malnutrition leads to an unhealthy weight, significantly impacting overall health. Bulimia is characterized by recurrent episodes of binge eating, involving the consumption of a substantial amount of food within a short period. Subsequently, individuals engage in maladaptive behaviors, such as inducing vomiting, excessive physical activity, and using laxatives as compensatory measures.

If eating and drinking is not possible, as is often the case when recovering from surgery, alternatives are enteral nutrition and parenteral nutrition.

== Other animals ==
=== Birds ===
Feeding adaptations in beaks

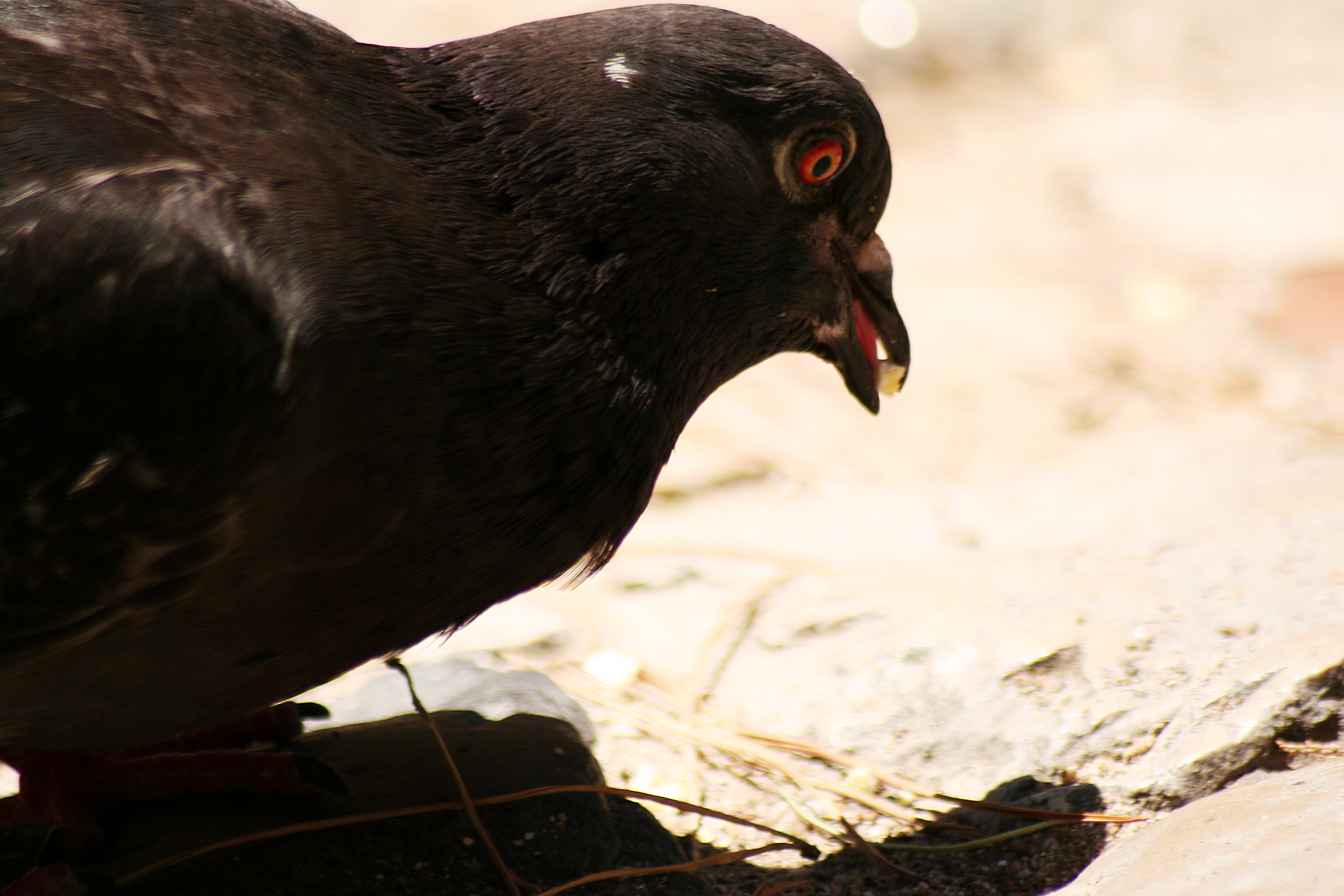
Feral pigeon eating bread.

Birds' diets are varied and often include nectar, fruit, plants, seeds, carrion, and various small animals, including other birds. The digestive system of birds is unique, with a crop for storage and a gizzard that contains swallowed stones for grinding food to compensate for the lack of teeth. Some species such as pigeons and some psittacine species do not have a gallbladder. Most birds are highly adapted for rapid digestion to aid with flight. Some migratory birds have adapted to use protein stored in many parts of their bodies, including protein from the intestines, as additional energy during migration.

Birds that employ many strategies to obtain food or feed on a variety of food items are called generalists, while others that concentrate time and effort on specific food items or have a single strategy to obtain food are considered specialists. Avian foraging strategies can vary widely by species. Many birds glean for insects, invertebrates, fruit, or seeds. Some hunt insects by suddenly attacking from a branch. Those species that seek pest insects are considered beneficial 'biological control agents' and their presence encouraged in biological pest control programmes. Combined, insectivorous birds eat 400–500 million metric tons of arthropods annually.

Nectar feeders such as hummingbirds, sunbirds, lories, and lorikeets amongst others have specially adapted brushy tongues and in many cases bills designed to fit co-adapted flowers. Kiwis and shorebirds with long bills probe for invertebrates; shorebirds' varied bill lengths and feeding methods result in the separation of ecological niches. Divers, diving ducks, penguins and auks pursue their prey underwater, using their wings or feet for propulsion, while aerial predators such as sulids, kingfishers and terns plunge dive after their prey. Flamingos, three species of prion, and some ducks are filter feeders. Geese and dabbling ducks are primarily grazers.

Some species, including frigatebirds, gulls, and skuas, engage in kleptoparasitism, stealing food items from other birds. Kleptoparasitism is thought to be a supplement to food obtained by hunting, rather than a significant part of any species' diet; a study of great frigatebirds stealing from masked boobies estimated that the frigatebirds stole at most 40% of their food and on average stole only 5%. Other birds are scavengers; some of these, like vultures, are specialised carrion eaters, while others, like gulls, corvids, or other birds of prey, are opportunists.

=== Mammals ===
A short-beaked echidna foraging for insects

To maintain a high constant body temperature is energy expensive—mammals therefore need a nutritious and plentiful diet. While the earliest mammals were probably predators, different species have since adapted to meet their dietary requirements in a variety of ways. Some eat other animals—this is a carnivorous diet (and includes insectivorous diets). Other mammals, called herbivores, eat plants, which contain complex carbohydrates such as cellulose. An herbivorous diet includes subtypes such as granivory (seed eating), folivory (leaf eating), frugivory (fruit eating), nectarivory (nectar eating), gummivory (gum eating) and mycophagy (fungus eating). The digestive tract of an herbivore is host to bacteria that ferment these complex substances, and make them available for digestion, which are either housed in the multichambered stomach or in a large cecum. Some mammals are coprophagous, consuming feces to absorb the nutrients not digested when the food was first ingested. An omnivore eats both prey and plants. Carnivorous mammals have a simple digestive tract because the proteins, lipids and minerals found in meat require little in the way of specialized digestion. Exceptions to this include baleen whales who also house gut flora in a multi-chambered stomach, like terrestrial herbivores.

The size of an animal is also a factor in determining diet type (Allen's rule). Since small mammals have a high ratio of heat-losing surface area to heat-generating volume, they tend to have high energy requirements and a high metabolic rate. Mammals that weigh less than about 18 ounces (510 g; 1.1 lb) are mostly insectivorous because they cannot tolerate the slow, complex digestive process of an herbivore. Larger animals, on the other hand, generate more heat and less of this heat is lost. They can therefore tolerate either a slower collection process (carnivores that feed on larger vertebrates) or a slower digestive process (herbivores). Furthermore, mammals that weigh more than 18 ounces (510 g; 1.1 lb) usually cannot collect enough insects during their waking hours to sustain themselves. The only large insectivorous mammals are those that feed on huge colonies of insects (ants or termites).

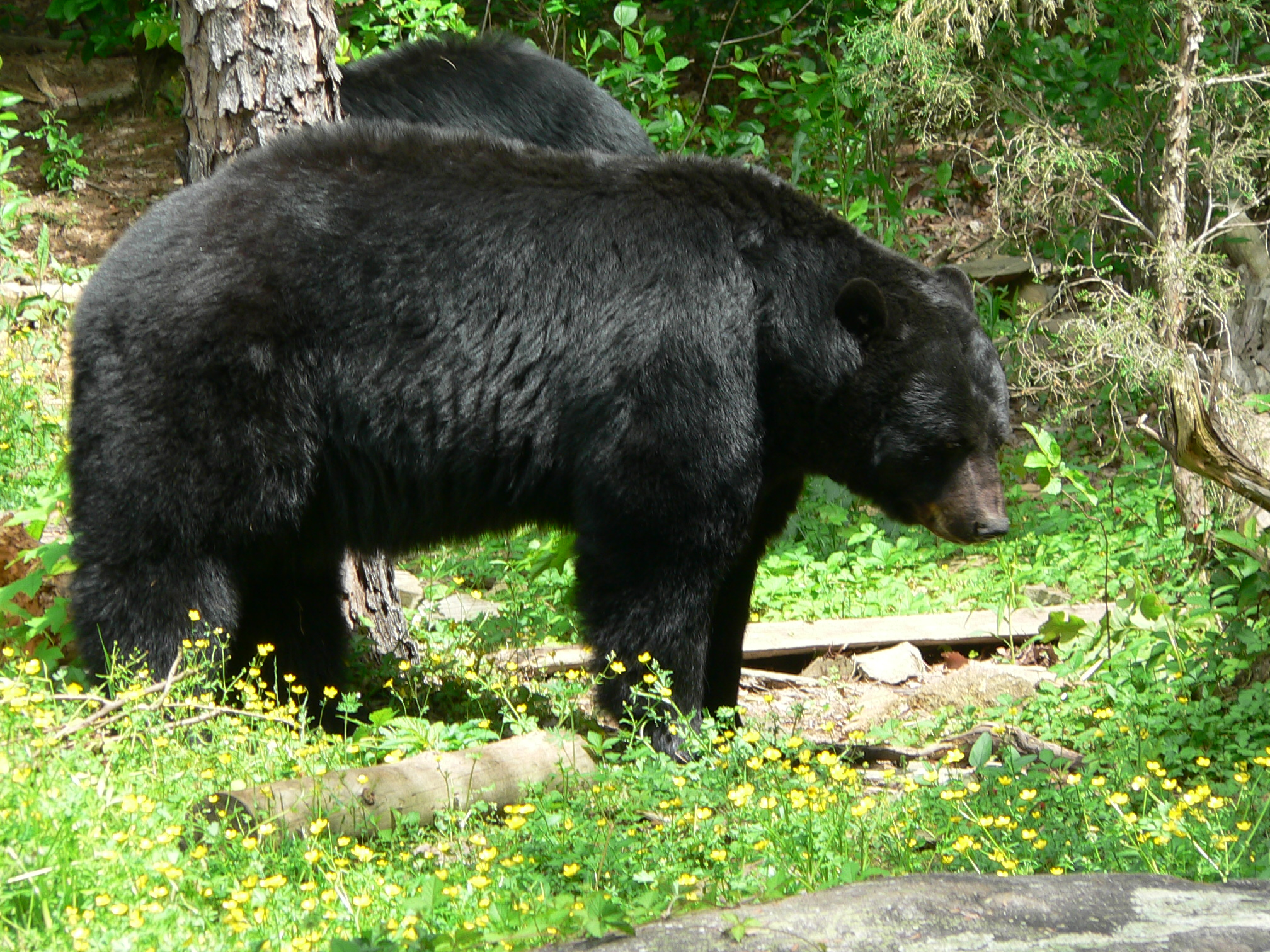
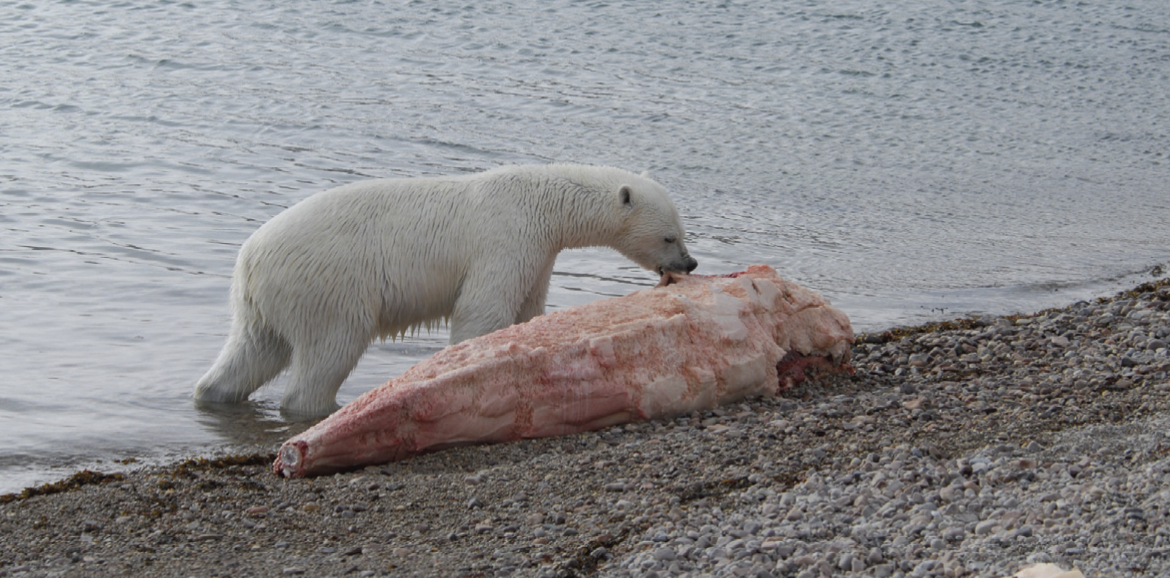
The hypocarnivorous American black bear (Ursus americanus) vs. the hypercarnivorous polar bear (Ursus maritimus)

Some mammals are omnivores and display varying degrees of carnivory and herbivory, generally leaning in favor of one more than the other. Since plants and meat are digested differently, there is a preference for one over the other, as in bears where some species may be mostly carnivorous and others mostly herbivorous. They are grouped into three categories: mesocarnivory (50–70% meat), hypercarnivory (70% and greater of meat), and hypocarnivory (50% or less of meat). The dentition of hypocarnivores consists of dull, triangular carnassial teeth meant for grinding food. Hypercarnivores, however, have conical teeth and sharp carnassials meant for slashing, and in some cases strong jaws for bone-crushing, as in the case of hyenas, allowing them to consume bones; some extinct groups, notably the Machairodontinae, had saber-shaped canines.

Some physiological carnivores consume plant matter and some physiological herbivores consume meat. From a behavioral aspect, this would make them omnivores, but from the physiological standpoint, this may be due to zoopharmacognosy. Physiologically, animals must be able to obtain both energy and nutrients from plant and animal materials to be considered omnivorous. Thus, such animals are still able to be classified as carnivores and herbivores when they are just obtaining nutrients from materials originating from sources that do not seemingly complement their classification. For example, it is well documented that some ungulates such as giraffes, camels, and cattle, will gnaw on bones to consume particular minerals and nutrients. Also, cats, which are generally regarded as obligate carnivores, occasionally eat grass to regurgitate indigestible material (such as hairballs), aid with hemoglobin production, and as a laxative.

Many mammals, in the absence of sufficient food requirements in an environment, suppress their metabolism and conserve energy in a process known as hibernation. In the period preceding hibernation, larger mammals, such as bears, become polyphagic to increase fat stores, whereas smaller mammals prefer to collect and stash food. The slowing of the metabolism is accompanied by a decreased heart and respiratory rate, as well as a drop in internal temperatures, which can be around ambient temperature in some cases. For example, the internal temperatures of hibernating Arctic ground squirrels can drop to −2.9 °C (26.8 °F); however, the head and neck always stay above 0 °C (32 °F). A few mammals in hot environments aestivate in times of drought or extreme heat, for example the fat-tailed dwarf lemur (Cheirogaleus medius).

== See also ==
- Aphagia
- Chewing
- Competitive eating
- Crop
- Dietary supplement
- Dieting
- Dining in, formal military ceremony
- Drinking
- Energy crop
- Fine dining
- Foodways
- Forced feeding
- Muk-bang
- Restaurants
- Swallowing
