= Jewish almond cookie =

Jewish cookie made with almonds

Jewish almond cookie, also known as a Chinese cookie, is a popular Jewish cookie made with almonds. They are commonly served at Jewish delis and eateries.

== History ==
=== Origins ===
In the early 1900s, Chinese restaurants were among the few non-Jewish eateries that allowed Jewish people entry and let them dine on the premises. This, along with the fact that dairy and meat are practically never combined in Chinese cuisine, contributed to the rise in popularity of Chinese cuisine in American Jewish culture. A similar Chinese cookie was likely served at some Chinese restaurants in New York City during this time, and it has been theorized that this was the inspiration for the Jewish almond cookie, and was when this cookie was introduced into American Jewish cuisine.

=== Later history ===
This cookie was adapted to address both Jewish dietary concerns (kosher), as well as the difficulty in procuring ingredients such as almond flour or almond oil at that time. Jewish almond cookies were first made with almond paste (marzipan), and vegetable shortening, instead of the traditional almond flour and liquid oil used in Chinese cookies. This created a smoother, less grainy texture for Jewish almond cookies versus Chinese cookies.

Jewish almond cookies quickly spread in popularity as they are pareve and could be eaten after fleishig meals containing meat. Thus, Jewish almond cookies became a staple of the cookie counter in street Jewish delis across America.

== Overview ==
A Jewish almond cookie is a small, round cookie made with a dough containing flour, almond paste or marzipan, sugar, eggs, baking soda, and vegetable shortening. It is topped with a whole almond in the center of each cookie.

== Variations ==
Jewish almond cookies come in several varieties.

=== Israeli variety ===
Jewish almond cookies are also available in Israel, where they are made with tehina and topped with poppy seeds. The fact that these cookies are available in Israel raises doubts about the claims of a Chinese origin to these cookies, as Chinese cuisine is not commonly found in Israel.

== Availability ==
=== The United States ===
Jewish almond cookies are available at Jewish delicatessens, kosher bakeries, and other Jewish eateries throughout the United States, particularly in the Northeastern United States and Los Angeles.

=== Israel ===
Jewish almond cookies are commonly sold in Israeli bakeries.

== See also ==
- Tahini cookie
- Rainbow cookie
- Chinese cuisine in Jewish culture in the United States
