= Rainbow cookie =

Italian-American cookie

Rainbow Cookie
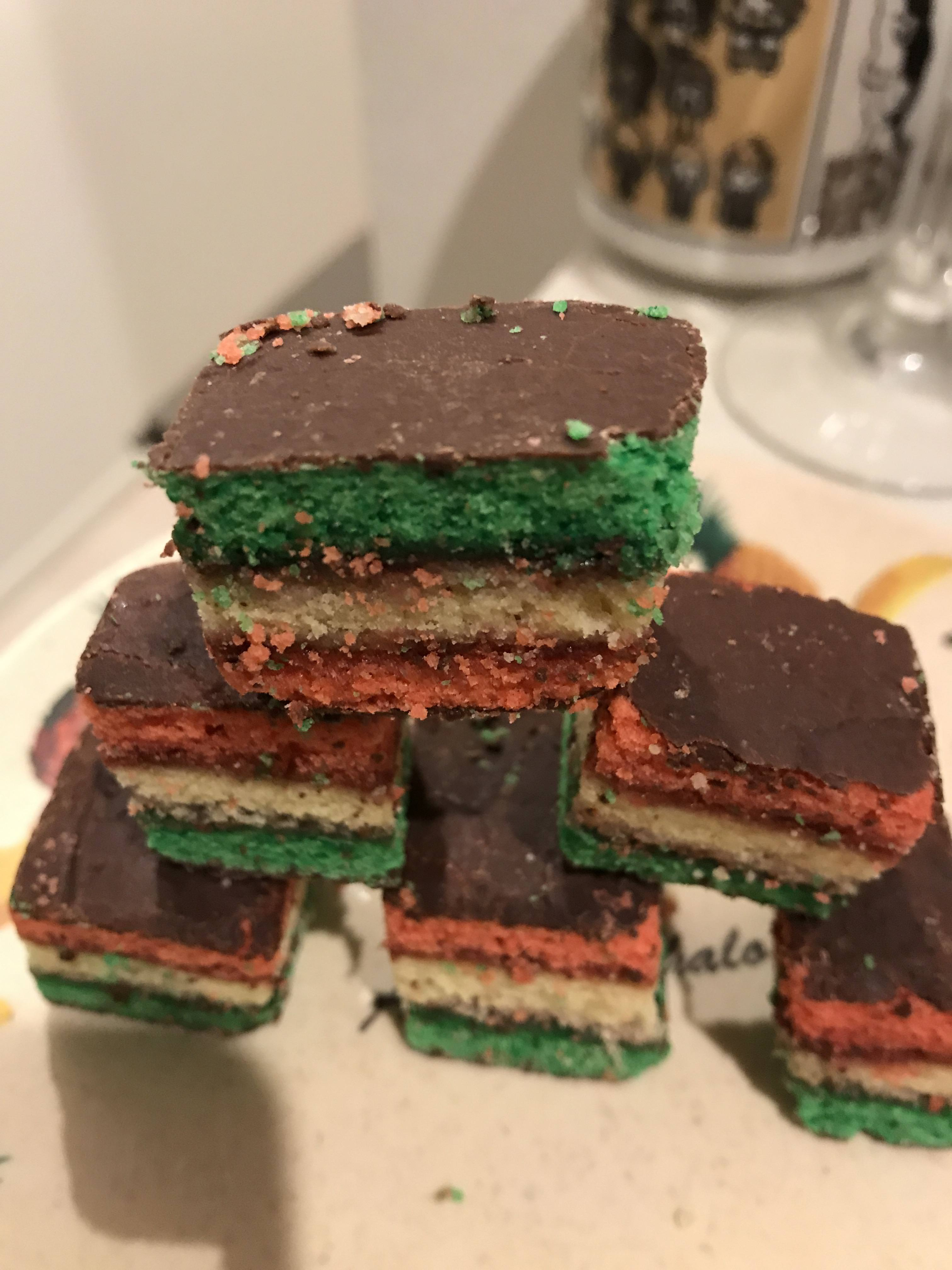
- Alternative names: Rainbow cake, Neapolitan cookies, seven layer cookies, Venetian cookies, seven layer cake, Italian flag cookies, tricolor cookies, tricolore
- Type: Cake
- Place of origin: Italian Americans
- Region or state: New York City
- Main ingredients: Sponge cake (flour, almond paste, butter, sugar, almond extract, egg yolks, egg whites), apricot or raspberry jam, chocolate

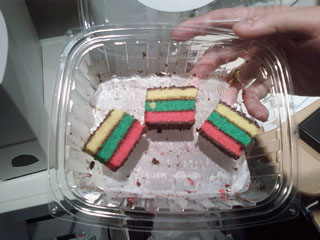
Rainbow cookies

Rainbow cookie or rainbow cake usually refers to a three-layered almond-flavored Italian-American cookie, but can also refer to any of a number of rainbow-colored confections.

== Composition ==
Rainbow cookies are typically composed of layers of brightly colored, almond-based sponge cake (usually almond paste/marzipan), apricot and/or raspberry jam, and a chocolate coating. Commonly referred to as a "cookie," their composition is closer in many ways to a layered cake or petit four. The original rainbow cookie featured layers with colors representing the Italian flag: white, red and green. However, there may be variations in the color of the rainbow cookie's layers, whether for particular holidays, or other events.

== History and origins ==
Rainbow cookies were first introduced by Italian-American bakeries in the late 19th or early 20th century, and have since spread to other Italian-American and mainstream bakeries. Rainbow cookies are particularly popular at Christmas.

Though many Italian confections have an almond paste or almond flour base, rainbow cookies are a decidedly Italian-American creation. While there is no direct analogue to rainbow cookies in Italy, Italian food historian Mary Taylor Simeti speculates that the Italian-American rainbow cookie is based on the tri-colored gelato di campagna, a nougat with the same colored layers.

== Jewish cuisine ==
Rainbow cookies are popular in the American Jewish community, and are commonly associated with American Jewish cuisine and can be found at many Jewish delis, kosher eateries, and Jewish bakeries throughout the United States, especially in the Northeastern United States. As Jewish refugees from Eastern Europe settled in New York City en masse at the turn of the twentieth century, they often settled in areas that also had an Italian population. It was at this point that Jewish Americans were introduced to the rainbow cookie.

They are a common kiddush cookie served on Shabbat morning and at synagogues across the country. There are also versions of rainbow cookies made for Passover, which are made with matzo meal or almond flour (due to the prohibition of leavening during this holiday).

Jewish Americans adapted this cookie to suit their own Kosher dietary needs, substituting margarine for the butter originally used (making them pareve). Other color variations may include blue and white, instead of the traditional rainbow, to celebrate Hanukkah.

== Other names ==
Although often called simply rainbow cookies in much of the continental United States, some local names for this specific variety are:

- Napoleon cookies
- Seven layer cake
- Seven layer cookies
- Tricolor/e cookies
- Venetian cookies

== See also ==
- List of cookies
