= Khobz tounes =

Algerian cake

- Alternative names: Khobz el bey
- Type: Cake
- Place of origin: Algeria
- Main ingredients: Almond meal, breadcrumbs, eggs, butter, sugar, orange flower water

Khobz tounes (Arabic: خبز تونس, lit. 'bread of tounes'), also called khobz el bey (Arabic: خبز الباي, lit. 'bread of the bey'), is an Algerian cake made from almond meal and breadcrumbs, soaked in a syrup flavored with orange flower water. The cake dates from Algeria's Ottoman period. It is commonly consumed during Ramadan.

== See also ==
- List of cakes
