= Simeti =

Simeti is a surname. Notable people with the surname include:

- Mary Taylor Simeti (born 1941), American author
- Turi Simeti (1929–2021), Italian painter
