= Koi Kei Bakery =

Bakery chain in Macau

Koi Kei Bakery 鉅記餅家
- Company type: Bakery, food souvenirs
- Founded: 1997; 29 years ago
- Founder: Leong Chan-Kuong
- Headquarters: Macau, China

Chinese name
- Traditional Chinese: 鉅記餅家
- Simplified Chinese: 钜记饼家
Transcriptions
Standard Mandarin
- Hanyu Pinyin: Jùjì Bǐngjiā
- IPA: [tɕŷ.tɕî pìŋ.tɕjá]
Yue: Cantonese
- Jyutping: geoi^{6}gei^{3} beng^{2}gaa^{1}
- IPA: [kɵɥ˨.kej˧ pɛŋ˧˥.ka˥]

Portuguese name
- Portuguese: Pasteria Koi Kei
- Website: http://www.koikei.com/

Koi Kei Bakery (Chinese: 鉅記餅家; Portuguese: Pastelaria Koi Kei) is a chain of food souvenir shops based in Macau. The bakery is most famous for its peanut brittle and Chinese almond biscuits, but also sells beef jerky, ginger candy, egg rolls, and other pastries and snack products. In 2016, it had a 74.4% share of the pastry souvenir market in Macau. Koi Kei operates 21 stores in Macau, and a branch in the Hong Kong International Airport.

== History ==
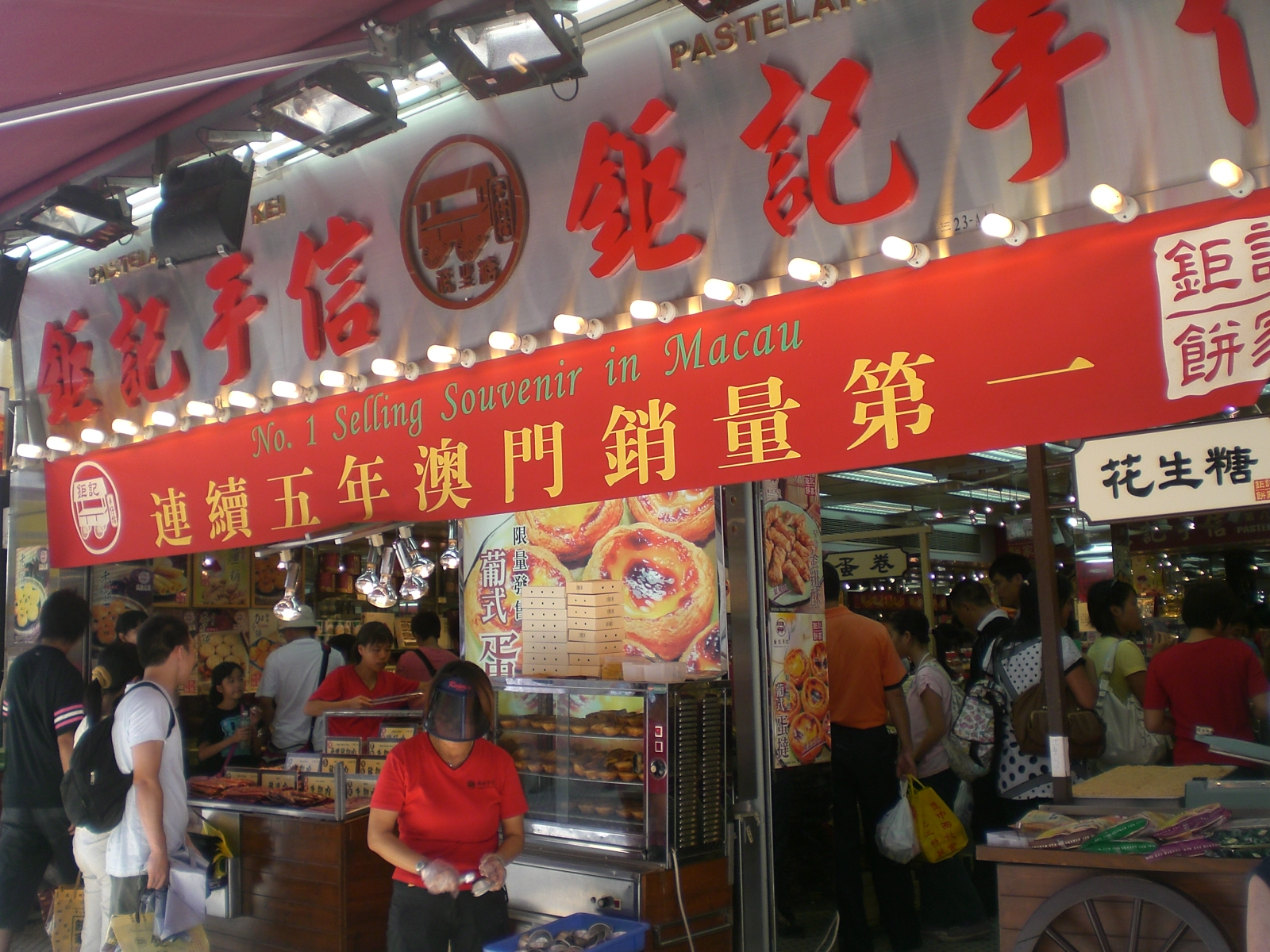
A Koi Kei shop near the Ruins of St. Paul's in Macau.

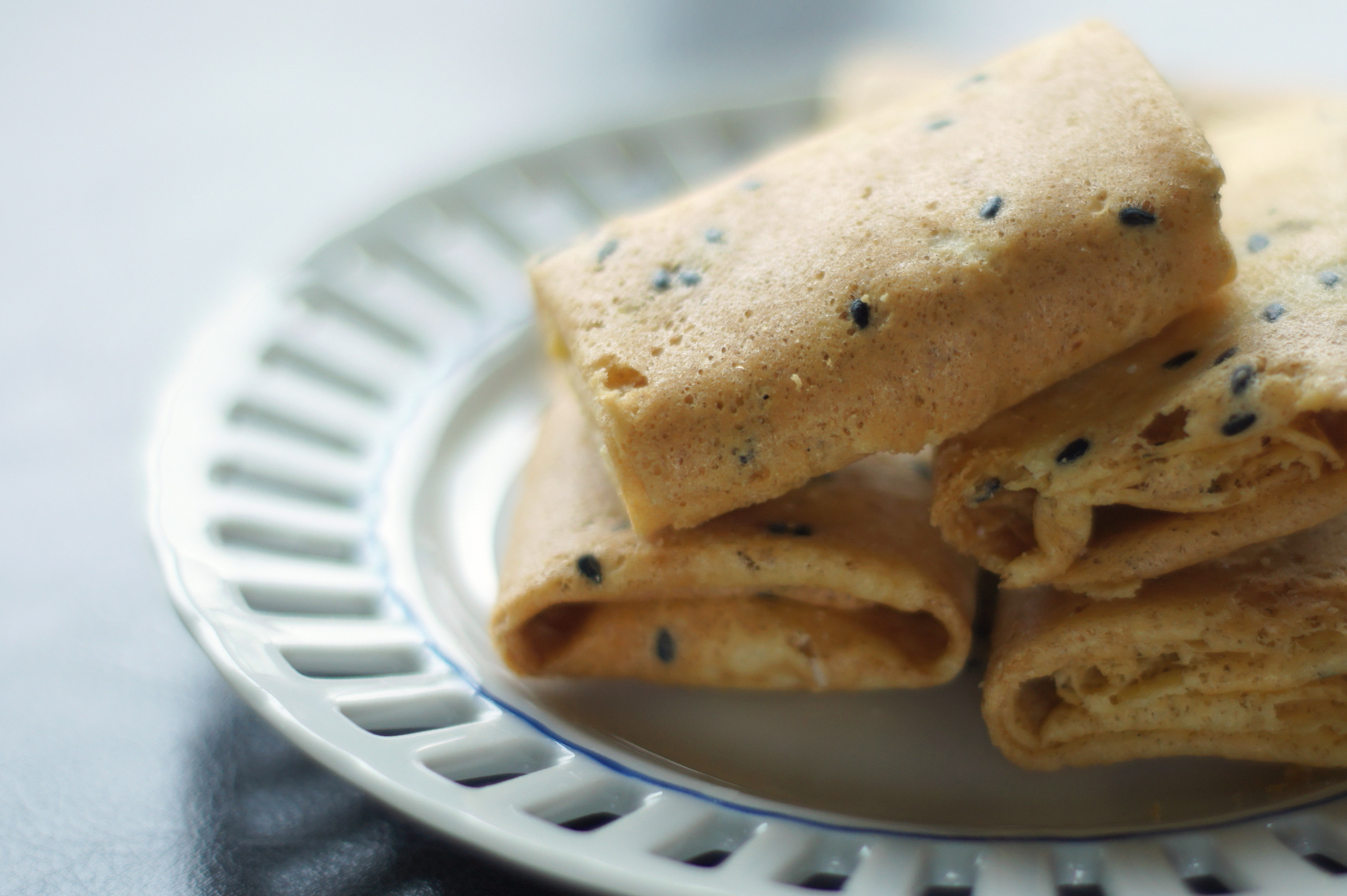
Koi Kei Phoenix Egg Rolls with Black Sesame

Koi Kei was founded by Leoung Chan-Kuong, an immigrant from Foshan, China, who initially started selling peanut brittle and ginger candy on a pushcart in Macau. Leoung's new business did not receive much support from his family, so he had to resort to selling his apartment and borrowing from friends to collect the HK$1.7 million required to start the business. In 1997, he purchased and opened Koi Kei's first store. Leoung frequently crossed paths with triad gangsters, who sought to eliminate industry competition by setting fire to his shop. The company began distributing internationally in 2004.

Starts in 2020, Koi Kei closed three of its branches one after another in Hong Kong due to supply issues caused by the COVID-19 pandemic and HZMB had opened in 2018.

=== Trademark issues ===
Around 2008, Koi Kei applied for an international trademark, which failed only in mainland China because there was another food company in Macau that applied for the "Koi Kei" trademark ahead of Koi Kei Bakery. As the Koi Kei trademark had already been registered in all other countries, the mainland China trademark holder found it difficult to compete with Koi Kei Bakery. Koi Kei ultimately spent over CN¥1,000,000 to acquire its trademark rights in mainland China.

In 2015, Koi Kei announced it was looking into unauthorized uses of its trademark in mainland China and other places, and brought the issue to the Chinese courts. The company does not maintain a presence in mainland China.

== Advertising and sponsorships ==
In 2007, Hong Kong food critic Chua Lam filmed an advertisement for Koi Kei in Macau. He was filmed holding an almond biscuit, taking a bite, and saying: "Koi Kei almond biscuit, tastes like a biscuit. (Chinese: 「鉅記杏仁餅，食餅有餅味。」) The ad triggered a viral response online, causing the phrase "biscuit tastes like a biscuit" (Chinese: 食餅有餅味) to become synonymous with the Koi Kei brand.

Since 2010, Koi Kei has sponsored ATV production Who's the Hero, TVB productions such as Gun Metal Grey and Lord of Shanghai. The 2013 TVB drama Brother's Keeper is based on the story of Koi Kei bakery. Edwin Siu was cast as a character based on Leong Chan-Kuong, the company's founder, and Kristal Tin was cast as Koi Kei's general manager. Edwin Siu has since become a brand ambassador for Koi Kei.
