= Calisson =

Traditional candy from Aix-en-Provence

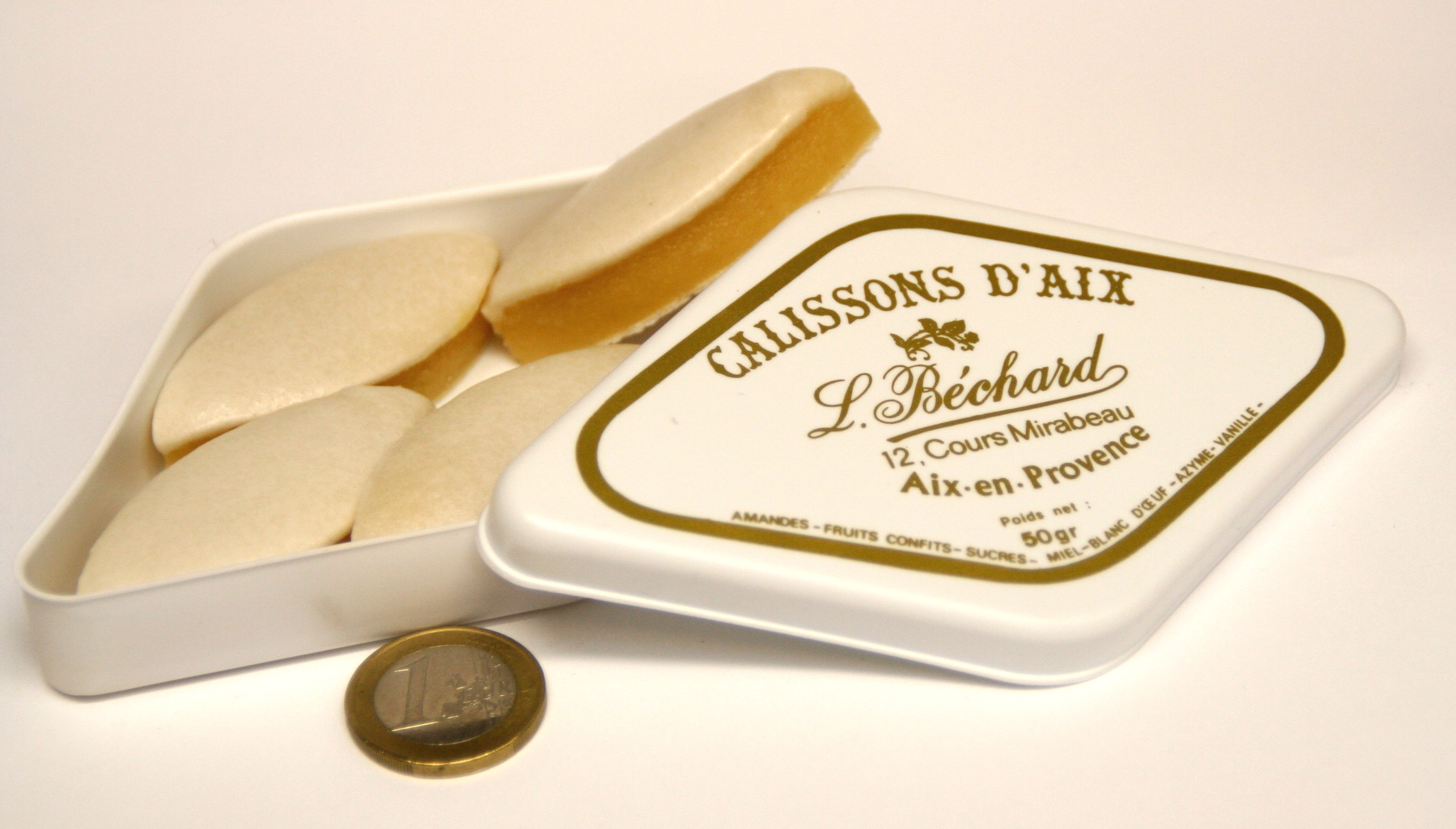
- Alternative names: canisson, canissoun
- Type: Confectionery
- Place of origin: France
- Serving temperature: cold
- Main ingredients: candied fruit (especially melons and oranges), almond meal or flour, fondant

Calissons are a traditional French candy consisting of a smooth, pale yellow, homogeneous paste of candied fruit (especially melons and oranges) and ground almonds topped with a thin layer of royal icing. They have a texture similar to that of marzipan, but with a fruitier, distinctly melon-like flavour. They are often almond-shaped and are typically about five centimeters (two inches) in length.

Calissons are traditionally associated with the town of Aix-en-Provence, France, and most of the world's supply is still made in the Provence region.

== History ==
The calisson is believed to have its origins in south of France. The most probable etymology of its name, as established by the sociolinguist Philippe Blanchet in 1998, is that the Provençal word calissoun is formed from "calice" and the diminutive suffix "-oun", literally meaning "small chalice". The name has been interpreted as referring both to the confection's small size and to its sacred origins in the Eucharist. In Provençal, the word for "chalice" originally denoted the Eucharistic cup, and later came to denote the rite of Holy Communion itself. Since the Eucharist consists of the consecrated wine in the chalice and the consecrated bread (the host), the calisson's ceremonial distribution has traditionally been compared to that of the host.

The precise origin of the calisson remains uncertain, but confections bearing similar names are attested in the Mediterranean several centuries before the sweet became associated with Aix-en-Provence. A 12th-century medieval Latin text from Padua uses the term calisone to describe an almond-and-flour cake resembling marzipan. The earliest known literary reference to calissons in vernacular Romance languages appears in the Estoires de Venise, written in French around 1275 by the Venetian chronicler Martino da Canal, who mentions a confection of that name without describing it.

The word calisson has been cited as being first attested in Provençal with its modern meaning from the early 16th century. The Provençal lexicographer Pierre Pansier recorded the form calisçon in a text dating from 1503, glossing it as a type of confectionery. However, this attestation is preserved through Pansier's lexicographical work rather than through a surviving dated text containing the word; historian Noël Coulet noted that the underlying document cited has not been identified.

A popular legend traces the introduction of calissons to Provence around the mid-15th century. According to most versions of the story, it was during the wedding celebrations for King René of Anjou, who married his second wife Jeanne de Laval in 1454, that the confection was made for the young Queen. This piece of folklore attributes the popularization of this sweet to her approval, and its name to her comment that these were "hugs" or "kisses" (di calin soun). Others suggest that it was not introduced in its modern form until the 16th century, as this was when almonds became an established crop in Aix-en-Provence.

The Bénédiction des Calissons ("Blessing of the Calissons"), held annually in the beginning of September at the Église Saint-Jean-de-Malte in Aix-en-Provence, commemorates a vow made in 1630 at the Cathedral of Saint-Sauveur. It instituted an annual mass of thanksgiving to the protectress of Aix, the Virgin of Seds, for deliverance from a plague outbreak. As part of this vow, blessed calissons are distributed in Aix on this occasion, to the cries of "Venès tóutei pèr lei calissoun" ("Come all for calissons"). They are also distributed to the faithful during Christmas and Easter services. Calissons have since become part of les 13 desserts de Provence ("the thirteen desserts of Provence").

== Legal protections ==
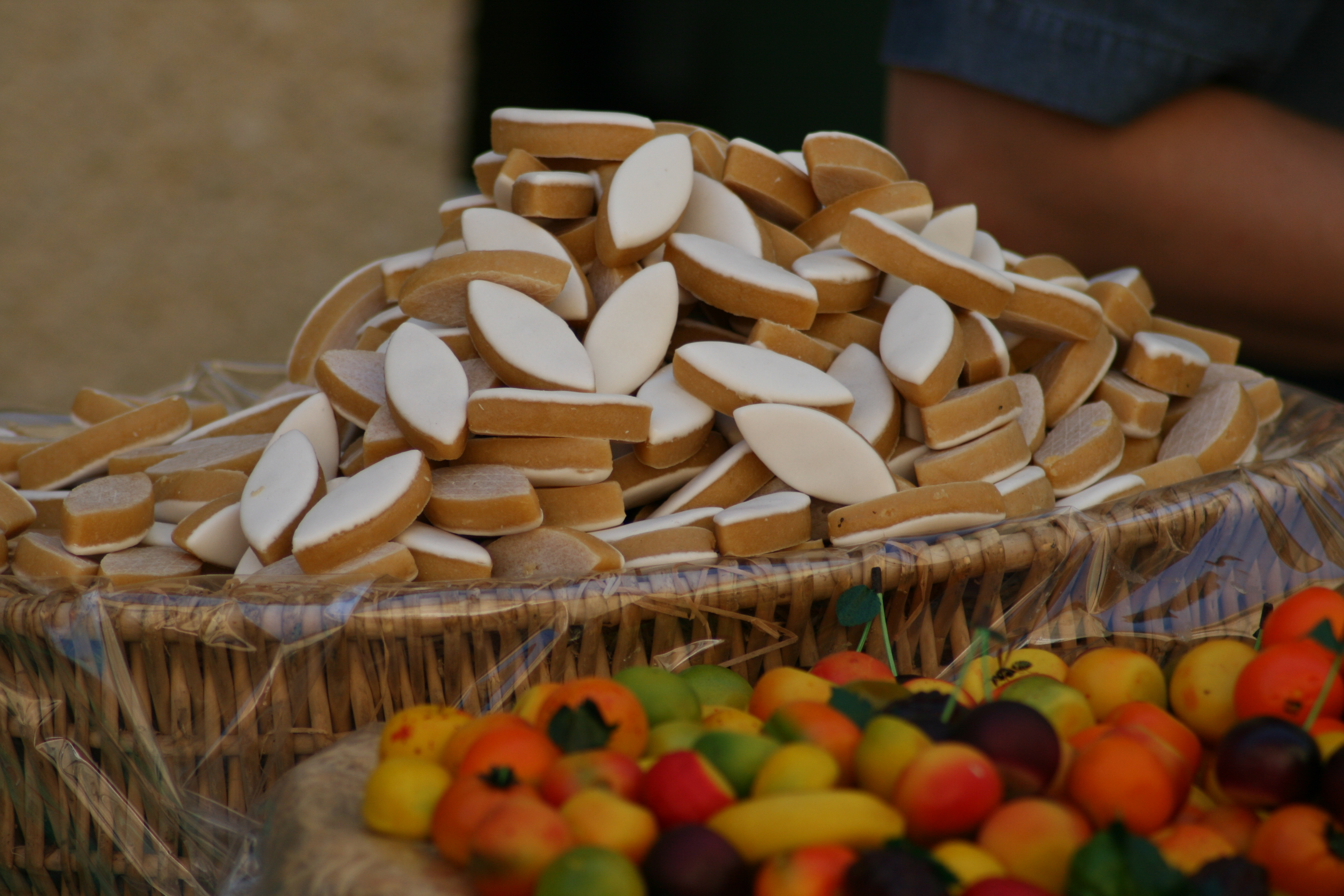
Calissons in Châteauneuf-du-Pape

The status of calisson d'Aix has been protected in France since 1991, requiring local manufacturers to follow specific production methods. This protection, however, applies only within France. The Union of Calisson Manufacturers of Aix-en-Provence sought international protection, but had been unable to reach an agreement on the precise ingredients and specifications of the traditional recipe.

To prevent foreign companies from using the name Calisson d'Aix, the union applied for a Protected Geographical Indication (PGI) in 2015, effective within the EU. However, the application came after a Chinese company had already registered its Chinese transliteration, "Kalisong" (simplified Chinese: 卡丽松; traditional Chinese: 卡麗松; pinyin: Kǎlìsōng), as a trademark in China. In 2016, the French union began legal proceedings to challenge the registration. In 2017, China's Trademark Office rejected the claim of exclusive rights to the name, stating that registration of the mark would mislead the Chinese public about the geographical origin of the products, thereby preventing the Chinese company from registering the trademark.

== See also ==
- List of almond dishes
