= Gevulde koek =

Dutch pastry

An artisan gevulde koek from a bakery

Gevulde koek ("filled cake") is a Dutch pastry, consisting of a rich almond paste filling encased in buttery shortcrust pastry. Typically around 10 cm in diameter, it is often decorated with 1–5 whole or halved almonds atop. Artisan bakers tend to use more almonds than mass-market versions.

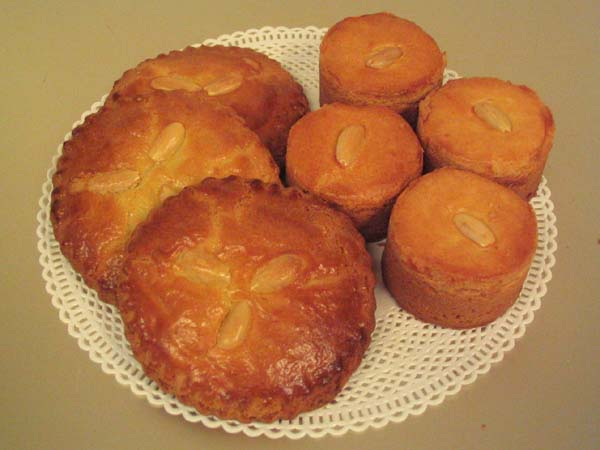
Commercially produced gevulde koek and rondo with a filling of persipan.

The almond paste found in artisanal or in-store bakery products use a blend of ground almonds, sugar, egg yolk, and lemon zest. In contrast, mass-produced supermarket packages frequently use cheaper persipan, a pastry paste that may include vegetable fats, sugar, apricot kernels, or legume pastes instead of almonds.

== History ==
The use of almond paste in Dutch cuisine dates back to the early 16th century: a Dutch recipe from Brussels in around 1510 mentions almond paste, indicating early origins of enriched pastries. The origins of the round, filled cookie as known today is not precisely known. Since then, it has become a staple of Dutch bakery culture, regularly featured in bakery counters, train kiosks, and café offerings. The gevulde koek is closely associated with the Dutch coffee break tradition (koffietijd), commonly consumed with coffee or tea.

== Variants ==
The rondo, or vulkoek or herenkoek, is like the gevulde koek also round but smaller in diameter than the gevulde koek. It is often industrially produced and noticeably thicker than the gevulde koek, as it has upright edges forming a shallow, higher shell filled with persipan or almond paste and covered with a thin dough layer on top. The kano is an elongated, narrower variant of the rondo with rounded ends and similar upright edges.

A seasonal variation inspired by the gevulde koek is the gevulde speculaaskoek, which combines spiced speculaas dough with almond paste filling. This variant is popular around the Sinterklaas holiday and offers a spiced twist on the traditional almond-filled treat.
