= Choi Heong Yuen Bakery =

Two independently-operated bakeries in Macau and Hong Kong

- Native name: 咀香園餅家
- Industry: Bakery
- Founded: 1931
- Founder: Wong Kee-sin
- Headquarters: Macau, China

Choi Heong Yuen Bakery (咀香園餅家) is the name of two independently-operated bakeries in Macau and Hong Kong. Founded in Macau 1935, the bakery has since become one of the three major bakeries known locally for almond cookies—the other two being Koi Kei and Yeng Kee. A branch opened in Hong Kong in 1961, which later became independent and centred in a trademark dispute with the Macau store.

== History ==
=== History ===
Choi Heong Yuen Bakery was founded in Macau in 1935 by Wong Kee-sin, who opened its first store on Travessa do Auto Novo in Macau. The bakery initially targeted travellers boarding and disembarking nearby piers. Wong subsequently opened another store on King's Road in Hong Kong in 1961, which was later inherited by his daughter, Wong Siu-ji. Following the Hong Kong store's independent operations, it became known into English as the Chui Heung Yuen Bakery. The bakeries, along with its two rivals in Macau—the Koi Kei and Yeng Kee bakeries—have been reportedly noted for their almond cookies, a type of biscuit now reportedly considered as a popular souvenir in Macau.

Following the passing of the elder Wong, the store was handed over to his nephew, Wong Wing-cheung in the 1960s, before being further passed down in 1993 to the third generation Wong Joek-lai. In 1997, the Macanese bakery began exporting its cookies as a result of poor financial situation of the time, and revamped its stores to consolidate its brand image. In early 2000, the Wong Siu-ji-led Hong Kong bakery followed a similar export strategy, but focusing on the Taiwanese market.

=== Mainland China operations ===
Written in Chinese, the bakery shares the same characters as the unrelated Zhongshan-based Ju Xiang Yuan Bakery that was founded in 1918. To avoid trademark disputes, the Macanese entity of Choi Heong Yuen operates as the 'October Fifth bakery' in the People's Republic of China.

== Trademark disputes between the Hong Kong and Macau bakeries ==
In August 2007, the Hong Kong bakery's Wong Siu-li filed a trademark complaint with the Hong Kong High Court, alleging that her nephew, who operated Choi Heong Yuen in Macau, violated her Hong Kong trademark rights for “Chui Heung" and “Chui Heung Yuen" when the Macanese bakery participated in the Hong Kong Food Expo (at which the Hong Kong bakery did not participate). A litigation was initiated and the judge issued a temporary injunction order to prevent the nephew from participating in the Food Expo to promote Macau's Choi Heong Yuen.

== See also ==
- Tourism in Macau
