= Aphagia =

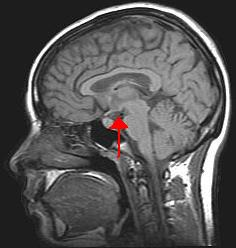
- Arrow pointing to hypothalamus in human brain. The hypothalamus is responsible for controlling food intake and swallowing.
- Specialty: Gastroenterology
- Complications: Malnutrition, metabolic disorders

Aphagia is the inability or refusal to swallow. The word is derived from the Ancient Greek prefix α, meaning "not" or "without," and the suffix φαγία, derived from the verb φαγεῖν, meaning "to eat." It is related to dysphagia which is difficulty swallowing (Greek prefix δυσ, dys, meaning difficult, or defective), and odynophagia, painful swallowing (from ὀδύνη, odyn(o), meaning "pain"). Aphagia may be temporary or long term, depending on the affected organ. It is an extreme, life-threatening case of dysphagia. Depending on the cause, untreated dysphagia may develop into aphagia.

== Behavioural classification ==
The following behavioural classifications result from studies performed on rats, in which lesions were made on the lateral hypothalamus region in the brain.

1. Passive aphagia: An animal with passive aphagia will not respond to food if it is presented. However, if food is inserted into the mouth, the animal will chew.
2. Active aphagia: Active aphagia is a complete rejection of food. The animal will physically push food away or move its head from it. One might first sample the food by smelling or tasting, then spit out anything in the mouth. Afterwards the animal will show a complete repulsion to the food. The animal reacts to food as if it is bitter or foul.
3. Mixed aphagia: When presented with food, the animal initially does not react positively or negatively. However, when food is placed in the mouth, the animal demonstrates active aphagia, spitting out the food and refusing to eat thereafter.

These studies point to the function of the hypothalamus in regulating food intake. Animals in this study also demonstrated several other types of eating behaviour: "weak eating," in which the animal slowly approaches, chews, and swallows small observable amounts of food for a brief period; "good eating," in which the animal reaches normally for the food and eats reliably; and "vigorous eating," in which the animal gluttonously reaches for and devours the food. In these cases, there was either minor or no damage to the lateral hypothalamus.

Aphagia not classified under behavioral aphagia typically has a structural cause, see causes.

== Causes ==
Aphagia is usually the result of many different diseases as well as different medical treatments. The most common causes of aphagia are:

- Aesophageal cancer – there are two types of aesophageal cancer. The squamous cell cancer from the squamous cells of the tongue or the adenocarcinoma from glandular cells present at the junction of the esophagus and stomach. This leads to a local tumour growth with spreading later. This spreading may lead to larger tumors that would result in the inability to swallow.
- Aesophageal webs – thin membranes located in the esophagus. Abnormalities can cause constrictions within the esophagus.
- Globus pharyngeus – commonly referred to as lumps in one's throat
- Myasthenia gravis – the thymus gland is thought to be necessary for the deletion of auto-reactive T cells, and seems to have an important role in the pathogenesis of myasthenia gravis. In patients the thymus is typically enlarged, and contains many germinal centres with T and B cell areas very similar to those seen in lymph nodes. The tumour in thymoma associated disease is typically epithelial in nature.
- Facioscapulohumeral muscular dystrophy – even though there is not a clear correlation between the facioscapulohumeral muscular dystrophy and the pharyngeal and upper aesophageal striated muscle. Minor, and nonspecific, primary aesophageal dysmotility was present as seen in the 2008 study by Joerg-Patrick Stübgen.
- Multiple sclerosis – may lead to aesophageal dysmotility
- Chemotherapy – radiation from cancer therapy may cause a stricture of the throat leading to the inability to swallow.
- Stroke – swallowing problems can cause stroke victims to aspirate food or liquid into the lungs and cause pneumonia mostly in elderly people.
- Parkinson's disease – the mechanism of swallowing disorders in Parkinson's disease may be related to extrapyramidal and autonomic system disorders. The cardinal symptoms of Parkinson's disease: tremor, bradykinesia, and rigidity are initially responsible for swallowing, which is mainly observed in the advanced stages of the disease
- Damage to the lateral hypothalamus can also lead to aphagia, as seen in the 1978 study by Timothy Schallert and Ian Whishaw.
- Other causes might be due to depression, cervical spine disease and conversion disorders.

All these causes (except due to the damage of the lateral hypothalamus) are indirect.

== Diagnosis ==
- A bedside swallow evaluation is a test to evaluate dysphagia in patients with difficulty swallowing. During this exam the healthcare provider will evaluate the muscles used to swallow. They will then analyze the patient's ability to swallow different substances. This test is helpful in assessing a patient's risk for aspiration. A bedside swallow test is a fast low risk examination that can be helpful in identifying many health problems such as stroke, major dental problems, progressive neurologic disorders, and muscular dystrophies.
- Modified barium swallow – videofluoroscopic swallow (fluoroscopy). A lateral video X-ray that provides objective information on bolus transport, safest consistency of bolus, and possible head positioning and maneuvers that may facilitate swallow function depending on each individual's anatomy and physiology. Barium is used to view certain areas of the GI tract more clearly, as well as to evaluate how a patient swallows and identify any abnormalities. This test is often used to identify abnormalities in the upper GI tract such as cancer, hiatal hernias, structural problems (diverticula, strictures, polyps), enlarged veins, and muscle disorders.
- Esophagogastroduodenoscopy – a diagnostic endoscopic procedure that is used to visualize, diagnose, and treat problems in the upper part of the gastrointestinal tract. This procedure utilizes a long flexible tube known as an endoscope. The endoscope has a light and video camera at one end and is advanced through the patient's mouth and slowly moves though the patient's esophagus, stomach, and duodenum. Images are viewed on the monitor. This procedure can be helpful in making diagnoses of gastroesophageal reflux disease, identifying strictures, esophageal varices, or ulcers. An EGD can also be used to control bleeding, remove tumors or growths, dilate narrowed areas, and remove food that gets stuck.
- Esophageal Manometry is a test used to examine the coordinated muscle movement of the esophagus. A flexible and pressure-sensitive catheter is utilized to measure the pressure created by the muscles of the esophagus, specifically at the upper and lower esophageal sphincters, which control how food enters and exits the esophagus. This procedure is useful in identifying and diagnosing conditions such as achalasia, diffuse esophageal spasm, and scleroderma.

== Treatment ==
The treatment of dysphagia is tailored towards the underlying etiology and individualized based on patient characteristics. Swallowing rehabilitation, including strengthening exercises and skills-based training, can be done by speech therapists.
