= Almond paste =

Filling made from almonds and used in pastries

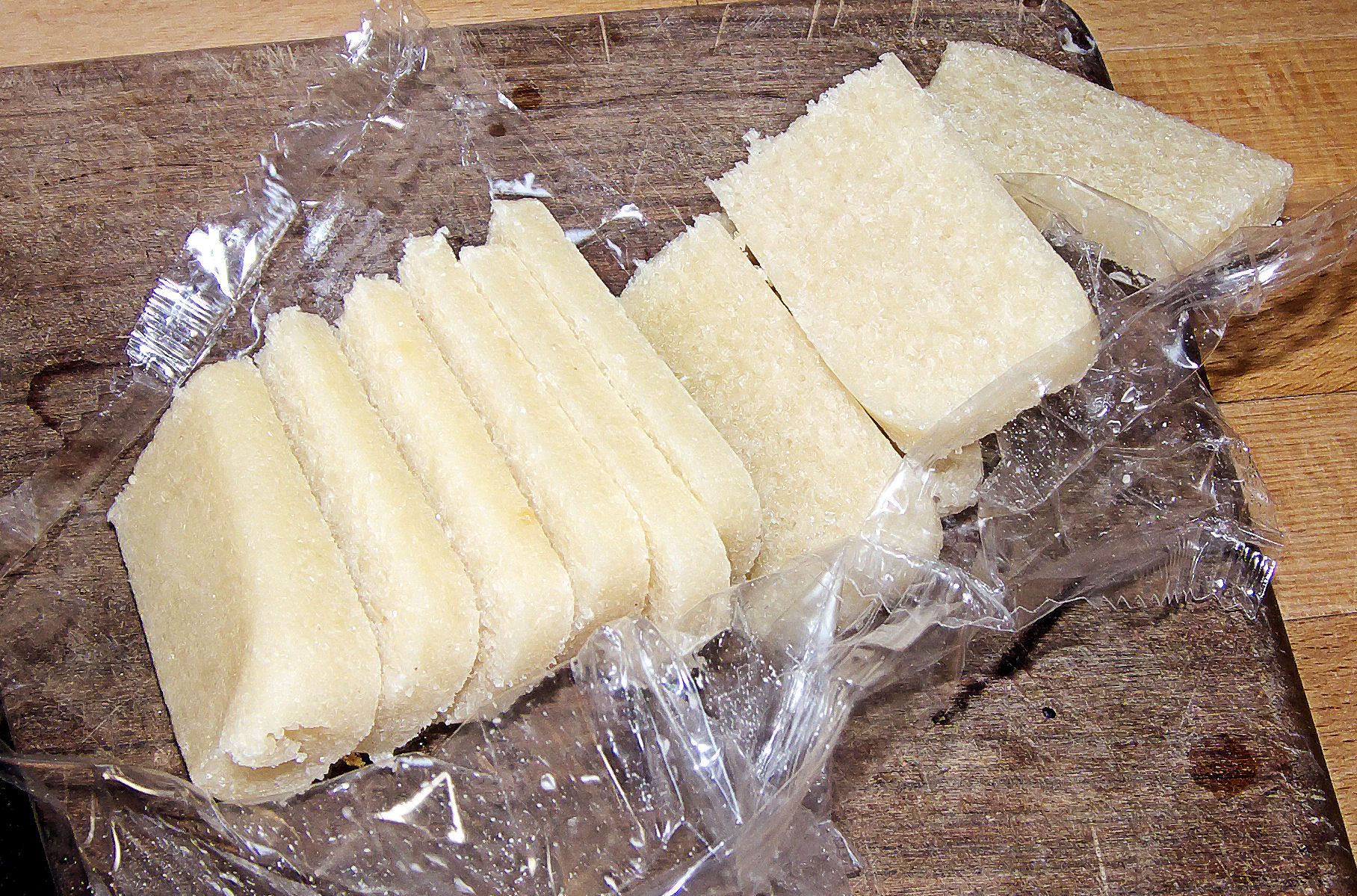
Almond paste

Almond paste is made from ground almonds or almond meal and sugar in equal quantities, with small amounts of cooking oil, eggs, heavy cream or corn syrup added as a binder. It is similar to marzipan, with a coarser texture. Almond paste is used as a filling in pastries, but it can also be found in chocolates. In a type of commercially manufactured almond paste called persipan, ground apricot or peach pits are added to save money.

== Uses ==
Almond paste is used as a filling in pastries of many different cultures. It is a chief ingredient of the American bear claw pastry. In the Nordic countries almond paste is used extensively, in various pastries and cookies. In Sweden (where it is known as mandelmassa) it is used in biscuits, muffins and buns and as a filling in the traditional Shrove Tuesday pastry semla and is used in Easter and Christmas sweets. In Denmark (where it is known as marcipan or mandelmasse), almond paste is used in several pastries, for example as a filling in the Danish traditional pastry kringle. In Finland almond paste is called mantelimassa.

In the Netherlands, almond paste is called amandelspijs and is used in pastries such as the gevulde koek.

In Germany, almond paste is also used in pastries and sweets. In German, almond paste is known as Marzipanrohmasse.

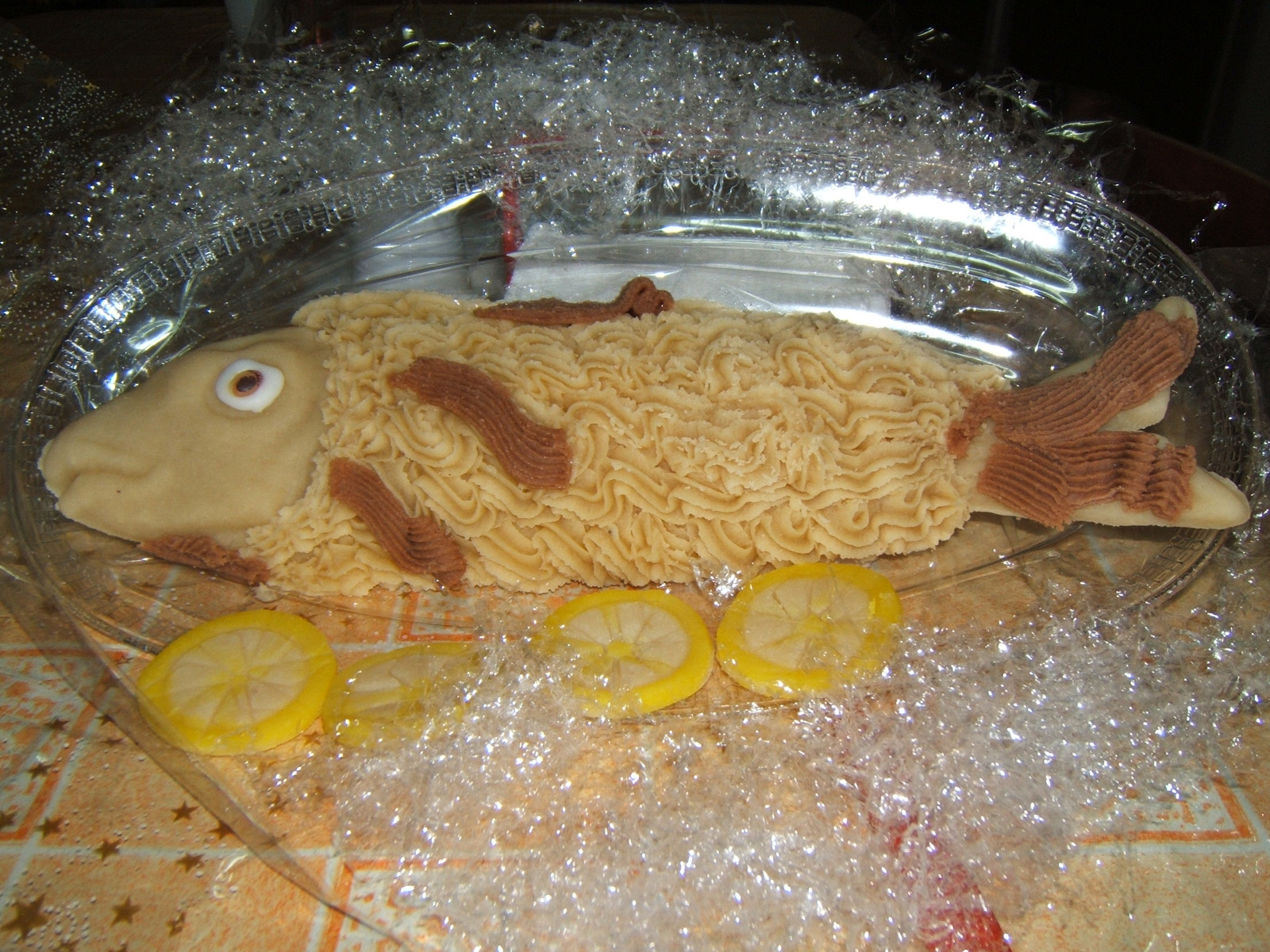
Almond paste fish (a typical Salento Christmas food)

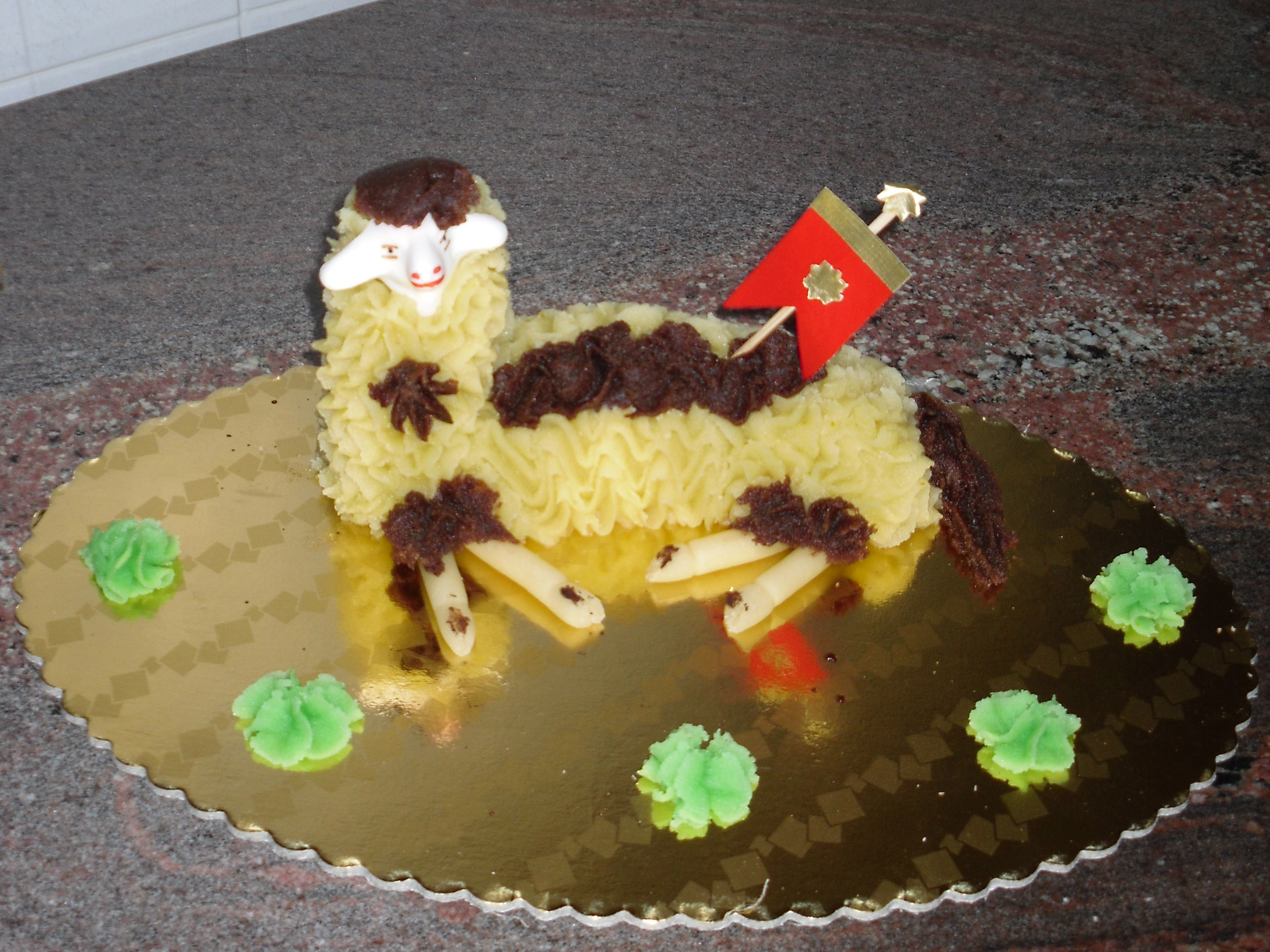
Almond paste lamb (a typical Salento Easter food)

In Italy it is known as "pasta di mandorle". The soft paste is molded into creative shapes by pastry chefs which can be used as cake decorations or to make frutta martorana.

Almond paste is the main ingredient of the traditional French calisson candy in Aix-en-Provence.

In Turkey, almond paste is traditionally made in Edirne.

== See also ==
- Rainbow cookie
- Marzipan
- Almond meal
- Almond butter
