= Global Cosmopolitans =

Global Cosmopolitans refers to "a talented population of highly educated multilingual people that have lived, worked and studied for extensive periods in different cultures. While their international identities have diverse starting points and experiences, their views of the world and themselves are profoundly affected by both the realities of living in different cultures and their manner of coping with the challenges that emerge.".

The term was developed by Linda Brimm, Professor of Organizational Behavior at INSEAD and further explored in her book Global Cosmopolitans: The Creative Edge of Difference .

== See also ==
- Cosmopolitanism
- Global citizenship
- New Man (utopian concept)
- World Citizen
