= Almond biscuit =

Food made with flour and almonds

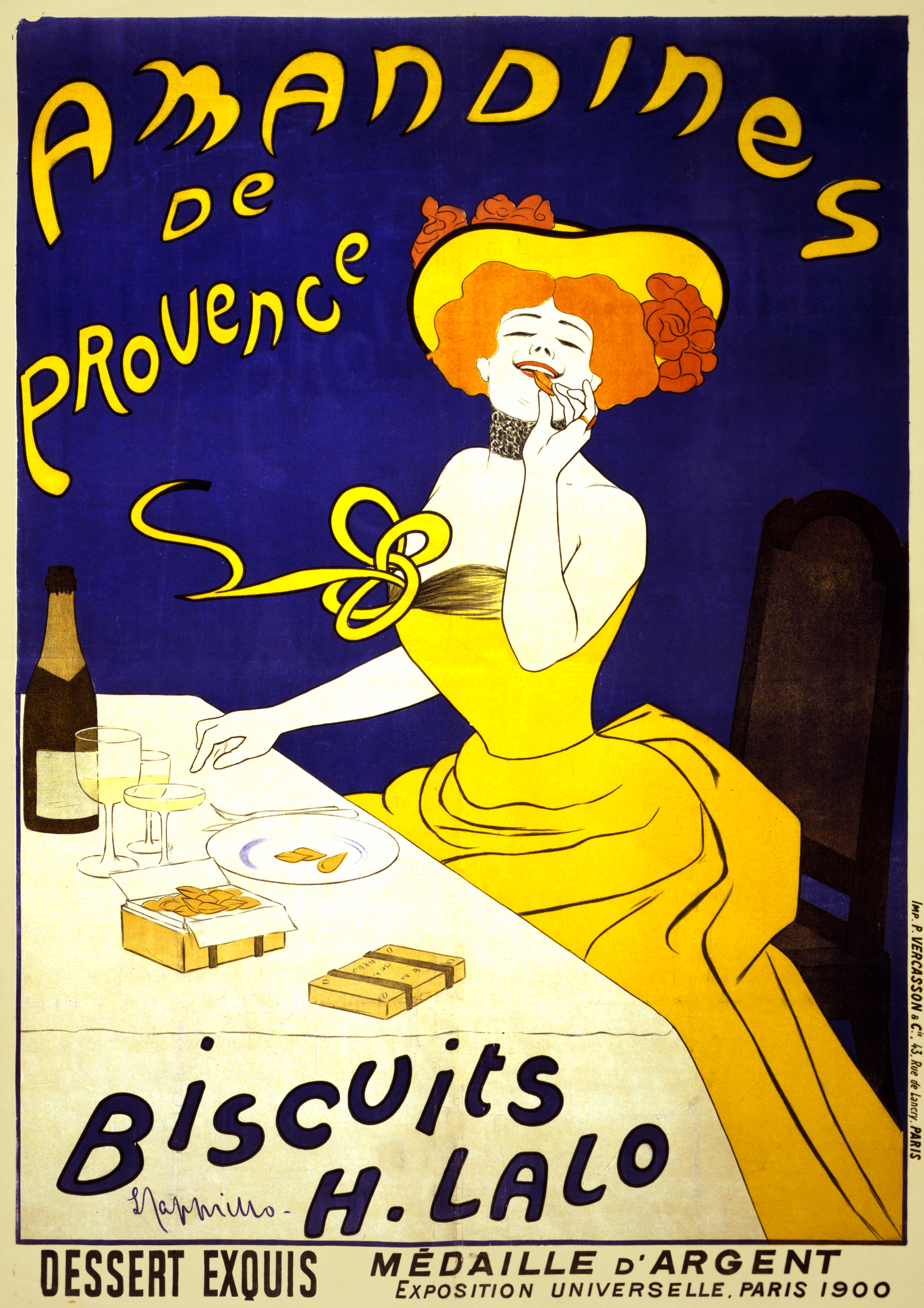
Amandines de Provence, a poster by Leonetto Cappiello, 1900, which shows a woman eating almond biscuits

An almond biscuit, or almond cookie, is a type of biscuit that is made with almonds. They are a common biscuit in many different cuisines and take many forms. Types of almond biscuits include almond macaroons, Italian amaretti, Spanish almendrados, Armenian nshablits (Armenian: նաշաբլիթ), qurabiya (a shortbread biscuit made with almonds), and Moroccan biscuits and desserts. In addition, Turkish şekerpare are often decorated with an almond.

In Norway, sandbakelse or sandkake are a type of almond cookie that is baked in fluted tins.

In Indonesia, almond crispy cheese is a type of crispy flat almond cookie with almond and cheese on top.

In Turkey, Acıbadem kurabiyesi is made of almonds, sugar and egg whites. The traditional recipes include a small amount of bitter almonds, which gives this cookie its name. However, because bitter almonds are not readily available, almond extract is typically used as a substitute.

Many types are crisp; some, such as the Italian amaretti morbidi, are soft and chewy.

== Gallery ==
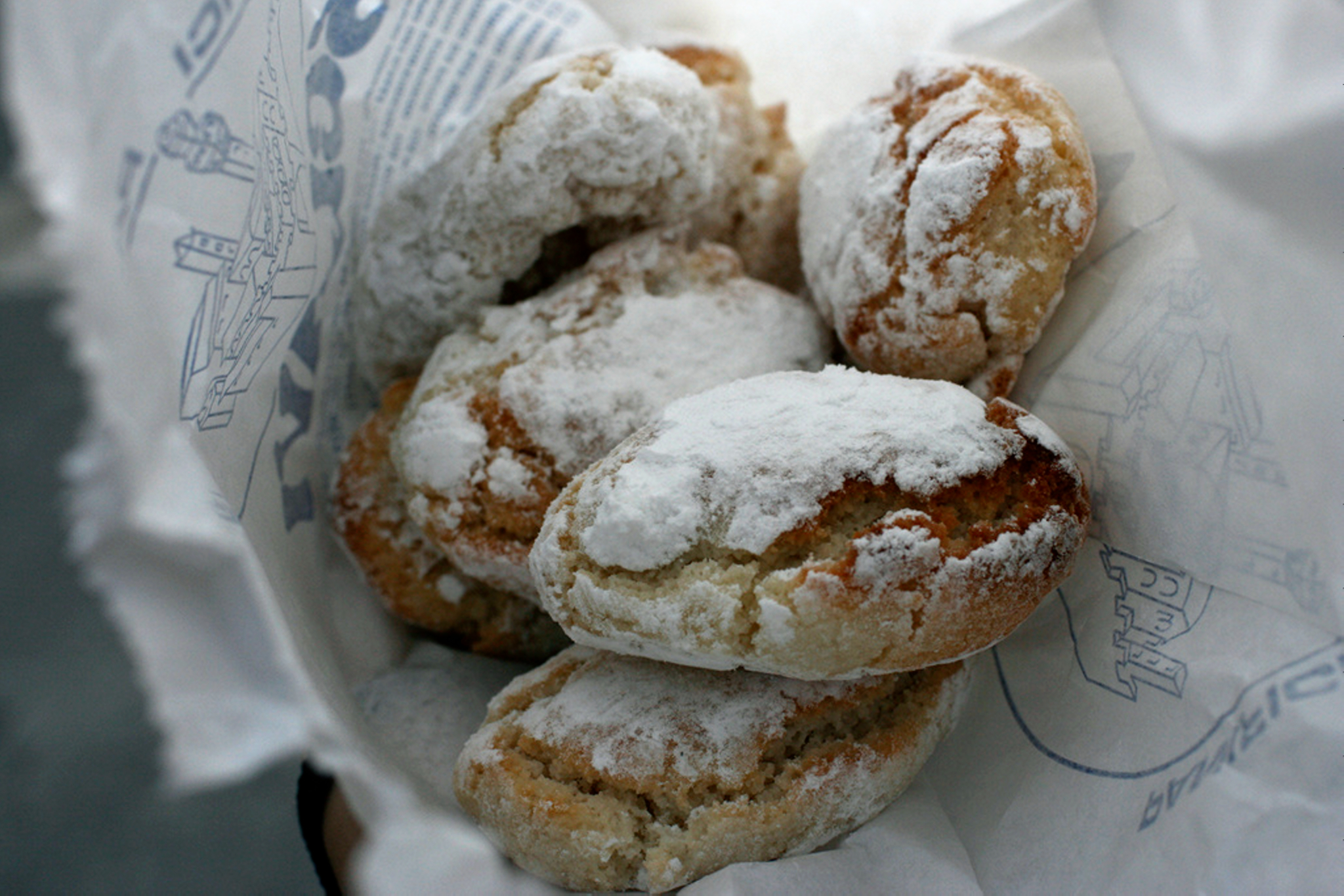
Ricciarelli are a Tuscan almond biscuit.

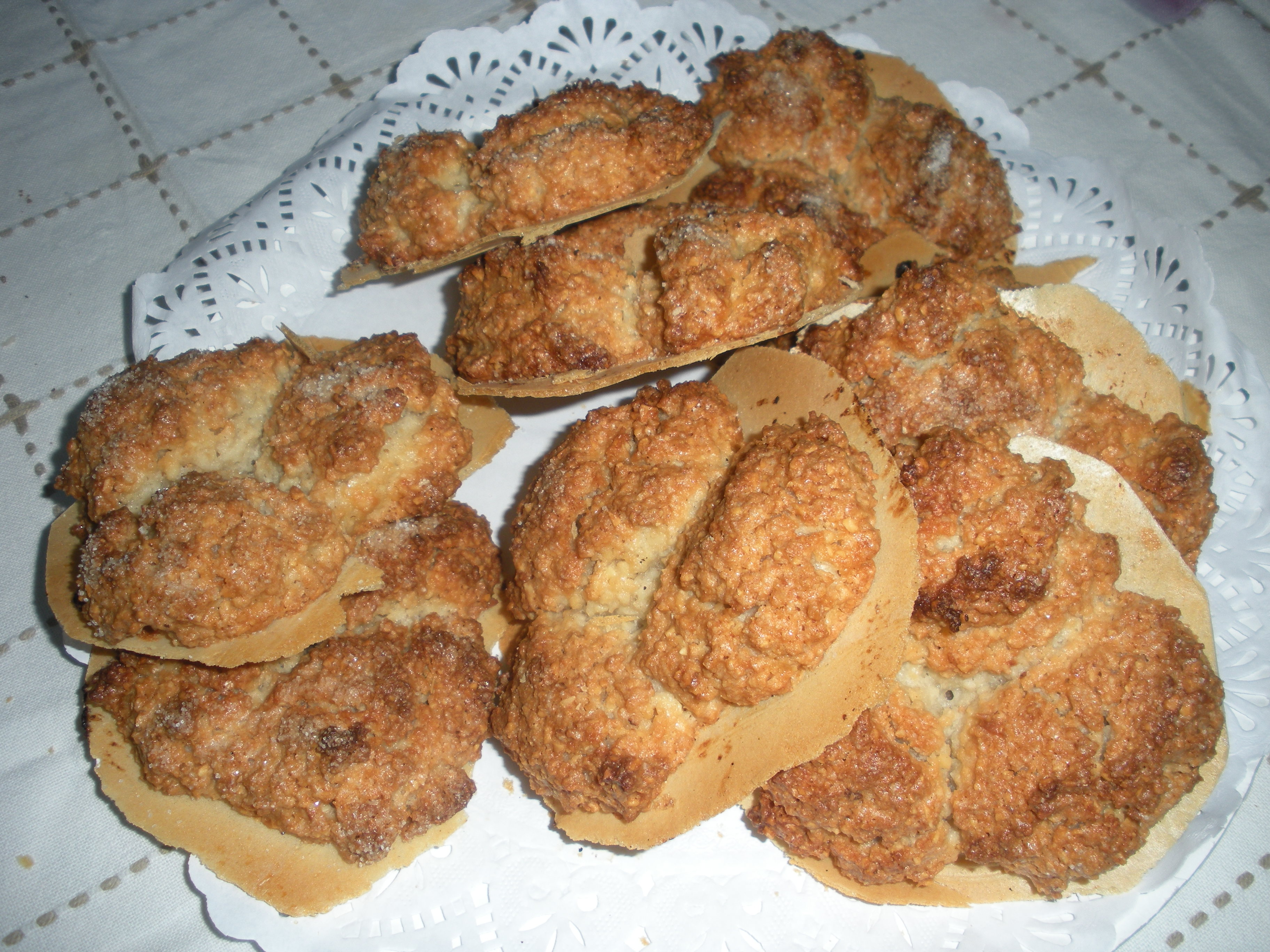
Almendrados are a type of almond biscuit in Spanish cuisine.

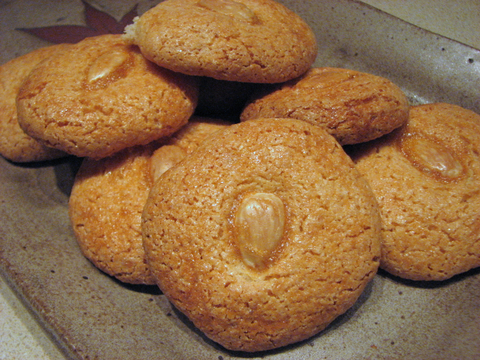
Acibadem kurabiyesi is an almond biscuit in Turkish cuisine.

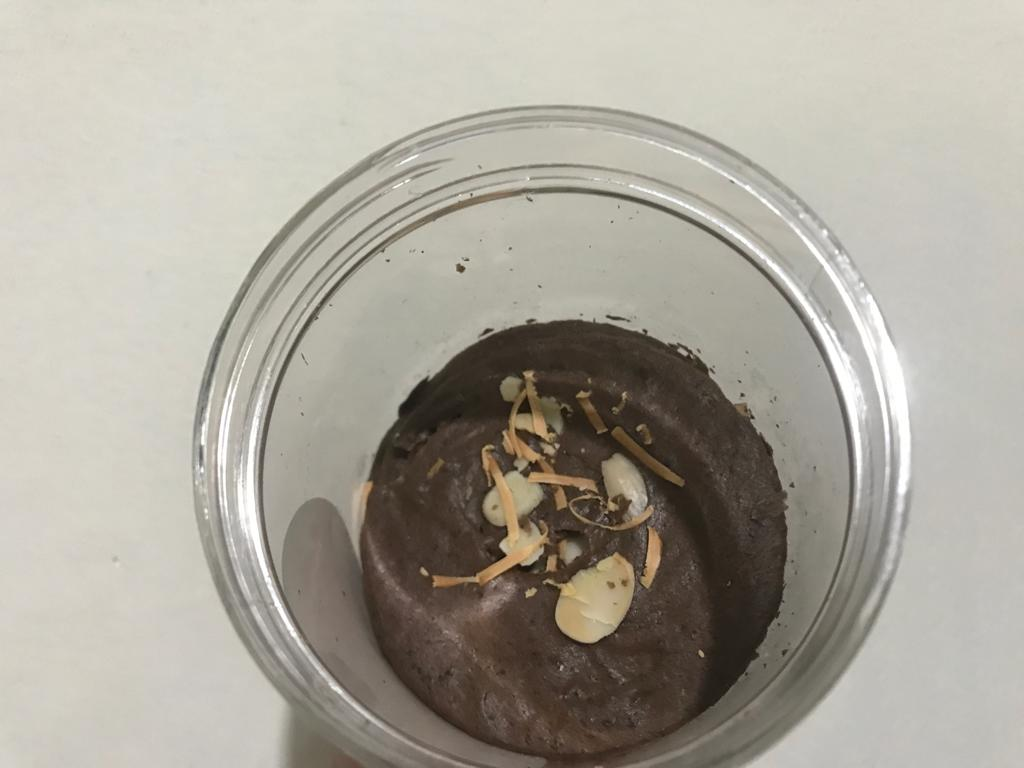
Almond crispy cheese is one of the almond biscuits in Indonesian cuisine.

== See also ==
- Almond paste
- Jewish almond cookie
- Macaroon
- List of almond dishes
- List of cookies
- List of pastries
