= Mary Taylor Simeti =

American author

Mary Taylor Simeti is an American author specializing in Sicilian cuisine and its history. She is a former regular contributor to the New York Times and to the Financial Times.

== Biography ==
Mary Taylor Simeti was born in 1941 in New York City. She is the daughter of Francis Henry Taylor, then director of the Metropolitan Museum of Art. In 1962 she graduated from Radcliffe College with a major in history. She travelled to Sicily to work with social activist Danilo Dolci. In Sicily she met her future husband, Antonio Simeti, professor of agricultural economics at the University of Palermo. Together they restored the Simetis' farm near Alcamo where they produce organic olive oil and wine.

== Books ==
- “On Persephone’s Island. A Sicilian Journal“, Alfred Knopf, 1986, ISBN 978-0670809202.
- “Pomp and Sustenance: Twenty-Five Centuries of Sicilian Food“, Alfred Knopf, 1989, ISBN 978-0394568508. British edition: “Sicilian Food: Recipes from Italy's Abundant Isle“, Grub Street Cookery, 2009, ISBN 978-1902304175.
- “Bitter Almonds: Recollections and Recipes of a Sicilian Girlhood”, written with Maria Grammatico. Morrow, 1994, ISBN 978-0688124496. Italian version: “Mandorle amare”, Flaccovio Editore, 2004, ISBN 88-7804-253-6.
- “Travels With a Medieval Queen. The Journey of a Sicilian Princess to Reclaim Her Father's Crown“, Farrar Straus Giroux, 2001, ISBN 978-0374278786.
- “Fumo e arrosto: Escursioni nel paesaggio letterario e gastronomico della Sicilia”, Flaccovio Editore 2008
- “Sicilian Summer: An Adventure in Cooking with My Grandsons“, Silverwood Books, 2017, ISBN 978-1781326879.
