= Almond meal =

Ground almonds

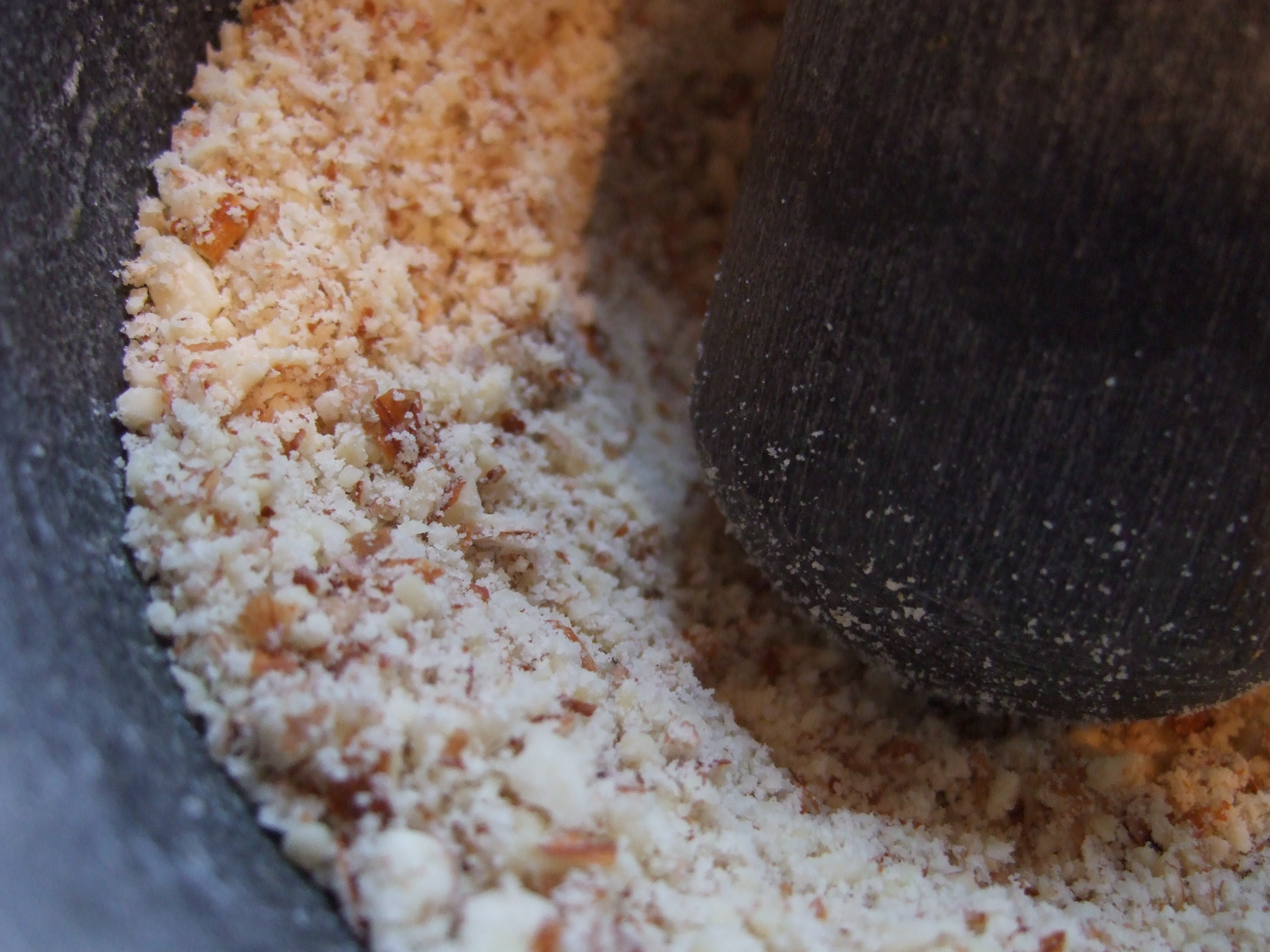
Almond meal being made by hand

Almond meal, almond flour or ground almond is made from ground sweet almonds. Almond flour is usually made with blanched almonds (no skin), whereas almond meal can be made with whole or blanched almonds. The consistency is more like corn meal than wheat flour.

It is used in pastry and confectionery – in the manufacture of almond macarons and macaroons and other sweet pastries, in cake and pie filling, such as Austrian Sachertorte – and is one of the two main ingredients of marzipan and almond paste. In France, almond meal is an important ingredient in frangipane, the filling of traditional galette des Rois cake.

Almond meal has recently become important in baking items for those on low-carbohydrate diets. It adds moistness and a rich nutty taste to baked goods. Items baked with almond meal tend to be calorie-dense.

Almonds have high levels of polyunsaturated fats. Typically, the omega 6 fatty acids in almonds are protected from oxidation by the surface skin and vitamin E. When almonds are ground, this protective skin is broken and exposed surface area increases dramatically, greatly enhancing the nut's tendency to oxidize.

== See also ==
- Almond butter
- List of almond dishes
