= Pfeffernüsse =

German cookie

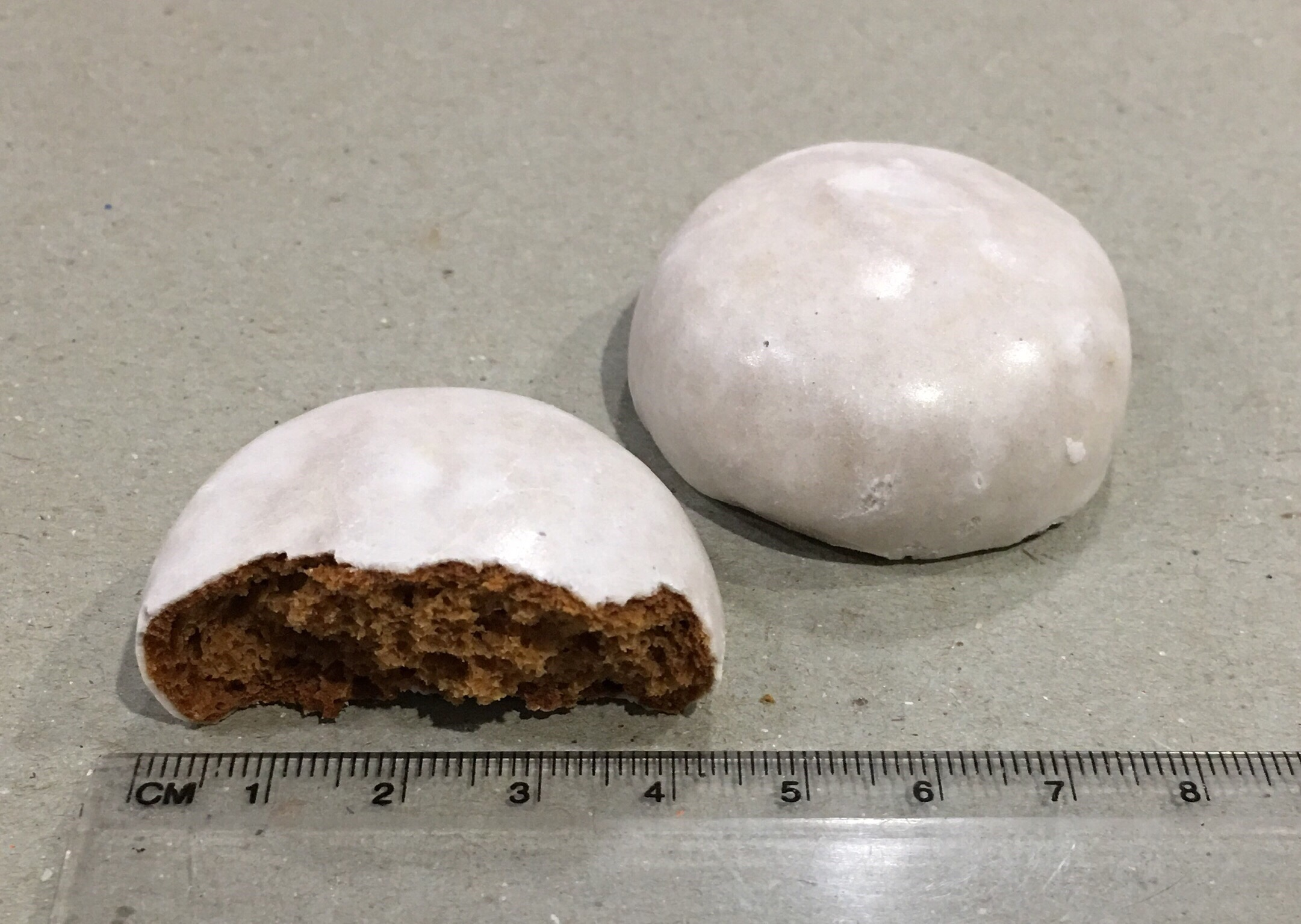
- Pfeffernüsse, by Aldi
- Alternative names: Peppernuts
- Type: Cookie
- Place of origin: Denmark, Germany, Netherlands
- Main ingredients: cardamom, nutmeg, cinnamon, cloves, ginger, black pepper, mace, anise, sugar, butter, eggs, flour

Pfeffernüsse are small spice cookies, popular as a holiday treat with Germans and ethnic Mennonites in North America. Similar cookies are made in Denmark, and The Netherlands, as well. They are called Pfeffernüsse (plural, singular is Pfeffernuss) in German, pepernoten (sing. pepernoot) in Dutch, päpanät in Plautdietsch, pfeffernusse or peppernuts in English, and pebernødder in Danish.

== History ==
Johann Fleischmann, a confectioner from Offenbach am Main, created the recipe in 1753. Goethe praised the pastries. Felix Mendelssohn went to Offenbach am Main especially to buy them. The state of Hesse has served it at state receptions.

In 1820, the Brothers Grimm warned their sister Charlotte (de) against excessive consumption: "Don't eat too much of the pepper nuts, they are said to cause a lot of heat!" At that time, nutmeg was considered an aphrodisiac, and cardamom as invigorating as caffeine.

In Germany, Pfeffernüsse are associated with Christmas. The cookie has been part of yuletide celebrations since the 1850s.

The name literally means 'peppernuts', and does not mean it contains nuts. The cookies are roughly the size of nuts and can be eaten by the handful, which may account for the name. They are named for the pinch of pepper added to the dough before baking.

== Ingredients ==
Though Pfeffernüsse cookie recipes differ, all contain aromatic spices – most commonly cardamom, nutmeg, cinnamon, cloves, ginger, black pepper, mace, and anise. Molasses, sugar, and honey are used to sweeten the cookies. Some variations are dusted with powdered sugar, though that is not a traditional ingredient. The dough is butter, shortening, or margarine, eggs, and flour.

== German varieties ==
- In northern Germany, Pfeffernüsse are a hemispherical pastry up to two centimetres in diameter and of firm consistency.
- The northern Moppen variant are larger and softer, based on a gingerbread-like dough, and have an icing glaze.
- In southern Germany, the dough is made with candied lemon peel or orange peel, orange zest, lemon zest, and often also almonds.
- In Saxony, they are about three centimetres, uncoated and angular.
- There are some recipes passed down by families of German Mennonite origin that call for peppermint extract rather than the traditional spices, making for a light minty flavor. These cookies are cooked to be soft and coated in powdered sugar. Specific origin of this variation is unknown.

== Dutch variation ==
The Netherlands gives the name kruidnoten to the small, brown, round cookies, while pepernoten concerns a chewy snack that is lighter in color and has a chunky, angular appearance. Even though they are perceivably different, some Dutch residents mistakenly call kruidnoten pepernoten and online stores list them under this category as well.

Both are holiday-exclusive snacks and available in any store that sells food around Sinterklaas time. Pepernoten are one of the earliest Sinterklaas candies, yet have become relatively rare, as most children do not prefer them.

Meanwhile, the kruidnoten recipe has become the subject of experimentation and been heavily expanded on throughout the years. Besides the regular variant and packages that include gummies and sugar candies, kruidnoten can be covered with a layer of (white/milk/pure/truffle) chocolate – which is one of the earliest and most loved variants – but also strawberry, caramel, stroopwafel, coconut, coffee, bubblegum, cake (any), etc.

== US variation ==
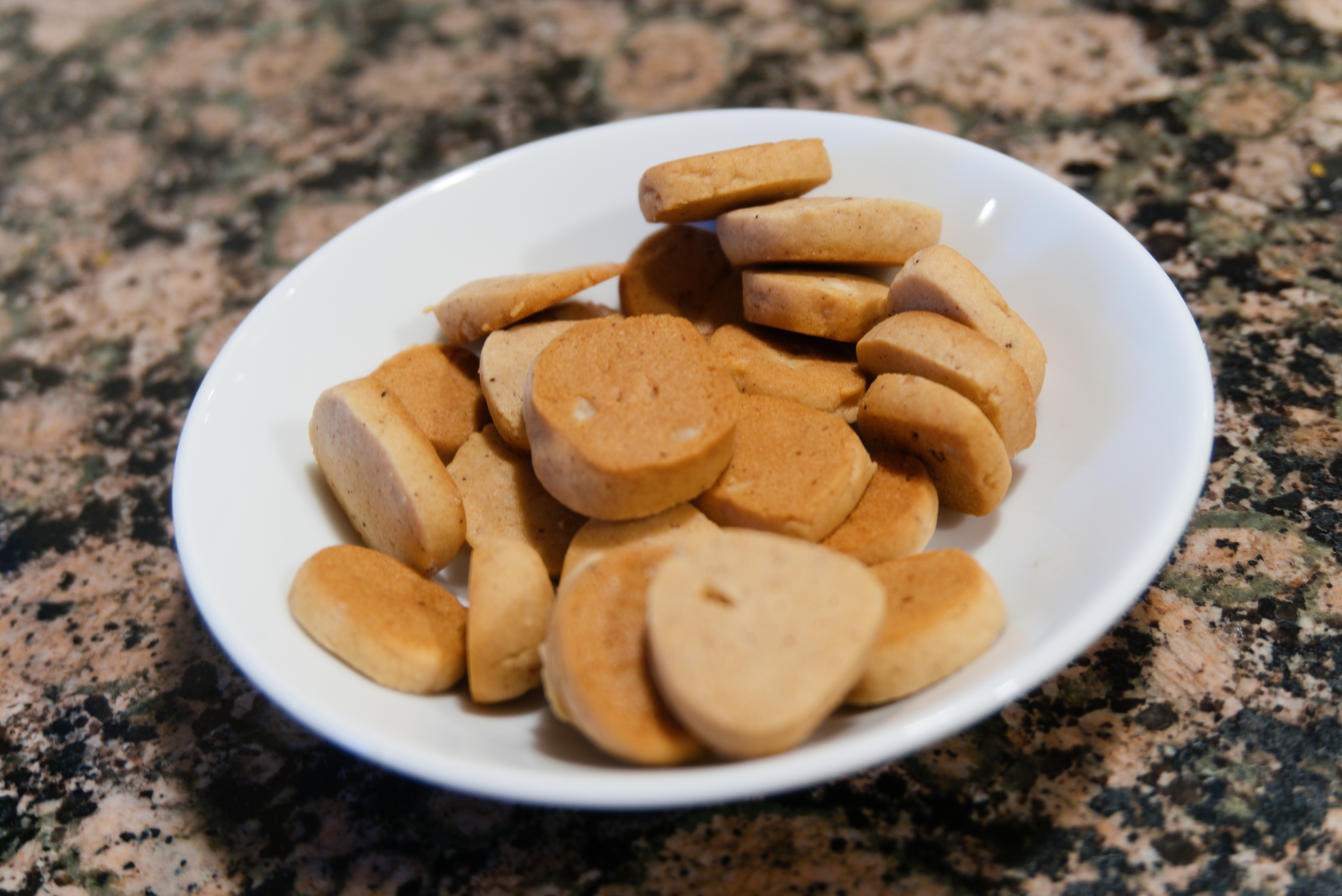
The US (Midwestern) variation of peppernuts

In the US midwest and plains states, families with German or Scandinavian roots make a treat they call peppernuts which is smaller, harder, and lacks eggs as an ingredient. As with other varieties, these peppernuts are typically holiday treats and feature anise and other spices like cinnamon, cloves, allspice, etc.

== See also ==
- Muskazine
- Lebkuchen
- Aachener Printen
- Stollen
- Speculaas
- Baumkuchen
- Springerle
- Vanillekipferl
- Bethmännchen
- de:Heidesand
- de:Zimtstern
- de:Berliner Brot
- Kruidnoten (Dutch)
- Pepernoot (Dutch)
- Macaroon (de)
