= Dutch letter =

Type of pastry

Banket
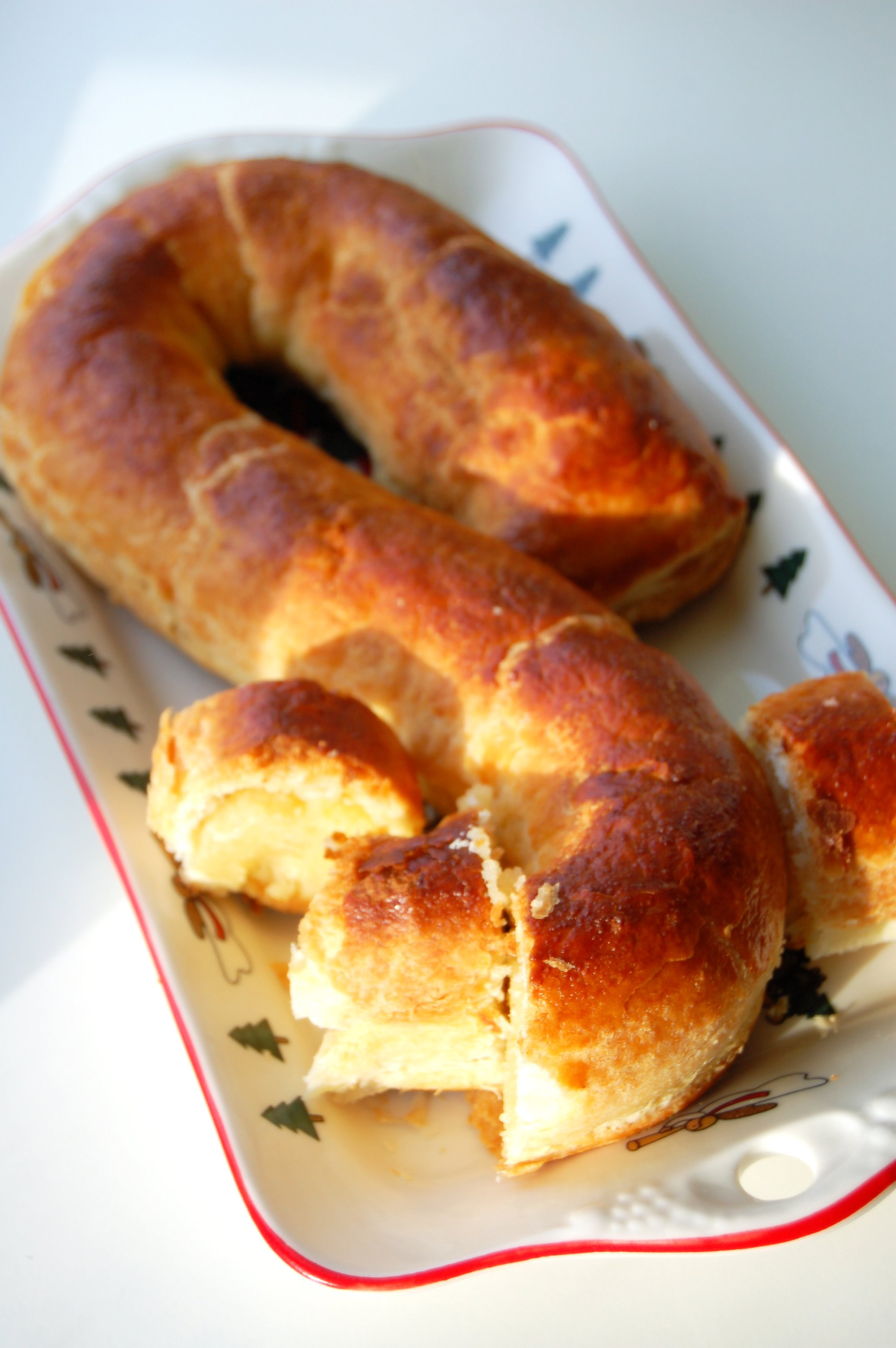
- Course: Dessert
- Place of origin: Netherlands
- Serving temperature: Hot or cold
- Main ingredients: Pastry; Almond paste

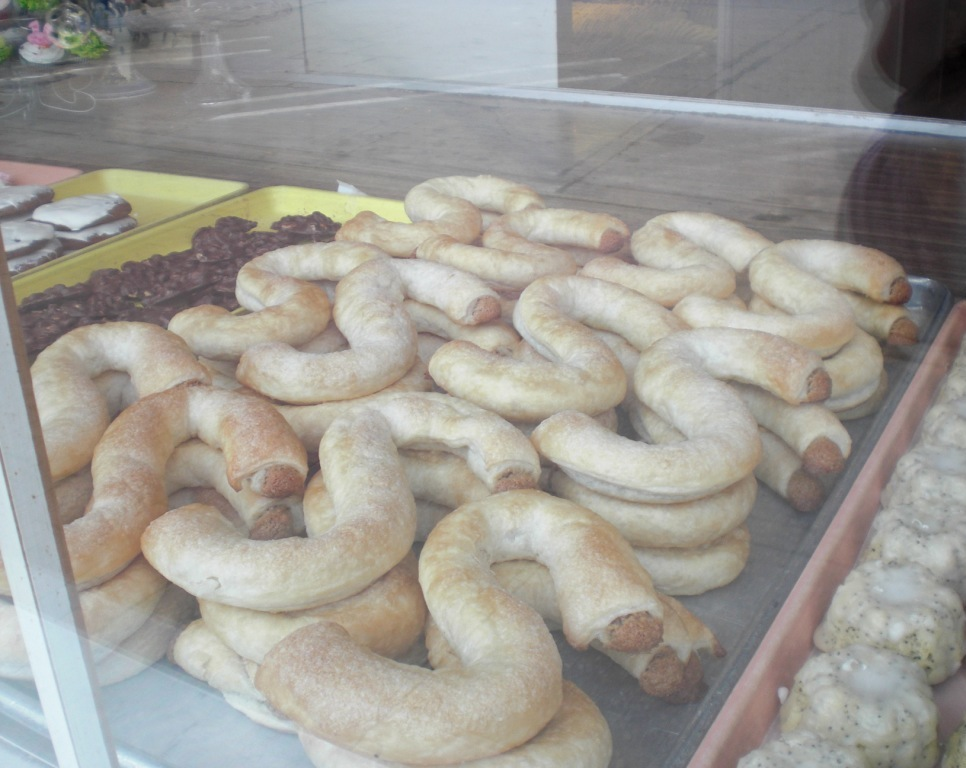
Dutch letters in Iowa

The Dutch letter (also referred to as banket letter, almond letter, butter letter, and in Dutch as banketstaaf, banketletter, boterletter, and letterbanket) is a type of pastry that is typically prepared using a mixture of flour, eggs and butter or puff pastry as its base and filled with almond paste (or persipan), dusted with sugar and shaped in an "S" or other letter shape. Marzipan, an almond paste prepared with almond meal and honey or sugar, is sometimes used as the filling. The Dutch letter has a porous or airy and flaky texture.

The pastry was originally shaped "into the initial of the family's surname." Nowadays, the most common shape of the food in the United States is as the letter "S". Dutch letters are served as a treat during December, and particularly on Sinterklaasavond on December 5 in the Netherlands, and during some festivals in the United States.

== Etymology ==
The pastry's name is a shortened version of the Dutch word banketletter. They may also be called banketstaven, boterletters, and letterbanket by Dutch people.

== History ==
=== Netherlands ===
In the Netherlands letterbanket are traditionally eaten on Sinterklaasavond on December 5, where they are shaped in the initials of family members.

=== United States ===
==== Iowa ====
Dutch letters were introduced to the United States by Dutch immigrants, and originated in Pella, Iowa, which was founded in 1845 by "Dutch religious refugees." Dutch letters are a common treat at the annual Tulip Festival in Pella, Iowa, and may be prepared by local residents and sold at markets, gas stations, and various local churches. They are sold year round at Dutch bakeries.

==== Michigan ====
Dutch letters prepared with chocolate are traditionally eaten as part of the activities during the Holland Dutch Winterfest in Holland, Michigan.

== See also ==
- Chocolate letters, are associated with the Dutch holiday of Sinterklaas.
- Dutch cuisine
- List of almond dishes
- List of pastries
- Banket (pastry)
