= Van Delft =

Dutch cookie manufacturer

Van Delft, officially named Van Delft Biscuits, is a Dutch producer of cookies and Sinterklaas products. it produces 3 billion kruidnoten/year and is the largest kruidnoten producer in the world. Van Delft company was founded by Jan van Delft in Koog aan de Zaan. In the 1970's it was market leader in Ontbijtkoek. In 2020 Van Delft Biscuits opened a new factory in Harderwijk.

== Brands ==
- De Pepernotenfabriek
- Yoghurt FruitBars
- Cafe Noir
- Jungle Koeken
- Likkoeken
- Bruintjes
- Breakfast Biscuit Milk & Cereals
