= Banket (pastry) =

Almond filled pastry

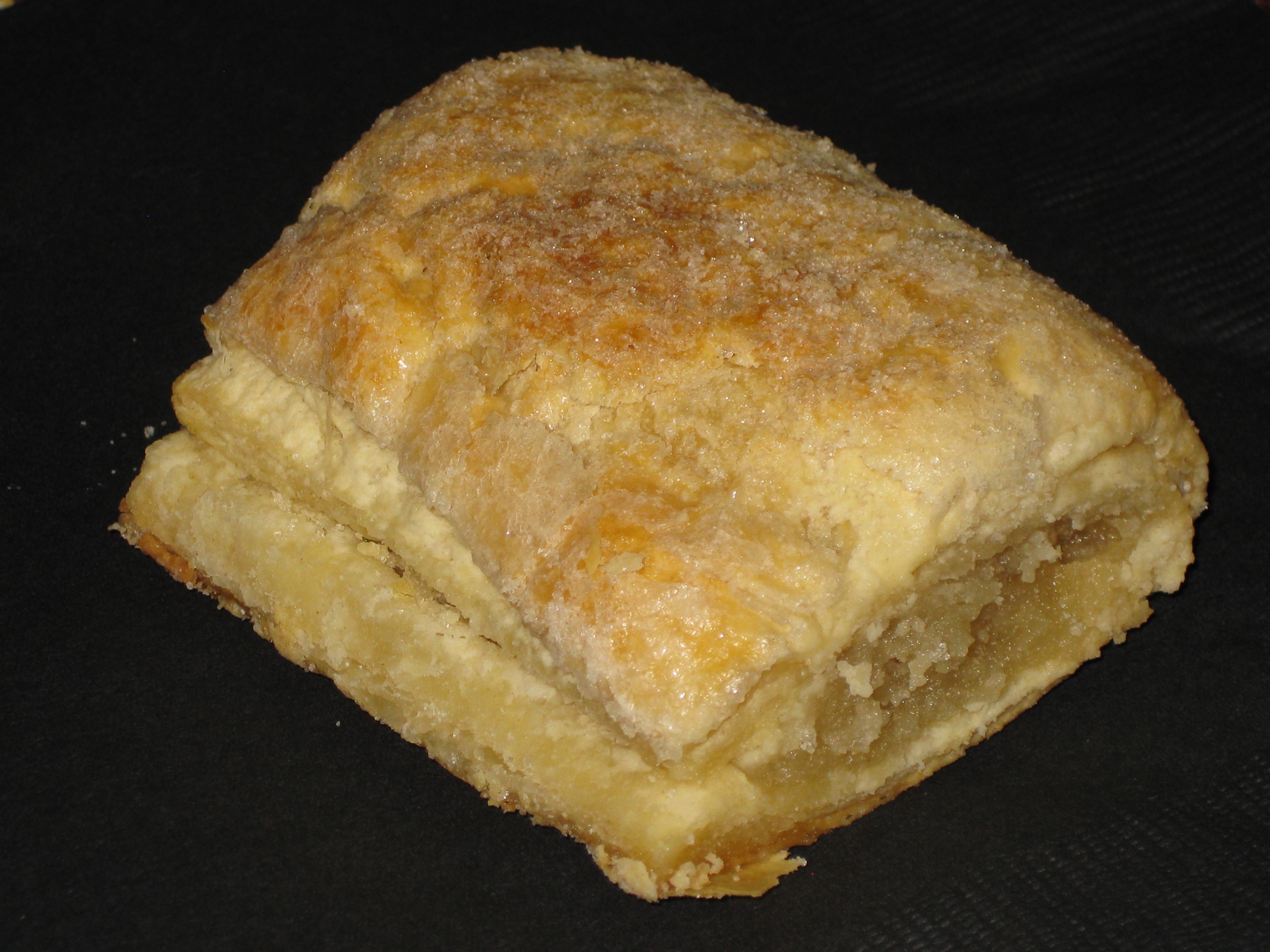
- Course: Dessert
- Place of origin: Netherlands
- Serving temperature: Hot or cold
- Main ingredients: Pastry; Almond paste
- Variations: Dutch letters

Banket (bahn-KET) is a type of sweet pastry filled with almond paste, which originated in the Netherlands. It is made in several forms, each of which goes by various names. One variety consists of long bars or loaves which are sliced into individual servings – also referred to in English as almond rolls or almond patties, and in Dutch as banketstaven. Another variety are rolled logs shaped into letters – also referred to in English as Dutch letters, banket letters, almond letters, or butter letters; and in Dutch as banketletter or boterletter. It is sometimes made as individual banket or almond patties.

Banket is made by rolling pastry dough around an almond paste filling, then baking it. The pastry has a porous, airy, and flaky texture, with a dense granular filling.

In the Netherlands and in ethnic Dutch communities in the Midwestern United States, it is most popular during Christmas season. It is also popular during Dutch festivals in the United States.

== Ingredients and preparation ==
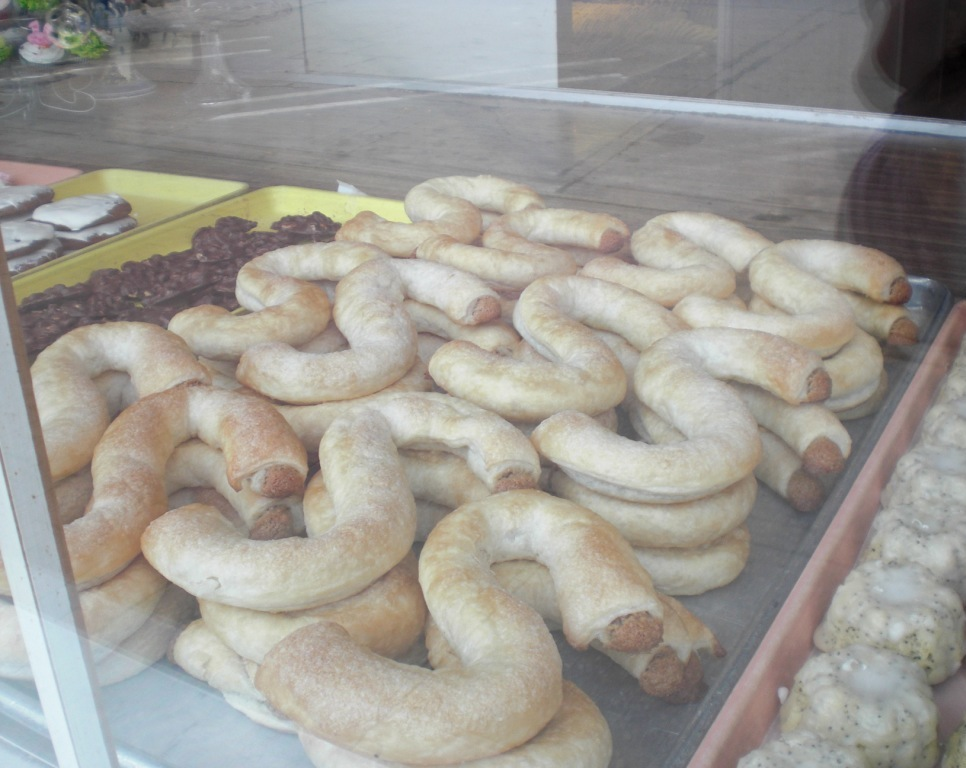
Dutch letters in Iowa

Banket is typically prepared using a mixture of flour, eggs, and butter, or puff pastry as its base, then filled with almond paste, and dusted with sugar. Marzipan, an almond paste prepared with almond meal and honey or sugar, is sometimes used as the filling. Although usually prepared and sold fresh, it can also be packaged for retail sale.

In one popular form, banket is rolled or folded into a log a foot or two long, baked, then cut into short lengths for serving, hot or cold. It can also be frozen for serving later. It is sometimes prepared as a cookie. The "Dutch letter" is rolled and shaped into a letter. Traditionally, the pastry was shaped into the initial of the family's surname, but today is most commonly shaped as the letter S.

== History ==
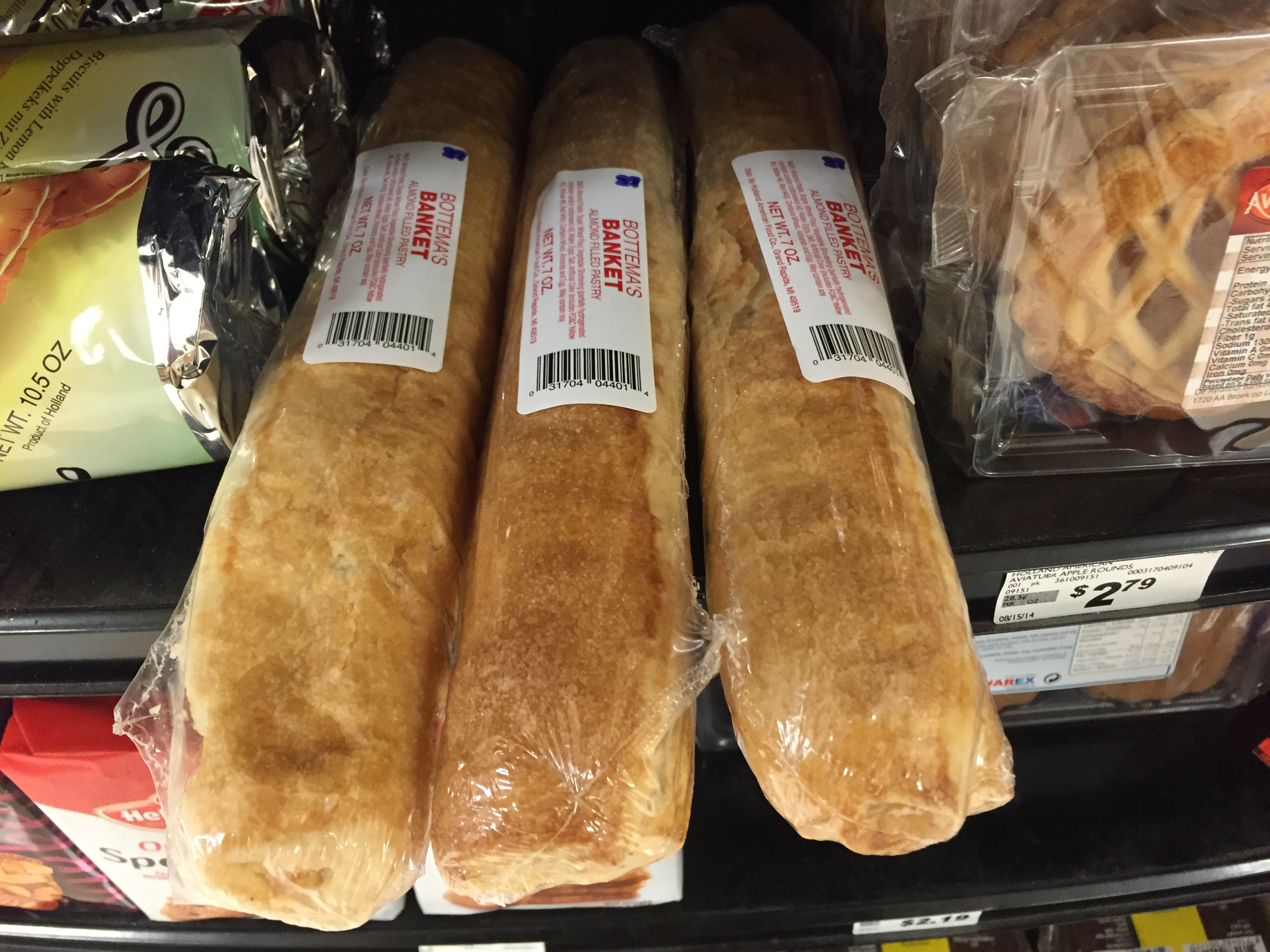
Banket packaged for retail sale in Michigan

=== Netherlands ===
In the Netherlands banketletter are traditionally eaten on Sinterklaasavond on December 5.

=== United States ===
Banket was introduced in the United States by Dutch immigrants, in Pella, Iowa, Orange City, Iowa, and Holland, Michigan, each founded in the 1800s by "Dutch religious refugees". Dutch letters are a common treat at the annual Tulip Festival in Pella, and may be prepared by local residents and sold at local churches.

== See also ==
- Chocolate letter
- Dutch cuisine
- List of cookies
- List of pastries
