= Bear claw =

Pastry with almond paste filling

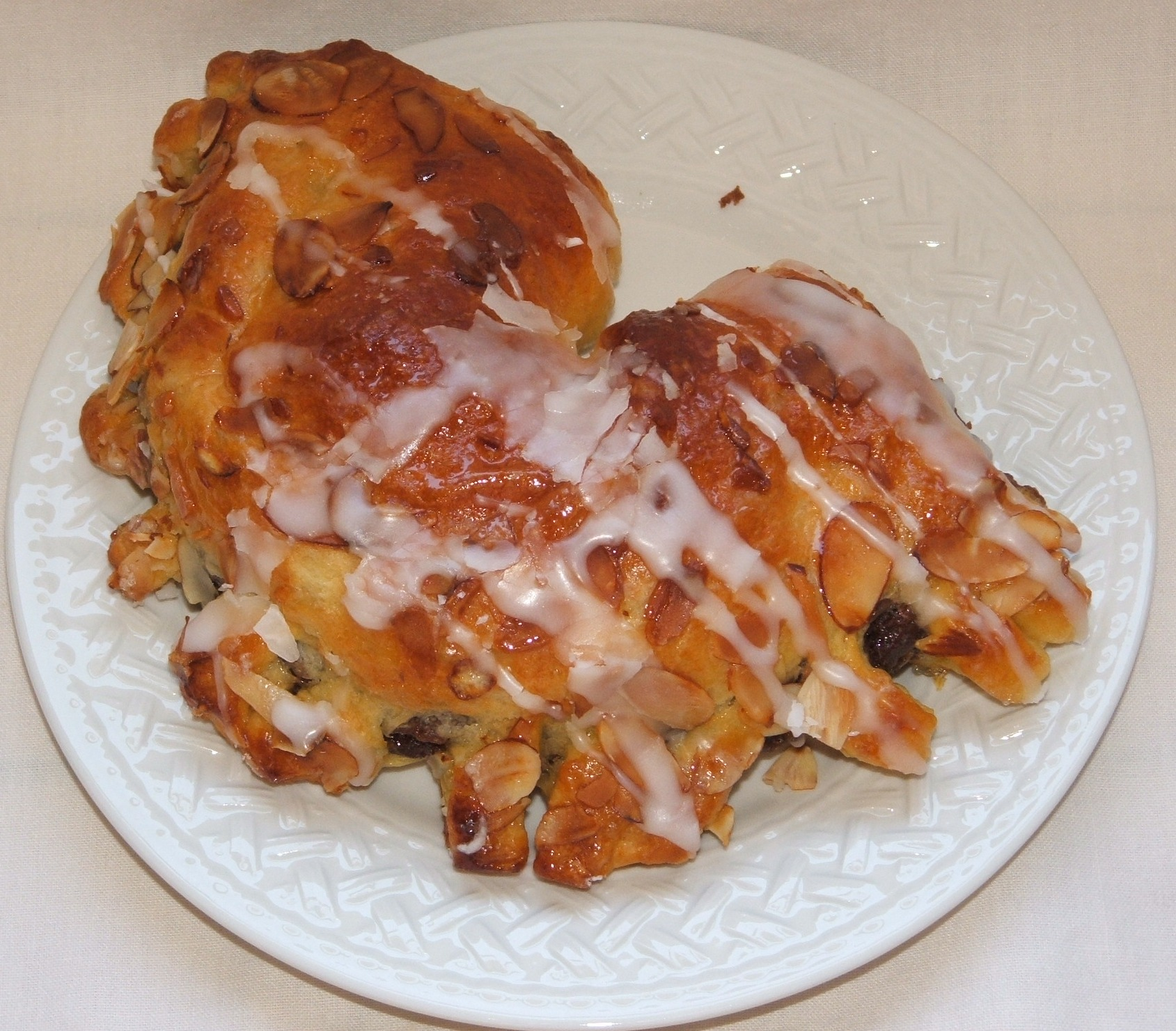
- Type: Pastry, doughnut or fritter
- Place of origin: United States
- Main ingredients: Dough, almond paste
- Ingredients generally used: Raisins

A bear claw is a sweet pastry originating in the United States during the mid-1910s. The name bear claw as used for a pastry is first attested in a 1914 newspaper ad for the Geibel German Bakery in Sacramento, California.

In Denmark, a bear claw is referred to as a kam and in Germany as Kamm. France also has an alternate version of that pastry: patte d'ours (meaning bear paw), created in 1982 in the Alps.

== Origin and usage of term ==
The name bear claw as used for a pastry is first attested on March 13, 1914, in a newspaper ad for the Geibel German Bakery in Sacramento, California. According to the Sacramento Bee, no "prior reference to bear claws has been made public". Sacramento historian William Burg "cautioned against definitively crowning Sacramento as ground zero for bear claws". By the next year, bear claws were on the breakfast menu at German-owned Hamburger's Los Angeles, which was then the largest department store west of Chicago.

The phrase is more common in Western American English, and is included in the U.S. Regional Dialect Survey Results, Question #87, "Do you use the term 'bear claw' for a kind of pastry?"

== Ingredients and shape ==
Most Danishes include the same basic ingredients such as eggs, yeast, flour, milk, sugar, and butter. The bear claw is also made with "sweet dough" which is "bread dough with more shortening than usual". One of the differences between most Danishes, besides taste, is seen in their shape. A bear claw is usually filled with almond paste, and sometimes raisins, and often shaped in a semicircle with slices along the curved edge, or rectangular with partial slices along one side. As the dough rises, the sections separate, evoking the shape of a bear's toes, hence the name. A bear claw may also be a yeast doughnut in a shape similar to that of the pastry.

== Production ==
A bear claw can be made by hand or by machine. Bear claw can be hand-made by using a bear claw cutter that was invented in 1950 by James Fennell. A 1948 patent describes the process of assembling the bear claw as rolling out the dough, layering filling onto it, folding the dough over, cutting small incisions to create the claw-like look, and finally cutting the dough into separate pastries. The pastry can be curved into a half-circle at this point, which causes the "toes" to separate.

== See also ==
- Banket, an almond-stuffed pastry from the Netherlands
- List of almond dishes
- List of pastries
- List of regional dishes of the United States
