= Pepernoot =

Dutch confectionery

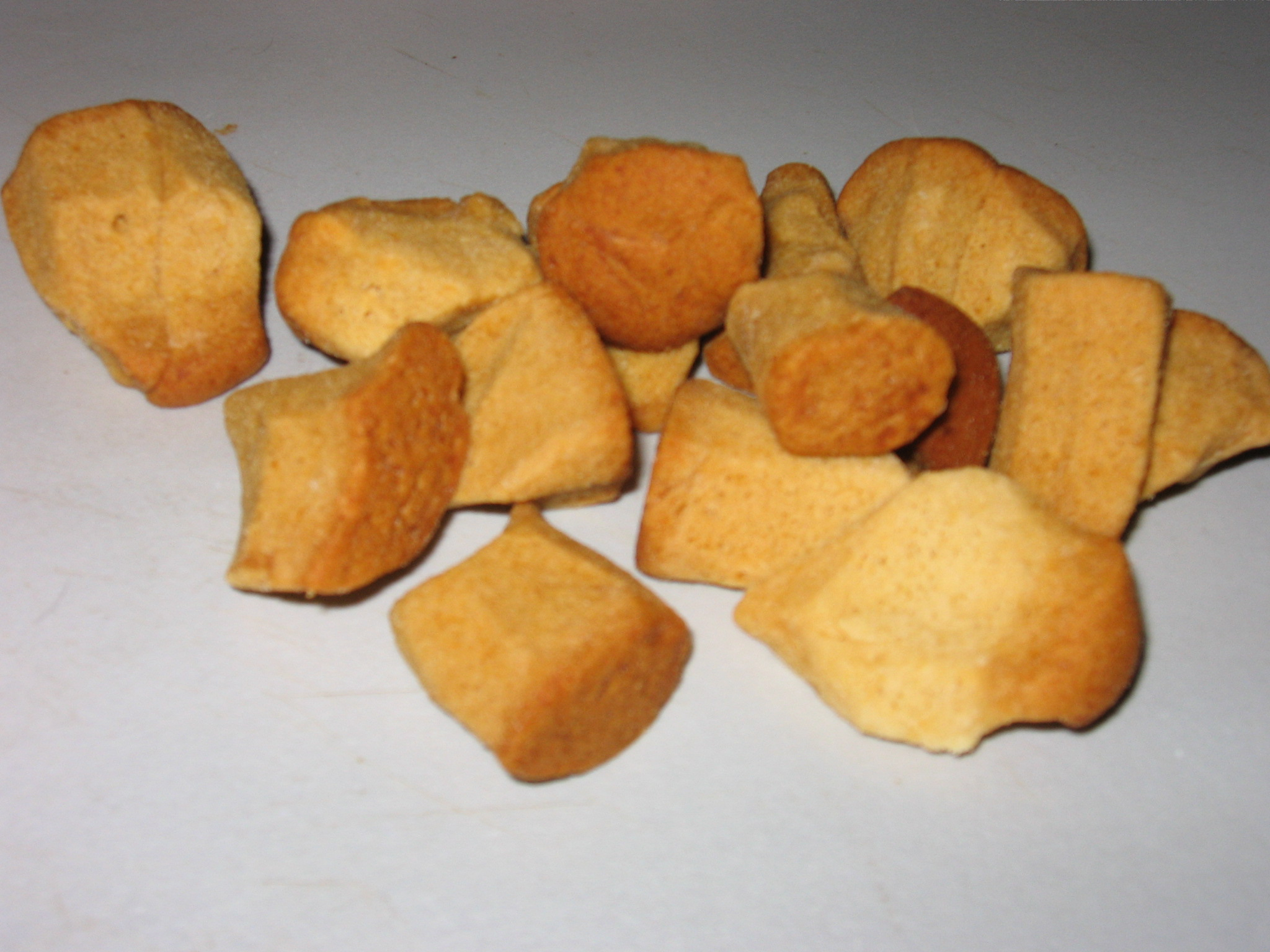
- Course: Treat
- Place of origin: Netherlands
- Main ingredients: Flour; Sugar; Aniseed; Cinnamon; Cloves

A pepernoot (Dutch pronunciation: [ˈpeːpərˌnoːt]; plural: pepernoten [ˈpeːpərˌnoːtə(n)]; literally, "pepper nuts") is a Dutch cookie-like confectionery, traditionally associated with the early December Sinterklaas holiday in the Netherlands and Belgium. The ingredients have some similarities with German Pfeffernüsse.

They are light brown, square shaped, and made from the same ingredients as taai-taai: rye flour, sugar and anise, and sometimes also cinnamon, and clove. They are fairly chewy, though they harden gradually when exposed to the air.

A particularly distinct custom associated with pepernoten is throwing them in handfuls through the room so children can look for them. Originally this is an ancient fertility symbol not unlike throwing rice at a marriage like a farmer sowing seeds. In ancient times, parents of newborns would place one or two carrots underneath the infant's pillow. They believed Sinterklaas would then come and bless the child by showering the infant with "pepernoten".

== See also ==
- Kruidnoten are often confused with pepernoten.
- Pfeffernüsse
