= Sint =

- Theatrical release poster
- Directed by: Dick Maas
- Written by: Dick Maas
- Produced by: Tom de Mol; Dick Maas
- Starring: Huub Stapel; Egbert-Jan Weeber; Caro Lenssen; Bert Luppes; Escha Tanihatu
- Cinematography: Guido van Gennep
- Edited by: Bert Rijkelijkhuizen
- Music by: Dick Maas
- Production companies: Tom de Mol Productions; Parachute Pictures; RTL Entertainment
- Distributed by: A-Film Distribution
- Release dates: 31 October 2010 (Razor Reel Fantastic Film Festival); 11 November 2010 (Netherlands)
- Running time: 85 minutes
- Country: Netherlands
- Language: Dutch
- Budget: €4.4 million
- Box office: $3.8 million

Sint (released on DVD as Saint in Europe and Saint Nick in the United States) is a 2010 Dutch dark comedy horror film about Sinterklaas, the character on which the Anglo-Saxon Santa Claus is based. The film was directed by Dick Maas and marked his return to the horror genre, in which he gained acclaim with his debut The Lift (1983) and Amsterdamned (1988). The story distorts the popular traditions of Sinterklaas and portrays him as a ghost who murders large numbers of people when his annual celebration night coincides with a full moon.

== Plot ==
On December 5, 1492, members of a gang led by former bishop Niklas are killed by villagers who refuse to put up with the gang's looting and killing any longer. In years in which the gang's death date coincides with a full moon, they return as murderous ghosts.

The public is unaware of this and annually celebrates the Sinterklaas tradition on December 5, with adults not believing that Sinterklaas exists, but making little children believe that he does exist as a kind man who gives presents. The black Petes are not blackened by soot from the chimneys they enter to deliver presents, but as a result of the fire in which they were killed. Niklas' crosier (bishops’ staff) is a weapon; it has sharp edges and can be used as a sword or spear. On December 5, Sinterklaas and his Petes do not stand out, as many people dress like them for the celebration.

Goert, the oldest child of a family living in the farmlands, celebrates Sinterklaas with his little brother and sisters in 1968. As the Saint arrives to his house, he hears rumbling and growling noises. After comforting the pigs in the nearby barn, he sees Niklas on horseback on the roof of his house, and his helpers enter his house. He survives that night, but loses both his parents and all his siblings. 42 years later, the orphan is a police detective working in Amsterdam; as pakjesavond approaches, he is very concerned and recommends prohibiting all Sinterklaas activities and increasing surveillance as December 5, 2010 coincides with a full moon, but he is not taken seriously and sent on leave.

Frank, a high school student from the wealthy South Amsterdam neighbourhood, is noted that this Saint Nicholas' Day falls on a full moon, as he prepares to play Sinterklaas at a university student housing complex near the city centre. While driving to the location, a violent gang attacks his car, killing his two friends who play the Petes. Frank successfully defeats the gang on his own, but gets arrested for killing his friends, as well as his ex-girlfriend who ended her relationship with him earlier that day, who was found dead at the fireplace of her house. As he tells his story, no one at the police bureau believes him. As he is brought to prison, the police officers who drive the police car see Niklas on horseback and try to stop him by shooting him. Niklas' horse then falls on top of the police car from the rooftops. The officers are killed, and Frank escapes, as he discovers that Niklas and his horse are back on their feet despite being riddled by bullets. Frank's life is saved by a man who chases the two away with a flamethrower.

That man is revealed to be Goert, who brought Frank to his boat. He tells him that he spent much of his life doing research to Saint Nicholas. In 1968, roughly 300 people around the country were killed on 5 December, and according to him, it is no coincidence, as he assumes that Niklas and his gang invaded those people's houses like they did to his. He says that the authorities downplay the incidents, and they, as well as the Roman Catholic Church, keep the possible involvement of Niklas a secret. Knowing that the evil Saint arrives by sailing ship in the Old Harbour, and that he and his helpers are not immune against fire, he plans a kamikaze attack on Niklas' ship with his boat, on which he loaded barrels of explosives. A nearby police boat intercepts them after seeing that they carry explosives, and sends a special operations team to the harbour. After a brief interrogation, they confirm their finding of a sailing ship with an infrared camera. Niklas' gang attacks the men, killing Goert and most special officers. Frank then sends Goert's boat to the ship using fireworks, so he doesn't have to kill himself. The boat successfully targets the ship, and police confirm everything Frank and Goert have told about Niklas.

News reports reveal that such incidents have happened throughout the country that day. Despite this, Frank is told not to talk about Niklas and his murderous gang and how they might have caused those incidents, as they undermine the notion that Saint Nicholas is a good man that gives people, in particular children, happiness and something to look forward to, as well as a reason to behave well towards their peers and their family, for they are rewarded by the Saint for good manners. Frank tells his new girlfriend that he will tell the real story to her one day. Otherwise, she and everyone else will know after the next full moon Saint Nicholas' Day 23 years later.

== Cast ==
- Huub Stapel as St. Niklas, an evil bishop who was killed 475 years ago and murders every 32 years on average on 5 December.
- Egbert-Jan Weeber as Frank, a teenage boy who is falsely accused of being the 5 December killer.
- Madelief Blanken as Natasha, a good friend of Frank.
- Caro Lenssen as Lisa, Frank's new girlfriend who believes in the myth of the evil bishop.
- Escha Tanihatu as Sophie, Lisa's best friend and Frank's ex-girlfriend.
- Bert Luppes as Goert, a suspended police officer who survived Sint's murderous attack 40 years earlier and does not observe the Sinterklaas holiday anymore.
  - Niels van den Berg as young Goert
- Cynthia Abma as Lisa's mother
- Kees Boot as a police officer
- Joey van der Valden as Hanco, a good friend of Frank
- Jim Deddes as Sander, another friend of Frank

== Release ==
Sint had a substantial international release with rights being sold to over 30 countries. It was released on DVD with English subtitles in the United Kingdom by Metrodome Distribution in 2011.

== Reception ==
Sint received negative reviews upon its release, with critics stating that the film's premise showed promise, but never reached its full potential.

Chris Cabin of Slant Magazine rated the film one out of four stars, calling it "predictably plotted and visually monotonous", criticizing the film's "unexceptional" kills and, lack of tension and/or scares. James Dennis from Screen Anarchy gave the film a mixed review, writing, "With strong effects work, it's a breezy, fun ride while it lasts, but it's not something that will linger in the mind long. And that's a bit of a shame given the potential of Saint's creepy premise."

== Controversy ==
Although children were not permitted to see the film, parental concern arose over the film's poster, seen in the streets and in the lobbies of movie theaters. It shows Sinterklaas with a mutilated face and a malevolent look. Some people were concerned that this could be confusing and frightening for little children who still believe in Sinterklaas. A legal complaint was filed in October 2010, requesting the removal of all posters. In the subsequent court case, director Dick Maas argued that if parents could make their children believe that Sinterklaas existed they could also inform their children that the man on the poster was not the real Sinterklaas. The court ruled in favor of Maas, noting that the mutilated face was not visible enough on the poster, and rejected the complaint.
