= Kruidnoten =

Dutch sweets

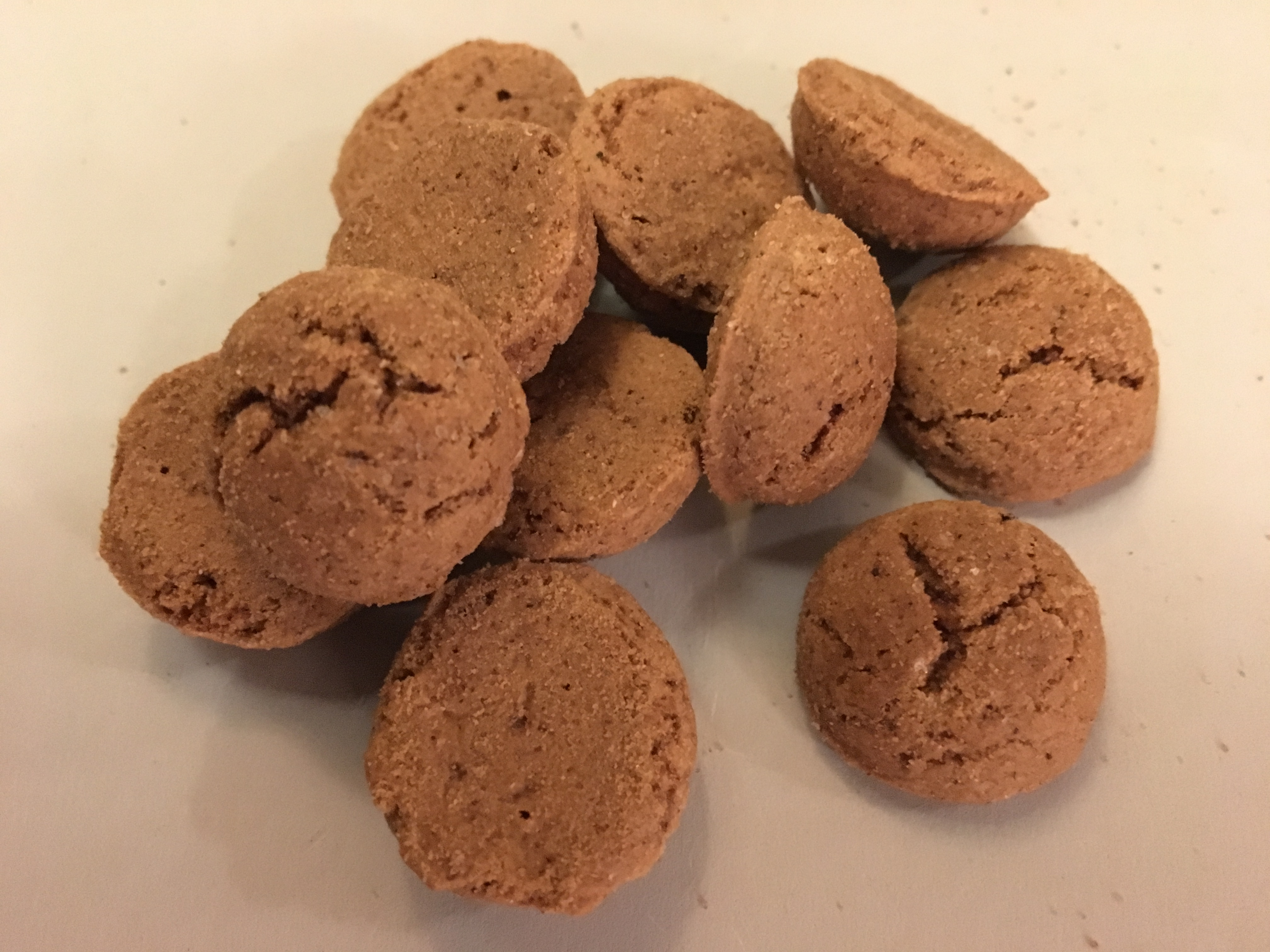
- kruidnoten
- Alternative names: pepernoten
- Type: Biscuit
- Place of origin: Netherlands
- Main ingredients: Flour; Brown sugar; Butter; Pepper; Cinnamon; Ginger; Cloves; Cardamom; Nutmeg
- Variations: many (see article)
- Food energy (per serving): 75 or more

Kruidnoten (Dutch pronunciation: [ˈkrœytnoːtə(n)]) are hard cookie-like confectioneries made of speculaas, roughly the size of a coin and shaped as a flattened hemisphere. They are traditionally associated with Sinterklaas festivities and commonly eaten in Belgium and the Netherlands.

== Traditions ==
=== The Netherlands ===
When children come to witness Sinterklaas' arrival to the country, it is normal to receive a handful of kruidnoten from one of his helpers called Piet. At home, during Sinterklaas eve, kruidnoten and other candies are thrown around. Children consider it a form of entertainment to go around and collect the dropped candies. In earlier days it was habit to throw around kruidnoten on the pavement and at schools during visits of Sinterklaas, too. At a certain moment, maybe because of hygiene concerns, this became less common. At school, visiting Pieten now tend to lay down a pile or small bag on the student's desk or directly in the child's hand. Although some guess this throwing around has a deeper meaning, comparable to the throwing of rice at weddings it is most likely a symbol of Sinterklaas' generosity. Some schools and supermarkets organize make-them-yourself sessions. Children are given pre-made dough and are tasked to shape them into kruidnoten.

=== Belgium ===
Kruidnoten were not consumed by the Flemish for a long time and no traditions exist, but around the late 2010s, interest in them grew. Instead of kruidnoten, Piet throws letter-shaped biscuits that come with different names depending on the region, like "karolientjes", "mokskes", "pieknieken", or "nicnacjes".

== Variations ==
In the Netherlands, kruidnoten are one of the most popular and recognizable candies during the Sinterklaas period. During the 21st century the recipe has become the subject of experimentation. Pop-up shops, fully devoted to selling the many variants that have been produced over the years, have become a yearly sight in many cities. The common grocery and candy store has a selection to choose from as well. Besides the regular variant and packages that include gummies and sugar candies kruidnoten can be covered with a layer of (white/milk/pure/truffle) chocolate. Some large retailers such as Albert Heijn and Jamin and producers such as Van Delft provide many types with other flavors. In 2021 they offered:

- Caramel (usually with sea salt)
- Powdered sugar (additional ingredient to other variants)
- Coconut
- Butterscotch
- Tiramisu
- Crème brûlée
- Stracciatella
- Yogurt
- Stroopwafel
- Tompouce
- Macaroon
- Speculoos (Flemish variant of speculaas; not spicy, softer texture)
- Liquorice
- Salmiak
- Sour rolls (Fruit Roll-Up covered with sour sugar)
- Ginger
- Cinnamon
- Hazelnut
- Pistachio
- Anise
- Peanut butter
- Toffee
- Honey
- Cheese
- Bubblegum
- Cola
- "Rainbow/Unicorn" (sugar coated, with the main appeal being the colorful look of the kruidnoten; a product solely targeted at small children)
- Alcohol:
  - Licor 43
  - Prosecco
  - Limoncello
  - Gin and tonic
- Fruit:
  - Strawberry
  - Blueberry
  - Raspberry
  - Cranberry
  - Orange
  - Melon
  - Banana
  - Passion fruit
  - Lemon
  - Lime
- Coffee:
  - Cappuccino
  - Irish coffee
  - Caffè macchiato
- Cake/pie:
  - Cheesecake
  - Carrot cake
  - Apple pie
  - Red velvet
  - Pumpkin spice

== Gallery ==
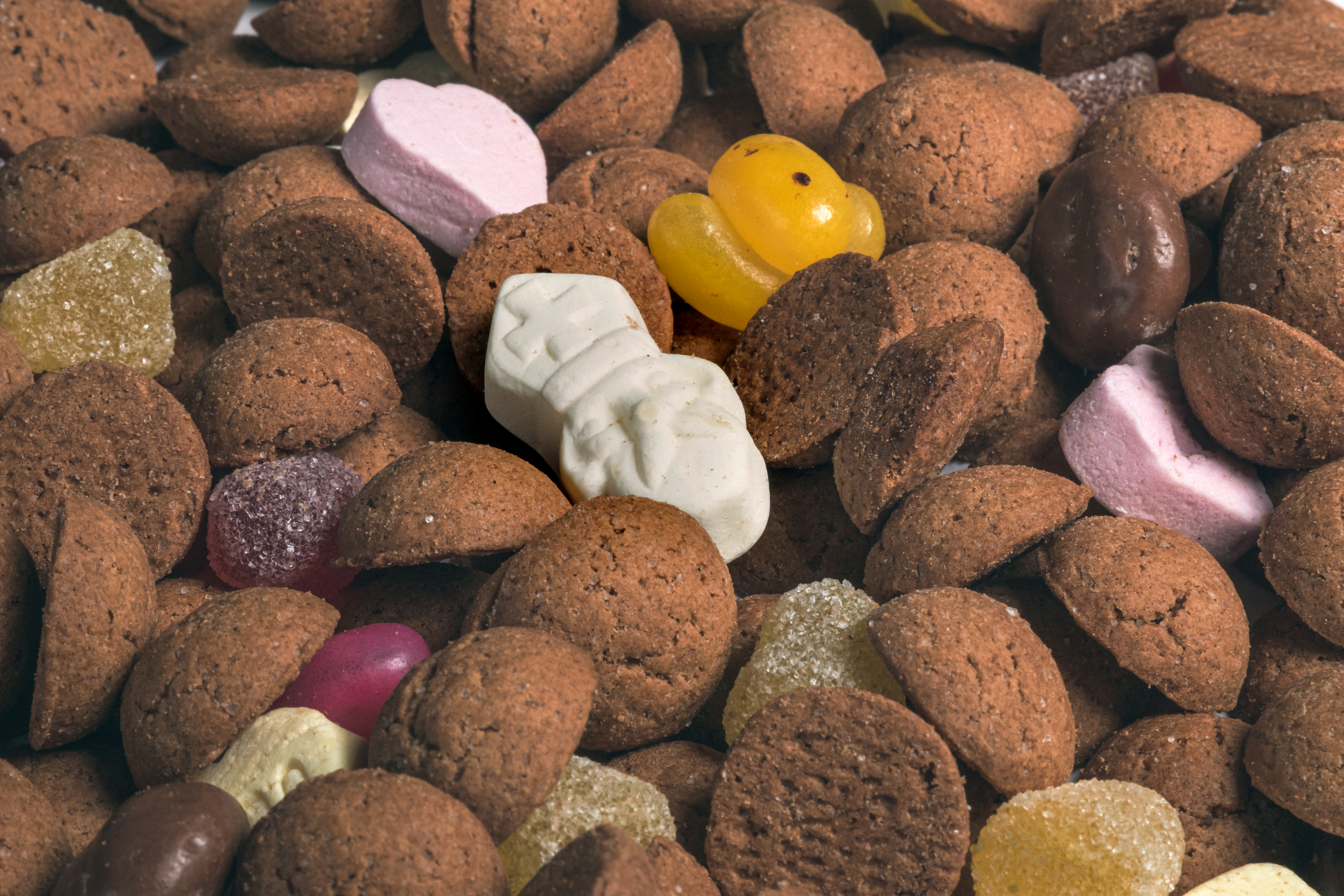
Kruidnoten with candies, called "strooigoed"

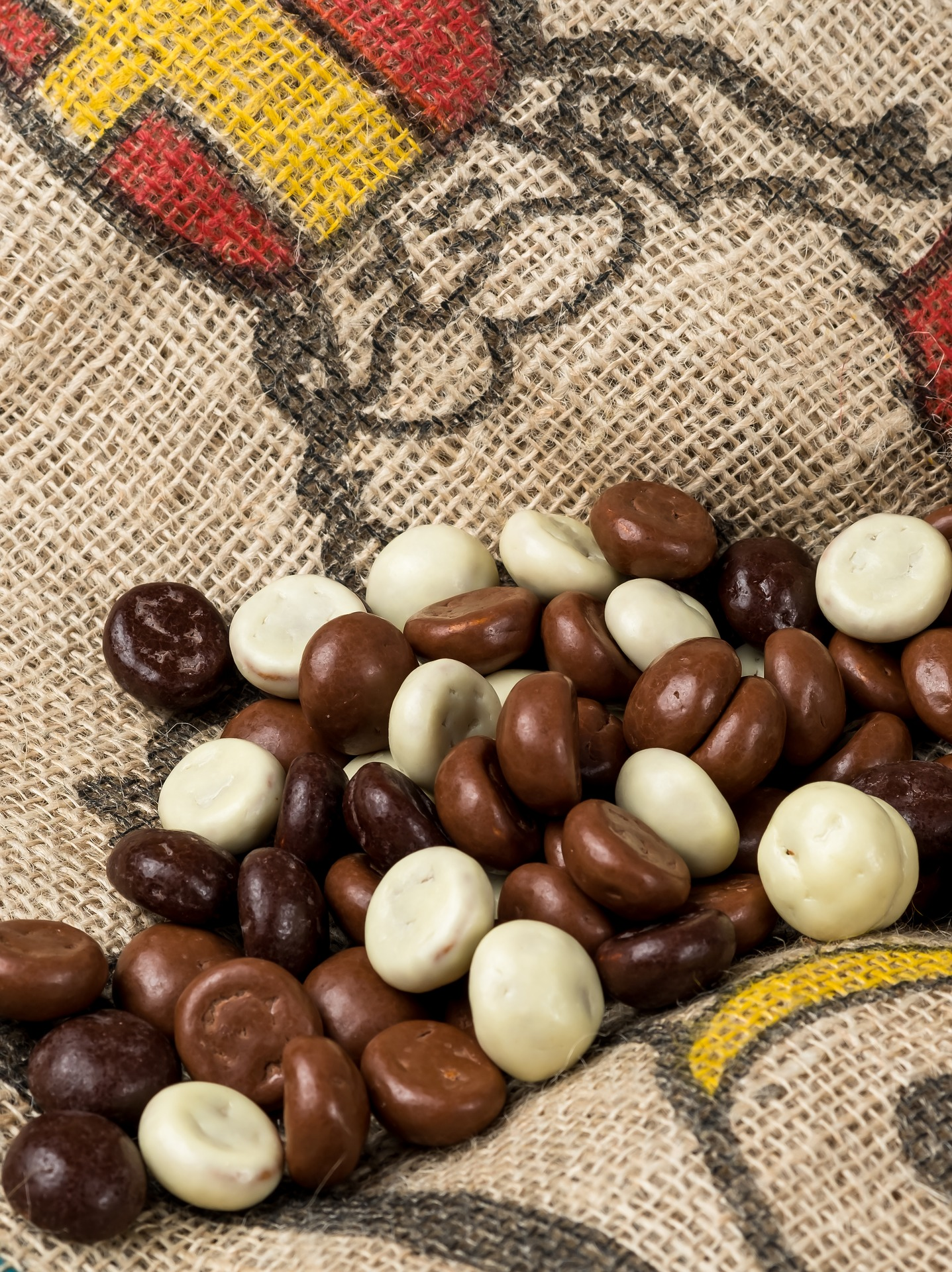
Kruidnoten with a layer of chocolate, called "chocoladekruidnoten"

== Trivia ==
- Some years food producers, like Bolletje or consumer organisations hold contests or ask people to introduce and vote for a new flavor.
- Though perceivably different; some Dutch residents mistakenly call kruidnoten "pepernoten" and stores list them under this category as well.
