= Chocolate letter =

Letter of the alphabet made of chocolate

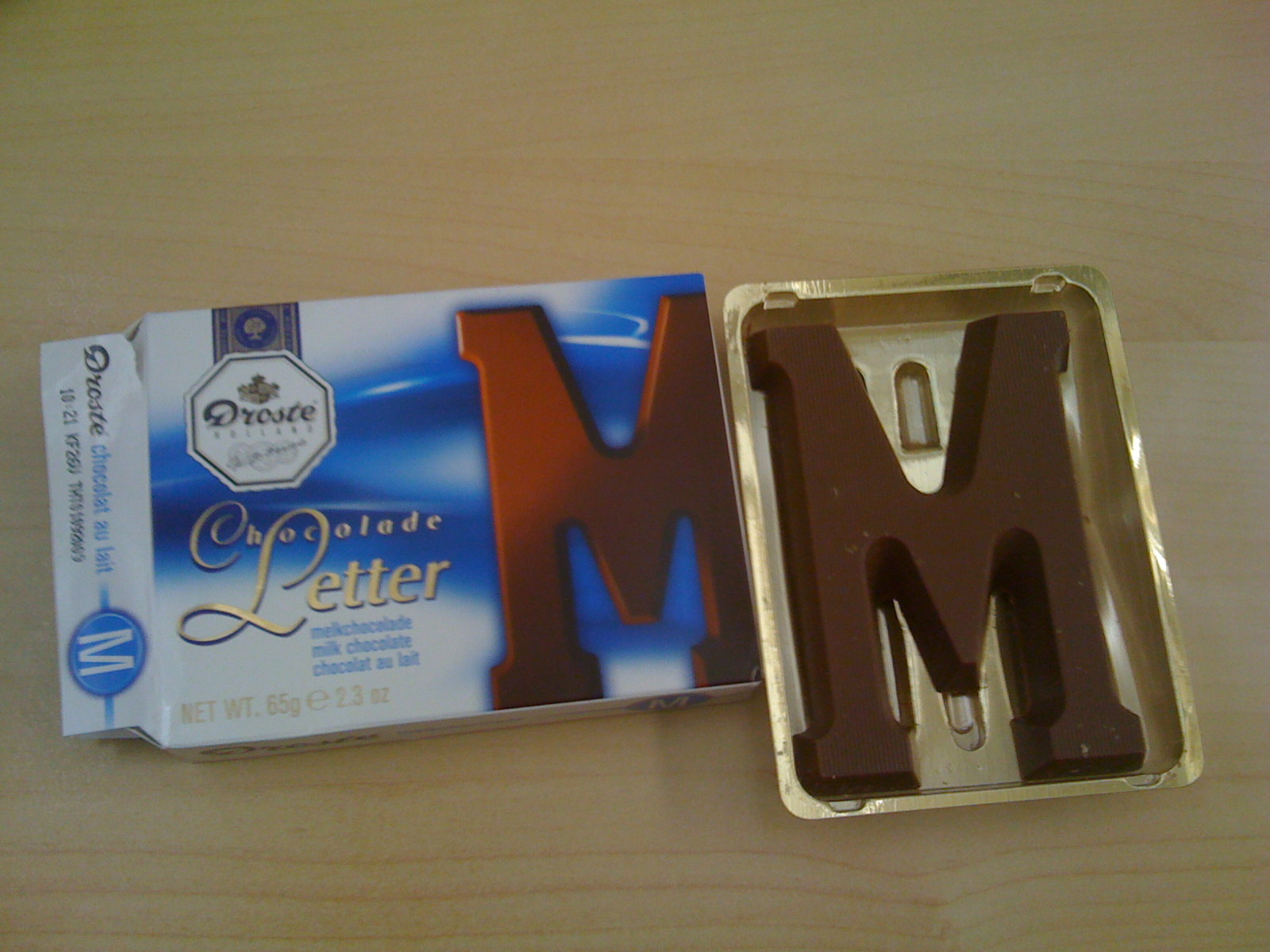
- Chocolate letter "M"
- Alternative names: kaketoe
- Type: Chocolate
- Place of origin: Netherlands
- Main ingredients: Chocolate

Chocolate letters (Dutch: chocoladeletter [ɕoːkoːˈlaːdəˌlɛtər]) are a form of candy associated with the Dutch holiday of Sinterklaas (Saint Nicholas). Celebrants of the Sinterklaas celebration are traditionally given their initials made out of chocolate, either on Sinterklaas Eve, which is 5 December each year, or during the morning on Sinterklaas Day, which is 6 December. Various sizes, types and flavours are available.

In order to use the same amount of chocolate for each letter, the manufacturer varies the thickness of the letter. This way, one letter is not favoured over another, for example, with wide letters such as the W or the M getting more chocolate than narrow letters such as I or the J. Instead, the wide letters are made with a thinner layer of chocolate, and the narrow letters get a thicker layer of chocolate.

An often used typeface is Egyptienne.
