= Sinterklaas =

Legendary figure based on Saint Nicholas

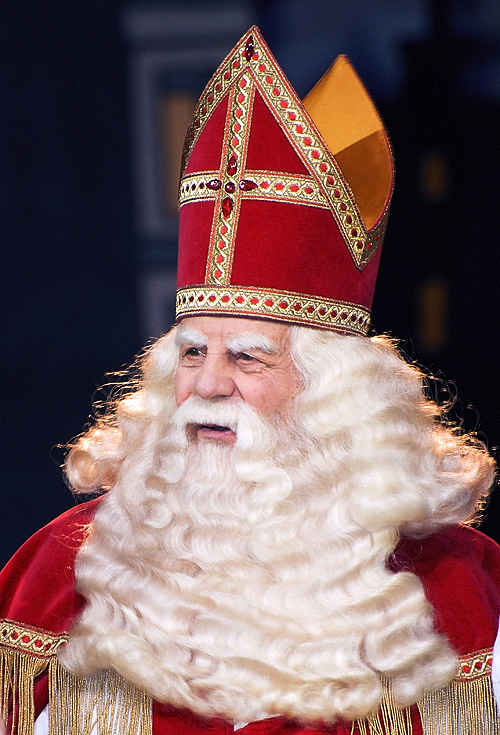
- Sinterklaas played by Bram van der Vlugt
- Associates: Zwarte Piet
- Attire: Long red cape or chasuble over a traditional white bishop's alb and a sometimes-red stole, a red mitre and ruby ring, and a gold-coloured crosier
- Aliases: Sint-Nicolaas; De Sint; De Goede Sint; De Goedheiligman; Sinterklaas Kapoentje
- Gender: Man
- Occupation: Delivering gifts to children on St Nicholas' Eve
- Home: Spain

Sinterklaas (Dutch: [ˌsɪntərˈklaːs]) or Sint-Nicolaas (Dutch: [sɪnt ˈnikoːlaːs]) is a legendary figure based on Saint Nicholas, patron saint of children. Other Dutch names for the figure include De Sint ("The Saint"), De Goede Sint ("The Good Saint") and De Goedheiligman ("The Good Holy Man"). (Note: De Goedheiligman may also be derived from goed hylickman meaning "good marriage man", alluding to his historical reputation as a Saint who can help you find a good life partner.)

Many descendants and cognates of "Sinterklaas" or "Saint Nicholas" in other languages are also used in the Low Countries, nearby regions, and former Dutch colonies. (Note: Those include Sanikolas in Papiamento; Saint Nicolas in French; Sinteklaas in West Frisian; Sinterklaos in Limburgs; Sunterklaos or Sünnerklaas in Low Saxon; Sintekloai in West Flemish; Kleeschen and Zinniklos in Luxembourgish; Sankt Nikolaus or Nikolaus in German; and Sint Nicholas in Afrikaans.)

The feast of Sinterklaas celebrates the name day of Saint Nicholas on 6 December. The Sinterklaas feast is celebrated annually with the giving of gifts on St. Nicholas' Eve (5 December) in the Netherlands and on the morning of Saint Nicholas Day (6 December) in Belgium, Luxembourg, western Germany, and northern France (French Flanders, Lorraine, Alsace and Artois). The tradition is also celebrated in some territories of the former Dutch Empire, including Aruba.

Sinterklaas is one of the sources of the popular Christmas icon of Santa Claus.

== Figures ==
=== Sinterklaas ===
Sinterklaas is based on the historical figure of Saint Nicholas (270–343), a Greek bishop of Myra in present-day Turkey. He is depicted as an elderly, stately and serious man with white hair and a long, full beard. He wears a long red cape or chasuble over a traditional white bishop's alb and a sometimes-red stole, dons a red mitre and ruby ring, and holds a gold-coloured crosier, a long ceremonial shepherd's staff with a fancy curled top.

He traditionally arrives in a steamboat from Spain and rides a white horse. In the Netherlands, the televised Sinterklaas specials have named the horse. Until 2019, Sinterklaas rode Amerigo, who was "pensioned" (i.e., died) and replaced with a horse called Ozosnel ("oh so fast"), after a passage in a well-known Sinterklaas song. In Belgium, the horse is named Slecht weer vandaag, meaning "bad weather today" or Mooi weer vandaag ("nice weather today").

Sinterklaas carries a big, red book which traditionally records whether each child has been good or naughty in the past year.

=== Zwarte Piet ===
Sinterklaas is assisted by Zwarte Piet ("Black Pete"), a helper dressed in Moorish attire and in a black-painted face. Zwarte Piet first appeared in print as the nameless servant of Saint Nicholas in Saint Nicholas and his servant, published in 1850 by Amsterdam schoolteacher Jan Schenkman; however, the tradition appears to date back at least as far as the early 19th century. Zwarte Piet's colourful dress is based on 16th-century noble attire, with a ruff (lace collar) and a feathered cap. He is typically depicted carrying a bag which contains candy for the children, which he tosses around, a tradition supposedly originating in the story of Saint Nicholas saving three young girls from prostitution by tossing golden coins through their window at night to pay their dowries.

Traditionally, he would also carry a birch rod (Dutch: roe), a chimney sweep's broom made of willow branches, used to spank children who had been naughty. Some of the older Sinterklaas songs make mention of naughty children being put in Zwarte Piet's bag and being taken back to Spain. This part of the legend refers to the times that the Moors raided the European coasts, and as far as Iceland, to abduct the local people into slavery. This quality can be found in other companions of Saint Nicholas such as Krampus and Père Fouettard. In modern versions of the Sinterklaas feast, however, Zwarte Piet no longer carries the roe and children are no longer told that they will be taken back to Spain in Zwarte Piet's bag if they have been naughty.

Over the years many stories have been added, and Zwarte Piet has developed into a valuable assistant to the absent-minded saint. In modern adaptations for television, Sinterklaas has developed a Zwarte Piet for every function, such as a Head Piet (Hoofdpiet), a Navigation Piet (Wegwijspiet) to navigate the steamboat from Spain to the Netherlands, a Presents Piet (Pakjespiet) to wrap all the gifts, and Acrobatic Piet to climb roofs and chimneys. Traditionally Zwarte Piet's face is said to be black because he is a Moor from Spain. Today, some children are told that his face is blackened with soot because he has to climb through chimneys to deliver gifts for Sinterklaas.

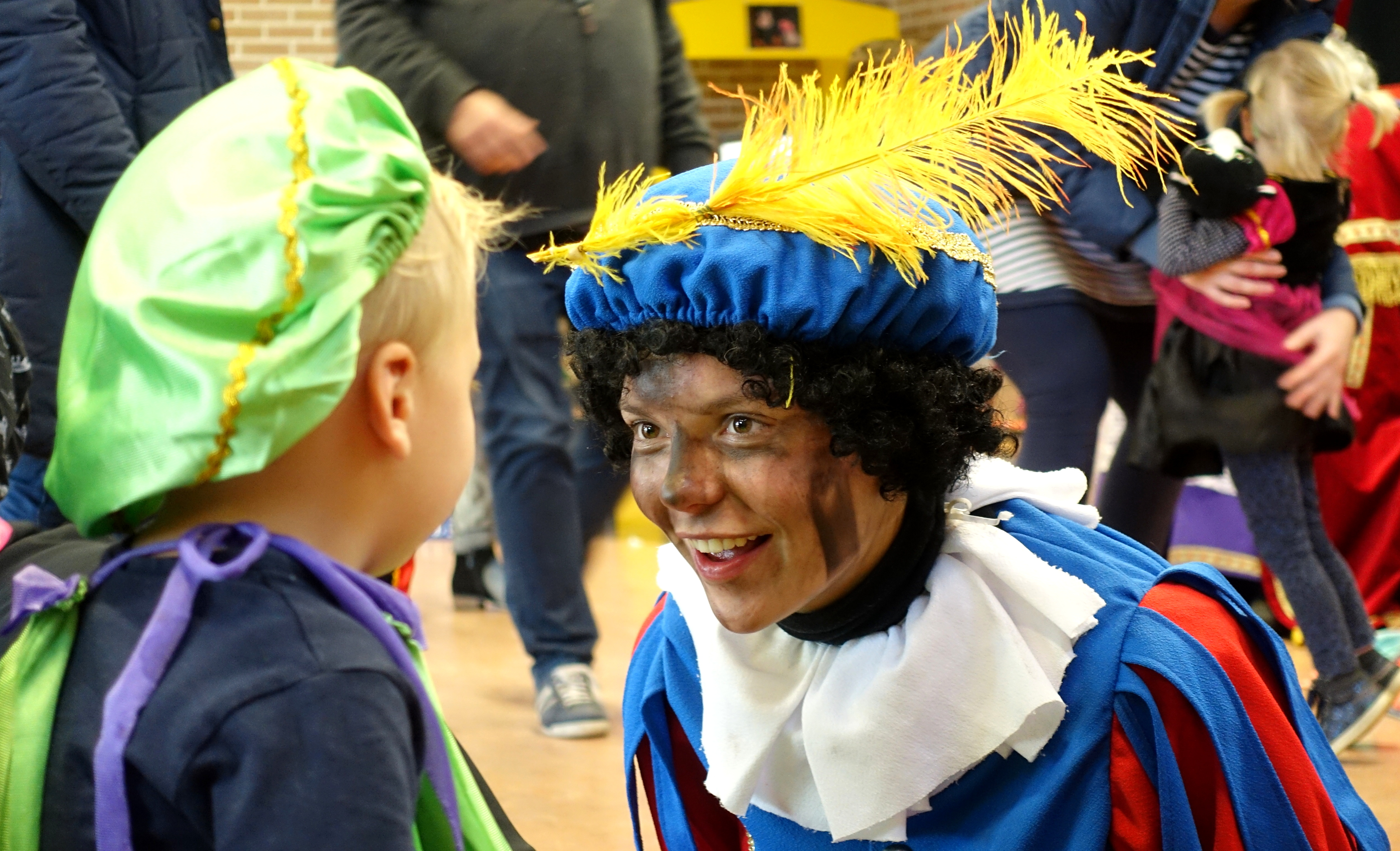
A person in costume as the modernized "Sooty Pete" version of Zwarte Piet

Since the 2010s, the traditions surrounding the holiday of Sinterklaas have been the subject of a growing number of editorials, debates, documentaries, protests and even violent clashes at festivals. In most cities and television channels now only display Zwarte Piet characters with some soot smudges on the face rather than full blackface, so-called roetveegpieten ("soot-smudge Petes") or schoorsteenpieten ("chimney Petes"). In a 2013 survey, 92 per cent of the Dutch public did not perceive Zwarte Piet as racist or associate him with slavery, and 91 per cent were opposed to altering the character's appearance. In a similar survey in 2018, between 80 and 88 per cent of the Dutch public did not perceive Zwarte Piet as racist, and between 41 and 54 per cent were happy with the character's modernised appearance (a mix of roetveegpieten and blackface). A June 2020 survey saw a drop in support for leaving the character's appearance unaltered: 47 per cent of those surveyed supported the traditional appearance, compared to 71 per cent in a similar survey held in November 2019. Prime Minister Mark Rutte stated in a parliamentary debate on 5 June 2020 that he had changed his opinion on the issue and now has more understanding for people who consider the character's appearance to be racist.

== Celebration ==
In the Netherlands, Sinterklaas is a very popular tradition. The festival is celebrated by a wide range of people including Dutch Jews and Muslims, and by generally all age groups. However, a 2023 survey showed that most are "less keen" to celebrate following the controversy surrounding Zwarte Piet.

=== Arrival from Spain ===
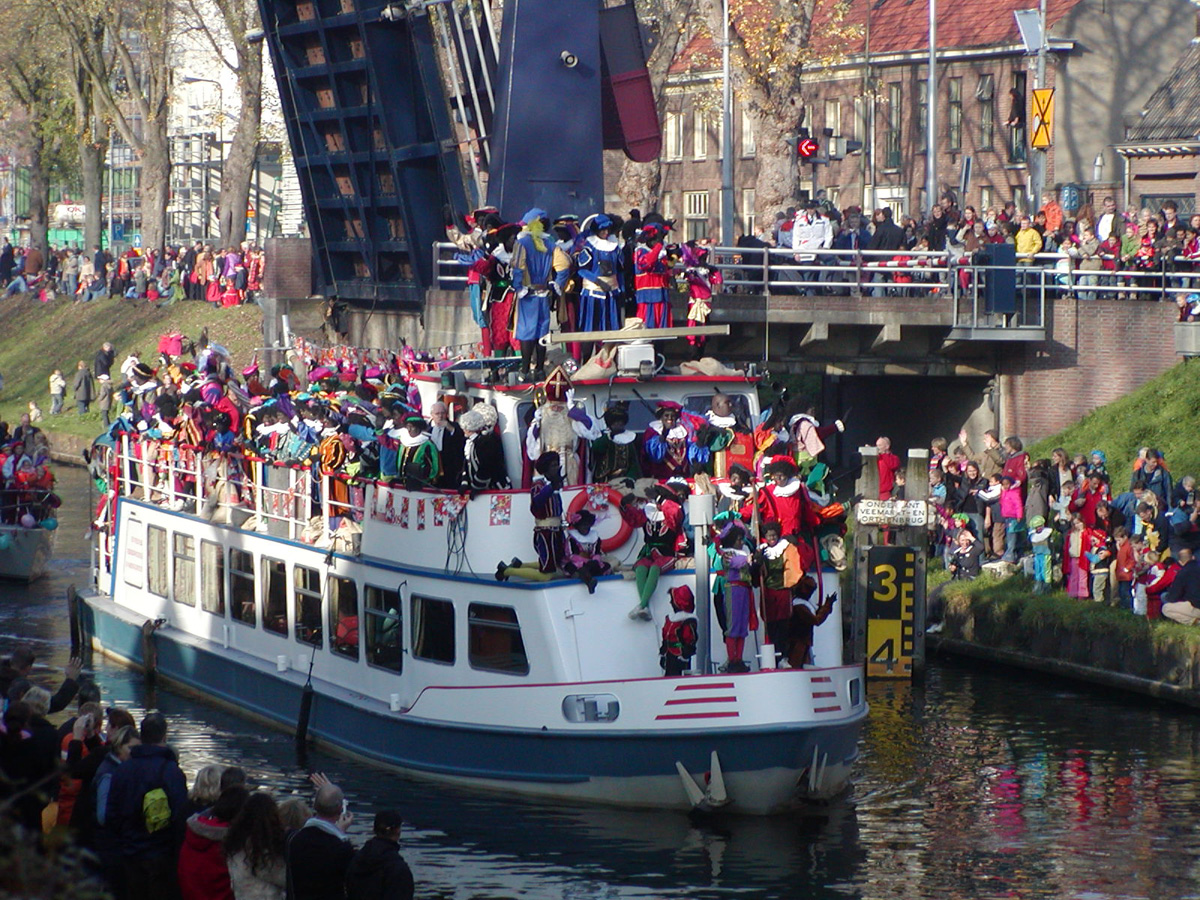
Sinterklaas and his Zwarte Piet helpers arriving by steamboat from Spain

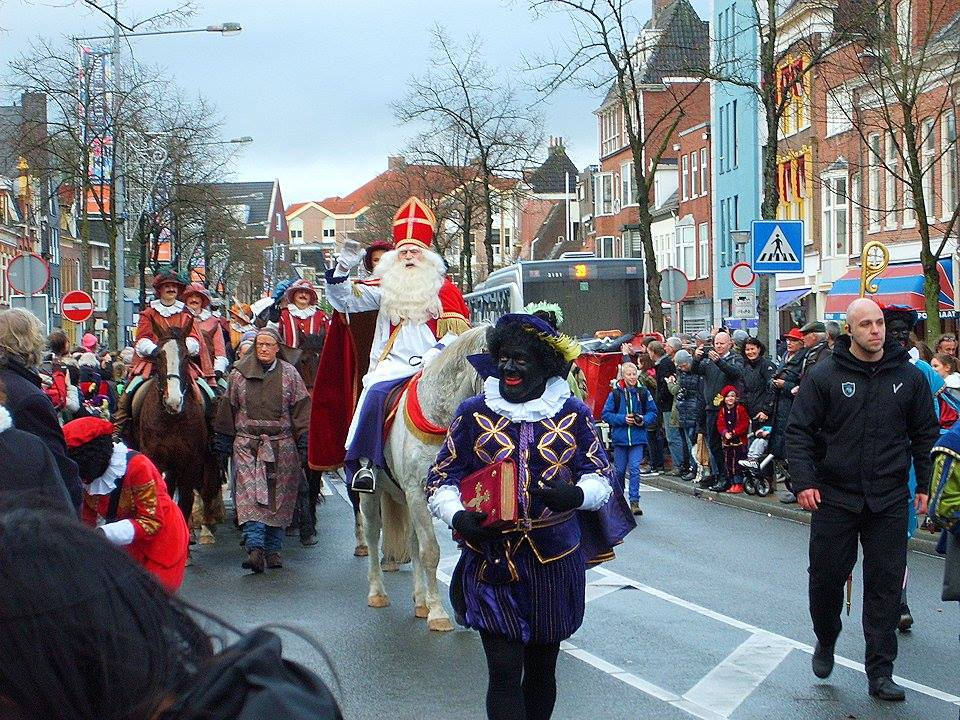
Sinterklaas arriving in Groningen in 2015

The festivities traditionally begin each year in mid-November The first Saturday after 11 November (St. Martin's Day), when Sinterklaas "arrives" by a steamboat at a designated seaside town, supposedly from Spain. In the Netherlands, this takes place in a different port each year, whereas in Belgium it always takes place in the city of Antwerp. The steamboat anchors, then Sinterklaas disembarks and parades through the streets on his horse, welcomed by children cheering and singing traditional Sinterklaas songs. His Zwarte Piet assistants throw candy and small, round, gingerbread-like cookies, either kruidnoten or pepernoten, into the crowd. The event is broadcast live on national television in the Netherlands and Belgium.

Following this national arrival, other towns celebrate their own intocht van Sinterklaas (arrival of Sinterklaas). Local arrivals usually take place later on the same Saturday of the national arrival, the next day (Sunday), or one weekend after the national arrival. In places a boat cannot reach, Sinterklaas arrives by train, horse, horse-drawn carriage or even a fire truck.

Sinterklaas is said to come from Spain, possibly because in 1087, half of Saint Nicholas' relics were transported to the Italian city of Bari, which later formed part of the Spanish Kingdom of Naples. Others suggest that mandarin oranges, traditionally gifts associated with Saint Nicholas, led to the misconception that he must have been from Spain. This theory is backed by a Dutch poem documented in 1810 in New York and provided with an English translation:

Dutch

Sinterklaas, goedheiligman!
Trek uwe beste tabberd an,
Reis daar mee naar Amsterdam,
Van Amsterdam naar Spanje,
Daar Appelen van Oranje,
Daar Appelen van granaten,
Die rollen door de straten.

English

Saint Nicholas, good holy man!
Don your best robe,
Travel in it to Amsterdam,
From Amsterdam to Spain,
Where oranges,
And pomegranates,
Roll through the streets

The text presented here comes from a pamphlet that John Pintard released in New York in 1810. It is the earliest source mentioning Spain in connection to Sinterklaas. Pintard wanted Saint Nicholas to become the patron saint of New York and hoped to establish a Sinterklaas tradition. Apparently he got help from the Dutch community in New York, that provided him with the original Dutch Sinterklaas poem. Strictly speaking, the poem does not state that Sinterklaas comes from Spain, but that he needs to go to Spain to pick up the oranges and pomegranates. So the link between Sinterklaas and Spain goes through the oranges, a much-appreciated treat in the 19th century. Later, the connection with the oranges got lost, and Spain became his home. Traditionally, the city of origin of the steamboat has been the Spanish port city of Alicante. This could be based on the fact that Alicante's patron is Saint Nicholas, and that the city's cathedral, Concatedral de San Nicolás, is dedicated to this saint. The province of Alicante is also known for its oranges.

=== Period leading up to Saint Nicholas' Eve ===
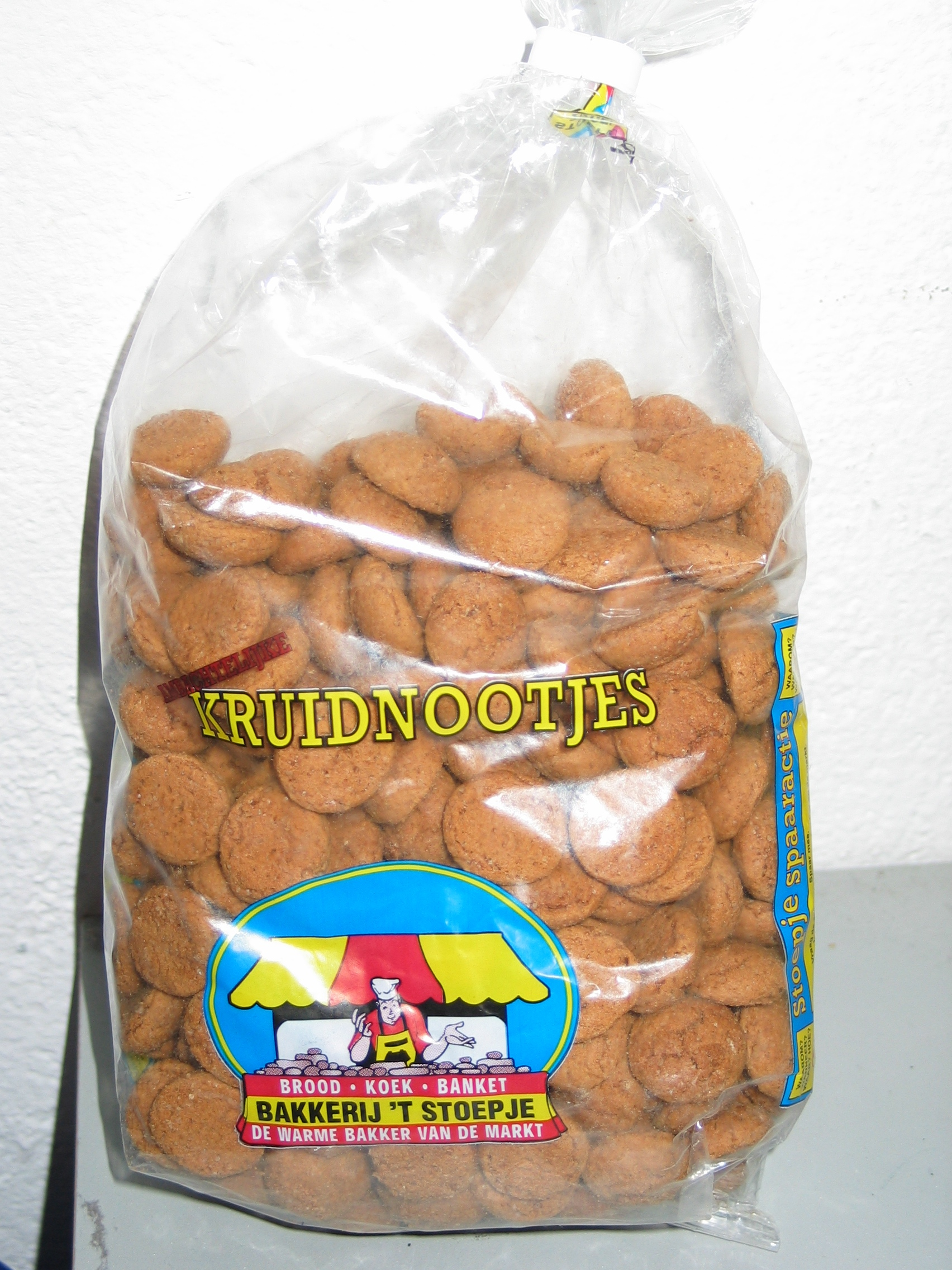
Kruidnoten, small, round gingerbread-like cookies

In the weeks between his arrival and 5 December, Sinterklaas visits schools, hospitals, and shopping centres. He is said to ride his white-grey horse over the rooftops at night, delivering gifts through the chimney to the well-behaved children. Traditionally, naughty children risked being caught by Black Pete, who carried a jute bag and willow cane for that purpose.

Before going to bed, children each leave a single shoe next to the fireplace chimney of the coal-fired stove or fireplace (or in modern times close to the central heating radiator, or a door). They leave the shoe with a carrot or some hay in it and a bowl of water nearby "for Sinterklaas' horse", and the children sing a Sinterklaas song. The next day, they find some candy or a small present in their shoes.

Typical Sinterklaas treats traditionally include mandarin oranges, pepernoten, speculaas (sometimes filled with almond paste), banketletter (pastry filled with almond paste) or a chocolate letter (the first letter of the child's name made out of chocolate), chocolate coins, suikerbeest (animal-shaped figures made of sugary confection), and marzipan figures. Newer treats include gingerbread biscuits and a figurine of Sinterklaas made of chocolate and wrapped in coloured aluminium foil.

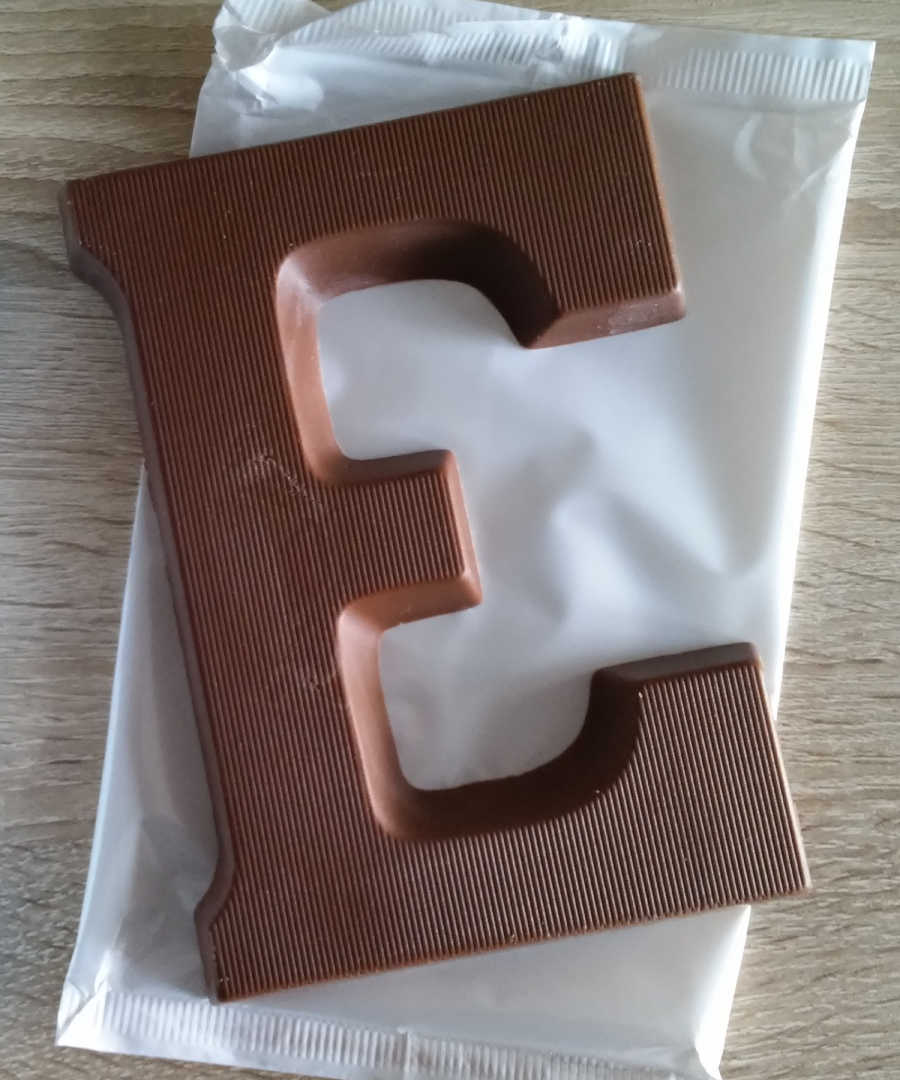
A chocolate letter, typical Sinterklaas candy in the Netherlands

=== Saint Nicholas' Eve and Saint Nicholas' Day ===
In the Netherlands, Saint Nicholas' Eve, 5 December, became the chief occasion for gift-giving during the winter holiday season. The evening is called Sinterklaasavond ("Sinterklaas evening") or Pakjesavond ("gifts evening", or literally "packages evening").

On the evening of 5 December, parents, family, friends or acquaintances pretend to act on behalf of "Sinterklaas", or his helpers, and fool the children into thinking that "Sinterklaas" has really given them presents. This may be done through a note that is "found", explaining where the presents are hidden, as though Zwarte Piet visited them and left a burlap sack of presents with them. Sometimes a neighbour will knock on the door (pretending to be a Zwarte Piet) and leave the sack outside for the children to retrieve; this varies per family. When the presents arrive, the living room is decked out with them, much as on Christmas Day in English-speaking countries. On 6 December "Sinterklaas" departs without any ado, and all festivities are over.

In the Southern Netherlands and Belgium, most children have to wait until the morning of 6 December to receive their gifts, and Sinterklaas is seen as a festivity almost exclusively for children. The shoes are filled with a poem or wish list for Sinterklaas and carrots, hay or sugar cubes for the horse on the evening of the fifth and in Belgium often a bottle of beer for Zwarte Piet and a cup of coffee for Sinterklaas are placed next to them. Also in some areas, when it is time for children to give up their pacifier, they place it into his or her shoe ("safekeeping by Sinterklaas") and it is replaced with chocolate the next morning.

The present is often creatively disguised by being packaged in a humorous, unusual or personalised way. This is called a surprise (from the French).

Poems from Sinterklaas usually accompany gifts, bearing a personal message for the receiver. It is usually a humorous poem which often teases the recipient for well-known bad habits or other character deficiencies.

In recent years, influenced by North-American media and the Anglo-Saxon Christmas tradition, when the children reach the age where they get told "the big secret of Sinterklaas", some people will shift to Christmas Eve or Christmas Day for the present giving. Older children in Dutch families where the children are too old to believe in Sinterklaas any more, also often celebrate Christmas with presents instead of pakjesavond. Instead of such gifts being brought by Sinterklaas, family members ordinarily draw names for an event comparable to Secret Santa. Because of the popularity of his "older cousin" Sinterklaas, Santa Claus is, however, not commonly seen in the Netherlands and Belgium.

== History ==
=== Pre-Christian Europe ===
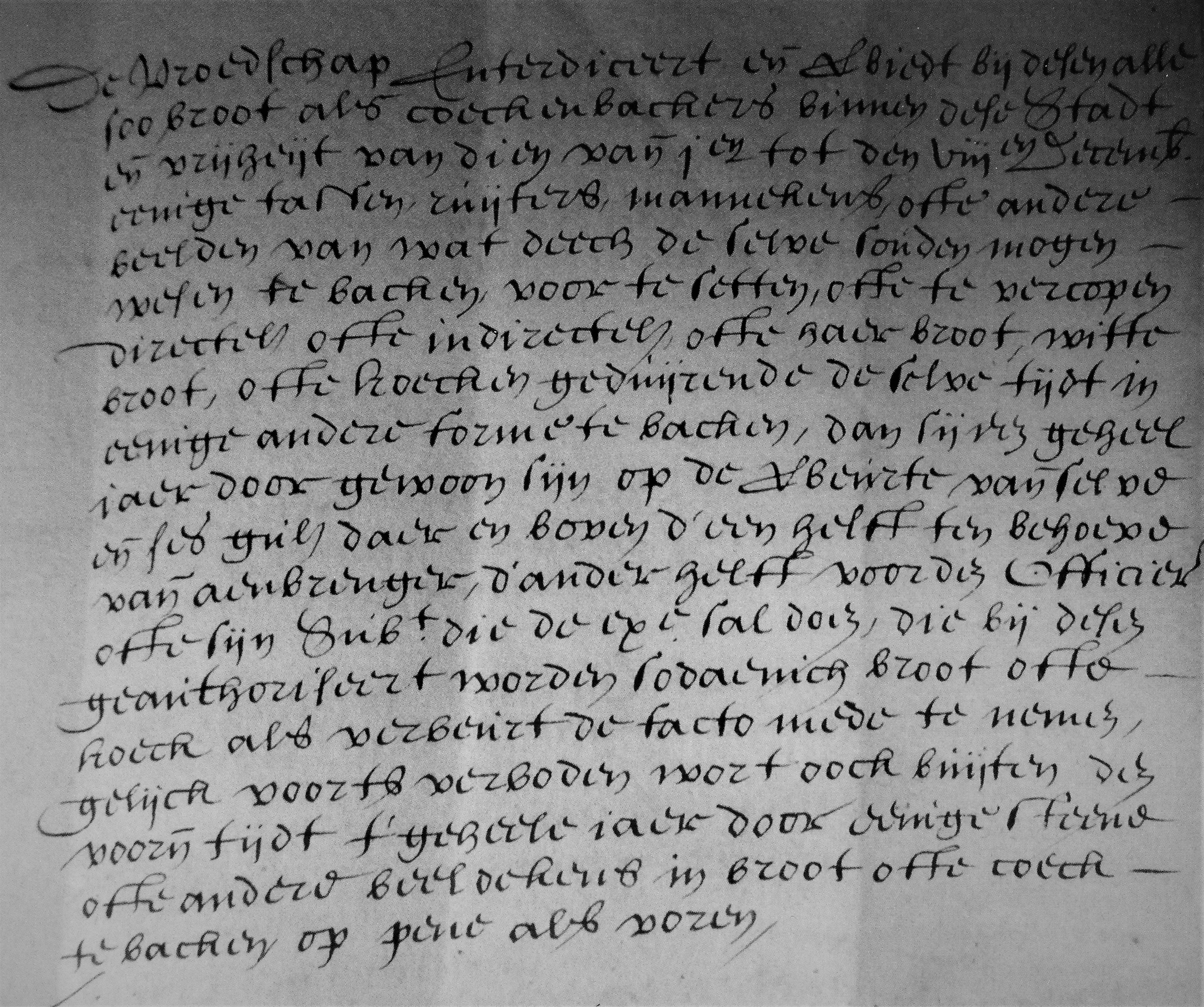
Municipal ban on Sint-Nicolaas pastry in the town of Utrecht during 1–8 December 1655 (to combat Catholic idolatry).

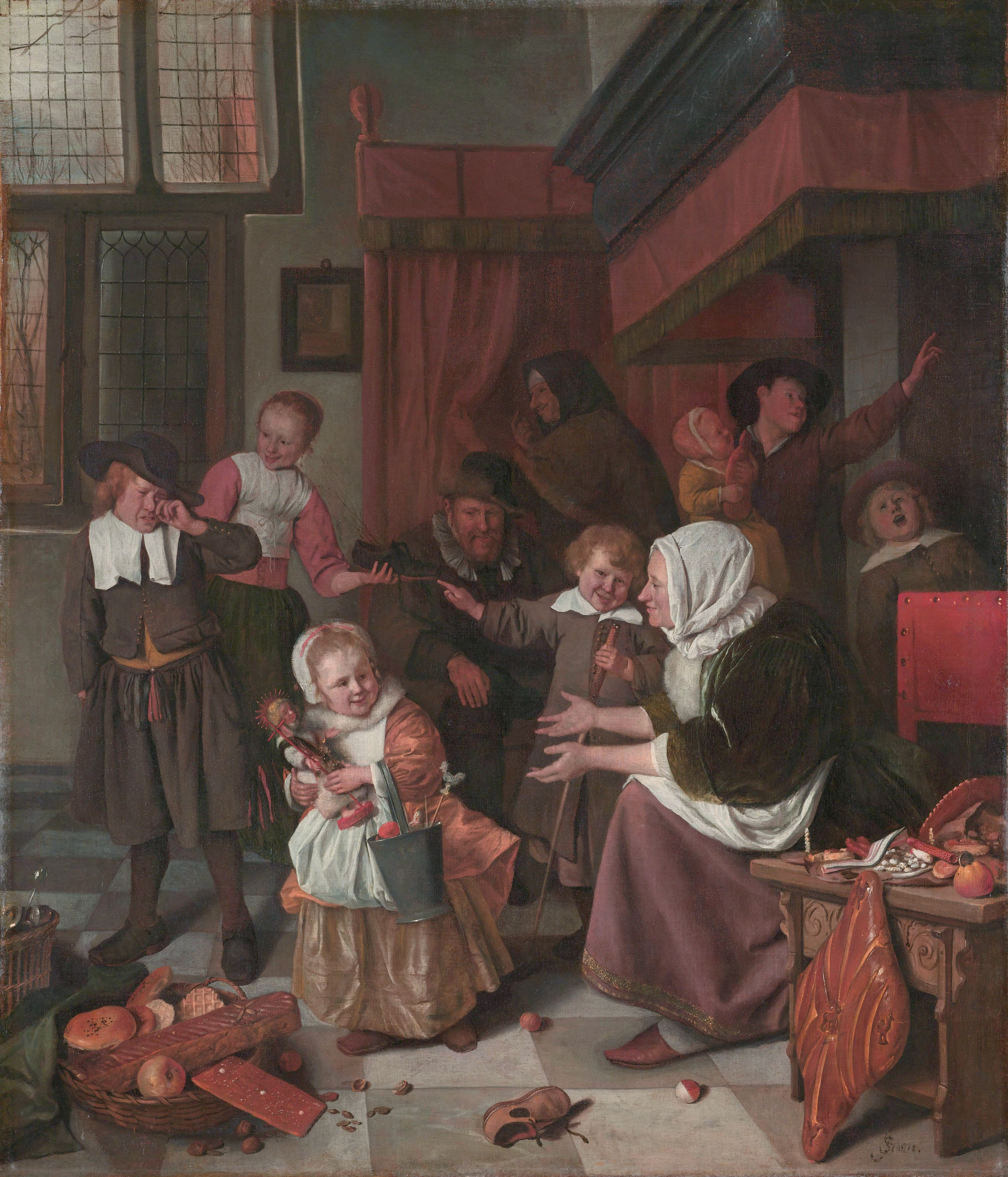
The Feast of Saint Nicholas, by Jan Steen, 1660s

Jacob Grimm, Hélène Adeline Guerber and others have drawn parallels between Sinterklaas and his helpers and the Wild Hunt of the Norse mythological god Wodan (also known as Odin), a major god among the Germanic peoples, who was worshipped in Northern and Western Europe prior to Christianization. Riding the white horse Sleipnir, he flew through the air as the leader of the Wild Hunt, always accompanied by two black ravens, Huginn and Muninn. Those helpers would listen, just like Zwarte Piet, at the chimney – which was just a hole in the roof at that time – to tell Wodan about the good and bad behaviour of the mortals. Historian Rita Ghesquiere asserts that it is likely that certain pre-christian elements survived in the honouring of Saint Nicholas. Indeed, it seems clear that the tradition contains a number of elements that are not ecclesiastical in origin.

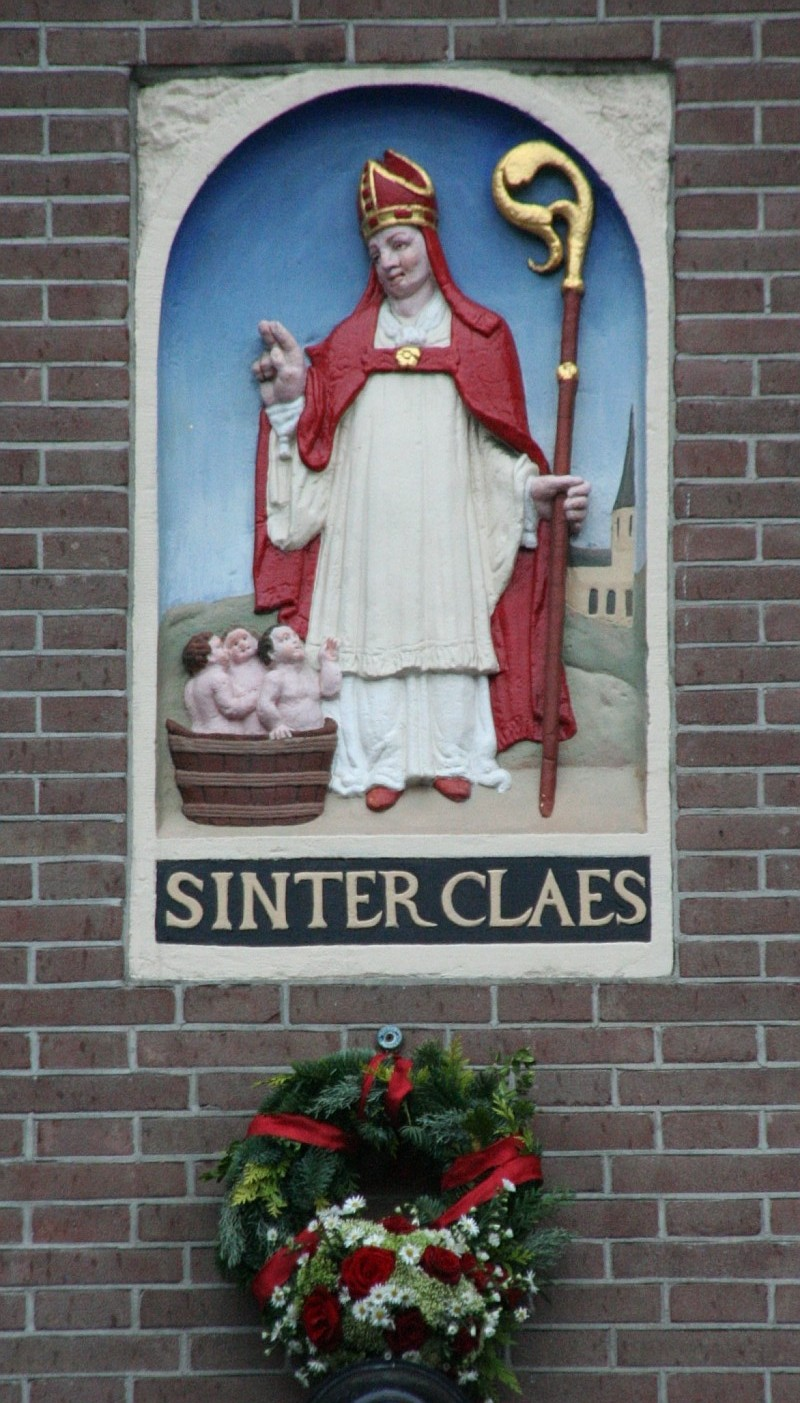
Sinter Claes depiction at a 16th-century house near the Dam in Amsterdam. Saint Nicholas is the patron saint of the city.

=== Middle Ages ===
The Sinterklaasfeest arose during the Middle Ages. The feast was both an occasion to help the poor, by putting money in their shoes (which evolved into putting presents in children's shoes) and a wild feast, similar to Carnival, that often led to costumes, a "topsy-turvy" overturning of daily roles, and mass public drunkenness.

In early traditions, students elected one of their classmates as "bishop" on St. Nicholas Day, who would rule until 28 December (Innocents Day), and they sometimes acted out events from the bishop's life. As the festival moved to city streets, it became more lively.

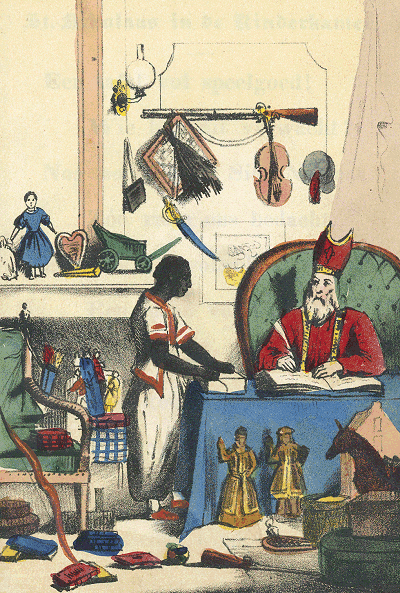
Illustration from the 1850 book St. Nikolaas en zijn knecht (Saint Nicholas and his servant), by Jan Schenkman, 1850

=== 16th and 17th centuries ===
During the Reformation in 16th- and 17th-century Europe, Protestant reformers like Martin Luther changed the Saint gift bringer to the Christ Child or Christkindl and moved the date for giving presents from 6 December to Christmas Eve. Certain Protestant municipalities and clerics forbade Saint Nicholas festivities, as the Protestants wanted to abolish the cult of saints and saint adoration, while keeping the midwinter gift-bringing feast alive.

After the successful revolt of the largely Protestant northern provinces of the Low Countries against the rule of Roman Catholic king Philip II of Spain, the new Calvinist regents, ministers and clericals prohibited celebration of Saint Nicholas. The newly independent Dutch Republic officially became a Protestant country and abolished public Catholic celebrations. Nevertheless, the Saint Nicholas feast never completely disappeared in the Netherlands. In Amsterdam, where the public Saint Nicholas festivities were very popular, main events like street markets and fairs were kept alive with persons impersonating Nicholas dressed in red clothes instead of a bishop's tabard and mitre. The Dutch government eventually tolerated private family celebrations of Saint Nicholas' Day, as can be seen on Jan Steen's painting The Feast of Saint Nicholas.

=== 19th century ===
In the 19th century, the saint emerged from hiding and the feast became more secularised at the same time. The modern tradition of Sinterklaas as a children's feast was likely confirmed with the illustrated children's book Sint-Nicolaas en zijn knecht (Saint Nicholas and his servant), written in 1850 by the teacher Jan Schenkman (1806–1863). Some say he introduced the images of Sinterklaas' delivering presents by the chimney, riding over the roofs of houses on a grey horse, and arriving from Spain by steamboat, which at that time was an exciting modern invention. Perhaps building on the fact that Saint Nicholas historically is the patron saint of the sailors (many churches dedicated to him have been built near harbours), Schenkman could have been inspired by the Spanish customs and ideas about the saint when he portrayed him arriving via the water in his book. Schenkman introduced the song Zie ginds komt de stoomboot ("Look over yonder, the steamboat is arriving"), which is still popular in the Netherlands.

In Schenkman's version, the medieval figures of the mock devil, which later changed to Oriental or Moorish helpers, was portrayed for the first time as black African and called Zwarte Piet (Black Pete).

=== World War II ===
During the German occupation of the Netherlands (1940–1945) many of the traditional Sinterklaas rhymes were rewritten to reflect current events. The Royal Air Force (RAF) was often celebrated. In 1941, for instance, the RAF dropped boxes of candy over the occupied Netherlands. One classical poem turned contemporary was the following:

Dutch

Sinterklaas, kapoentje,
Gooi wat in mijn schoentje,
Gooi wat in mijn laarsje,
Dank U Sinterklaasje

World War II version

R.A.F. Kapoentje,
Gooi wat in mijn schoentje,
Bij de Moffen gooien,
Maar in Holland strooien!

English

Sinterklaas, little capon,
Throw something in my little shoe,
Throw something in my little boot,
Thank you dear Sinterklaas

World War II version

R.A.F. little Capon,
throw something in my little shoe
throw [bombs] at the Krauts
but scatter [candy] in Holland!

This is a variation of one of the best-known traditional Sinterklaas rhymes, with "RAF" replacing "Sinterklaas" in the first line (the two expressions have the same metrical characteristics in the first and second, and in the third and fourth lines). The Dutch word kapoentje (little rascal) is traditional to the rhyme, but in this case it also alludes to a capon. The second line is straight from the original rhyme, but in the third and fourth line the RAF is encouraged to drop bombs on the Moffen (slur for Germans, like "krauts" in English) and candy over the Netherlands. Many of the Sinterklaas poems of this time noted the lack of food and basic necessities, and the German occupiers having taken everything of value; others expressed admiration for the Dutch Resistance.

Originally Sinterklaas was only accompanied by one (or sometimes two) Zwarte Pieten, but just after the liberation of the Netherlands, Canadian soldiers organised a Sinterklaas party with many Zwarte Pieten, and ever since this has been the custom, each Piet normally having his own dedicated task.

== Popularity and celebration outside the Netherlands ==
The festival has also been adhered in the former Dutch colonies. In Curaçao, Dutch-style Sinterklaas events were organised until 2020. The Zwarte Piet costumes were purple, gold, blue, yellow and orange but especially black and dark black. Prime Minister Ivar Asjes has spoken negatively of the tradition. In 2011, the government of Gerrit Schotte threatened to withdraw the grant for the Dutch tradition after the Curaçaoan activist Quinsy Gario was arrested, when he protested in Dordrecht against the use of Zwarte Piet. Since 2020, the Sinterklaas feast is no longer nationally celebrated in Curaçao and has been replaced by Children's Day on 20 November.

Dutch-style Sinterklaas events were also organised in Suriname. In 1970 the Surinamese playwright Eugène Drenthe envisioned the character of Gudu Ppa ("Father of Riches" in Sranantongo) as a postcolonial replacement of Sinterklaas. Instead of a white man, Gudu Ppa was black. His helpers symbolised Suriname's different ethnic groups, replacing Zwarte Piet. Although promoted by the military regime in the eighties, Gudu Ppa never really caught on. In 2011, opposition member of parliament and former president Ronald Venetiaan called for an official ban on Sinterklaas because he considered Zwarte Piet to be a racist element. Since 2013, the Sinterklaas feast on 5 December has been replaced by Kinderdag ("Children's Day") in Suriname.

The Saint Nicholas Society of New York celebrates a feast on 6 December to this day. In the Hudson Valley region of New York, Sinterklaas is celebrated annually in the towns of Rhinebeck and Kingston because of the region's Dutch heritage. It includes Sinterklaas' crossing the Hudson River and then a parade.

== Sinterklaas as a source for Santa Claus ==
Sinterklaas is the basis for the North American figure of Santa Claus. It is often claimed that during the American War of Independence, the inhabitants of New York City, the former Dutch colonial town of New Amsterdam, reinvented their Sinterklaas tradition, as Saint Nicholas was a symbol of the city's non-English past. In the 1770s the New York Gazetteer noted that the feast day of "St. a Claus" was celebrated "by the descendants of the ancient Dutch families, with their usual festivities." In a study of the "children's books, periodicals and journals" of New Amsterdam, the scholar Charles Jones did not find references to Saint Nicholas or Sinterklaas. Not all scholars agree with Jones' findings, which he reiterated in a book in 1978. Howard G. Hageman, of New Brunswick Theological Seminary, maintains that the tradition of celebrating Sinterklaas in New York existed in the early settlement of the Hudson Valley. He agrees that "there can be no question that by the time the revival of St. Nicholas came with Washington Irving, the traditional New Netherlands observance had completely disappeared." However, Irving's stories prominently featured legends of the early Dutch settlers, so while the traditional practice may have died out, Irving's St. Nicholas may have been a revival of that dormant Dutch strand of folklore. In his 1812 revisions to A History of New York, Irving inserted a dream sequence featuring St. Nicholas soaring over treetops in a flying wagon – a creation others would later dress up as Santa Claus.

In New York two years earlier, John Pintard published a pamphlet with illustrations by Alexander Anderson, in which he calls for making Saint Nicholas the patron Saint of New York and starting a Sinterklaas tradition. He was apparently assisted by the Dutch because in his pamphlet he included an old Dutch Sinterklaas poem with an English translation. In the Dutch poem, Saint Nicholas is referred to as 'Sancta Claus'. Ultimately, his initiative helped Sinterklaas to pop up as Santa Claus in the Christmas celebration, which returned – freed of episcopal dignity and ties – via England and later Germany to Europe again.

During the Reformation in 16th–17th-century Europe, many Protestants changed the gift bringer from Sinterklaas to the Christ Child or Christkindl (corrupted in English to Kris Kringle). Similarly, the date of giving gifts changed from 5 or 6 December to Christmas Eve.

== Sinterklaas in fiction ==
In a scene in the 1947 film Miracle on 34th Street, a Dutch girl recognises Macy's department store Santa as Sinterklaas. They converse in Dutch and sing the Sinterklaas song while she sits on his lap: "Sinterklaas, kapoentje, / Gooi wat in mijn schoentje, / Gooi wat in mijn laarsje, / Dank U Sinterklaasje".

Santa Claus is portrayed as Sinterklaas in the 1985 film One Magic Christmas: he and his wife have Dutch accents, and she calls him Nicolaas. In lieu of elves, his helpers are "Christmas angels" who are deceased people of all nationalities.

Sinterklaas has been the subject of a number of Dutch novels, films and television series, primarily aimed at children. Sinterklaas-themed children's films include Winky's Horse (2005) and the sequel Where Is Winky's Horse? (2007).

Sinterklaas-themed films aimed at adults include the drama Makkers Staakt uw Wild Geraas (1960), which won a Silver Bear award at the 11th Berlin International Film Festival; the romantic comedy Alles is Liefde (2007) and its Belgian remake Zot van A. (2010); and the Dick Maas-directed horror film Sint (2010).

De Club van Sinterklaas is a Sinterklaas-themed soap opera aimed at children. The popular television series has run since 1999 and has had a number of spin-off series. Since 2001, a Sinterklaas "news" program aimed at children is broadcast daily on Dutch television during the holiday season, Het Sinterklaasjournaal. The Dutch-Belgian Nickelodeon series Slot Marsepeinstein was aired from 2009 until 2013.

Much of the first half of the 2007 novella A War of Gifts by Orson Scott Card is about the Sinterklaas tradition, including chapter 4 "Sinterklaas Eve" and 5 "Sinterklaas Day".

In the fourth episode of the television series The Librarians ("And Santa's Midnight Ride"), Santa (Bruce Campbell) is an "immortal avatar" who has existed in many different incarnations throughout history. After experiencing mistletoe poisoning, he briefly turns into Sinterklaas, using his magic to play tricks and make toys appear in people's shoes, before regaining control of his current incarnation.

From 1987 to 2012 Sinterklaas also appeared every year in Sesamstraat, the Dutch version of Sesame Street.

== Related holiday figures ==
Other holiday figures based on Saint Nicholas are celebrated in some parts of Germany and Austria (Sankt Nikolaus); the Czech Republic and Slovakia (Mikuláš); Hungary (Mikulás); Switzerland (Samichlaus); Italy (San Nicola in Bari, South Tyrol, Alpine municipalities, and many others); parts of Bosnia and Herzegovina, Croatia and Serbia (Sveti Nikola); Slovenia (Sveti Nikolaj or Sveti Miklavž); Greece (Agios Nikolaos); Romania (Moș Nicolae); Albania (Shën Kolli, Nikolli), among others. See further: Saint Nicholas Day.

== See also ==
- Companions of Saint Nicholas
- Folklore of the Low Countries

== Bibliography ==
- Ghesquiere, Rita (1989). Van Nicolaas van Myra tot Sinterklaas. Acco. ISBN 9789061525561.
