= Shenkman =

Shenkman is a surname. Notable people with the surname include:

- Belle Shenkman (1928–1995), Canadian arts patron
- Ben Shenkman (born 1968), American actor
- Robert Shenkman (born 1996), British real tennis player

== See also ==
- Schenkman
- Shankman
