= Schenkman =

Schenkman is a surname. Notable people with the surname include:

- Byron Schenkman (born 1966), American musician, music director and educator
- Jan Schenkman (1806–1863), Dutch teacher, poet and writer
- Joe Schenkman (born 1947), American publisher and cartoonist
- Richard Schenkman (born 1958), American screenwriter, film producer, film director and actor

== See also ==
- Shenkman
