= Saint Nicholas and his servant =

1850 Dutch picture book

Sint Nikolaas en zijn knecht
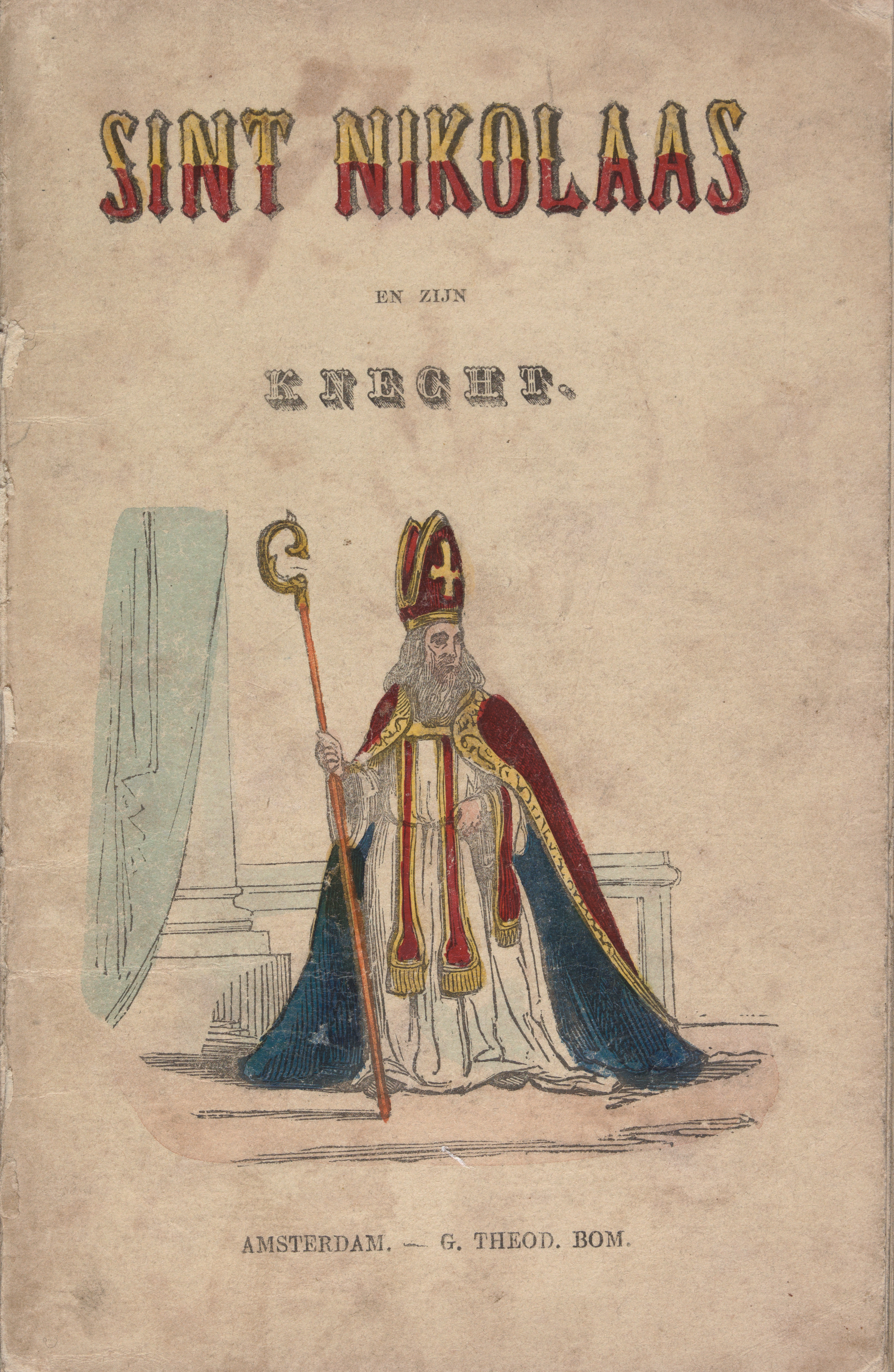
- Book cover of the first edition (1850)
- Author: Jan Schenkman
- Original title: Sint Nikolaas en zijn knecht
- Illustrator: Unknown
- Language: Dutch
- Genre: Children's literature
- Publisher: G. Theod. Bom
- Publication date: December 4, 1850
- Publication place: Netherlands
- Pages: 19
- ISBN: 9781979681582

Saint Nicholas and his servant (Sint Nikolaas en zijn knecht, 1850) is a Dutch picture book from 1850, written by Jan Schenkman. The book is about Sinterklaas' stay in the Netherlands, which he makes together with his servant.

As far as is known, the book is the first book in which Sinterklaas plays the leading role and does not play a supporting role, as in other books in which Sinterklaas appeared. The book can also be seen as the basis for the current Sinterklaas tradition in the Netherlands and Belgium, because many elements that play a role in the book (arrival by steamboat, Sinterklaas has a servant) were later added to the Sinterklaas tradition in those countries.

The picture book is also the first book in which Sinterklaas has a servant. In the beginning, the servant does not have a name, but in later editions he was changed to the figure that is now known as Zwarte Piet. Because of this, Schenkman is also seen as the creator of Zwarte Piet.

The book has an educational function. The book teaches children to behave well. The book also teaches children not to do naughty things, because otherwise they will be punished by Sinterklaas.

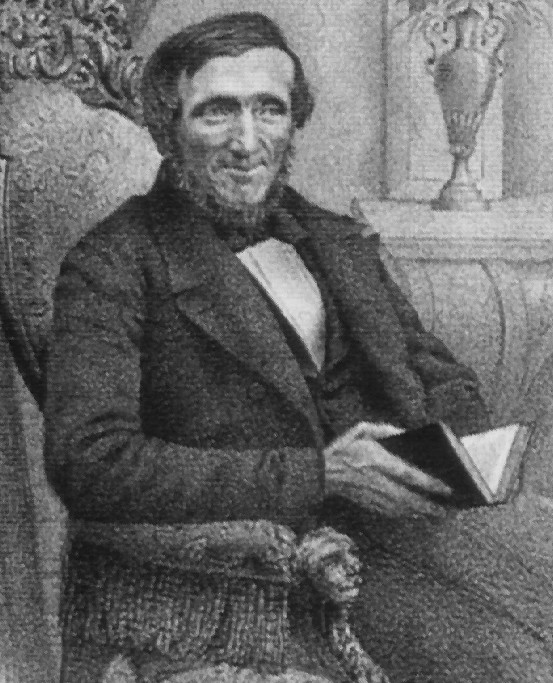
Jan Schenkman

== Background ==
The picture book was written by the Dutch teacher and poet Jan Schenkman (1806–1863). At the age of twenty-two, he became a teacher at a poor school in Amsterdam. He was mainly specialized in teaching arithmetic and language.

In addition to his school activities, Schenkman was also politically active. He was a member of the Maatschappij tot Nut van ’t Algemeen, which focused on matters that served the general interest, such as education, development and social debate. The organization also contributed to democratization in the Netherlands.

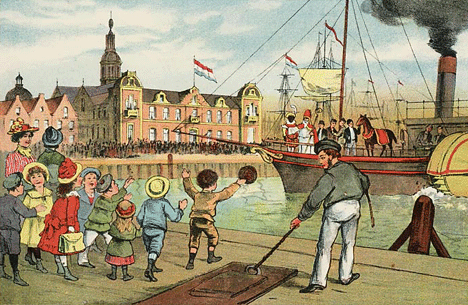
Sinterklaas arrives in the Netherlands (1905)

His political activities ultimately led to his dismissal as a teacher in 1849. The reason for this was his participation in the Dam protest in 1848, which caused a lot of damage in Amsterdam. The school board considered Schenkman too radical and therefore unsuitable to be a teacher.

After his dismissal, Schenkman focused on writing poems, for weddings and other festivities, among other things. Because of his activities as a poet, Schenkman was employed by the book publisher G. Theod. Bom, to write children's poems. Later, Schenkman also wrote his own children's books, which were published by the publisher G. Theod. Bom. One of his first books was Saint Nicholas and his servant.

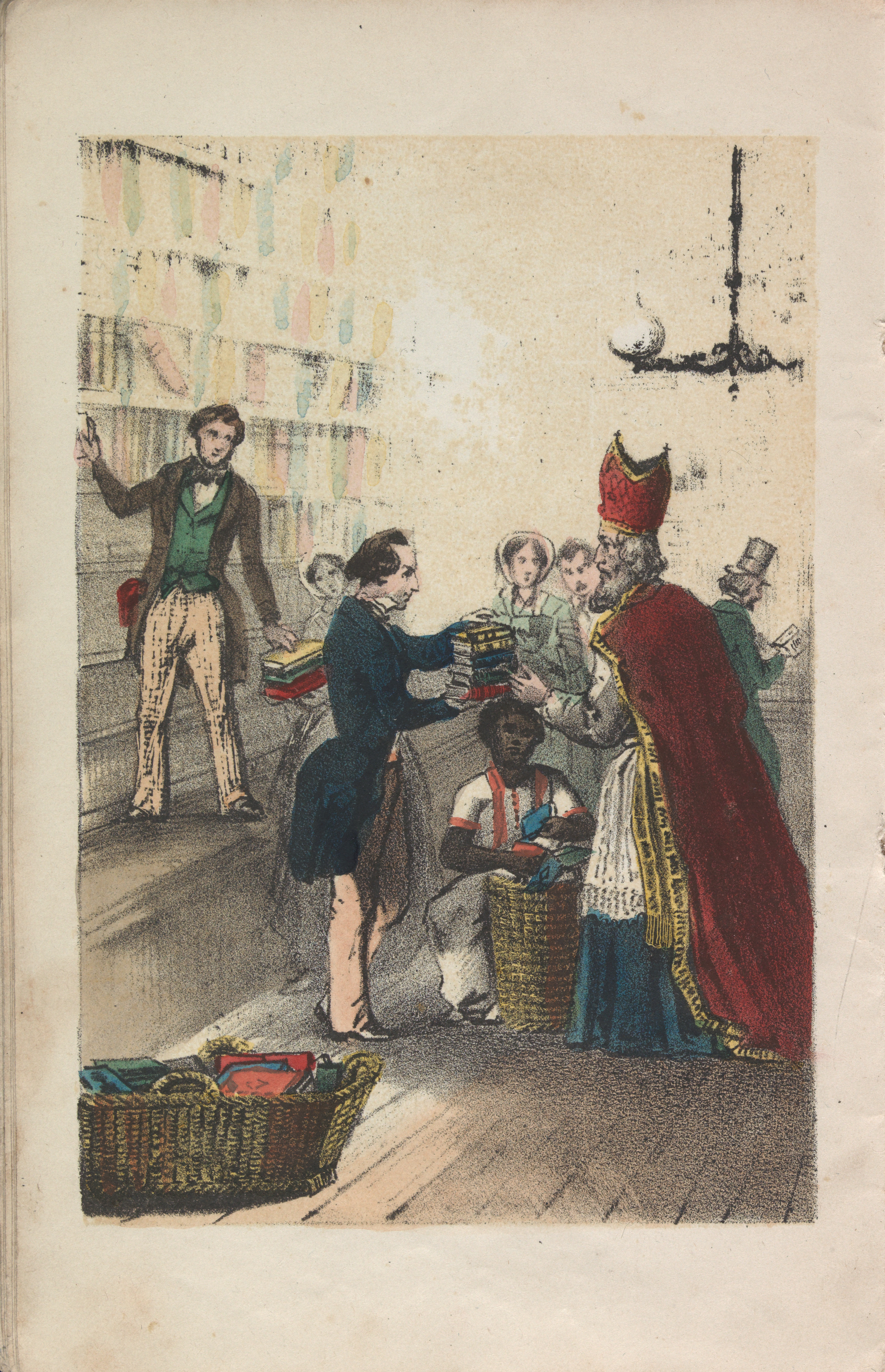
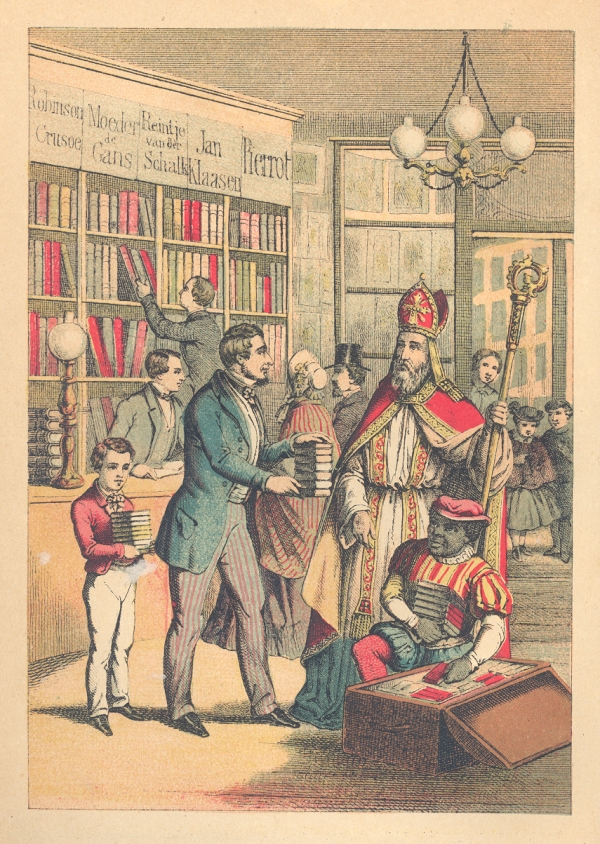
On the left an illustration from the 1850 edition, in which Sinterklaas has a black page as a servant. On the right an illustration from the 1880 edition, in which the modern Zwarte Piet can be seen.

The book Saint Nicholas and his servant is special because it is the first book in which Sinterklaas plays a leading role. In the past, books were also written about Sinterklaas, but in those books he was a secondary character. In addition, the book has contributed to the current way in which the festival is celebrated in the Netherlands and Belgium. For example, Sinterklaas arrives with his steamboat, which comes from Spain, and he has a servant who helps him.

Schenkman also designed the image of how Sinterklaas looks and acts. Previously, Sinterklaas was a mythical, dark figure who often scared children. Schenkman changed the figure of Sinterklaas from a scarer to a friendly, old bishop, who rewards the children when they were good and punishes them when they were naughty. The appearance of Sinterklaas, a bishop in red clothes, a staff and a beard, was also devised by Schenkman himself.

Schenkman also added a new element to the Sinterklaas tradition that later developed into the figure of Zwarte Piet. In the first editions, the servant was a nameless figure, later he became a black Moorish page who helped Sinterklaas and went on his way with him. In later editions, the figure is known as Zwarte Piet, who helps Sinterklaas, shows clownish behaviour and who puts naughty children in a sack and later takes them to Spain.

== Structure ==
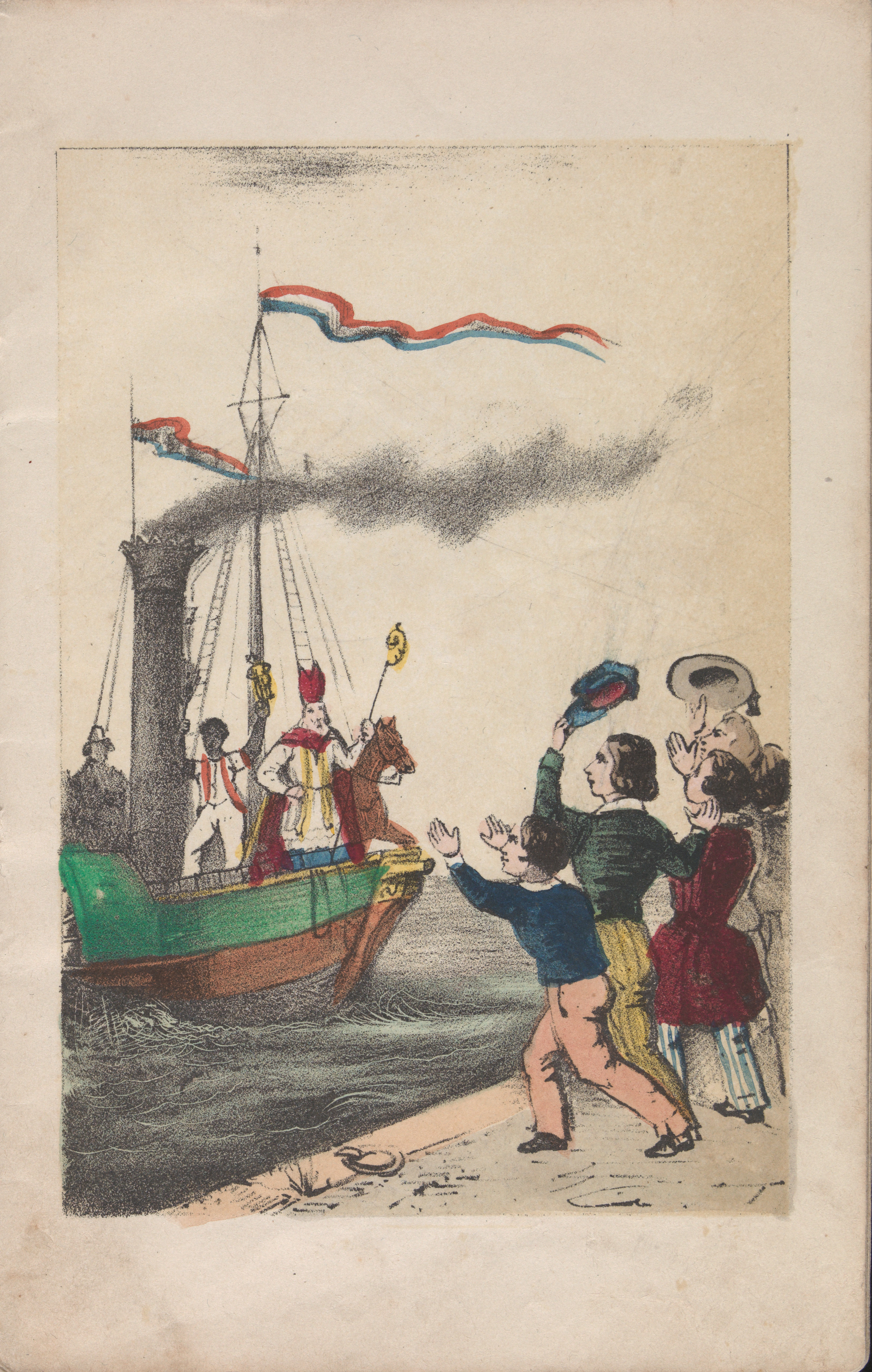
Sinterklaas arrives in the Netherlands

The book consists of sixteen short poems, each consisting of twelve lines of verse. The poem is provided with an illustration, in which the poem is depicted. The poems describe the stay of Sinterklaas and his servant. For example, Sinterklaas visits a school, he goes to various shops to buy presents and sweets and the poems describe his visits to poor, rich, good and naughty children.

== Story ==
Here is a summary of the poems from the picture book:

=== Arrival of Sinterklaas ===
Sinterklaas arrives in the Netherlands with his steamboat. On the quay are many children and adults who want to receive Sinterklaas. Sinterklaas' servant is laughing at the crowd. He shouts to the children that whoever is good gets candy and whoever is naughty gets the rod.

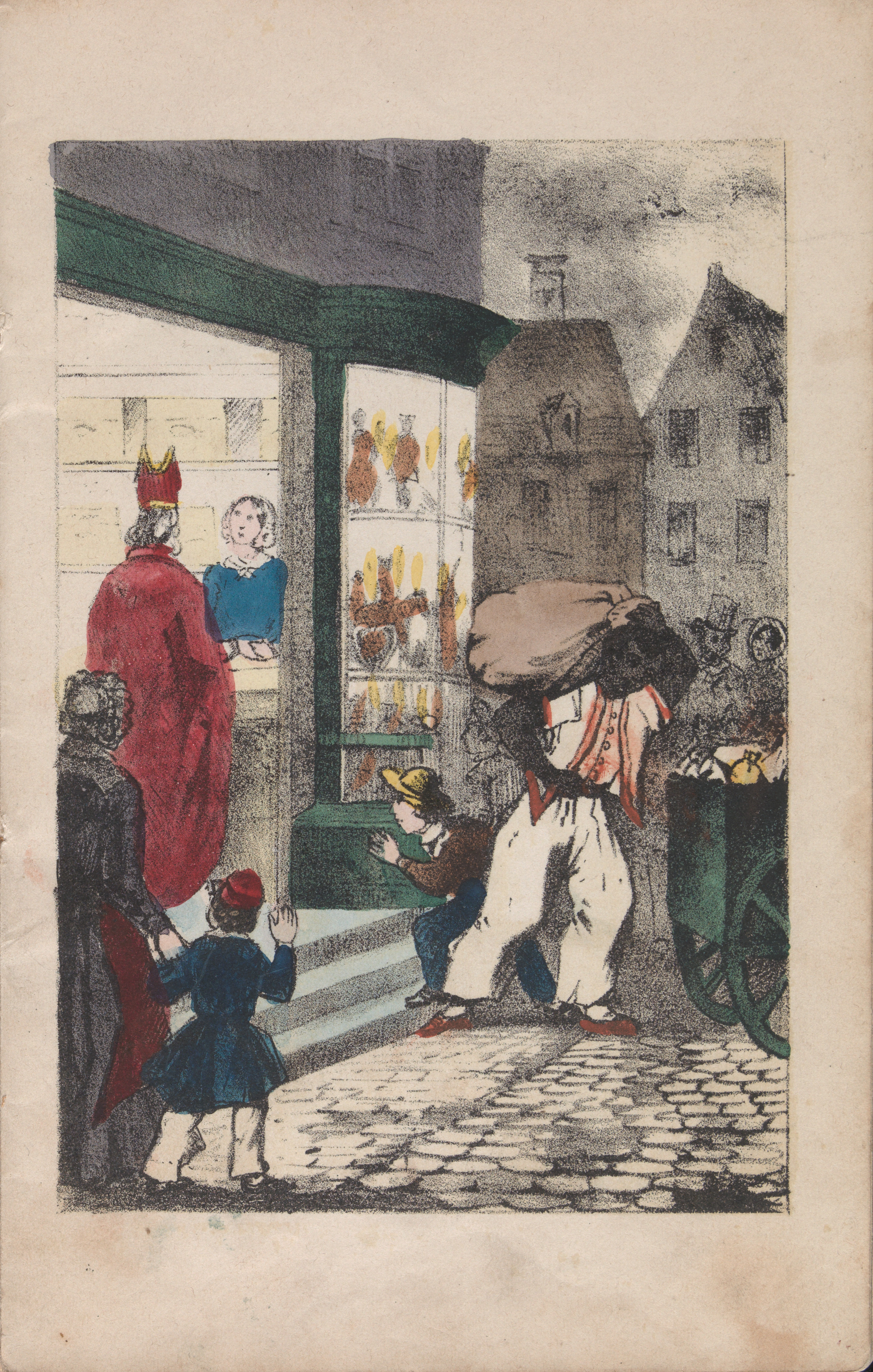
Sinterklaas and his servant at the pastry shop

=== Solemn entry of Sinterklaas ===
Sinterklaas rides through the city on his horse. Many people stand along the road to watch the entry of Sinterklaas and throw flowers to Sinterklaas. In the meantime, the servant carries a chest with money, which Sinterklaas needs to buy his gifts. The naughty child Willem is afraid of Sinterklaas and therefore hides from him. But that is no use, because Sinterklaas had already seen Willem.

=== Sinterklaas at the Pastry Chef ===
Sinterklaas visits the pastry chef. He decided to buy some pastries and cookies for the children. In the meantime, the servant leaves all the shops with pastries and cookies in. In the meantime, many children look at Sinterklaas from the shop window, out of curiosity to see if they might also watch something.

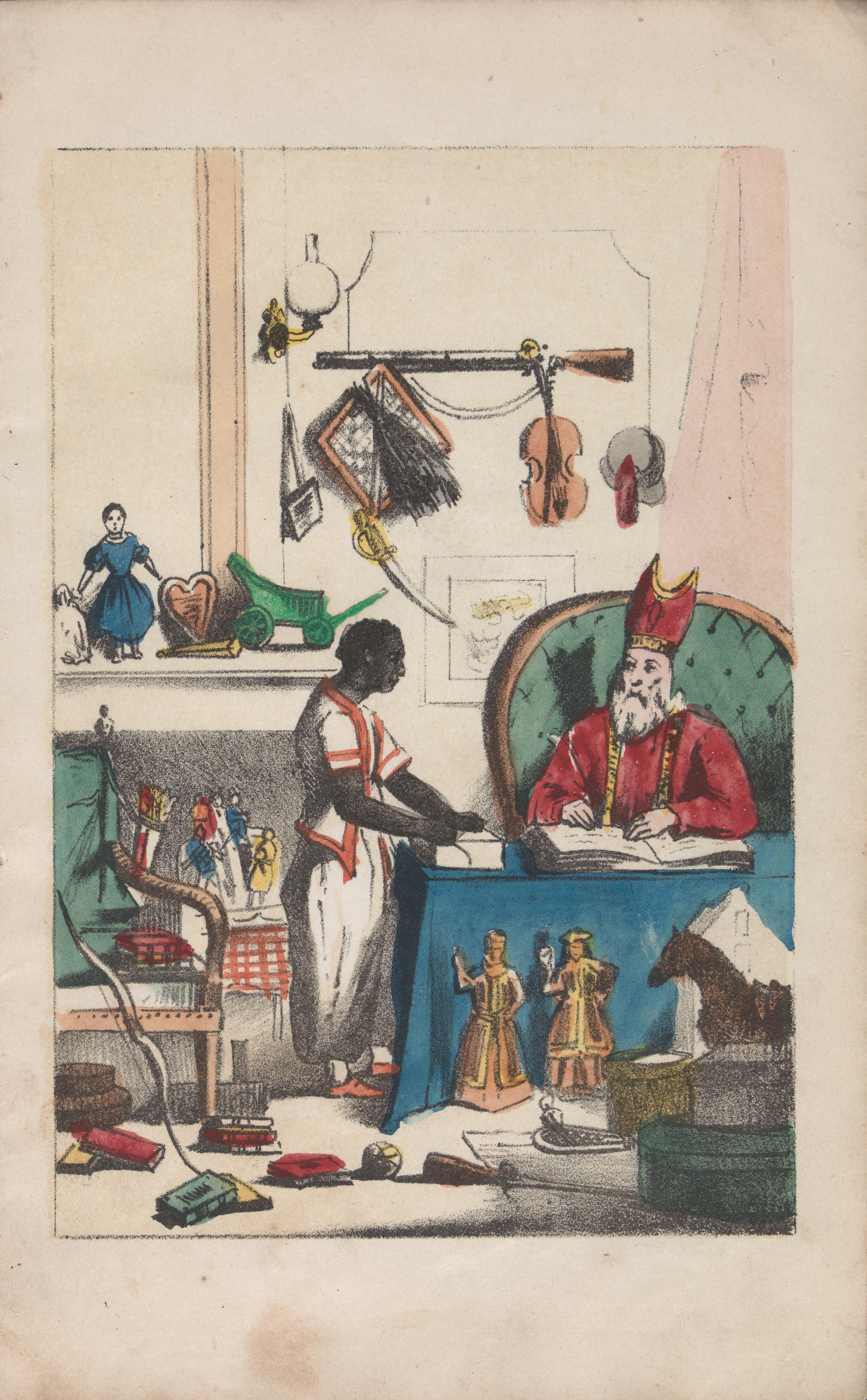
Sinterklaas with his servant in his study

=== Sinterklaas in the Bookshop ===
Sinterklaas is in the bookshop, to buy picture books. The owner kindly receives him. The servant helps Sinterklaas again with loading the goods.

=== Sinterklaas on the Chimney ===
Sinterklaas and his servant are standing on the roof with their horses. They are listening at the chimneys, to hear whether the children are good or naughty. Some children see Sinterklaas and the servant sitting on the roof below. They wish they could come to Sinterklaas, but say that is not possible, because Sinterklaas is on the roof.

=== Sinterklaas Listens at the Door ===
A family is sitting in a room. In the meantime, they do not realize that Sinterklaas is listening at the door, to hear whether the children are good or naughty. He also listens well to learning at school and whether they listen to their parents. The servant also listens along, to inform Sinterklaas about the things he has not been able to hear.

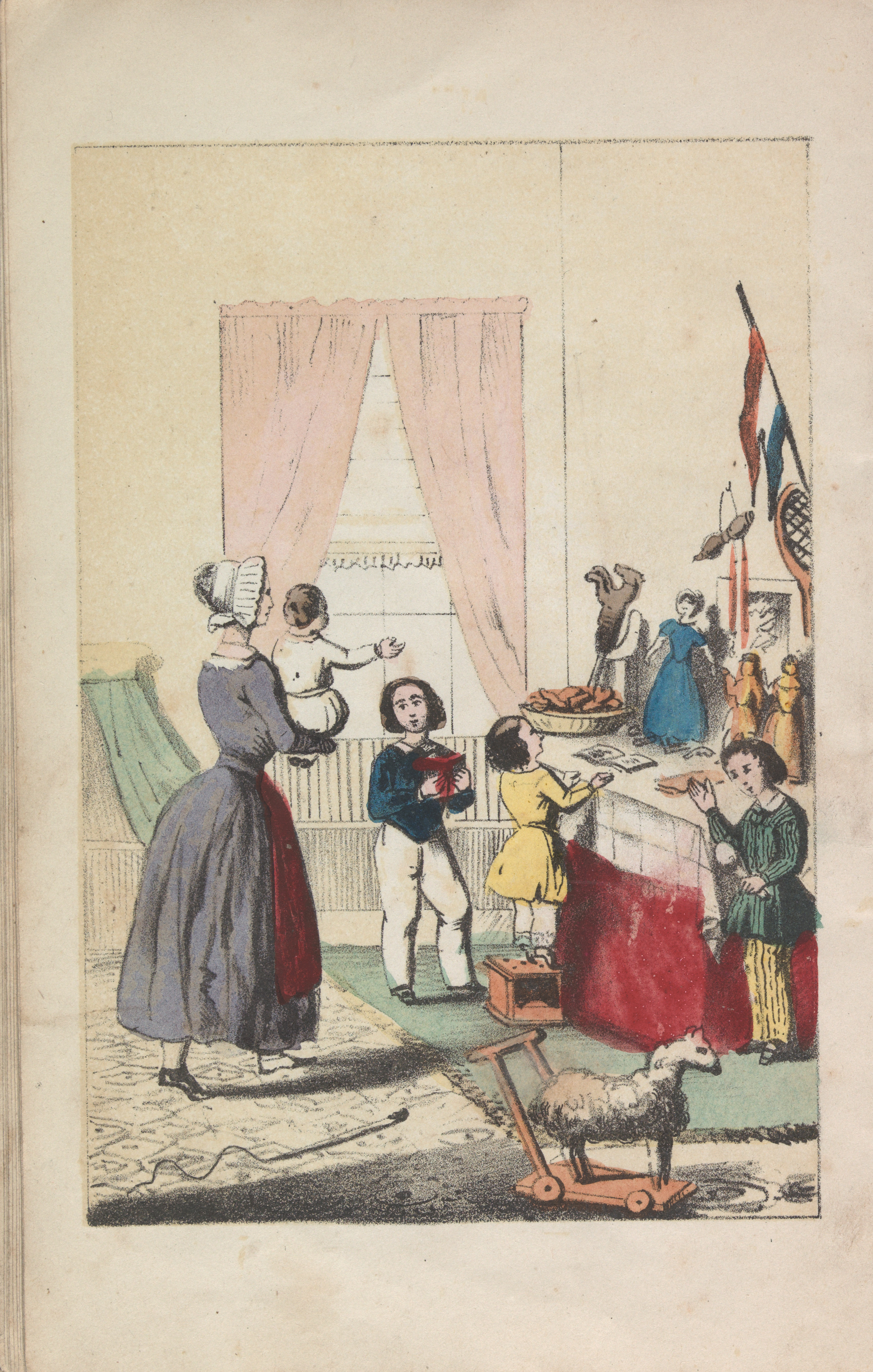
Children happy with the gifts from Sinterklaas

=== Sinterklaas keeps Book ===
Everything that Sinterklaas has heard, he writes down in his book. The book contains all the names of the children, and he writes next to each name whether that child has been good or naughty. Sinterklaas asks his servant a little later to prepare the bag with presents for the good children.

=== Sinterklaas on Scattering Evening ===
One evening, the children are suddenly surprised with lots of sweets. They just don't know where the sweets come from and who throws the sweets. Then Sinterklaas opens the door and the children know that Sinterklaas is visiting them.

=== Sinterklaas in the School ===
Sinterklaas visits a school and asks the teacher if the children are learning well. The teacher tells him that the children in his class are good students. Sinterklaas concludes his visit by telling the class that anyone who learns very well can receive a nice present.

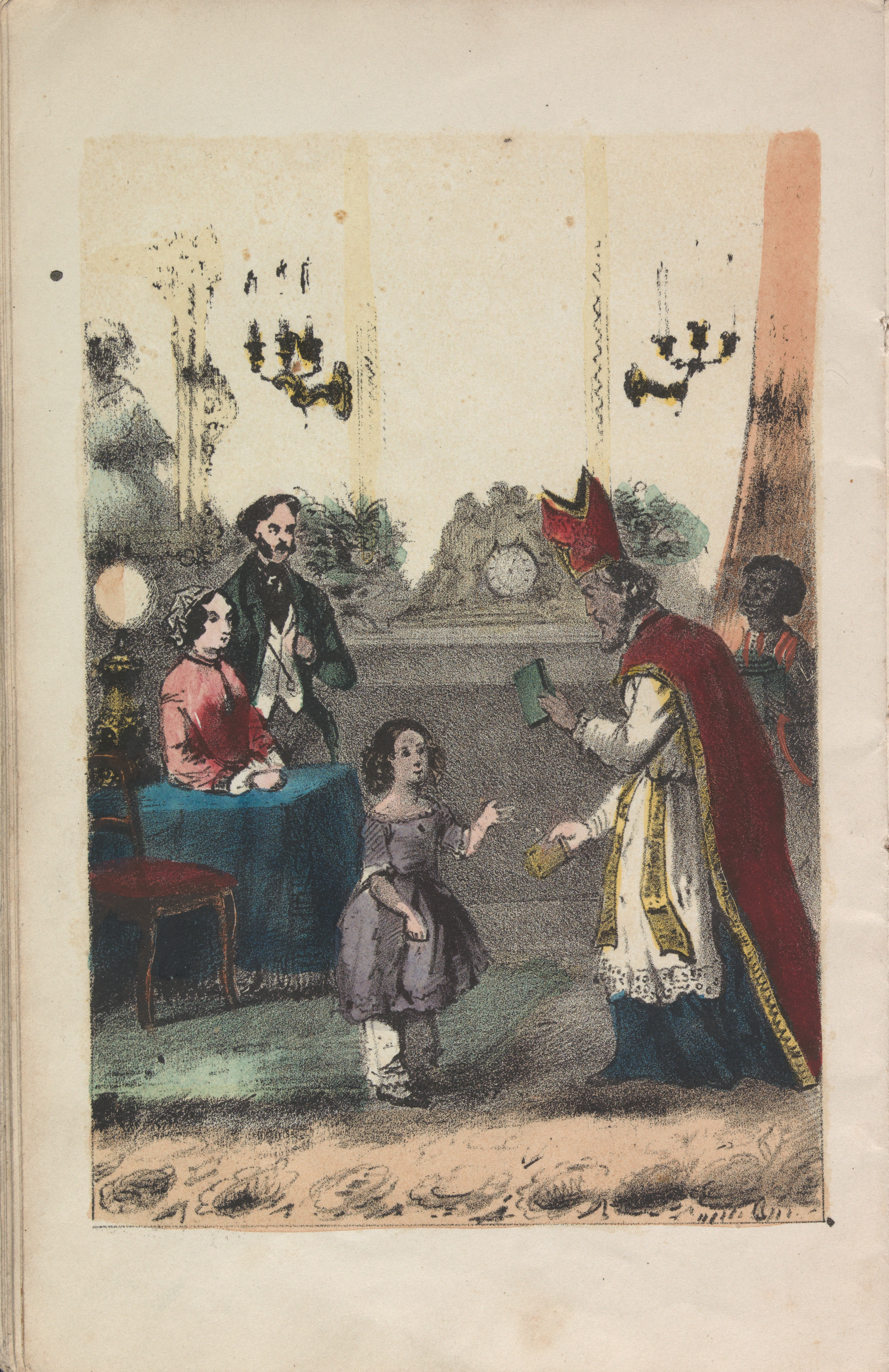
Sinterklaas visiting a rich child

=== Sinterklaas in the Children's Room ===
One day, the children are surprised with a table full of sweets. The children never expected to receive so many sweets from Sinterklaas. The children thanked Santa and wished that all children would be as happy as they were.

=== Sinterklaas at Grandma's ===
Sinterklaas not only gives presents to children, but also to adults. For example, grandma also receives a present from Sinterklaas. Her granddaughter is happy that she put her shoe at grandma's, because grandma received many presents. Her granddaughter then says that she will put her shoe at grandma's again next year.

=== Sinterklaas at a Rich Child ===
Sinterklaas visits a child who comes from a rich family. The child receives two picture books from Sinterklaas. Sinterklaas immediately adds that piety and virtue are more valuable than expensive presents and says that the child will be truly happy if she also brings some presents to the poor children.

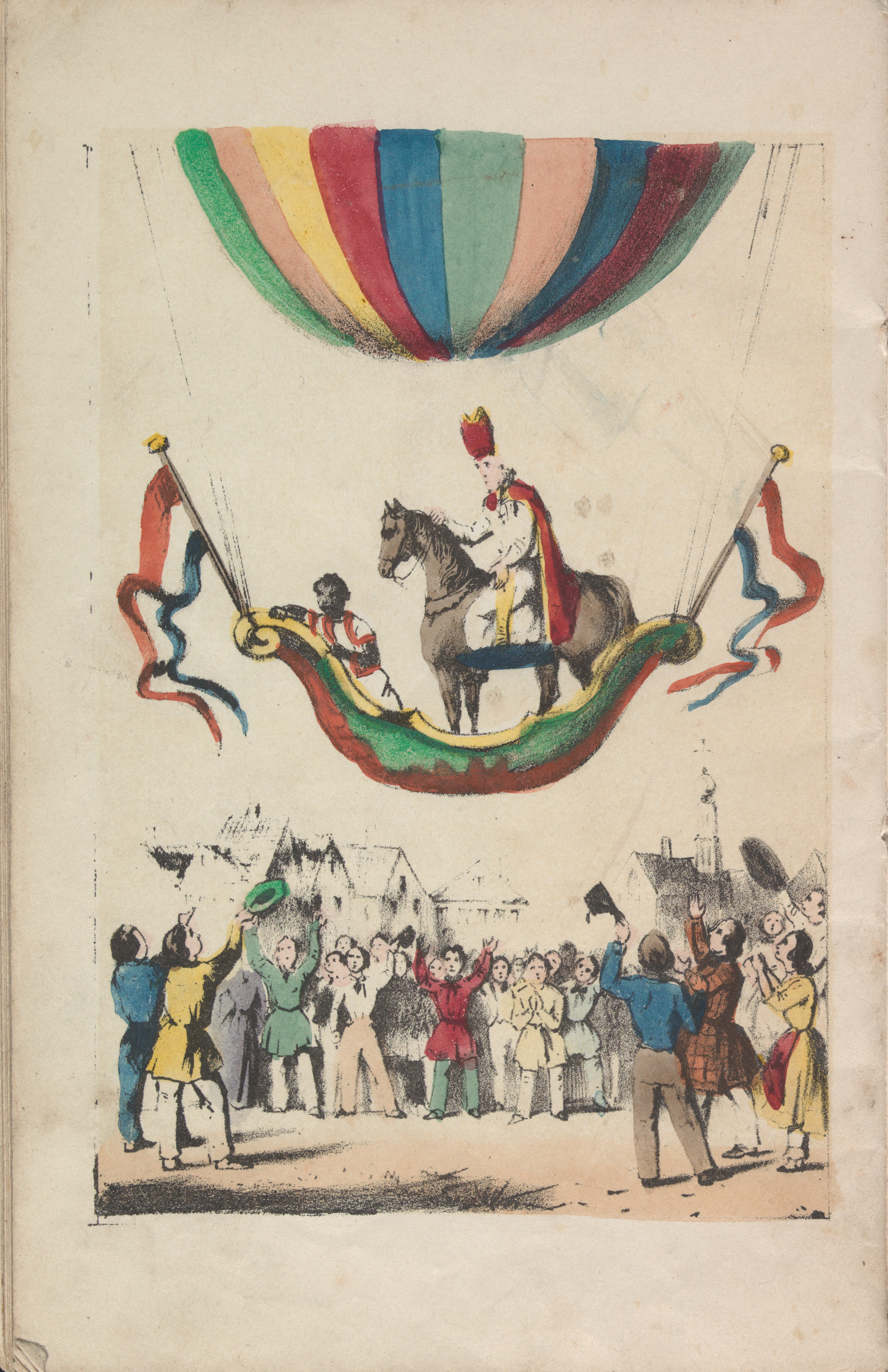
Sinterklaas leaves in a hot air balloon

=== Sinterklaas at a Sweet tooth ===
A little boy discovers that there is a tin full of cookies in the kitchen. He secretly goes into the kitchen and opens the tin. Just as he is about to eat a cookie, he is grabbed by his ear. It is Sinterklaas, who is not happy that the boy is eating sweets. The boy begs Sinterklaas not to punish him and promises to leave the tin of cookies.

=== Sinterklaas with a Poor Child ===
A poor child is sad that no one, except him, is getting any presents. The child thinks that Sinterklaas is driving past his house. Then the child suddenly sees a big present: a doll made of gingerbread. Sinterklaas does not forget any child, not even poor children.

=== Sinterklaas with Naughty Children ===
Sinterklaas does not like punishing children, but he thinks that naughty children should not get presents. He and his servant plan to put two naughty children in a sack, to take them to Spain afterwards. The parents beg Sinterklaas to let the children go and promise that they will not do naughty things any more.

=== Sinterklaas Departs ===
Sinterklaas has rewarded all the good children and punished all the naughty children. That is why he is returning to Spain, together with his horse and servant. He leaves the Netherlands in a hot air balloon and says goodbye to the children. He tells the children that they can count on him to return next year.

== Illustrations ==
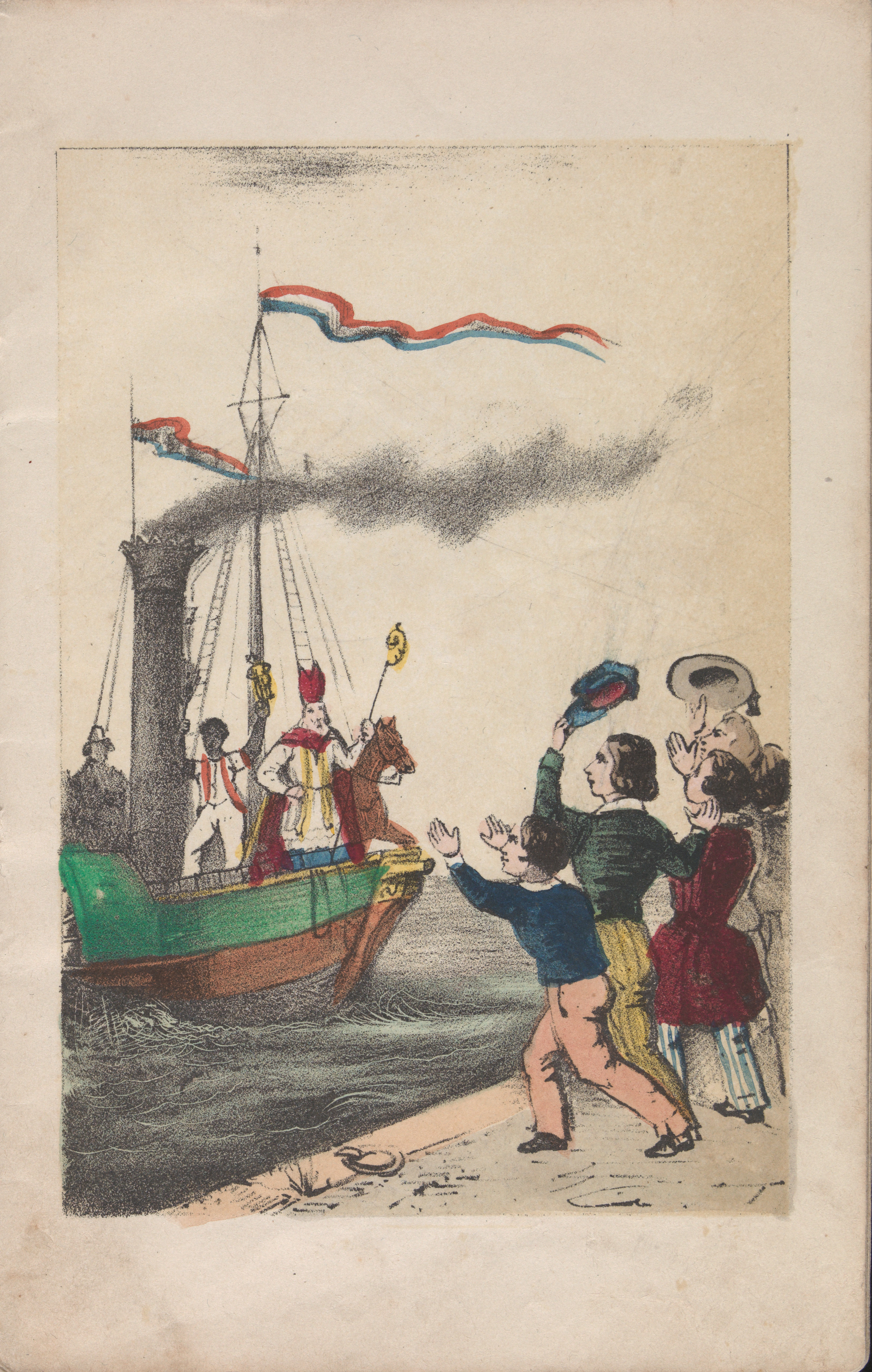
The arrival of Sinterklaas (1850)

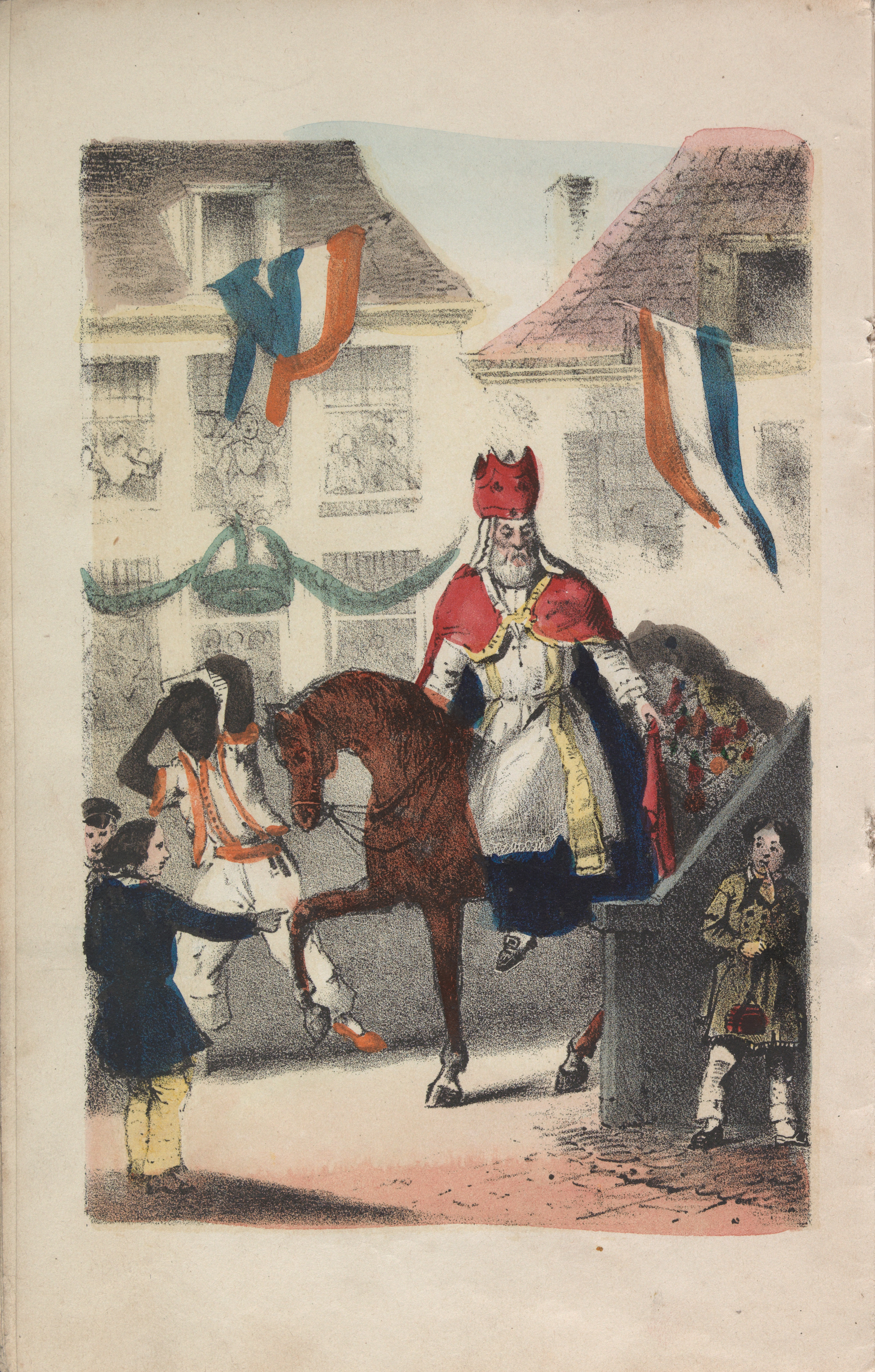
Sinterklaas discovers naughty Willem (1850)

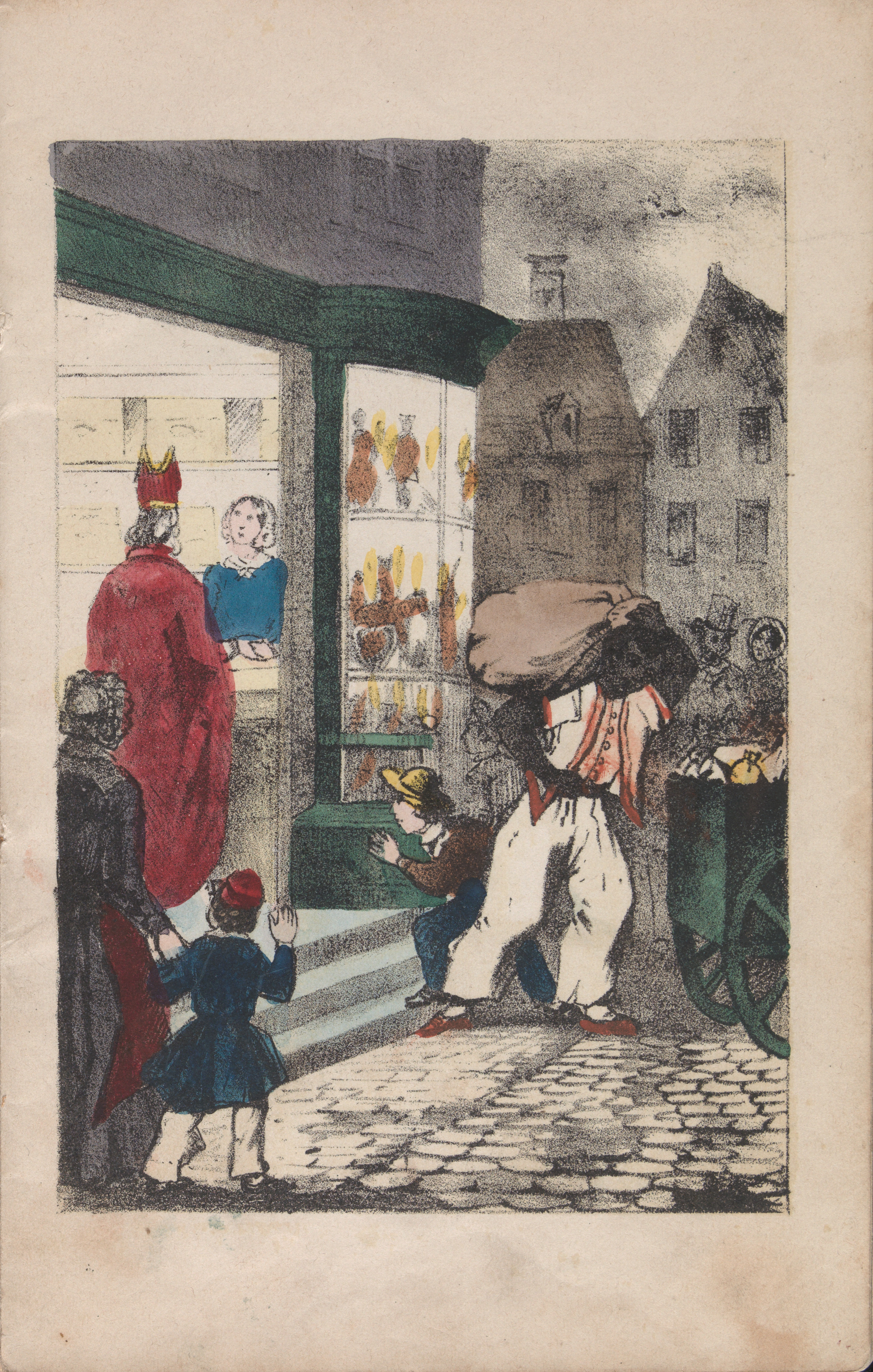
Sinterklaas at the pastry chef (1850)

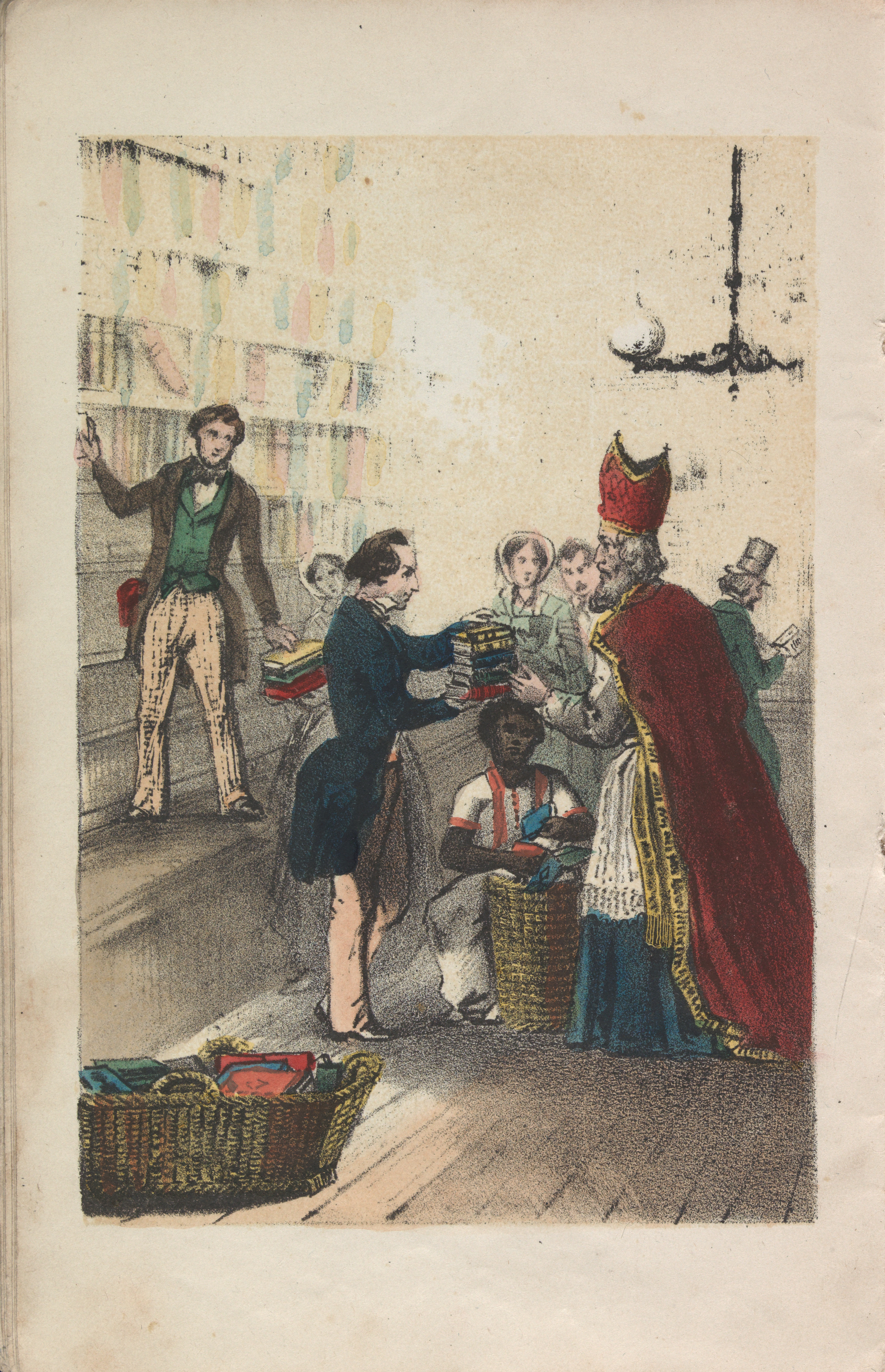
Sinterklaas in the bookshop (1850)

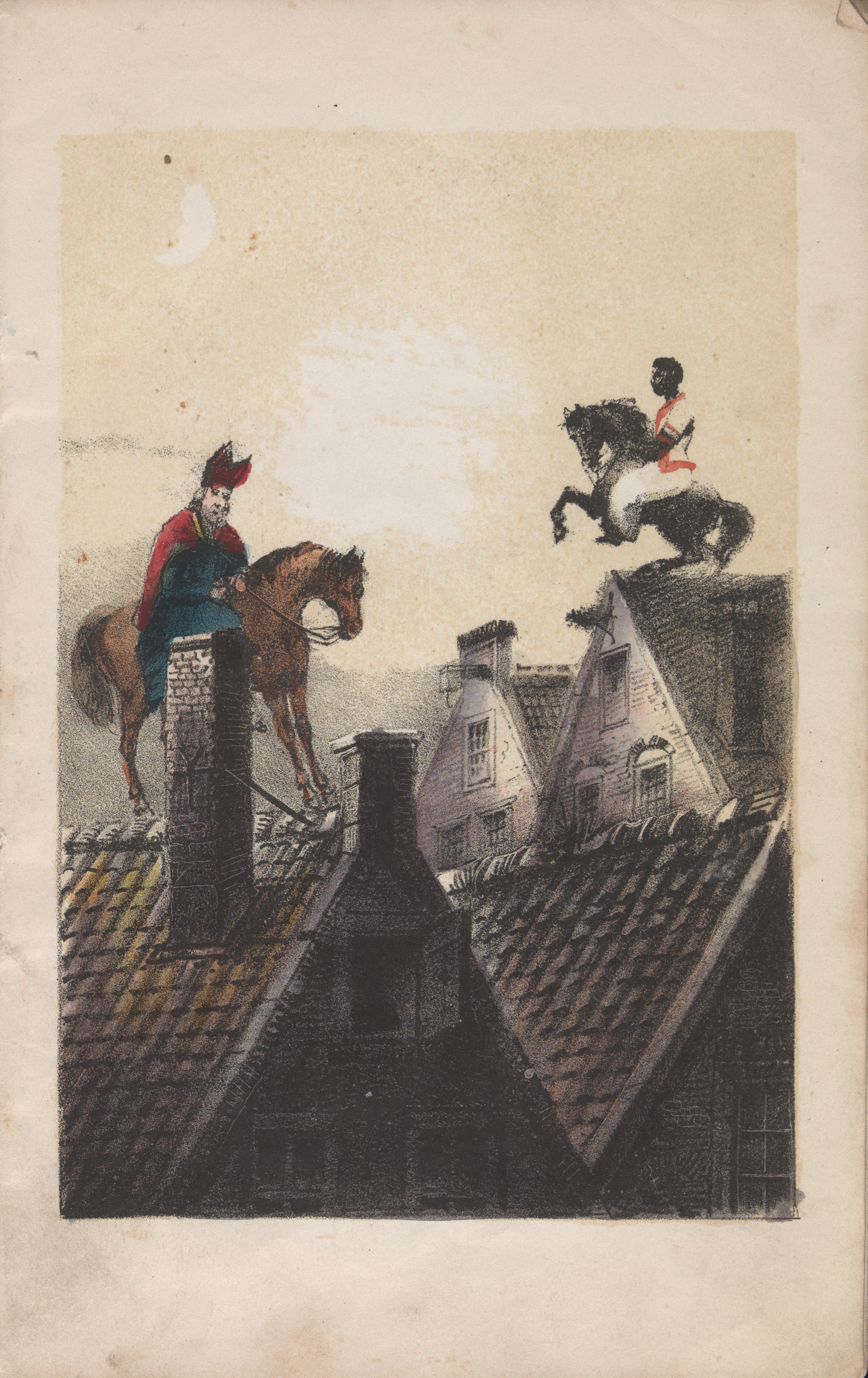
Sinterklaas and his servant on the roof (1850)

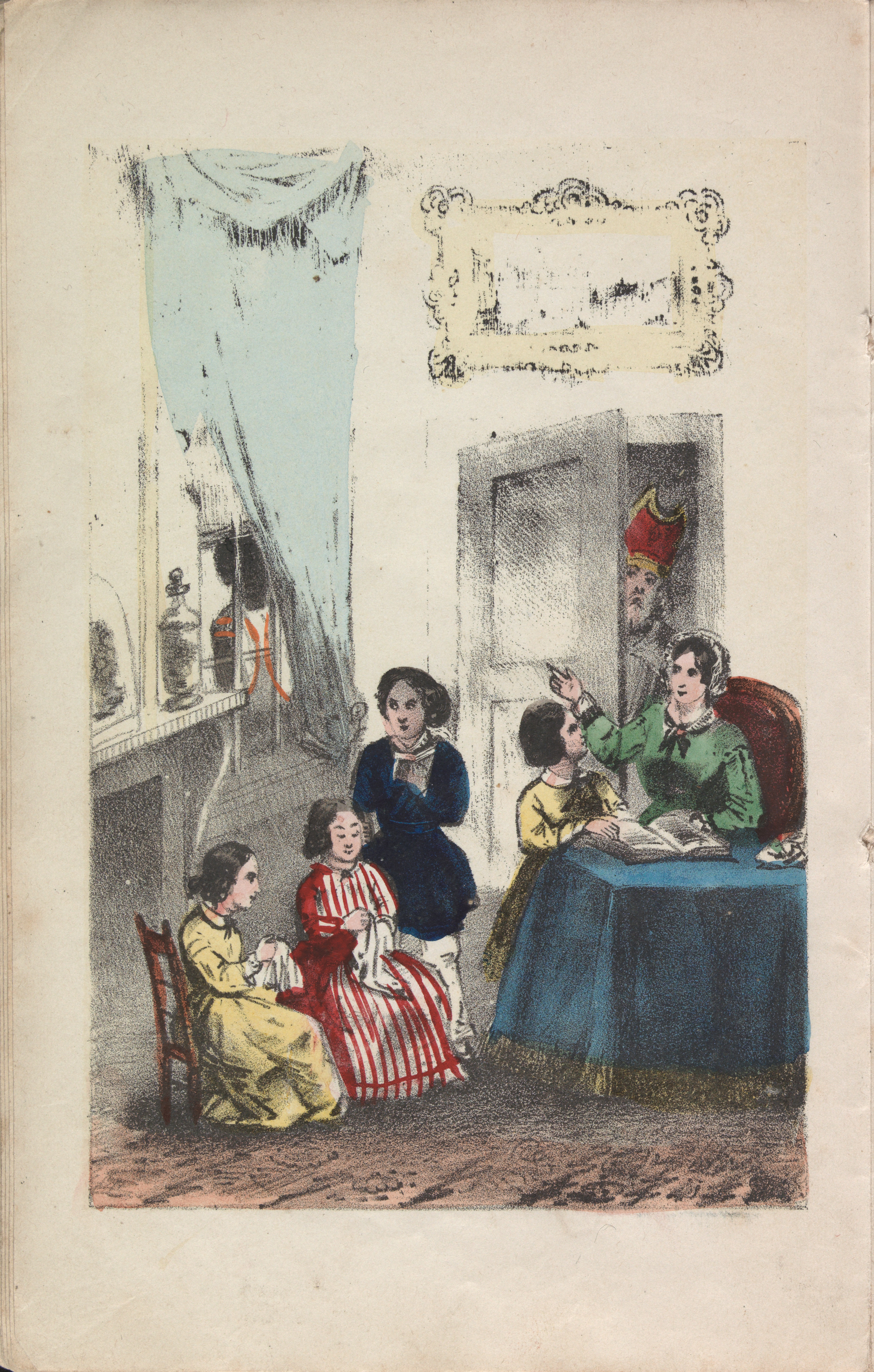
Sinterklaas and his servant eavesdrop in a room (1850)

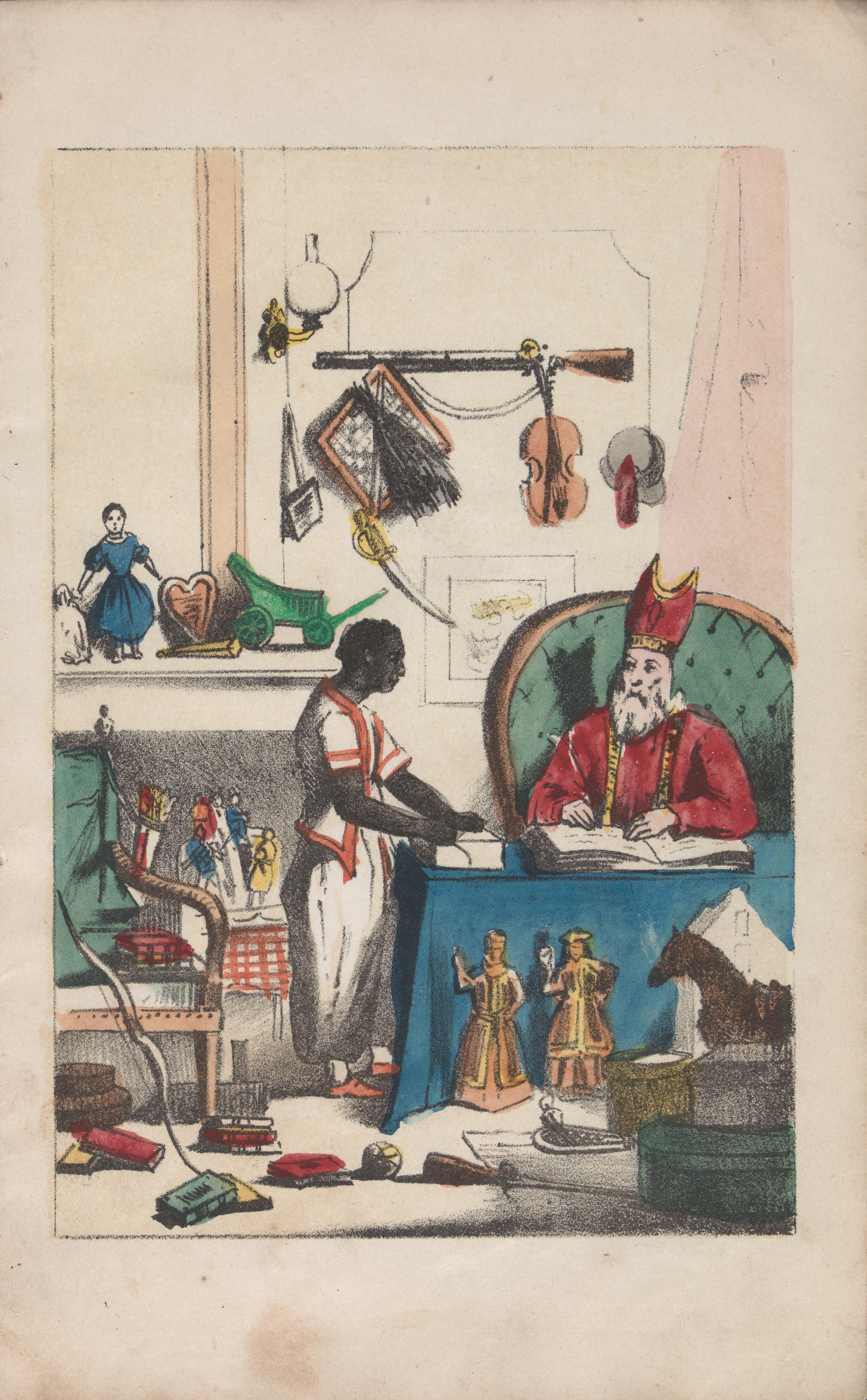
Sinterklaas and his servant (1850)

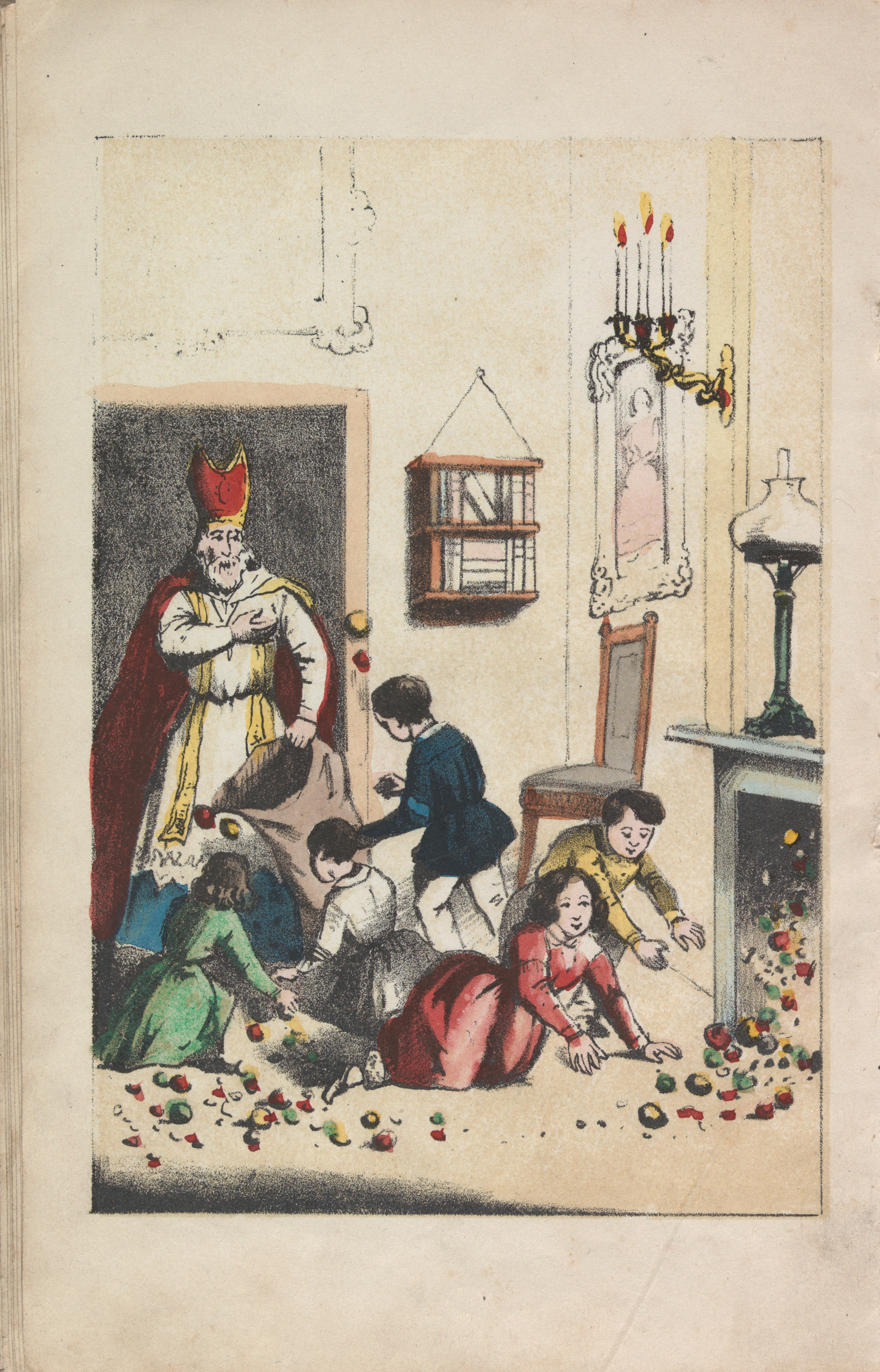
Sinterklaas throws candy to the children (1850)

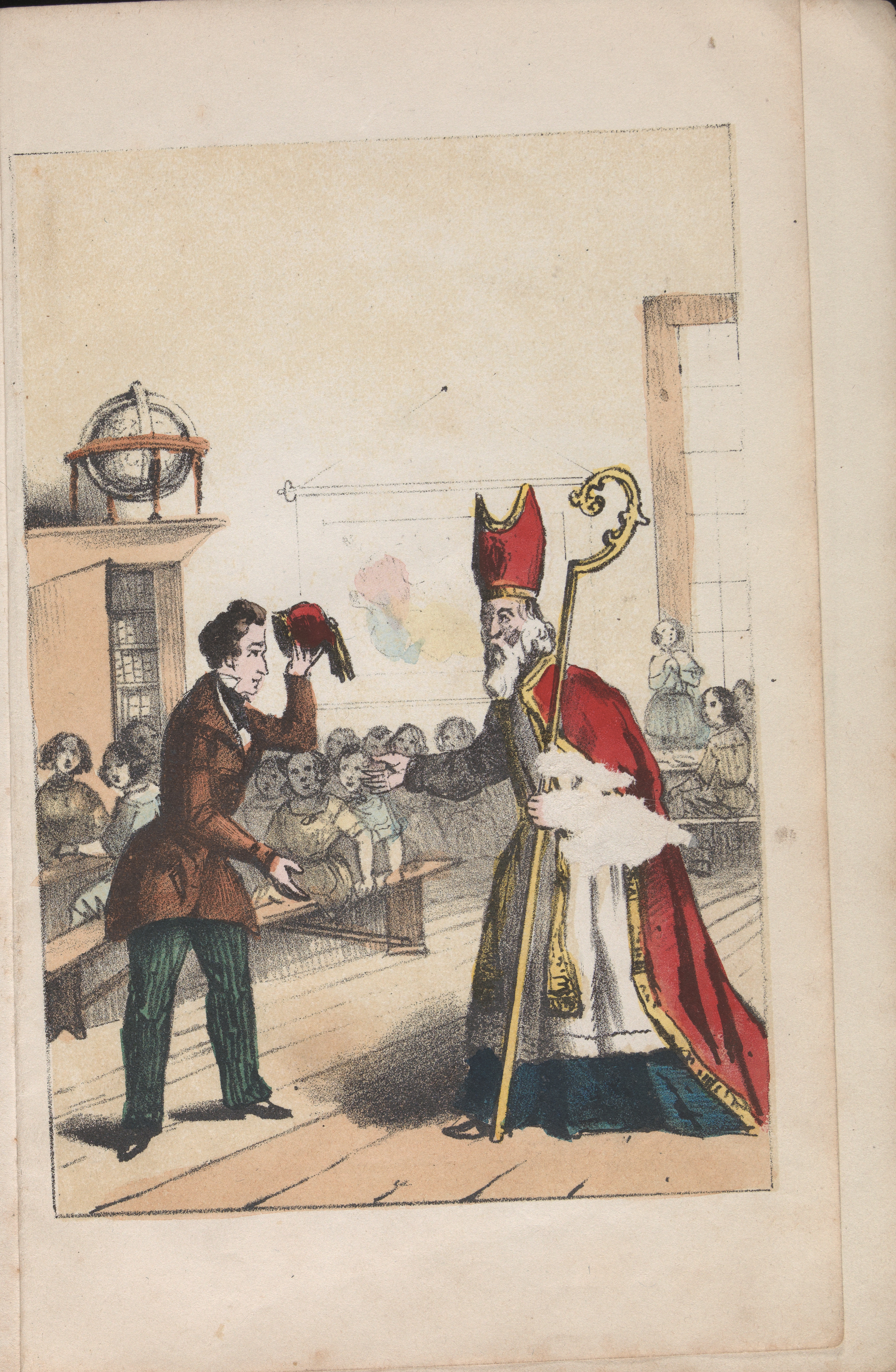
Sinterklaas visits a school (1850)

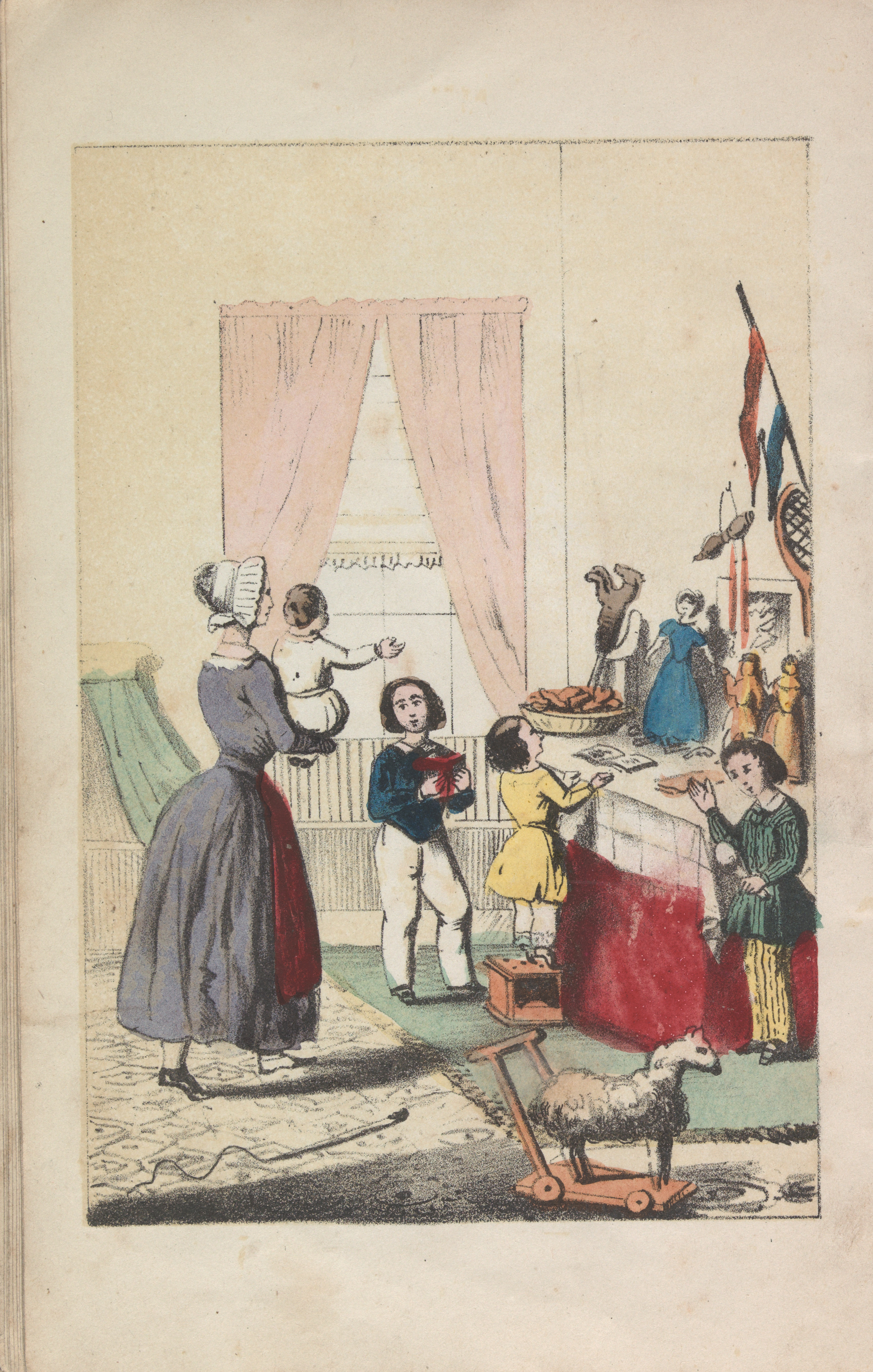
Children discover table full of sweets (1850)

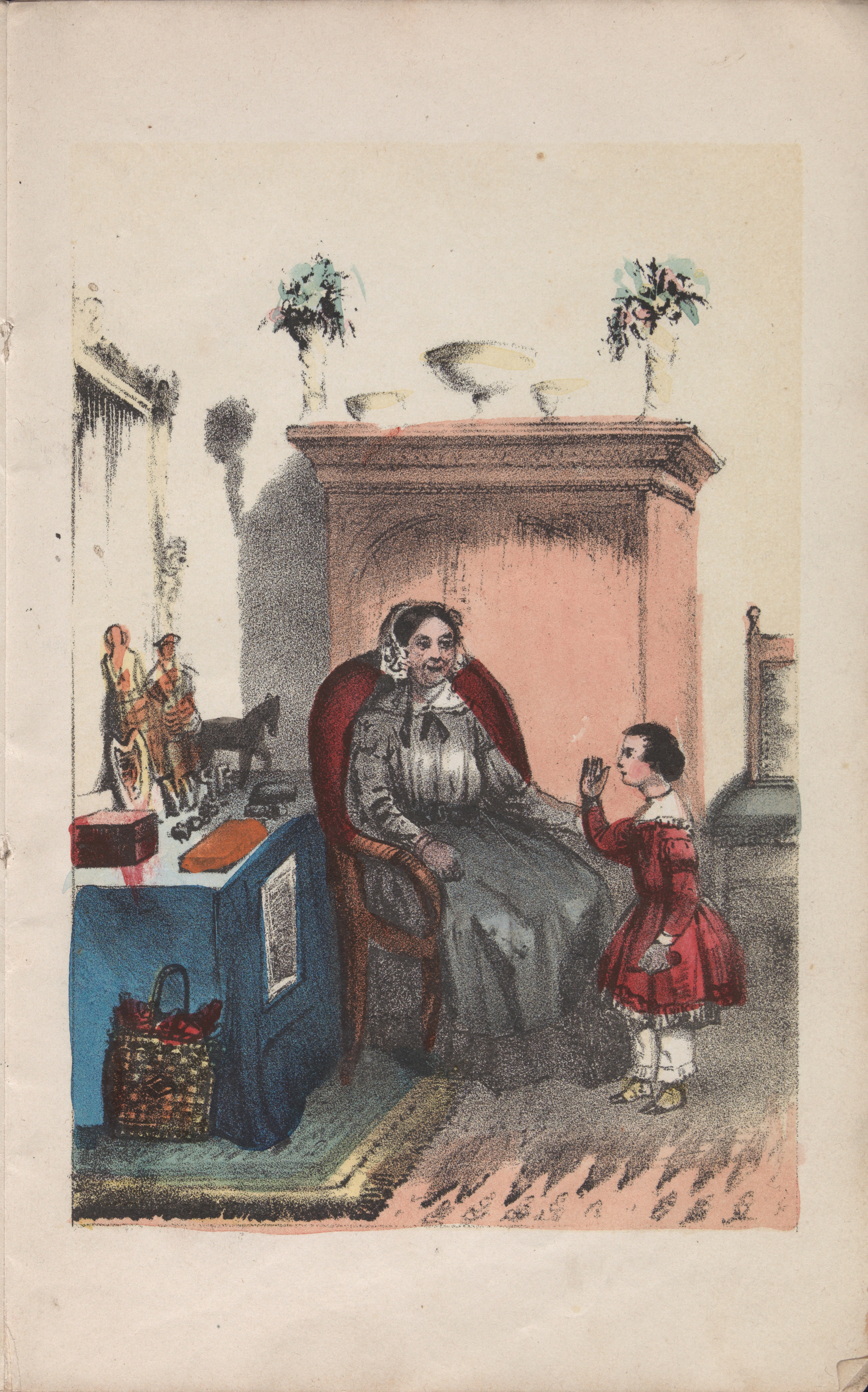
Grandmother and granddaughter receiving presents (1850)

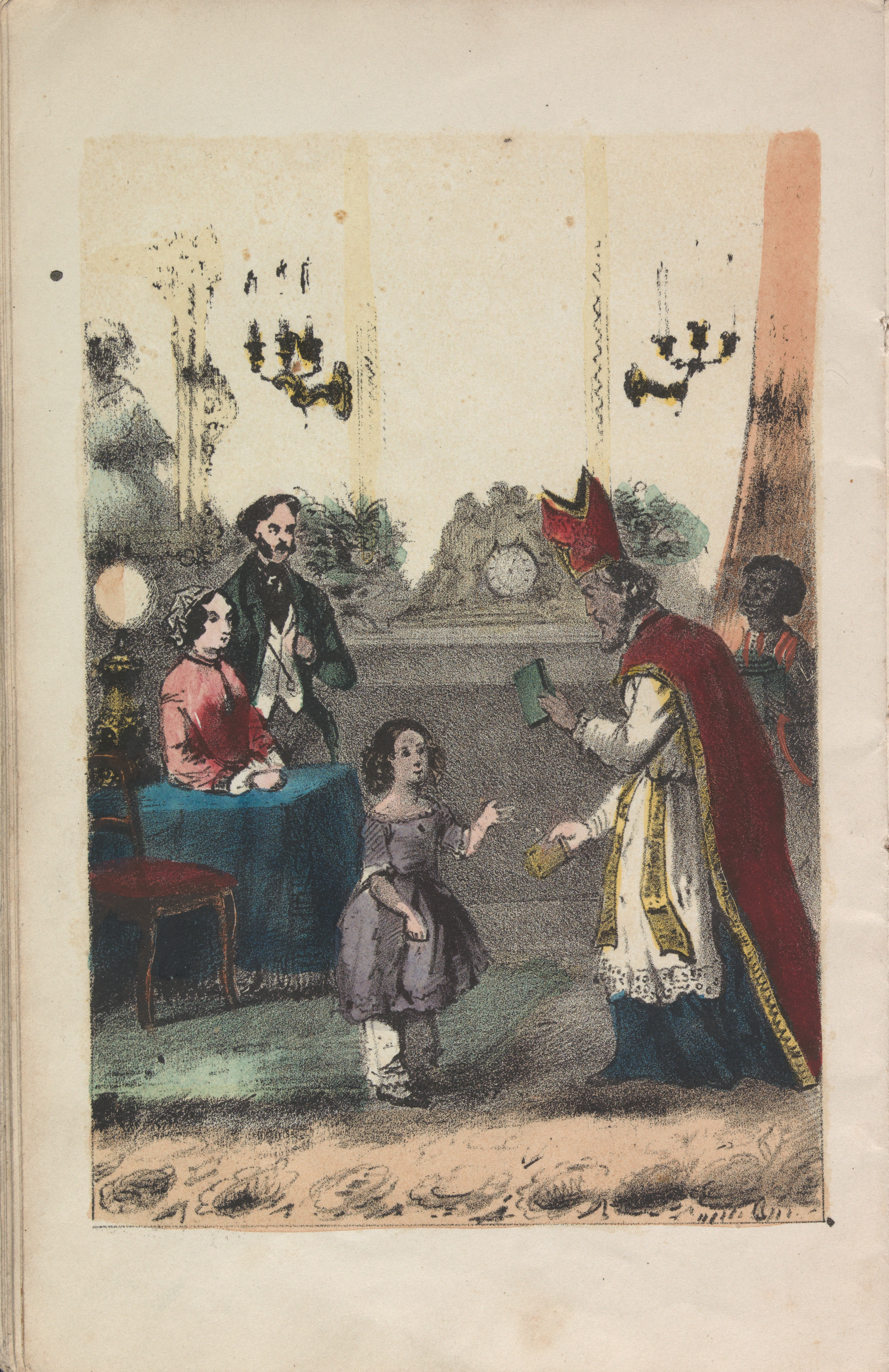
Sinterklaas visiting a rich child (1850)

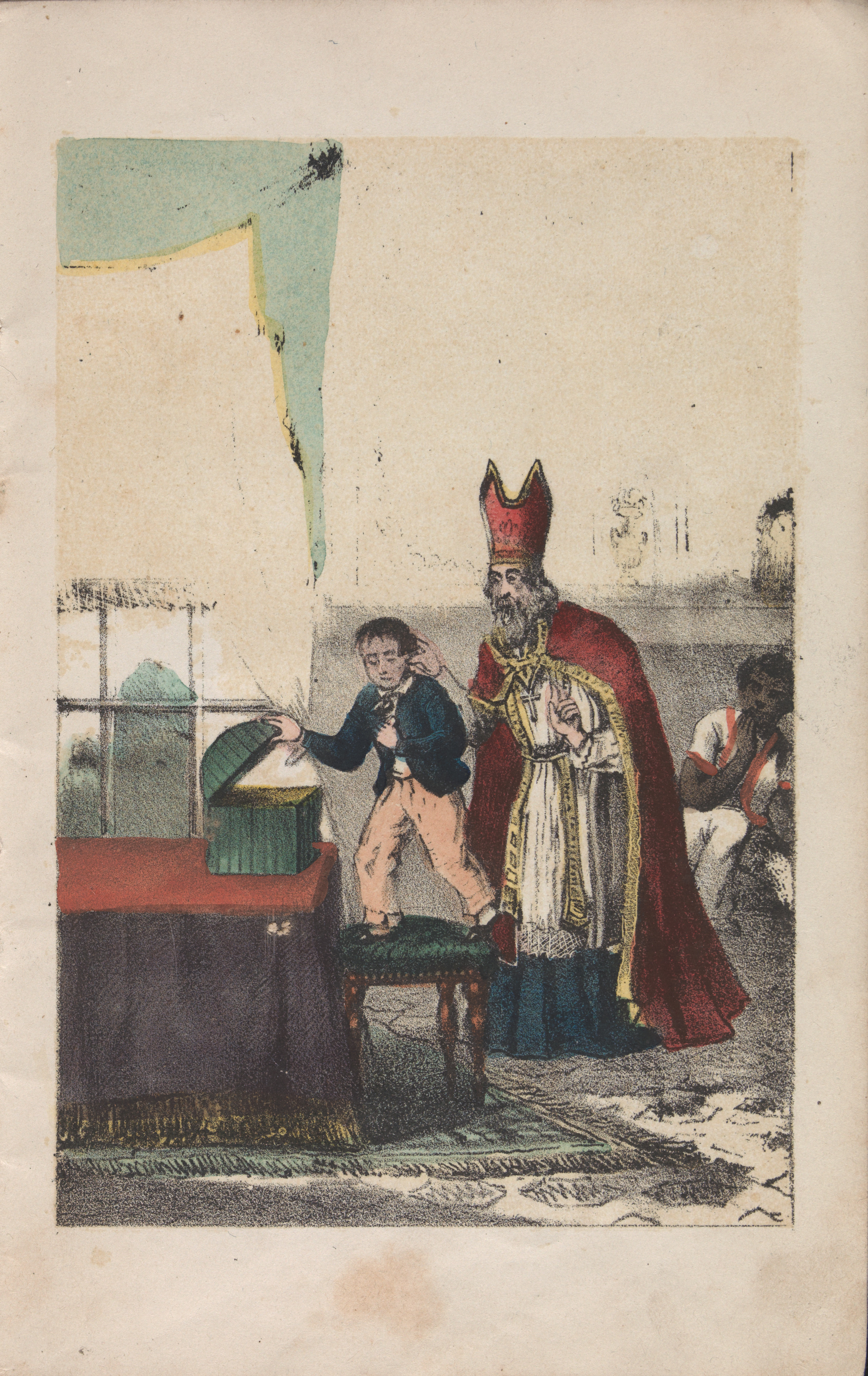
Sinterklaas catches a sweet tooth (1850)

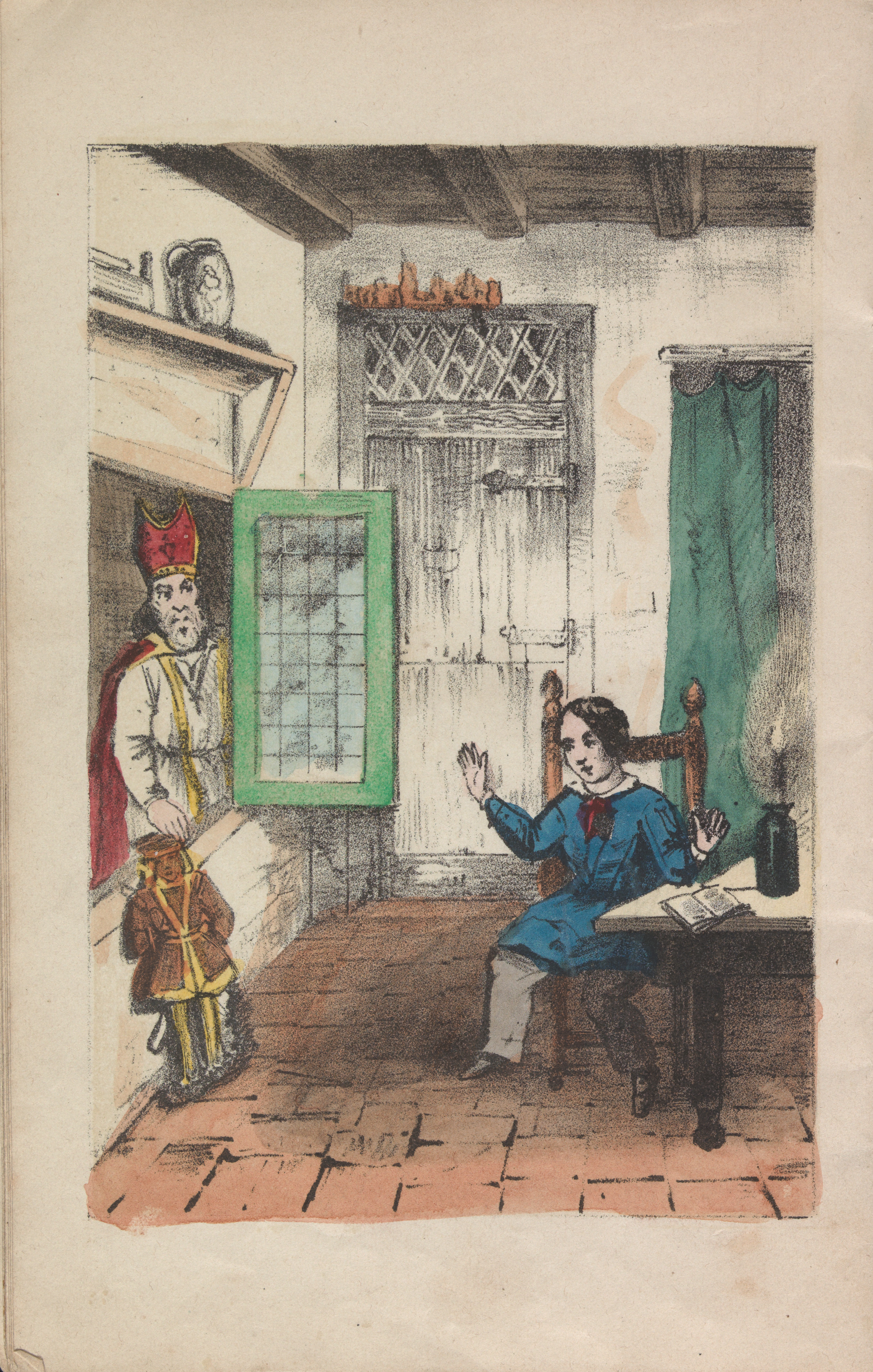
Sinterklaas brings present to poor child (1850)

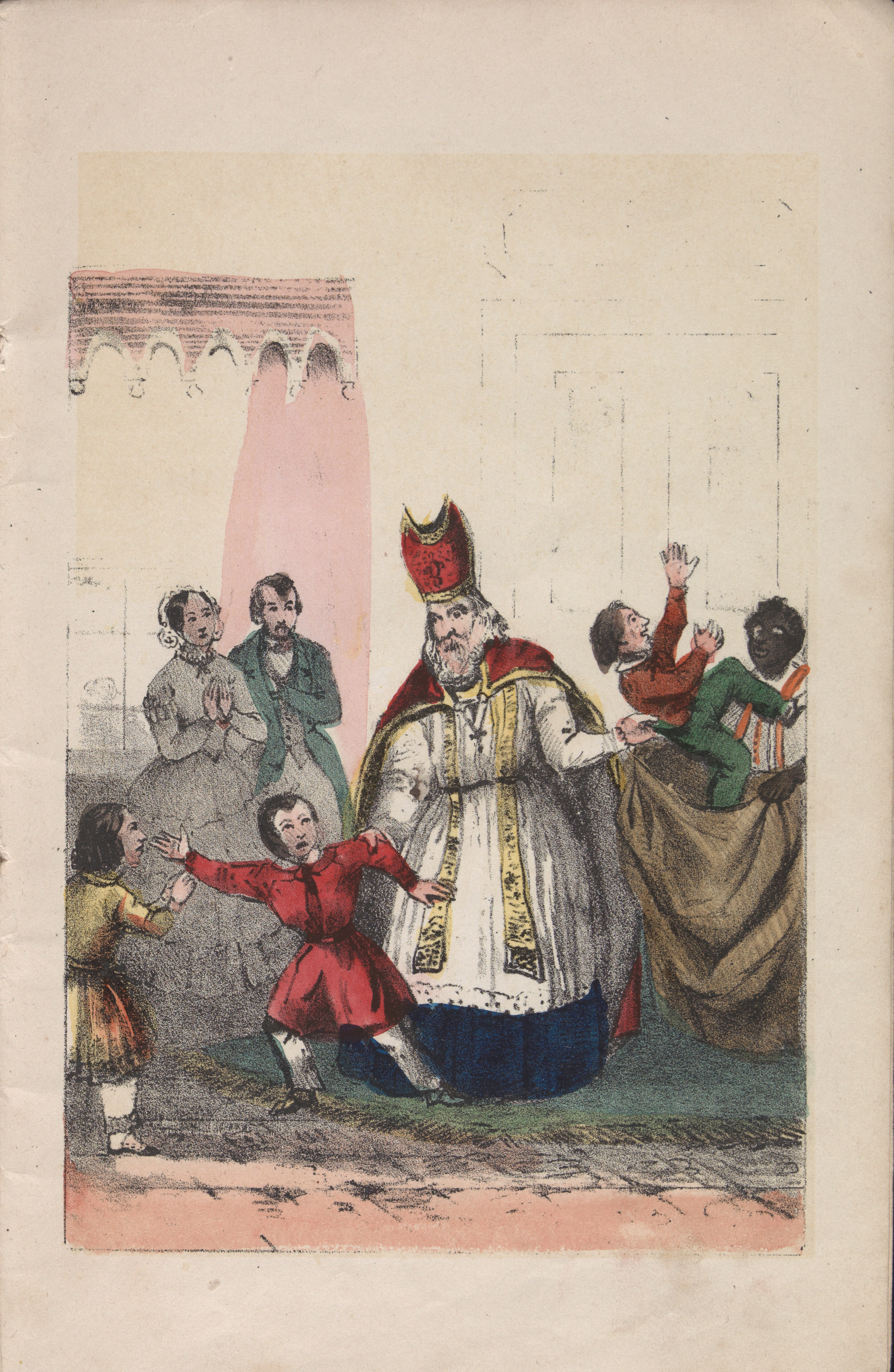
Sinterklaas and his servant punish naughty children (1850)

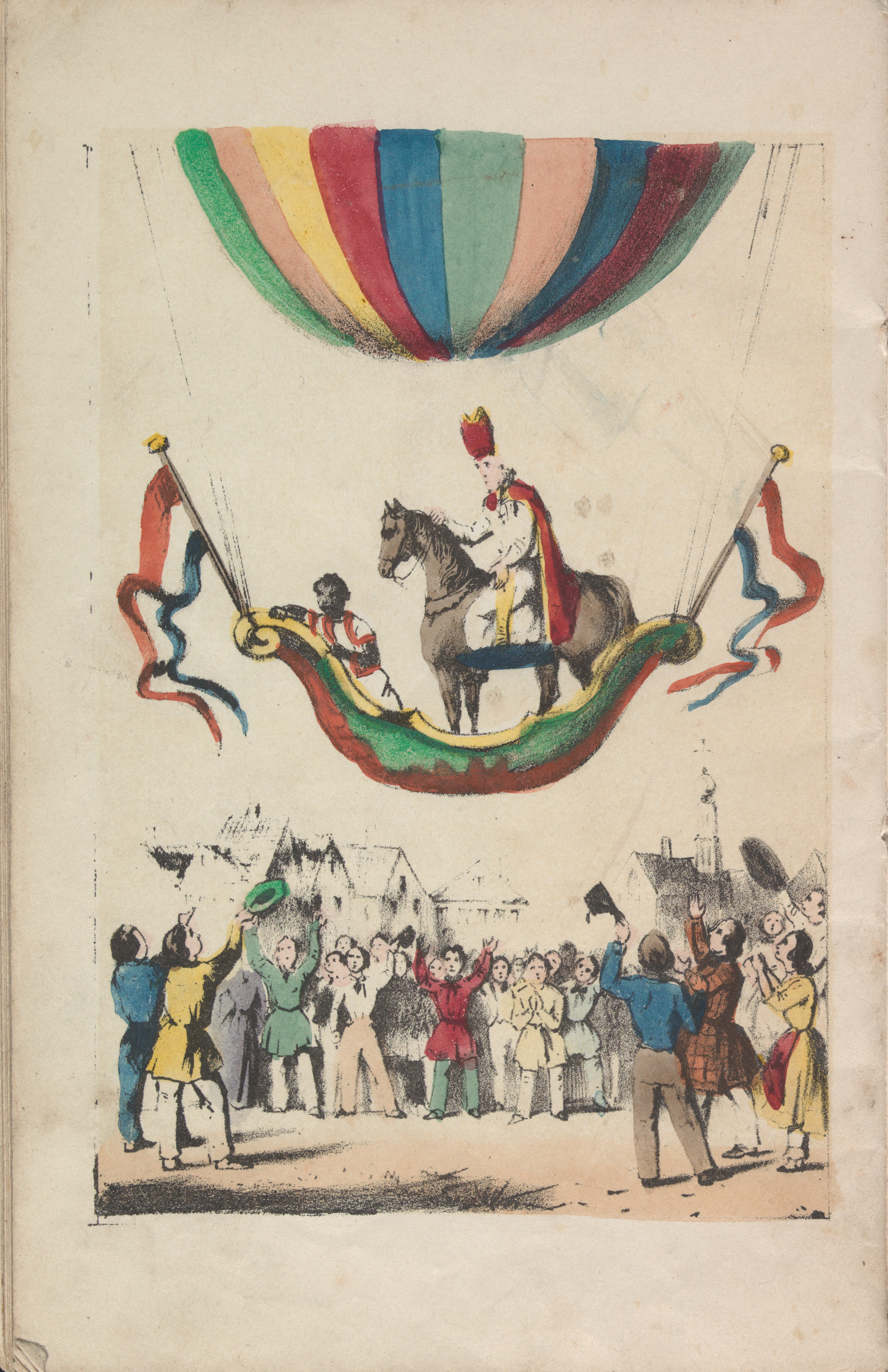
Sinterklaas and his servant leave in a hot air balloon (1850)

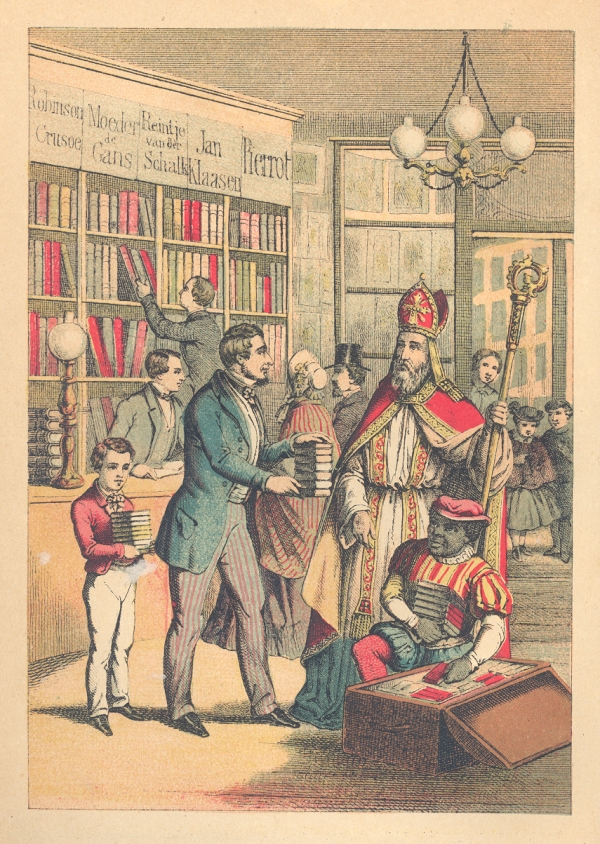
Sinterklaas in the bookshop (1880)

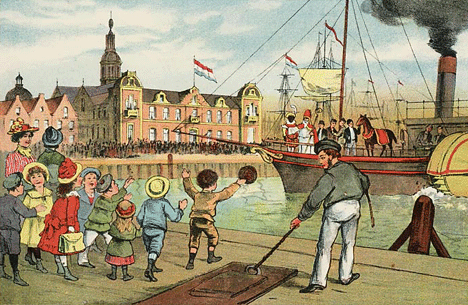
The arrival of Sinterklaas (1905)

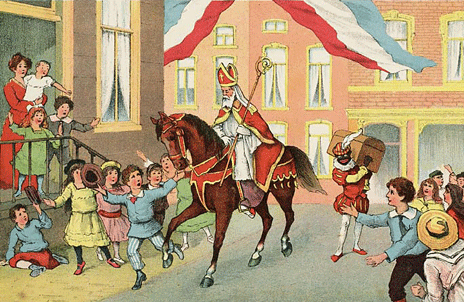
Sinterklaas discovers naughty Willem (1905)

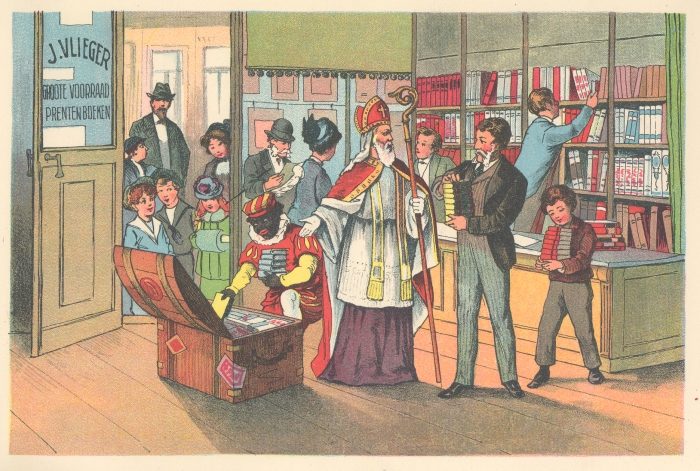
Sinterklaas in the bookshop (1905)

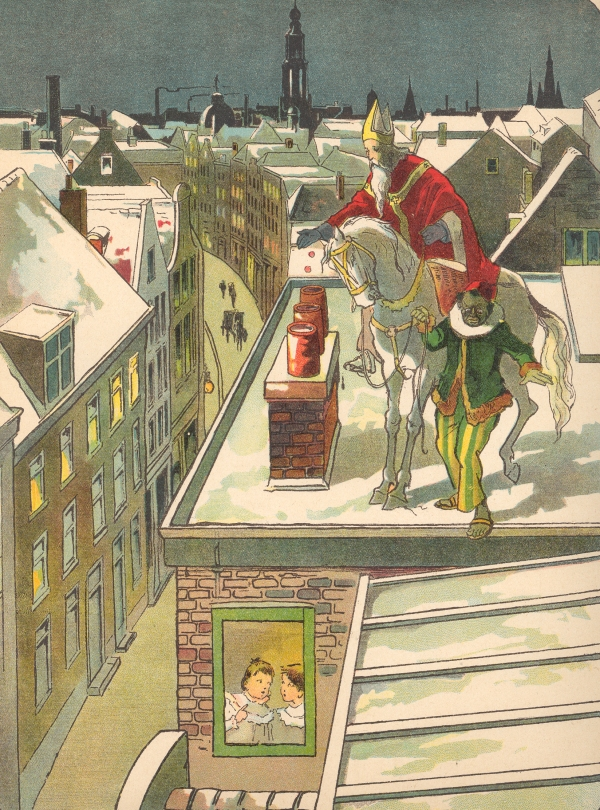
Sinterklaas and his servant on the roof (1907)

== Trivia ==
- The first poem about the arrival of Sinterklaas in the Netherlands was later set to music and has now become a well-known Sinterklaas song: Zie ginds komt de stoomboot.
- Various studies have shown that Jan Schenkman drew a lot of inspiration from another Sinterklaas book by a former colleague. It is not known how great his influence was on the picture book.
- In the first edition, Sinterklaas forgot to take his staff with him during his farewell.
- In later editions, the part about Sinterklaas leaving in a hot air balloon was removed. Since the second edition, Sinterklaas and his servant leave with the steam locomotive De Arend.

== See also ==
- Sinterklaas
- Zwarte Piet
- Saint Nicholas
- Saint Nicholas Day
