= Desmond Smith (Canadian Army officer) =

Canadian general

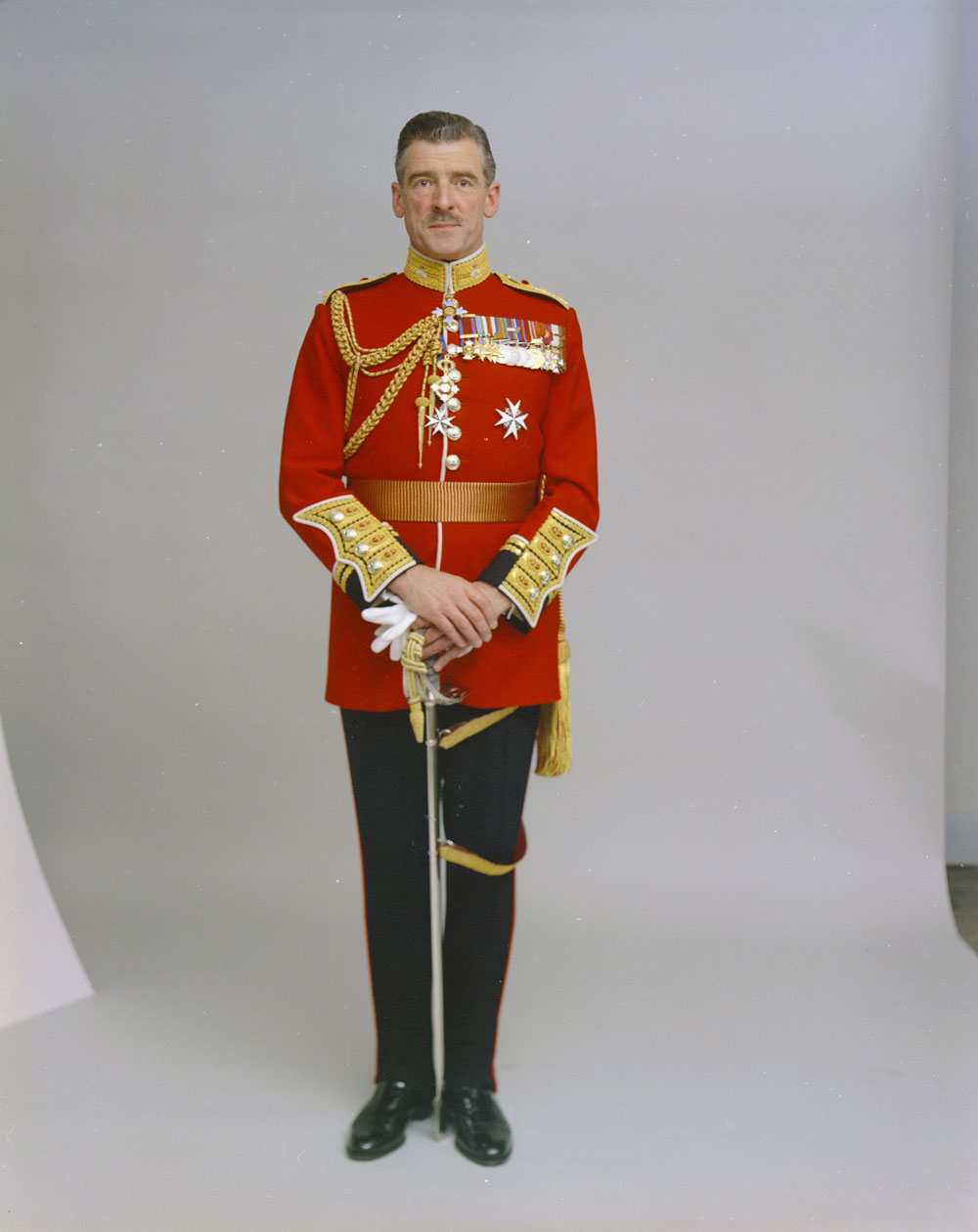
- Born: James Desmond Blaise Smith; 2 October 1911; Ottawa, Ontario, Canada
- Died: 11 October 1991 (aged 80); London, England
- Burial place: Beechwood Cemetery, Ottawa, Ontario, Canada; 45.4472°N 75.6625°W
- Military career
- Allegiance: Canada
- Branch: Canadian Army
- Service years: 1933–1962
- Rank: Major-General
- Nickname: "Des"
- Unit: The Royal Canadian Dragoons
- Commands: 5th Canadian Armoured Brigade; 1st Canadian Infantry Division; Royal Military College of Canada
- Conflicts: World War II: Italian Campaign; Northwest Europe
- Awards: CBE, DSO, KStJ, CD

Major-General James Desmond Blaise "Des" Smith, CBE, DSO, KStJ, CD (2 October 1911 – 11 October 1991) was a senior Canadian Army officer active in World War II, fighting in the Italian Campaign and Northwest Europe.

== Early life and military career ==
Smith was born in Ottawa, Ontario on 2 October 1911. He studied at the Royal Military College of Canada and graduated in 1933. On graduation he was promoted to lieutenant and attached to the Royal Canadian Dragoons. He served in the infantry, and was called overseas in 1940 as a staff officer with the 1st Canadian Infantry Division, then stationed in the United Kingdom. He became a brigadier in 1943 and commanded the 5th Canadian Armoured Brigade in both the Italian and Northwest Europe Campaigns. He returned to Canada in 1945, and took over command of the Royal Military College. During the 1950s, he commanded Canadian forces in Europe as part of NATO. He retired in 1962, to start work in the private sector, eventually moving to England. He retired in 1986, and died in London a few days after his 80th birthday in 1991.

== World War II ==
Captain Smith's World War II overseas service began when the Royal Canadian Dragoons were sent to England, as part of the 1st Canadian Infantry Division. Smith earned his promotion from captain to major due to breaking the rules. He was ordered to get winter gear for troops that would be deployed in Norway. Finding nothing suitable, he just ordered proper gear from a company named Lilywhite's. Smith was summoned to appear before Major-General McNaughton because of the unauthorised expense; but instead of having to pay personally for the bill, he received a promotion. He ended his wartime career as Brigadier of the 1st Canadian Infantry Brigade.

== Post-war military career ==
Between 1945 and his military retirement in 1962, Smith held several positions in Canada and the United Kingdom. His first peace time job was at his alma mater the Royal Military College. He commanded the college till 1947. In the period 1958–1962, Smith was Adjutant-General of the Canadian Army in Ottawa. In the meantime he held, amongst others, the position as chairman of the Canadian Joint Staff with the NATO. He was forced to leave the Army on Prime Minister John Diefenbaker's instance, due to an extra-marital affair that became public knowledge.

== Post-war civil career ==
Smith moved to England in 1962. After several minor jobs he joined Pillar Holdings in 1964. He was responsible for the engineering branch of that company: Pillar Engineering Limited. In 1986 he retired from his civil job, only to be appointed as the first Canadian member of the Commonwealth War Graves Commission.

== Personal ==
Smith was married twice, first Miriam Blackburn, until her death in 1969, and then to Belle Shenkman, a member of the Order of Canada. He had two sons from his first marriage, James and Stephen George Smith. He died in a hospital in London, England on 11 October 1991. There was first a memorial in London, and then a state funeral in Canada's capital city, Ottawa.

== Senior military positions held ==
From	To	Unit	Role	Rank
12 September 1940	25 November 1940	1 Canadian Infantry Division	General staff Officer 2	Major
18 May 1941	12 February 1942	2 Canadian Armoured Brigade	Brigade Major	Major
13 February 1942	28 June 1942	1 Armoured Car Regiment	Commanding Officer	Lieutenant-Colonel
29 June 1942	5 May 1943	5 Canadian Armoured Division	General staff Officer 1	Lieutenant-Colonel
6 May 1943	22 February 1944	4 Canadian Armoured Brigade	Officer Commanding	Brigadier
23 February 1944	6 June 1944	5 Canadian Armoured Brigade	Officer Commanding	Brigadier
7 June 1944	11 November 1944	I Canadian Corps	Brigadier General Staff	Brigadier
12 November 1944	5 December 1944	1 Canadian Infantry Division	Acting General Officer Commanding	Brigadier
9 December 1944	6 May 1945	1 Canadian Infantry Brigade	Officer Commanding	Brigadier
7 June 1945	15 August 1945	?	Comandant of a brigade training for the war with Japan	Brigadier
1945	1946	Royal Military College	Commandant	Brigadier
1946	?	Government	Military Secretary to the Cabinet Defence Committee	Brigadier
?	1951	Canadian Army	Quartermaster general	Major General
1951	August 1954	Canadian Joint Staff in London	chairman of the Canadian Joint Staff in London, and Canadian National Military Representative to SHAPE	Major General
August 1954	1958	National Defence College	Commandant	Major General
1958	1962	Canadian Army Headquarter	Adjutant-general of the Canadian Army	Major General
30 November 1961	1962	The Canadian Guards	Colonel, The Canadian Guards	Major General

Academic offices
Preceded by Sir John Whiteley	Commandant of the Royal Military College of Canada; 1945–1946	Succeeded by Douglas Cunningham
