= Shankman =

Shankman is a surname. Notable people with the surname include:

- Adam Shankman (born 1964), American film director, producer, writer, dancer, author, actor, and choreographer
- Peter Shankman (born 1972), American entrepreneur and author
- Sarah Shankman, American mystery writer
