= Belle Shenkman =

- Born: Belle Gubler; June 24, 1928; Kiev, Ukrainian SSR, USSR
- Died: March 11, 1995 (aged 66); London, England
- Occupations: Arts patron and fundraiser
- Spouse(s): Harold Shenkman; Desmond Smith
- Children: 1 son, 1 daughter

Belle Shenkman, CM (June 24, 1928 – March 11, 1995) was a Ukrainian-born, London-based Canadian arts patron and fundraiser.

== Early life ==
Belle Shenkman was born as Bell Gubler was born on June 24, 1928, in Kiev, now the capital of Ukraine. She emigrated to Canada with her parents when she was three months old.

== Career ==
Shenkman organized the first European performance by the National Ballet of Canada, held at the London Coliseum in 1972. She became a member of the Order of Canada in 1979.

Shenkman raised £30,000 for the Royal Winnipeg Ballet in 1982. As a result, it performed at Sadler's Wells in London.

== Personal life, death and legacy ==
Shenkman, then Gubler, married Harold Shenkman in 1948. They had a son, William, and a daughter, Dasha, and later divorced. She married Major General Desmond Smith in 1979; he died in 1991.

Shenkman died on March 11, 1995, in London. The Belle Shenkman Room at the Royal Academy of Arts is named in her memory.
