= Jan Schenkman =

Dutch teacher and poet (1806–1863)

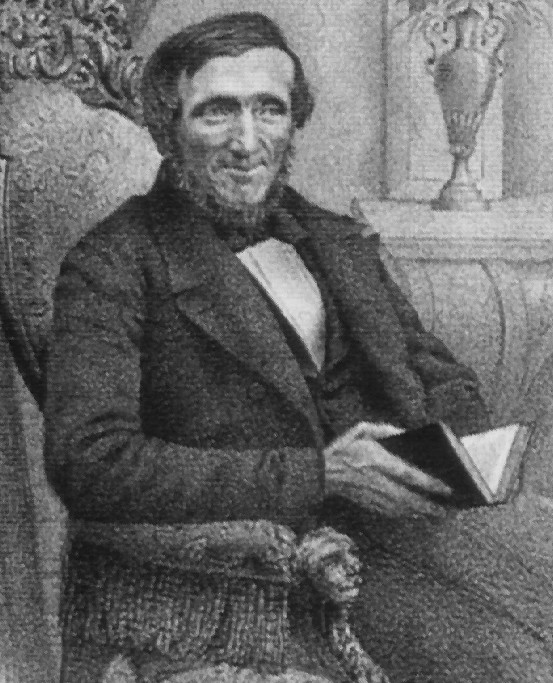
- Born: 1 October 1806; Amsterdam, Kingdom of Holland
- Died: 4 May 1863 (aged 56); Amsterdam, Kingdom of the Netherlands

Jan Schenkman (born 1 October 1806 in Amsterdam, Netherlands - died 4 May 1863 in Amsterdam, Netherlands) was a Dutch teacher, poet, and author of books for children. He is best remembered for writing several traditional songs sung during the Sinterklaas holidays. He also wrote the book Saint Nicholas and his Servant (1850).
