= December 23 =

December 23 this year in various calendars
- Wednesday, 23 December 2026
Akan	Kwawukuo
Armenian	6 Arach 1476
Aztec	Huei Tozoztli 2, 10 Cuāuhtli
Babylonian	13 Kislimu, 2337 SE
Balinese pawukon	Luang, Pepet, Beteng, Sri, Wage, Was, Buda of Warigadian, Ludra, Ogan, Pati
Bengali	8 Poush, BS 1433
Chinese	Yin Metal Goat・Wall Mansion; Fire Horse Year, Month 11, Day 15 (Dongzhi, 13 days until Xiaohan)
Common Era	23 December 2026 CE
Coptic	14 Koiak, AM 1743
Egyptian	11 Pachon, 2775 NE
Ethiopian	14 Tākḫśāś, 2019 Amätä Məhrät
French Republican	Décade I, Duodi de Nivôse de l'Année 235 de la République
Gregorian	23 December, AD 2026
Hebrew	13 Tevet, AM 5787
Hindu	Rohiṇi・Śubha; Solar: 8 Pauṣa, 1948 SE; Lunisolar: Caturdaśī, Śukla pakṣa of Mārgaśīrṣa, 2083 VE; Rāudra・5127 KY・1,872,932
Icelandic	Miðvikudagur, 1 Mörsugur 2026
Islamic	13 Rajab, AH 1448 (using tabular method)
ISO week date	2026-W52-3
Japanese	15 Shimotsuki, Reiwa 8 (Tōji, 13 days until Shōkan)
Julian	10 December, AD 2026 (AM 7535)
Julian day	2461398
Korean	15 Jwidal, 4359 DE
Maya	13.0.14.3.15; 8 Kankin, 10 Men
Roman	ante diem IV Idus Decembres, MMDCCLXXIX AUC
Solar Hijri	2 Dey, SH 1405
Tibetan	14 mgo, me pho rta 2153 or 1772 or 1000

<<	December					>>
Su	Mo	Tu	We	Th	Fr	Sa
		1	2	3	4	5
6	7	8	9	10	11	12
13	14	15	16	17	18	19
20	21	22	23	24	25	26
27	28	29	30	31
2026

December 23 in recent years
2025 (Tuesday)
2024 (Monday)
2023 (Saturday)
2022 (Friday)
2021 (Thursday)
2020 (Wednesday)
2019 (Monday)
2018 (Sunday)
2017 (Saturday)
2016 (Friday)

December 23 is the 357th day of the year (358th in leap years) in the Gregorian calendar; eight days remain until the end of the year.

== Events ==
=== Pre-1600 ===
- 484 – The Arian Vandal Kingdom ceases its persecution of Nicene Christianity.
- 558 – Chlothar I is crowned King of the Franks.
- 583 – Maya queen Yohl Ik'nal is crowned ruler of Palenque.
- 962 – The Sack of Aleppo as part of the Arab–Byzantine wars: Under the future Emperor Nicephorus Phocas, Byzantine troops storm the city of Aleppo.
- 1299 – The Ilkhanate ruler Ghazan defeats a Mamluk army that opposes his invasion into Syria in the Battle of Wadi al-Khaznadar near Homs.
- 1598 – Arauco War: Governor of Chile Martín García Óñez de Loyola is killed in the Battle of Curalaba by Mapuches led by Pelantaru.

=== 1601–1900 ===
- 1688 – As part of the Glorious Revolution, King James II of England flees from England to Paris after being deposed in favor of his son-in-law and nephew, William of Orange and his daughter Mary.
- 1773 – Moscow State Academy of Choreography is founded under the reign of Catherine II. It is the second ballet school in Russia after Vaganova Academy of Russian Ballet.
- 1783 – George Washington resigns as commander-in-chief of the Continental Army at the Maryland State House in Annapolis, Maryland.
- 1793 – The Battle of Savenay: A decisive defeat of the royalist counter-revolutionaries in War in the Vendée during the French Revolution.
- 1815 – The novel Emma by Jane Austen is first published.
- 1823 – The poem "Account of a Visit from St. Nicholas," also known as "'Twas the Night Before Christmas," is published anonymously in the Troy Sentinel.
- 1876 – First day of the Constantinople Conference which resulted in agreement for political reforms in the Balkans.
- 1893 – The opera Hansel and Gretel by Engelbert Humperdinck is first performed.

=== 1901–present ===
- 1905 – The Tampere conference, where Vladimir Lenin and Joseph Stalin meet for the first time, is held in Tampere, Finland.
- 1913 – The Federal Reserve Act is signed into law by President Woodrow Wilson, creating the Federal Reserve System.
- 1914 – World War I: Australian and New Zealand troops arrive in Cairo, Egypt.
- 1914 – World War I: During the Battle of Sarikamish, Ottoman forces mistook one another for Russian troops. The following friendly fire incident leaves 2,000 Ottomans dead and many more wounded.
- 1916 – World War I: Battle of Magdhaba: Allied forces defeat Turkish forces in the Sinai Peninsula.
- 1919 – Sex Disqualification (Removal) Act 1919 becomes law in the United Kingdom, allowing women to serve as lawyers, civil servants, and in other professions, as well as to serve on juries.
- 1936 – Colombia becomes a signatory to the Buenos Aires copyright treaty.
- 1936 – Spanish Civil War: The Spanish Republic legalizes the Regional Defence Council of Aragon.
- 1941 – World War II: After 15 days of fighting, the Imperial Japanese Army occupies Wake Island.
- 1947 – The transistor is first demonstrated at Bell Laboratories.
- 1948 – Seven Japanese military and political leaders convicted of war crimes by the International Military Tribunal for the Far East are executed by Allied occupation authorities at Sugamo Prison in Tokyo, Japan.
- 1950 – Korean War: General Walton Walker dies in a jeep accident and is replaced by General Matthew Ridgway in the Eighth United States Army.
- 1954 – First successful kidney transplant is performed by J. Hartwell Harrison and Joseph Murray.
- 1955 – The first film adaptation of Väinö Linna's novel The Unknown Soldier, directed by Edvin Laine, premieres.
- 1960 – Hilkka Saarinen née Pylkkänen is murdered in the so-called "oven homicide" case in Krootila, Kokemäki, Finland.
- 1968 – The 82 sailors from the USS Pueblo are released after eleven months of internment in North Korea.
- 1970 – The North Tower of the World Trade Center in Manhattan, New York, New York is topped out at 417 metres (1,368 ft), making it the tallest building in the world.
- 1970 – The Democratic Republic of the Congo officially becomes a one-party state.
- 1972 – The Immaculate Reception is caught by Franco Harris to win the Pittsburgh Steelers their first ever playoff victory, after defeating the Oakland Raiders.
- 1972 – A 6.5 magnitude earthquake strikes the Nicaraguan capital of Managua killing more than 10,000.
- 1972 – The 16 survivors of the Andes flight disaster are rescued after 73 days, surviving by cannibalism.
- 1978 – Alitalia Flight 4128 crashes into the Tyrrhenian Sea while on approach to Falcone Borsellino Airport in Palermo, Italy, killing 108.
- 1979 – Soviet–Afghan War: Soviet Union forces occupy Kabul, the Afghan capital.
- 1984 – After experiencing an engine fire, Aeroflot Flight 3519 attempts to make an emergency landing at Krasnoyarsk International Airport but crashes, killing 110 of the 111 people on board.
- 1986 – Voyager, piloted by Dick Rutan and Jeana Yeager, lands at Edwards Air Force Base in California becoming the first aircraft to fly non-stop around the world without aerial or ground refueling.
- 1990 – History of Slovenia: In a referendum, 88.5% of Slovenia's overall electorate vote for independence from Yugoslavia.
- 2002 – A U.S. MQ-1 Predator is shot down by an Iraqi MiG-25 in the first combat engagement between a drone and conventional aircraft.
- 2003 – An explosion at the PetroChina Chuandongbei natural gas field in Kai County, Chongqing, China, kills at least 234.
- 2005 – An Antonov An-140, Azerbaijan Airlines Flight 217 from Baku, Azerbaijan, to Aktau, Kazakhstan, heading across the Caspian Sea, crashes, killing 23 people.
- 2007 – An agreement is made for the Kingdom of Nepal to be abolished and the country to become a federal republic with the Prime Minister becoming head of state.
- 2008 – A coup d'état occurs in Guinea hours after the death of President Lansana Conté.
- 2015 – A bomb explodes at Istanbul's Sabiha Gökçen Airport, killing one airport cleaner. The Kurdistan Freedom Hawks claim responsibility for the attack four days later.
- 2023 – A series of massacres targeting Berom civilians unfold in the Plateau State in Nigeria, killing over 200 people and further injuring over 500. No group claims responsibility.
- 2025 – The crash of Harmony Jets Flight 185 killed all eight people on board, including the Libyan Army chief Mohammed al-Haddad in Ankara, Turkey.

== Births ==
=== Pre-1600 ===
- 968 – Emperor Zhenzong of Song, emperor of the Song dynasty (died 1022)
- 1173 – Louis I, duke of Bavaria (died 1231)
- 1513 – Thomas Smith, English scholar and diplomat (died 1577)
- 1525 – John Albert I, duke of Mecklenburg (died 1576)
- 1573 – Giovanni Battista Crespi, Italian painter, sculptor and architect (died 1632)
- 1582 – Severo Bonini, Italian organist and composer (died 1663)
- 1544 – Anna of Saxony, only child and heiress of Maurice, Elector of Saxony (died 1577)
- 1597 – Martin Opitz, German poet and composer (died 1639)

=== 1601–1900 ===
- 1605 – Tianqi Emperor, Chinese emperor (died 1627)
- 1613 – Carl Gustaf Wrangel, Swedish field marshal and politician, Lord High Constable of Sweden (died 1676)
- 1621 – Heneage Finch, 1st Earl of Nottingham, English lawyer and politician, Lord Chancellor of England (died 1682)
- 1621 – Edmund Berry Godfrey, English lawyer and judge (died 1678)
- 1689 – Joseph Bodin de Boismortier, French composer (died 1755)
- 1690 – Pamheiba, Indian emperor (died 1751)
- 1713 – Maruyama Gondazaemon, Japanese sumo wrestler, the 3rd Yokozuna (died 1749)
- 1732 – Richard Arkwright, English businessman and inventor, invented the Water frame and Spinning frame (died 1792)
- 1750 – Frederick Augustus I of Saxony (died 1827)
- 1758 – Nathan Wilson, American soldier and politician (died 1834)
- 1766 – Wilhelm Hisinger, Swedish physicist and chemist (died 1852)
- 1777 – Alexander I of Russia (died 1825)
- 1782 – William Armstrong, American lawyer, civil servant, politician, and businessperson (died 1865)
- 1790 – Jean-François Champollion, French philologist, orientalist, and scholar (died 1832)
- 1793 – Dost Mohammad Khan, emir of Afghanistan (died 1863)
- 1804 – Charles Augustin Sainte-Beuve, French author, critic, and academic (died 1869)
- 1805 – Joseph Smith, American religious leader, founder of the Latter Day Saint movement (died 1844)
- 1807 – Anthony Mary Claret, Spanish Roman Catholic archbishop and missionary (died 1870)
- 1810 – Edward Blyth, English zoologist (died 1873)
- 1810 – Karl Richard Lepsius, German Egyptologist (died 1884)
- 1812 – Samuel Smiles, Scottish-English author (died 1904)
- 1812 – Henri-Alexandre Wallon, French historian and statesman (died 1904)
- 1819 – Jan Jakob Lodewijk ten Kate, Dutch pastor and poet (died 1889)
- 1822 – Wilhelm Bauer, German engineer (died 1875)
- 1828 – Mathilde Wesendonck, German poet and author (died 1902)
- 1839 – János Murkovics, Slovene-Hungarian author and educator (died 1917)
- 1843 – Richard Conner, American sergeant, Medal of Honor recipient (died 1924)
- 1854 – Henry B. Guppy, English botanist and author (died 1926)
- 1861 – Edgar P. Rucker, American lawyer, politician, and businessman (died 1908)
- 1865 – James M. Canty, American educator, school administrator, and businessperson (died 1964)
- 1867 – Madam C. J. Walker, American businesswoman and philanthropist (died 1919)
- 1870 – John Marin, American painter (died 1953)
- 1878 – Stephen Timoshenko, Ukrainian-American engineer and academic (died 1972)
- 1885 – Pierre Brissaud, French illustrator, painter, and engraver (died 1964)
- 1894 – Arthur Gilligan, English cricketer (died 1976)
- 1895 – Nola Luxford, New Zealand-American actress and broadcaster (died 1994)
- 1896 – Giuseppe Tomasi di Lampedusa, Italian lieutenant and author (died 1957)
- 1900 – Merle Barwis, American-Canadian supercentenarian (died 2014)
- 1900 – Marie Bell, French actress and stage director (died 1985)
- 1900 – Otto Soglow, American cartoonist (died 1975)

=== 1901–present ===
- 1901 – Viktor Gutić, Croatian fascist official (died 1947)
- 1902 – Norman Maclean, American author and academic (died 1990)
- 1902 – Charan Singh, Indian lawyer and politician, 5th Prime Minister of India (died 1987)
- 1907 – Manuel Lopes, Cape Verdean author and poet (died 2005)
- 1907 – James Roosevelt, American general and politician (died 1991)
- 1907 – Avraham Stern, Polish Zionist leader (died 1942)
- 1908 – Gertrude Bancroft, American economist (died 1985)
- 1908 – Yousuf Karsh, Armenian-Canadian photographer (died 2002)
- 1910 – Kurt Meyer, German SS general and convicted war criminal (died 1961)
- 1911 – James Gregory, American actor (died 2002)
- 1911 – Niels Kaj Jerne, English-Danish physician and immunologist, Nobel Prize laureate (died 1994)
- 1912 – Anna J. Harrison, American organic chemist and academic (died 1998)
- 1916 – Dino Risi, Italian director and screenwriter (died 2008)
- 1918 – José Greco, Italian-American dancer and choreographer (died 2000)
- 1918 – Helmut Schmidt, German soldier, economist, and politician, 5th Chancellor of Germany (died 2015)
- 1919 – Kenneth M. Taylor, American general and pilot (died 2006)
- 1921 – Guy Beaulne, Canadian actor and director (died 2001)
- 1922 – Micheline Ostermeyer, French discus thrower, shot putter, and pianist (died 2001)
- 1923 – Onofre Marimón, Argentinian race car driver (died 1954)
- 1923 – Günther Schifter, Austrian journalist and radio host (died 2008)
- 1923 – James Stockdale, American admiral and pilot, Medal of Honor recipient (died 2005)
- 1924 – Bob Kurland, American basketball player and politician (died 2013)
- 1925 – Duncan Hallas, English author and politician (died 2002)
- 1925 – Rayner Unwin, English publisher (died 2000)
- 1926 – Robert Bly, American poet and essayist (died 2021)
- 1926 – Harold Dorman, American singer-songwriter (died 1988)
- 1929 – Chet Baker, American jazz trumpet player, flugelhorn player, and singer (died 1988)
- 1929 – Dick Weber, American professional bowler (died 2005)
- 1931 – Ronnie Schell, American comedian and actor (died 2026)
- 1932 – Richard Clark Barkley, American soldier, academic, and diplomat, United States Ambassador to East Germany (died 2015)
- 1933 – Akihito, Emperor of Japan
- 1933 – Noella Leduc, American baseball player (died 2014)
- 1935 – Paul Hornung, American football player and sportscaster (died 2020)
- 1935 – Johnny Kidd, English singer-songwriter (died 1966)
- 1935 – Abdul Ghani Minhat, Malaysian footballer and manager (died 2012)
- 1935 – Esther Phillips, American R&B singer (died 1984)
- 1936 – Frederic Forrest, American actor (died 2023)
- 1936 – Bobby Ross, American football player and coach
- 1936 – Willie Wood, American football player (died 2020)
- 1937 – Barney Rosenzweig, American screenwriter and producer
- 1937 – Nelson Shanks, American painter, historian, and educator (died 2015)
- 1938 – Bob Kahn, American computer scientist and engineer, co-developed the Transmission Control Protocol
- 1939 – Nancy Graves, American sculptor and painter (died 1995)
- 1940 – Mamnoon Hussain, Pakistani businessman and politician, 12th President of Pakistan (died 2021)
- 1940 – Jorma Kaukonen, American singer-songwriter and guitarist
- 1940 – Robert Labine, Canadian politician (died 2021)
- 1940 – Jeanie Lambe, Scottish jazz singer (died 2020)
- 1940 – Kevin Longbottom, Australian rugby league player (died 1986)
- 1940 – Eugene Record, American soul singer-songwriter (died 2005)
- 1941 – Peter Davis, English businessman
- 1941 – Tim Hardin, American folk singer-songwriter and musician (died 1980)
- 1942 – Quentin Bryce, Australian lawyer and politician, 25th Governor-General of Australia
- 1943 – Ron Allen, American baseball player
- 1943 – Mikhail Leonidovich Gromov, Russian-French mathematician and academic
- 1943 – Terry Peder Rasmussen, American serial killer (died 2010)
- 1943 – Harry Shearer, American actor, voice artist, and comedian
- 1943 – Queen Silvia of Sweden
- 1944 – Wesley Clark, American general
- 1945 – Adly Mansour, Egyptian lawyer, judge, and politician, President of Egypt
- 1945 – Geoffrey Wheatcroft, English journalist and author
- 1946 – Robbie Dupree, American singer-songwriter
- 1946 – Edita Gruberová, Slovak soprano and actress (died 2021)
- 1946 – Susan Lucci, American actress
- 1946 – John Sullivan, English screenwriter, producer, and composer (died 2011)
- 1947 – Bill Rodgers, American runner
- 1948 – David Davis, English politician, Minister of State for Europe
- 1948 – Jim Ferguson, American guitarist, composer, and journalist
- 1948 – Jack Ham, American football player and sportscaster
- 1948 – Rick Wohlhuter, American runner
- 1949 – Adrian Belew, American singer-songwriter and guitarist
- 1949 – Reinhold Weege, American screenwriter and producer (died 2012)
- 1950 – Michael C. Burgess, American obstetrician and politician
- 1950 – Richard Dannatt, Baron Dannatt, English general
- 1950 – Vicente del Bosque, Spanish footballer and manager
- 1950 – Ilchi Lee, South Korean author and educator
- 1951 – Anthony Phillips, English guitarist and songwriter
- 1952 – William Kristol, American journalist, publisher, activist, and pundit
- 1953 – Andres Alver, Estonian architect and academic
- 1953 – Gerrit W. Gong, American religious leader and academic
- 1954 – Raivo Järvi, Estonian radio host and politician (died 2012)
- 1954 – Brian Teacher, American tennis player
- 1955 – Carol Ann Duffy, Scottish poet and playwright
- 1955 – Grace Knight, English-Australian singer-songwriter
- 1956 – Michele Alboreto, Italian race car driver (died 2001)
- 1956 – Dave Murray, English guitarist and songwriter
- 1957 – Dan Bigras, Canadian singer-songwriter
- 1957 – Peter Wynn, Australian rugby league player and businessman
- 1958 – Joan Severance, American actress
- 1958 – Victoria Williams, American singer-songwriter
- 1961 – Ezzat el Kamhawi, Egyptian journalist and author
- 1961 – Ketan J. Patel, Kenyan-English biologist and academic
- 1961 – Carol Smillie, Scottish model and actress
- 1961 – Lorna Tolentino, Filipino actress and producer
- 1962 – Bertrand Gachot, Belgian race car driver
- 1962 – Stefan Hell, Romanian-German physicist and chemist, Nobel Prize laureate
- 1962 – Kang Je-gyu, South Korean director, producer, and screenwriter
- 1962 – Keiji Mutoh, Japanese wrestler and actor
- 1963 – Jim Harbaugh, American football player and coach
- 1963 – Jess Harnell, American singer-songwriter and voice actor
- 1963 – Donna Tartt, American author
- 1963 – Ante Zelck, German businessman
- 1964 – Eddie Vedder, American singer-songwriter and guitarist
- 1966 – Badi Assad, Brazilian singer-songwriter and guitarist
- 1967 – Carla Bruni, Italian-French singer-songwriter and model
- 1967 – Otis Grant, Jamaican-Canadian boxer, coach, and manager
- 1968 – Karyn Bryant, American journalist, actress, producer, and screenwriter
- 1968 – Barry Kooser, American painter and animator
- 1968 – Manuel Rivera-Ortiz, Puerto Rican-American photographer
- 1968 – René Tretschok, German footballer and manager
- 1970 – Catriona LeMay Doan, Canadian speed skater and sportscaster
- 1970 – Karine Polwart, Scottish singer-songwriter and guitarist
- 1971 – Corey Haim, Canadian actor (died 2010)
- 1971 – Jo Johnson, English banker, journalist, and politician
- 1971 – Tara Palmer-Tomkinson, English model, actress, and author (died 2017)
- 1972 – Morgan, Italian singer-songwriter and composer
- 1972 – Christian Potenza, Canadian actor, voice actor and singer
- 1974 – Agustín Delgado, Ecuadorian footballer and politician
- 1974 – Mieszko Talarczyk, Polish-Swedish singer-songwriter, guitarist, and producer (died 2004)
- 1975 – Lady Starlight, American singer-songwriter
- 1976 – Joanna Hayes, American hurdler and coach
- 1976 – Brad Lidge, American baseball player
- 1976 – Jamie Noble, American wrestler and producer
- 1976 – Mikael Samuelsson, Swedish ice hockey player
- 1977 – Matt Baker, English television presenter
- 1977 – Alge Crumpler, American football player
- 1977 – Tore Johansen, Norwegian trumpeter and composer
- 1977 – Jari Mäenpää, Finnish singer-songwriter and guitarist
- 1978 – Esthero, Canadian-American singer-songwriter and producer
- 1978 – Aleš Kotalík, Czech ice hockey player
- 1978 – Víctor Martínez, Venezuelan baseball player
- 1979 – Johan Franzén, Swedish ice hockey player
- 1979 – Scott Gomez, American ice hockey player
- 1979 – Holly Madison, American model, television personality, and actress
- 1979 – Megan Mayhew Bergman, American author and educator
- 1979 – Kenny Miller, Scottish footballer
- 1979 – Yukifumi Murakami, Japanese javelin thrower
- 1980 – Cody Ross, American baseball player
- 1981 – Maritza Correia, Puerto Rican-American swimmer
- 1981 – Yuriorkis Gamboa, Cuban boxer
- 1981 – Hiro Fujiwara, Japanese manga artist
- 1981 – Agnes Milowka, Polish-Australian diver, explorer, photographer, and author (died 2011)
- 1981 – Mario Santana, Argentine footballer
- 1982 – Zbyněk Michálek, Czech ice hockey player
- 1982 – Shaone Morrisonn, Canadian-Croatian ice hockey player
- 1982 – Thomas Rohregger, Austrian cyclist
- 1983 – Michael Chopra, English footballer
- 1983 – Lisa Dobriskey, English runner
- 1983 – Hanley Ramírez, Dominican baseball player
- 1984 – Dudu Aharon, Israeli singer-songwriter
- 1984 – Bernard Pollard, American football player
- 1984 – Josh Satin, American baseball player
- 1984 – Sebastian Werle, German rugby player
- 1985 – Dev Hynes (also known as Blood Orange and formerly Lightspeed Champion), English singer, songwriter, producer, and composer
- 1985 – Harry Judd, English drummer and songwriter
- 1985 – Alison Sudol, American actress and singer-songwriter
- 1986 – Thomas Bourgin, French motorcycle racer (died 2013)
- 1986 – Beau Champion, Australian rugby league player
- 1986 – Balázs Dzsudzsák, Hungarian footballer
- 1986 – T. J. Oshie, American ice hockey player
- 1987 – Tommaso Bellazzini, Italian footballer
- 1987 – Owen Franks, New Zealand rugby player
- 1987 – Jori Lehterä, Finnish ice hockey player
- 1988 – Mallory Hagan, American beauty queen, Miss America 2013
- 1989 – David Szymanski, American video game developer
- 1990 – Brice Dja Djédjé, Ivorian footballer
- 1990 – Mitch Haniger, American baseball player
- 1990 – Anna Maria Perez de Tagle, American actress and singer
- 1991 – Kyren Wilson, English snooker player
- 1992 – Spencer Daniels, American actor
- 1992 – Mbwana Samatta, Tanzanian footballer
- 1992 – Jeff Schlupp, German footballer
- 1994 – Reed Alexander, American actor
- 1996 – Bartosz Kapustka, Polish footballer
- 1999 – Samuel Lino, Brazilian footballer
- 2000 – Victor Boniface, Nigerian footballer
- 2002 – Finn Wolfhard, Canadian actor and musician

== Deaths ==
=== Pre-1600 ===
- 423 – Ming Yuan Di, ruler of Northern Wei (born 392)
- 484 – Huneric, Vandal king
- 668 – Gabriel of Beth Qustan, bishop and saint (born 594)
- 679 – Dagobert II, Frankish king (probable; b. 650)
- 761 – Gaubald, Frankish bishop (born 700)
- 889 – Solomon II, bishop of Constance
- 910 – Naum of Preslav, Bulgarian missionary and scholar
- 918 – Conrad I, king of East Francia (born 890)
- 940 – Ar-Radi, Abbasid caliph (born 909)
- 1172 – Ugo Ventimiglia, Italian cardinal
- 1193 – Thorlak, patron saint of Iceland (born 1133)
- 1230 – Berengaria of Navarre, queen of England (born 1165)
- 1304 – Matilda of Habsburg, duchess regent of Bavaria (born 1253)
- 1383 – Beatrice of Bourbon, Queen of Bohemia (born 1320)
- 1384 – Thomas Preljubović, ruler of Epirus
- 1392 – Isabella of Castile, duchess of York (born 1355)
- 1556 – Nicholas Udall, English cleric, playwright, and educator (born 1504)
- 1572 – Johann Sylvan, German theologian (executed; date of birth unknown)
- 1575 – Akiyama Nobutomo, Japanese samurai (born 1531)
- 1588 – Henry I, duke of Guise (born 1550)

=== 1601–1900 ===
- 1631 – Michael Drayton, English poet and playwright (born 1563)
- 1638 – Barbara Longhi, Italian painter (born 1552)
- 1646 – François Maynard, French poet and academic (born 1582)
- 1652 – John Cotton, English minister and theologian (born 1585)
- 1675 – Caesar, duc de Choiseul, French general and diplomat (born 1602)
- 1722 – Pierre Varignon, French mathematician and academic (born 1654)
- 1761 – Alastair Ruadh MacDonnell, Scottish spy (born 1725)
- 1771 – Marie-Marguerite d'Youville, Canadian nun and saint, founded Grey Nuns (born 1701)
- 1779 – Augustus Hervey, 3rd Earl of Bristol, English admiral and politician, Chief Secretary for Ireland (born 1724)
- 1789 – Charles-Michel de l'Épée, French priest and educator (born 1712)
- 1795 – Henry Clinton, English general and politician (born 1730)
- 1805 – Pehr Osbeck, Swedish explorer and author (born 1723)
- 1834 – Thomas Robert Malthus, English economist and demographer (born 1766)
- 1884 – John Chisum, American businessman and poker player (born 1824)
- 1889 – Constance Naden, English poet and philosopher (born 1858)
- 1892 – Frederick Tracy Dent, Brigadier General in the Regular United States Army, brother in law to President Ulysses S. Grant.

=== 1901–present ===
- 1902 – Frederick Temple, English archbishop and academic (born 1821)
- 1906 – Mdungazwe Ngungunyane Nxumalo, last emperor of the Gaza Empire (born c.1850)
- 1912 – Otto Schoetensack, German anthropologist and academic (born 1850)
- 1926 – Swami Shraddhanand, Indian monk, missionary, and educator (born 1856)
- 1930 – Mustafa Fehmi Kubilay, Turkish lieutenant and educator (born 1906)
- 1931 – Wilson Bentley, American meteorologist and photographer (born 1865)
- 1939 – Anthony Fokker, Indonesia-born Dutch pilot and engineer, designed the Fokker Dr.I and Fokker D.VII (born 1890)
- 1946 – John A. Sampson, American gynecologist and academic (born 1873)
- 1948 – Executions resulting from convictions at the Tokyo War Crimes Tribunal
  - Kenji Doihara, Japanese general (born 1883)
  - Kōki Hirota, Japanese diplomat and politician, 32nd Prime Minister of Japan (born 1878)
  - Seishirō Itagaki, Japanese general (born 1885)
  - Heitarō Kimura, Japanese general (born 1888)
  - Iwane Matsui, Japanese general (born 1878)
  - Akira Mutō, Japanese general (born 1883)
  - Hideki Tojo, Japanese general and politician, 40th Prime Minister of Japan (born 1884)
- 1950 – Vincenzo Tommasini, Italian composer (born 1878)
- 1953 – Lavrentiy Beria, Soviet general and politician, head of the People's Commissariat for Internal Affairs (born 1899)
- 1954 – René Iché, French soldier and sculptor (born 1897)
- 1961 – Carolyn Sherwin Bailey, American author (born 1875)
- 1961 – Kurt Meyer, German SS general and convicted war criminal (born 1910)
- 1970 – Charles Ruggles, American actor (born 1886)
- 1970 – Aleksander Warma, Estonian lieutenant and politician, Prime Minister of Estonia in exile (born 1890)
- 1972 – Andrei Tupolev, Russian engineer, designed the Tupolev Tu-95 and Tupolev Tu-104 (born 1888)
- 1973 – Irna Phillips, American screenwriter, created Guiding Light and As the World Turns (born 1901)
- 1979 – Peggy Guggenheim, American-Italian art collector (born 1898)
- 1982 – Jack Webb, American actor, director, producer, and screenwriter (born 1920)
- 1983 – Colin Middleton, Irish painter and illustrator (born 1910)
- 1984 – Joan Lindsay, Australian author and playwright (born 1896)
- 1992 – Vincent Fourcade, French interior designer (born 1934)
- 1994 – Sebastian Shaw, English actor, director, and playwright (born 1905)
- 1995 – Patric Knowles, English actor (born 1911)
- 1998 – Joe Orlando, Italian-American author and illustrator (born 1927)
- 2000 – Billy Barty, American actor (born 1924)
- 2000 – Victor Borge, Danish-American comedian, pianist, and conductor (born 1909)
- 2001 – Bola Ige, Nigerian lawyer and politician, 3rd Governor of Oyo State (born 1930)
- 2004 – P. V. Narasimha Rao, Indian lawyer and politician, 9th Prime Minister of India (born 1921)
- 2005 – Lajos Baróti, Hungarian footballer and manager (born 1914)
- 2005 – Yao Wenyuan, Chinese writer and politician, member of the Gang of Four (born 1931)
- 2006 – Charlie Drake, English actor (born 1925)
- 2006 – Timothy J. Tobias, American pianist and composer (born 1952)
- 2006 – Johnny Vincent, English footballer (born 1947)
- 2007 – William Francis Ganong, Jr., American physiologist and academic (born 1924)
- 2007 – Michael Kidd, American dancer and choreographer (born 1915)
- 2007 – Oscar Peterson, Canadian pianist and composer (born 1925)
- 2009 – Robert L. Howard, American colonel, Medal of Honor recipient (born 1939)
- 2009 – Ngapoi Ngawang Jigme, Tibetan general and politician (born 1910)
- 2009 – Edward Schillebeeckx, Belgian theologian and academic (born 1914)
- 2010 – Fred Hargesheimer, American soldier and pilot (born 1916)
- 2010 – K. Karunakaran, Indian lawyer and politician, 7th Chief Minister of Kerala (born 1918)
- 2011 – Aydın Menderes, Turkish economist and politician (born 1946)
- 2012 – Jean Harris, American educator and murderer (born 1923)
- 2012 – Eduardo Maiorino, Brazilian mixed martial artist and kick-boxer (born 1979)
- 2013 – Chryssa, Greek-American sculptor (born 1933)
- 2013 – Mikhail Kalashnikov, Russian general and weapons designer, designed the AK-47 rifle (born 1919)
- 2013 – Yusef Lateef, American saxophonist, composer, and educator (born 1920)
- 2013 – Ricky Lawson, American drummer and composer (born 1954)
- 2013 – G. S. Shivarudrappa, Indian poet and educator (born 1926)
- 2013 – Robert W. Wilson, American philanthropist and art collector (born 1928)
- 2014 – Edward Greenspan, Canadian lawyer and author (born 1944)
- 2014 – Robert V. Hogg, American statistician and academic (born 1924)
- 2015 – Alfred G. Gilman, American pharmacologist and biochemist, Nobel Prize laureate (born 1941)
- 2015 – Don Howe, English footballer and manager (born 1935)
- 2015 – Jean-Marie Pelt, French biologist, pharmacist, and academic (born 1933)
- 2015 – Bülent Ulusu, Turkish admiral and politician, 18th Prime Minister of Turkey (born 1923)
- 2017 – Maurice Hayes, Irish educator and politician (born 1927)
- 2020 – Leslie West, American singer and guitarist (born 1945)
- 2021 – Joan Didion, American writer (born 1934)
- 2022 – Brandon Montrell, American TikTok personality and stand-up comedian (born 1979)
- 2023 – William Pope.L, American performance artist (born 1955)
- 2024 – Shyam Benegal, Indian director and screenwriter (born 1934)
- 2024 – Dési Bouterse, Surinamese general and politician, 9th President of Suriname (born 1945)
- 2024 – Sophie Hediger, Swiss snowboarder (born 1998)

== Holidays and observances ==
- Birthday of the Queen Silvia, an official flag flying day (Sweden)
- Children's Day (South Sudan and Sudan)
- Christian Feast Day:
  - Abassad (Coptic Church)
  - Behnam, Sarah, and the Forty Martyrs (Coptic Church)
  - Dagobert II
  - John Cantius
  - O Emmanuel
  - Psote (Coptic Church)
  - Thorlac Thorhallsson, patron saint of Iceland; The last day of preparations before Christmas.
  - Victoria
  - December 23 (Eastern Orthodox liturgics)
- Day of all level operational control structures servicemen (Ukraine)
- Festivus, a secular holiday made popular by the sitcom Seinfeld
- HumanLight (Secular humanism in United States)
- Kisan Diwas (Uttar Pradesh, India)
- Night of the Radishes (Oaxaca City, Mexico)
- Tibb's Eve (Newfoundland and Labrador)
- Tom Bawcock's Eve (Mousehole, Cornwall)
- Victory Day (Egypt)
