= Prancer =

Prancer may refer to:

- Prancer (film), the 1989 motion picture
- One of Santa Claus's reindeer, as named in "The Night Before Christmas"
- Tartan Prancer, fictional vehicle featured in 2015 film Vacation
- A character in Ice Age: A Mammoth Christmas
