= Christmas stocking =

Receptacle for Christmas gifts

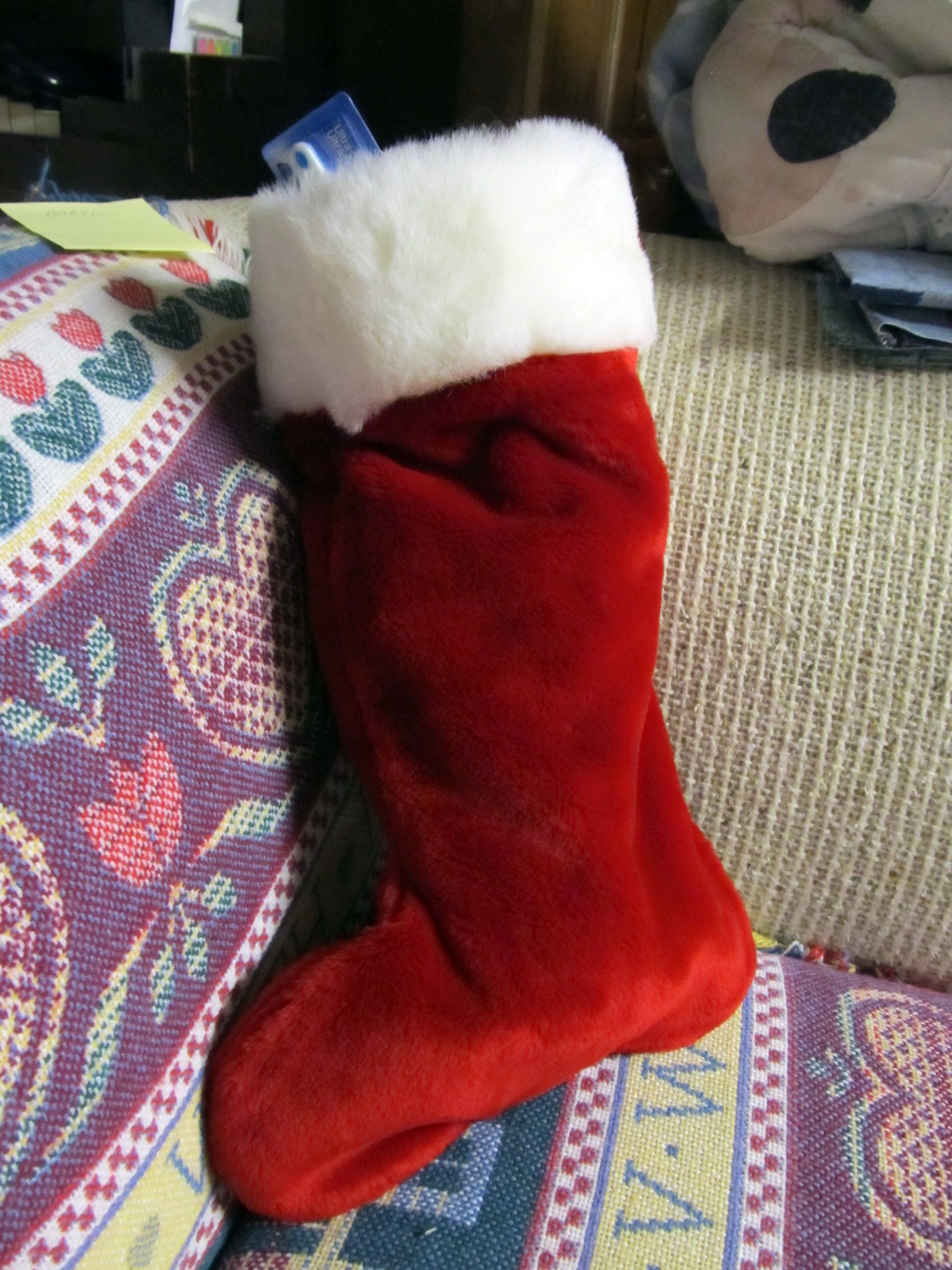
A filled Christmas stocking

A Christmas stocking is an empty sock or sock-shaped bag that is hung on Saint Nicholas Day or Christmas Eve so that Saint Nicholas (or the related figures of Santa Claus and Father Christmas) can fill it with small toys, candy, fruit, coins or other small gifts when he arrives. These small items are often referred to as stocking stuffers or stocking fillers. The tradition of the Christmas stocking is thought to originate from the life of Saint Nicholas. In some Christmas stories, the contents of the Christmas stocking are the only toys the child receives at Christmas from Santa Claus; in other stories (and in tradition), some presents are also wrapped up in wrapping paper and placed under the Christmas tree. Tradition in Western culture threatens that a child who behaves badly during the year will receive only a piece or pile of coal. Some people even put their Christmas stocking by their bedposts so Santa Claus can fill it by the bed while they sleep.

== History ==
Stockings on a fireplace mantel

The origin of the Christmas stocking is thought to originate in the life of Saint Nicholas. While there are no written records of the origin of the Christmas stocking, there are popular legends that attempt to tell the history of the Christmas tradition.

One such legend has several variations, but the following is a good example: Saint Nicholas was staying with a poor family and heard that the father was planning to sell his three daughters into prostitution to save them all from starvation. Saint Nicholas wanted to help but knew that the old man would not accept charity, so he decided to help in secret. When he left the house after dark he threw three bags of gold through an open window; one landed in a stocking. When the girls and their father woke up the next morning they found the bags of gold and were, of course, overjoyed. The girls were saved from their sad fate. Other versions of the story say that Saint Nicholas threw the three bags of gold directly into the stockings, which were hung by the fireplace to dry.

This led to the custom of children hanging stockings or putting out shoes, eagerly awaiting gifts from Saint Nicholas. Sometimes the story is told with gold balls instead of bags of gold; this variation is why three gold balls, sometimes represented as oranges, are one of the symbols for Saint Nicholas. This is also the origin of three gold balls being used as a symbol for pawnbrokers.

A tradition that began in a European country originally, children simply used one of their everyday socks, but eventually special Christmas stockings were created for this purpose. These stockings are traditionally used on Saint Nicholas Day although in the early 1800s, they also came to be used on Christmas Eve.

Christmas stockings were mentioned and illustrated as an American tradition as early as 1821 in the anonymous poem "Old Santeclaus with Much Delight", and again in 1823 in "A Visit from St Nicholas".

== Present day ==
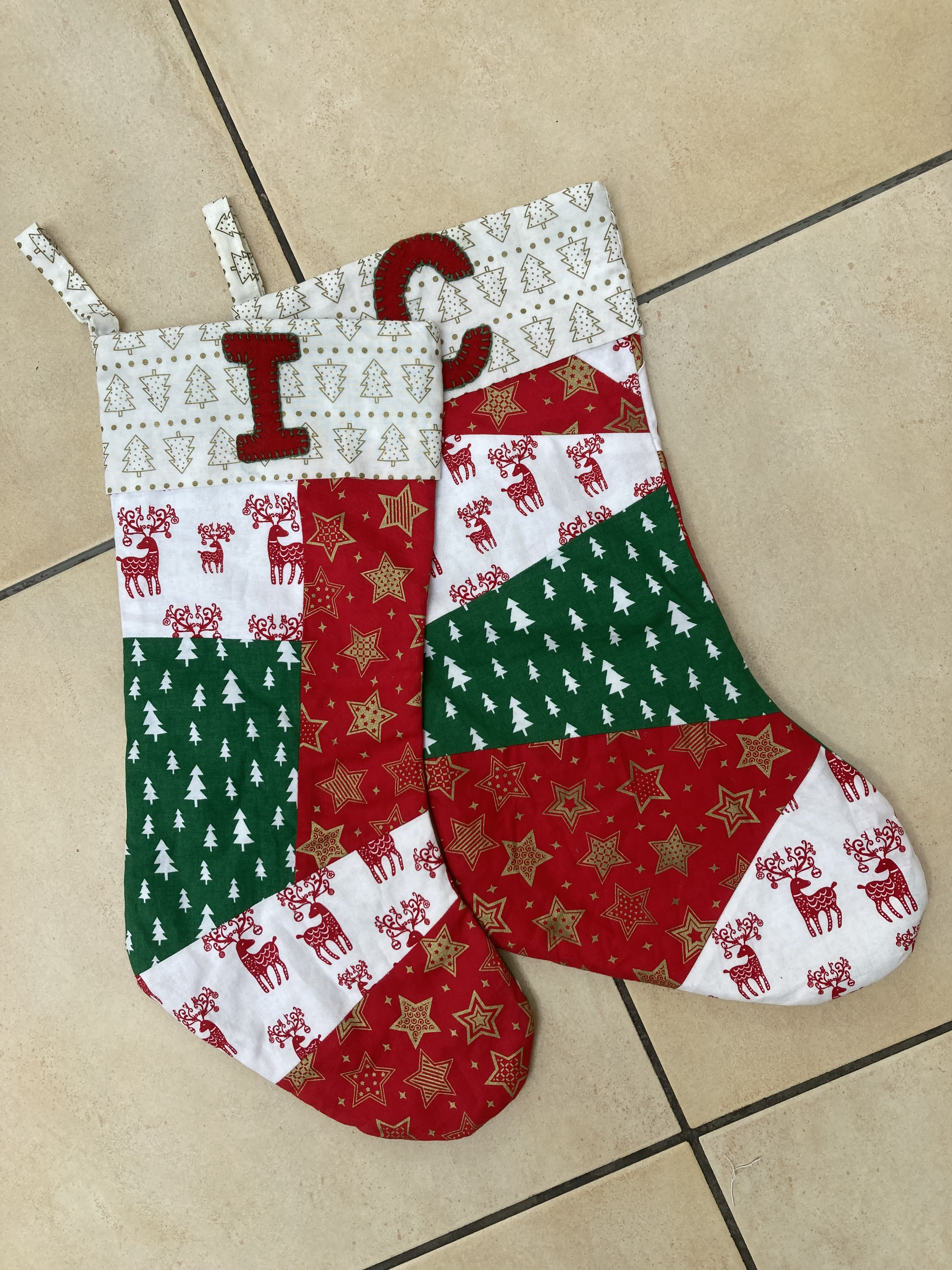
Homemade patchwork Christmas stockings

Today, stores carry a large variety of styles and sizes of Christmas stockings, and Christmas stockings are also a popular homemade craft. Many families create their own Christmas stockings with each family member's name applied to the stocking so that Santa will know which stocking belongs to which family member.

== See also ==
- Christmas shopping
- Christmas decoration
