= Beaulne =

Beaulne is a French surname. Notable people with the surname include:

- Guy Beaulne, Canadian actor-director
- Joseph Charles Léonard Yvon Beaulne, Canadian diplomat

== See also ==
- Vendresse-Beaulne, commune of the Ainse department of France
