= John Joseph Duda =

American child actor

John Joseph Duda (born March 19, 1977) is an American child actor best known for starring in the Christmas movie Prancer.

== Life ==
John Joseph Duda was born to Deborah Sullivan and John Duda Sr. in Oak Lawn, Illinois. He has two younger siblings, Sara (born 1978) and Kevin (born 1981). His mother was a nurse, and his sister was a musician actress. He is of Irish and Polish descent.

In elementary school, Duda was an avid piano player and was part of the Oak Lawn singing group Kids Spectacular. He became passionate about acting at a young age. He graduated from St. Ignatius College Prep and Harvard University. At Harvard he studied economics and was a stage manager and singer for the a cappella group Din & Tonics. He worked as a teacher and mentor for middle and high school students, earning a doctorate in education from UCLA in 2011, and has founded multiple nonprofit organizations to benefit students.

== Career ==
At age ten, John Duda played Ebenezer Scrooge as a boy in Goodman Theatre's 1987 presentation of A Christmas Carol. Over 200 children auditioned for five roles available. His brother Kevin earned the part of Tiny Tim. The adaptation for the theatre's 10th anniversary of the play added minor scenes, some with young Ebenezer, giving John more time on stage. John was described as, "Already quite a professional... poised and articulate." Between rehearsals, John worked hard to advance his acting career by going to other auditions and recording tapes.

Duda's first film acting role was in Eyes of an Angel, which was filmed March 14, 1988, but not released until 1991. Duda's first movie to be released was his second role, Prancer, which was filmed from February 3 to April 15, 1989.

In Rudy, his brother Kevin played his only movie role alongside him.

Many of the filming locations where Duda worked for various movies were in Chicago, with others nearby in the Midwest.

Duda was praised for his performance in Prancer as Steve Riggs. "Duda is just right as the brother," wrote Kevin Thomas for the Los Angeles Times.

== Filmography ==
Year	Title	Role	Ref.
1989	Prancer	Steve Riggs	
1990	Flatliners	Young David	
1991	Backdraft	Young Stephen	
1991	Eyes of an Angel	Alan	
1993	The Woman Who Loved Elvis	Paperboy	
1993	Rudy	Young Frank	
