= Pamela McColl =

Canadian author

- Education: University of Manitoba
- Occupations: Author, historian

Pamela McColl is a Canadian publishing author, best known for publishing a revised version of Twas The Night Before Christmas.

== Career ==
She is a drug prevention and child rights advocate she has been published in the Birth Institute journal on the smoking cessation and the risks of the use of marijuana in pregnancy. She is a director on the advisory council of the national not-for-profit corporation Smart Approaches to Marijuana Canada. In 2014 she wrote The Pied Piper of Pot: Protecting Youth From the Marijuana Industry and in 2015, she edited the book On Marijuana, a collection of essays and articles from opponents of cannabis legalisation. She is the publisher of seven books, including Pacific Spirit: The Forest Reborn.

McColl's company Grafton and Scratch Publishing published Baby and Me Tobacco Free, which she co-authored with Laurie Adams. It also published Twas The Night Before Christmas, her revised, "smoke-free" version of A Visit from St. Nicholas (1823). In 2023 she wrote Twas the Night - The Art and History of the Classic Christmas Poem that won a silver history award by the IBPA Benjamin Franklin Awards. In 2024 she wrote Wondrous Mrs. Claus - A Pictorial and Literary History of the Christmas Character and What Would Mrs. Claus Do? Where There is a Wish There is a Way.
