= Eyes of an Angel =

1991 film

- Theatrical release poster
- Directed by: Robert Harmon
- Written by: Robert Stitzel
- Produced by: Michael Phillips; Chris Chesser
- Starring: John Travolta; Ellie Raab; Tito Larriva; Jeffrey DeMunn
- Cinematography: Theo van de Sande
- Edited by: Donn Cambern; Zach Staenberg
- Music by: Randy Edelman
- Production company: Trans World Entertainment
- Distributed by: Live Home Video
- Release dates: September 25, 1991 (France); December 21, 1994 (United States)
- Running time: 91 minutes
- Country: USA
- Language: English
- Budget: $10 million

Eyes of an Angel is a 1991 American drama film starring John Travolta and directed by Robert Harmon. It was released in France, Sweden, and on television in the United States as The Tender. It was released straight-to-video in 1994 under its proper title to coincide with Travolta's bigger name release, Pulp Fiction. According to the opening credits, the movie is based on a true story. The film was shot predominantly in Chicago with some pickups and reshoots in Los Angeles. It was the final film to be produced under the Trans World Entertainment label.

Travolta plays Bobby Allen, a down-on-his-luck single father and recovering alcoholic whose wife died of a drug overdose. With no job and no money, he turns to Cissy, his late wife's brother, for a job as a money courier, while his 10-year-old daughter finds a wounded fighting dog. She takes care of the dog over her father's objections, until Bobby is betrayed by Cissy, who blames him for his sister's death. Desperate, Bobby steals Cissy's money and flees with the girl to California, leaving the dog behind. The dog follows them across the country to be reunited with the girl, while Cissy pursues Bobby to retrieve his money and take the girl.

== Plot ==
Partygoers gather at a mansion. A man named Bobby also enters the party. A man tries to make him leave, but Bobby claims to have an appointment with Cissy. When Cissy shows up, Bobby says he has a business opportunity for him, a dry cleaning store. Bobby notices a station wagon entering the garage. In the garage, the man in the station wagon opens the back to reveal a Doberman Pinscher, muzzled, in a small metal cage.

Back at the party, Bobby snacks until Cissy comes to visit. Bobby tries again to get him to consider the business, but Cissy only asks if he is drinking, which Bobby denies. Cissy leads him downstairs where the other party goers are gathering. A white pit bull is on one side being held by a man, while the Doberman's cage is on the other. Cissy begins the dogfight and the dogs clash. The Doberman is seriously wounded during the fight and is, later that night, thrown into the river by his owner.

The next morning, Baby takes money from an envelope hidden in the headboard of a bed, and buys a cigarette lighter, which she has giftwrapped. Back at the house she decorates a misshapen cake with M&M's. Bobby discovers the missing money, and yells at her for stealing the money.

They arrive home to find Cissy and some of his goons waiting in their apartment. Bobby complains about Cissy breaking in, but Cissy says he got a key from his sister. Cissy tells him to come by and he might have something for him.

Baby finds the Doberman, shivering and whimpering in pain. She cares for him as best she can, and he follows her home and then into a subway station, where he is captured by animal control employees. Baby and her friend Alan find where the dog was taken. Baby and Alan distract the worker by dropping some money, and quietly lifting the latch on the kennel, then they leave. That night, the dog escapes the pound and finds his way back to Baby.

In the morning, Bobby recognizes it as the fighting dog he saw at Cissy's and demands she get rid of it. He goes to Cissy, where he is offered a job doing pickups with a car included. Bobby accepts. Cissy seems to blame Bobby for his sister's death. Baby returns the dog to where she found it, but it gets back to the apartment before she does.

Bobby goes out to do his pickups. At Cissy's place, Cissy complains that Bobby has been on time all day and even refused a drink. Cissy thinks it is too much for Bobby to raise and sends two of his goons to go pick up Bobby. Bobby asks what's going on, and they pretend to check the receipts. They take him out to a remote bridge area, accuse him of being short, and drag him out of the car, where they proceed to beat him. Bobby manages to fight them off.

Bobby gets to a phone and calls Baby. He tells her they are taking a trip and to pack a bag very quickly, then meet him at the steps of the park. She comes with the dog. Bobby hustles her into the car with the bag but refuses to allow her to bring the dog. She refuses to come, and he relents but abandons the dog in a junkyard.

At a truck stop, Bobby explains that they are going to Los Angeles and lies and says that Cissy loaned it to him for the trip. As they leave, the girl drops her glove in the parking lot. Back in Chicago, Cissy and his men are tearing up Bobby's apartment, where they find a letter from Bobby's brother. Late that night, the dog arrives at the truck stop and finds the girl's glove.

While filling up the gas tank, Bobby asks if he should call George. The girl says he should. While he makes the call, the girl goes to the side of the gas station and leaves a sock on the road. On the phone, Bobby tells George he'll be in L.A. that he'll be there in the morning and gets an invitation to come over. Bobby sees Baby putting the sock on the road and tries to take it back. Bobby helps her by putting rocks on it to keep the wind from blowing it. As they head back to the car, Bobby mentions that L.A. has good schools.

The dog continues to follow. Bobby and Baby arrive at George's house, where they are greeted warmly. Bobby tells him that he plans to live there and get a job.

The dog stops in the barn of a small ranch, where the owner and its dog find him. The man notices the dog's nails are worn down almost to his paws, so he treats them while his dog warms up the Doberman. The next morning, the dog sets off again, arriving in Los Angeles the next morning.

George tells Bobby he has a contractor friend who might have a job for Bobby. Bobby and George end up in another argument, which ends when George leaves Bobby on the side of a freeway. When he gets back to the house, Bobby barks at the girl to get her things because they are leaving. They drive to a motel, but someone steals their car, along with the money.

As George and his family eat dinner, Cissy's two goons show up asking where Bobby is. George tells him he doesn't know where Bobby is, so Cissy leaves his number and tells him to call if Bobby contacts him. Cissy tells him they just want the money and reminds him that they know where George lives.

The girl suggests going back to George, but Bobby refuses. Bobby tells her he's going to take her to George's and leave her there while he gets himself together.

He calls George, and apologizes about the fight, confused about why George is so mad. After George explains, Bobby hangs up to realize the girl has left. He searches for her, even calling George again.

The dog arrives at the same bridge the girl stood on a few nights ago, and picks up her scent. He follows it through the city, but finds a crying, drunken Bobby instead. The dog leads him to the girl back at the bridge, where she ecstatically greets the dog. Bobby, still crying, hugs her and apologizes. They go back to George's, where the brothers hug. While the girl plays outside, Bobby explains everything to George.

Cissy's goons beat Bobby up badly. Cissy offers Baby anything she wants if she goes back to Chicago. She goes over to Bobby in answer. As Cissy goes to leave the room, Cissy is confronted by the dog. Cissy doesn't believe it's the same dog that lost the fight, but when the girl says the dog followed them from Chicago, he decides that he wants the dog to fight again. Cissy tells Bobby it's his chance to get out of the situation in one piece.

Baby treats Bobby's wounds while the dog looks on. While Bobby sleeps, Cissy is on the phone ordering a dog to fight the Doberman. Back at the bridge, Baby is crying over the Doberman, where Bobby finds her. She tells him she's worried and that she loves him. Bobby tells her he has a plan and reminds her of what she used to do when she was little and he and Brenda were fighting.

The next day they take the dog to the location for the fight. Bobby leaves Baby outside and tells her he loves her, and tells her to remember "when the bell rings". The Doberman is pitted against a huge mastiff-looking dog. When the bell rings, the girl runs in crying Bobby's name. The crowd's cheers die down and she begs Bobby to make them stop hurting her dog. They stop the fight and break up the dog, and the Doberman runs over to the girl.

As the crowd quietly stares at Cissy, Bobby walks across the ring and knocks Cissy into the ring, where the Doberman attacks him. It rips his coat and pants before getting hold of Cissy's neck. Bobby stands over Cissy and tells him, "It's over." When Cissy agrees, the dog lets go. Bobby and Baby leave with the dog as Cissy's goons help him up.

== Cast ==
- John Travolta as Bobby
- Ellie Raab as The Girl
- Tito Larriva as Cissy
- Richard Edson as Goon
- Vincent Guastaferro as Goon
- Jeffrey DeMunn as George
- Lisa Ziegler as George's Wife
- Rudd Weatherwax as The Dog's Handler
- John Joseph Duda as Alan
- Tripoli as The Dog

== Distribution ==
Although Eyes of an Angel was released in France in 1991, it was not released in the United States until 1994, when Travolta's career was revived with the release of Pulp Fiction. At that point, it was released straight to VHS format. It was released on DVD in 2002.

== Reception ==
Despite the star appeal of Travolta, actor Michael Douglas being an executive producer, and having a soundtrack from Randy Edelman, Eyes of an Angel seemed to gain little attention upon its release. Robert Harmon was, however, nominated for a Critics Award for the film at the 1991 Deauville Film Festival in France (under its original name of The Tender).
