= Santa Claus's reindeer =

Legendary sleigh-pulling flying reindeer

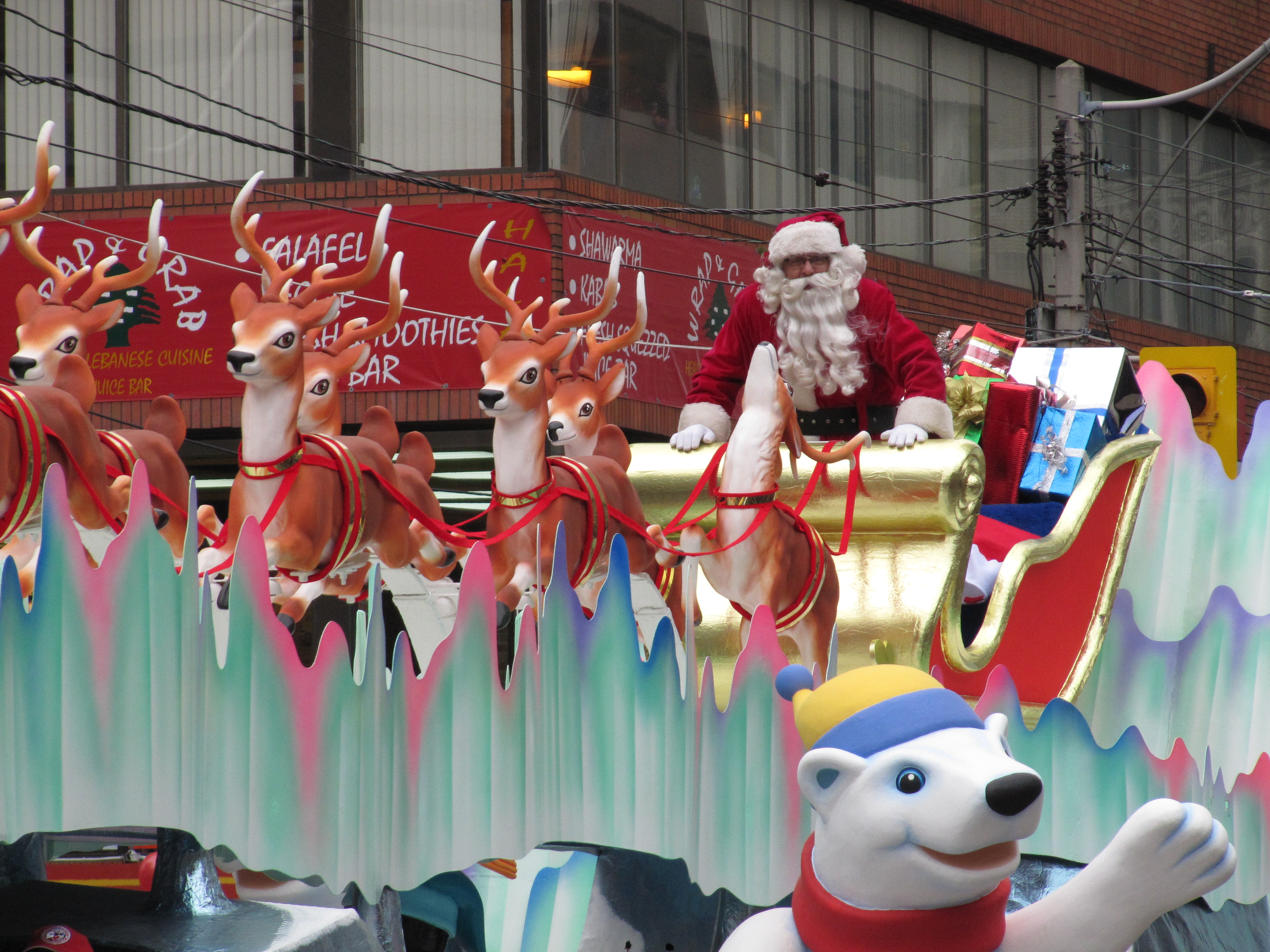
A parade float with a model of Santa's reindeer and sleigh in the Toronto Santa Claus Parade, 2009

In traditional Western festive legend and popular culture, Santa Claus's reindeer are said to pull a sleigh through the night sky to help Santa Claus deliver gifts to children during the night between Christmas Eve and Christmas Day.

While various legends offer differing details, the 1823 poem A Visit from St. Nicholas (usually attributed to the American writer Clement Clarke Moore) has proved the most enduring. It describes Santa's sleigh being pulled by a team of eight reindeer, best known as Dasher, Dancer, Prancer, Vixen, Comet, Cupid, Donner, and Blitzen. (Note: The original poem names two reindeer "Dunder" and "Blixem": Dunder and Blixem derive from Dutch words for thunder and lightning, respectively.)

The popularity of the 1939 story "Rudolph the Red-Nosed Reindeer", and the 1949 Christmas song of the same name, has resulted in Rudolph often being included among the team.

== Origins and history ==
=== Single reindeer ===
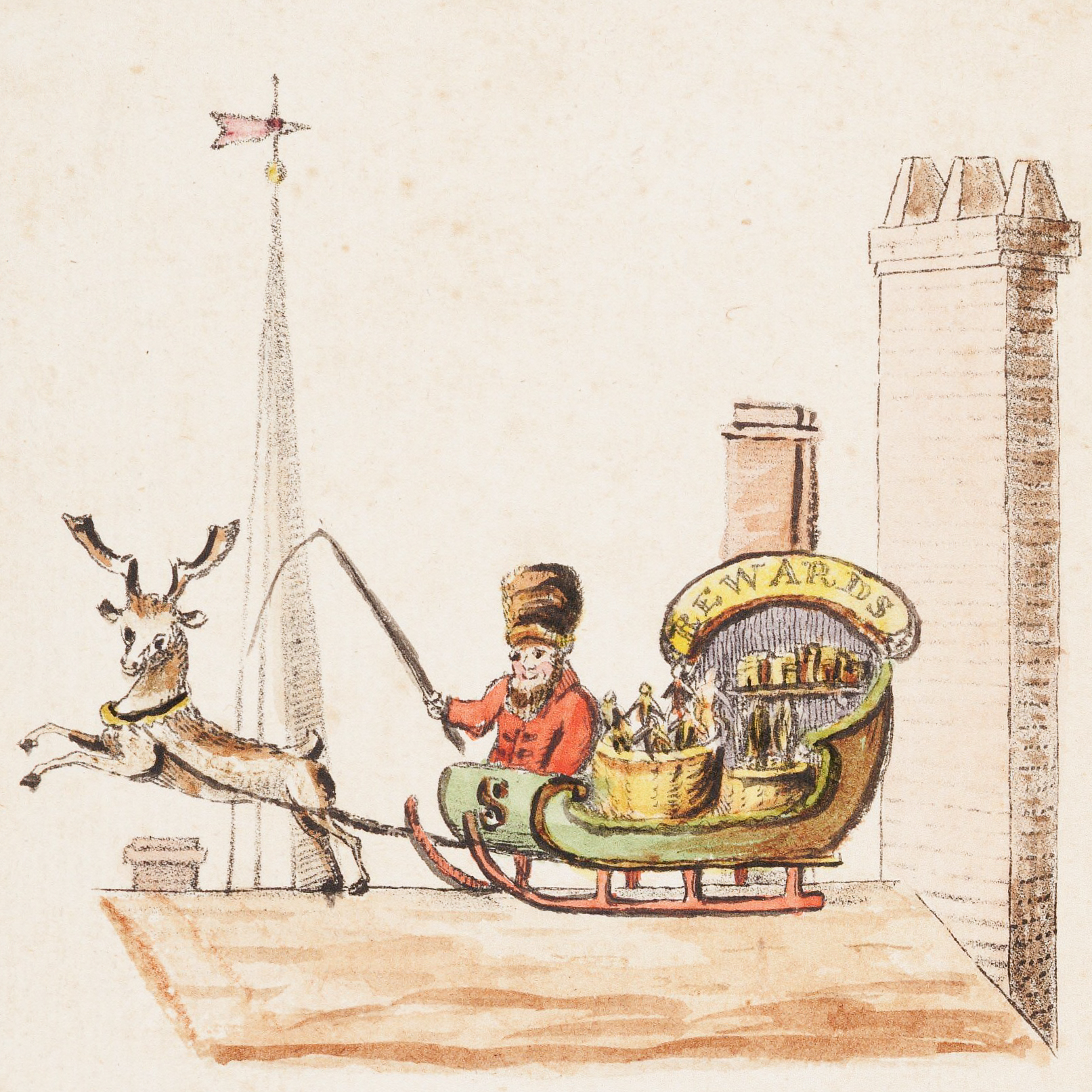
Illustration to the first verse of "Old Santeclaus with Much Delight", 1821

The first reference to Santa's sleigh being pulled by a reindeer appears in "Old Santeclaus with Much Delight", an 1821 illustrated children's poem published in New York. The names of the author and the illustrator are not known. The poem, with eight colored lithographic illustrations, was published by William B. Gilley as a small paperback book entitled The Children's Friend: A New-Year's Present, to the Little Ones from Five to Twelve. The illustration to the first verse features a sleigh with a sign saying "REWARDS" being pulled by an unnamed single reindeer.

=== Eight reindeer ===
The 1823 poem usually attributed to Clement C. Moore, A Visit from St. Nicholas, is largely credited for the modern Christmas lore that includes eight named reindeer.

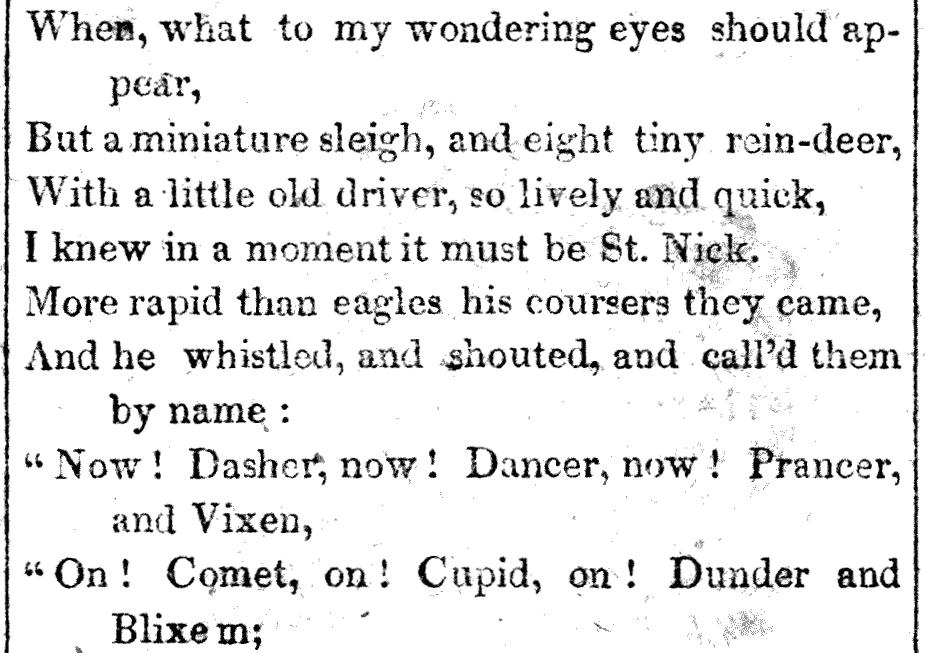
The eight reindeer, as they appeared in the first publication of Account of a Visit from St. Nicholas in 1823

The poem was first published in the Sentinel of Troy, New York, on 23 December 1823. All eight reindeer were named, the first six being Dasher, Dancer, Prancer, Vixen, Comet and Cupid; the final two, "Dunder" and "Blixem", are from a Dutch oath meaning "thunder" and "lightning". The relevant part of the poem reads:

More rapid than eagles his coursers they came,
And he whistled, and shouted, and call'd them by name:
"Now! Dasher, now! Dancer, now! Prancer, and Vixen,
"On! Comet, on! Cupid, on! Dunder and Blixem;
"To the top of the porch! to the top of the wall!
"Now dash away! dash away! dash away all!"

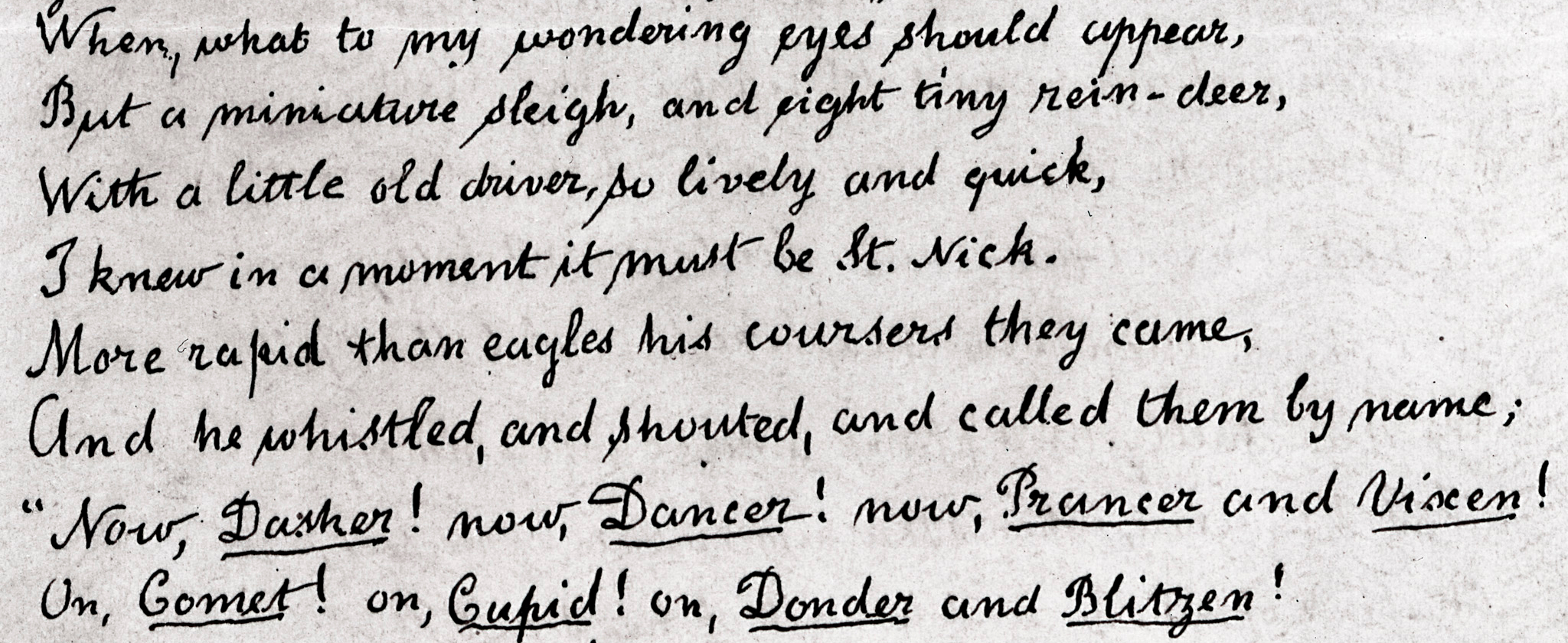
The eight reindeer, as they appeared in a handwritten manuscript of A Visit from St. Nicholas by Clement C. Moore from the 1860s

Moore altered the names of the last two reindeer several times; first to "Donder" and "Blitzen" (to match German Blitzen), as appears in his 1844 version of the poem. The relevant part reads:

More rapid than eagles his coursers they came,
And he whistled, and shouted, and called them by name;
"Now, Dasher! now, Dancer! now, Prancer and Vixen!
On, Comet! on, Cupid! on, Donder and Blitzen!
To the top of the porch! to the top of the wall!
Now dash away! dash away! dash away all!"

The modern German spelling of "Donner" started to become the standard spelling from the early 20th century, long after Moore's death, though a few examples from the 19th century are known. (Note: Uses of "Donner and Blitzen" are known from 1843, 1845, 1866, 1883, 1884, 1891, 1892, 1893, 1894, 1895, 1897, 1898, 1899, and 1900; and "Donner and Blixen" from 1850, 1857, 1881, 1884, 1895, and 1899.)

=== L. Frank Baum's ten reindeer ===
L. Frank Baum's story The Life and Adventures of Santa Claus (1902) includes a list of ten reindeer, none of which match those in A Visit from St. Nicholas. Santa's principal reindeer are Flossie and Glossie, and he gathers others named Racer and Pacer, Reckless and Speckless, Fearless and Peerless, and Ready and Steady.

=== Rudolph the Red-Nosed Reindeer ===
Rudolph's story was originally written in verse by Robert L. May for the Montgomery Ward chain of department stores in 1939, and it was published as a book to be given to children in the store at Christmas time. The 1949 Christmas song "Rudolph the Red-Nosed Reindeer" by Gene Autry further popularized the character.

The existence of Rudolph has inspired a number of less-enduring relatives, mostly in comedy settings, including an implied son named Robbie and a redneck cousin named Leroy, among others. Due to copyright and trademark complications, most unofficial productions that indirectly refer to Rudolph do so using euphemisms.

== Appearances in popular culture ==
- John C. Fleming's short story "A Costly Christmas" (1897) uses the names Slasher and Crasher, as well as Donner and Blitzen.
- Miracle on 34th Street (1947) features Santa Claus's eight reindeer from Clement Clarke Moore's 1823 Christmas-themed poem A Visit from St. Nicholas
- "Run Rudolph Run" (1958) is a Chuck Berry song about Rudolph the Red-Nosed Reindeer
- Prancer (1989) tells the story of a young girl who finds an injured reindeer
- Dasher and Dancer appear in the Walt Disney Animation Studios Christmas-themed television special Prep & Landing (2009), which also features a larger reindeer named Thrasher who leads the titular prep & landing team; in this universe, Rudolph does not exist
- "Hooves of Fire" (1999) centers around a later incarnation of the sleigh team after the retirement of "Ru"; Prancer and Blitzen remain by this point, and Ru's son Robbie is introduced in the special
- "Let's Go Dancing With Santa" (2015) is a KC & The Sunshine Band song about Santa Claus and his eight reindeer
- That Christmas (2024) features Dasher (voiced by Guz Khan) as Santa Claus's sidekick and talking reindeer

== See also ==
- Christmas Mountains
- "Dominick the Donkey"
- "Gouger, Tusker, Rooter, and Snouter", the flying hogs who pull the sled of Terry Pratchett's Hogfather
- "Tanngrisnir and Tanngnjóstr", the flying goats that pull Thor's chariot
- "Sleipnir", Odin's eight-legged horse
- "Moische, Herschel and Schlomo", the three donkeys that pull Hanukkah Harry's cart
