= Old Santeclaus with Much Delight =

Anonymous 1821 Christmas poem

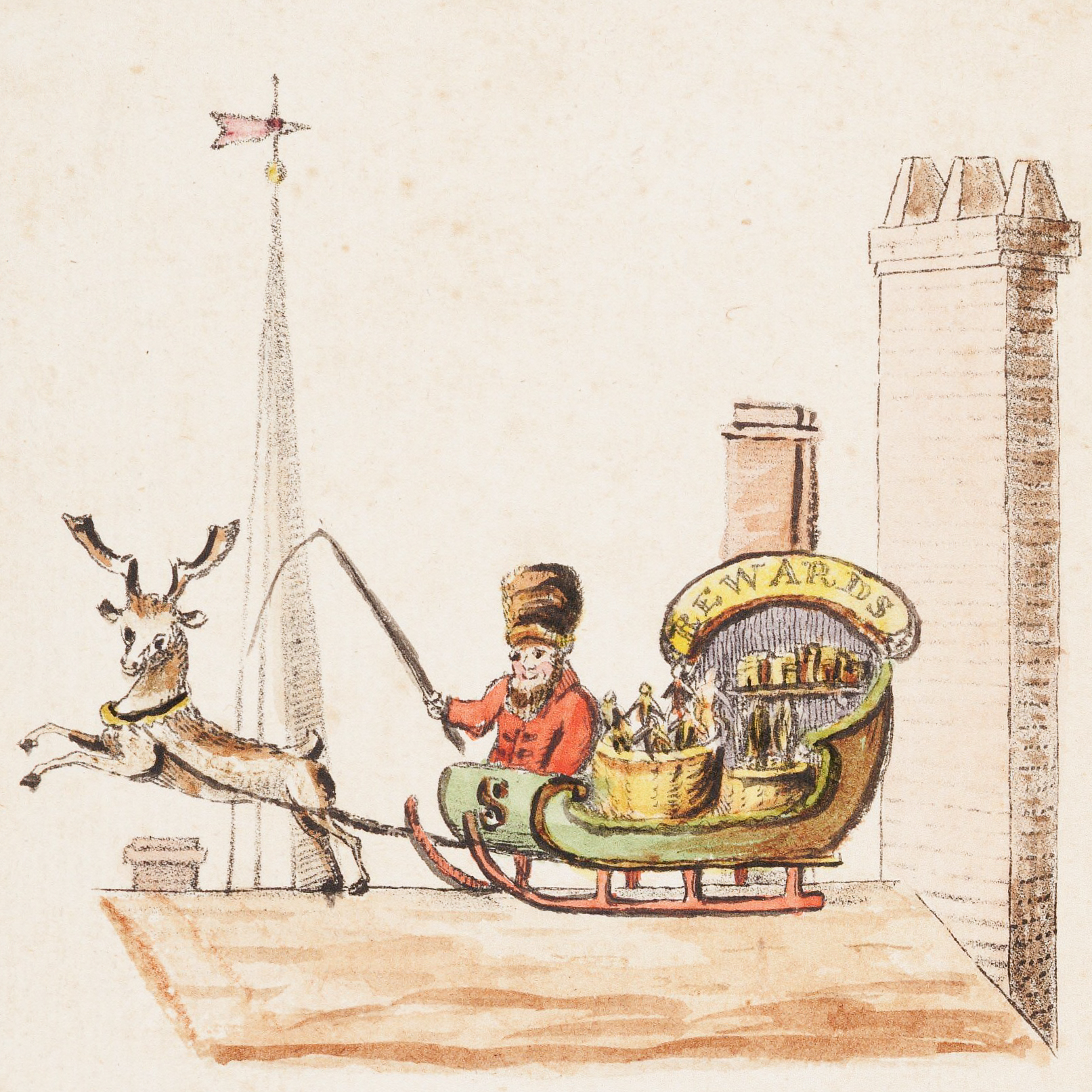
Illustration to verse 1

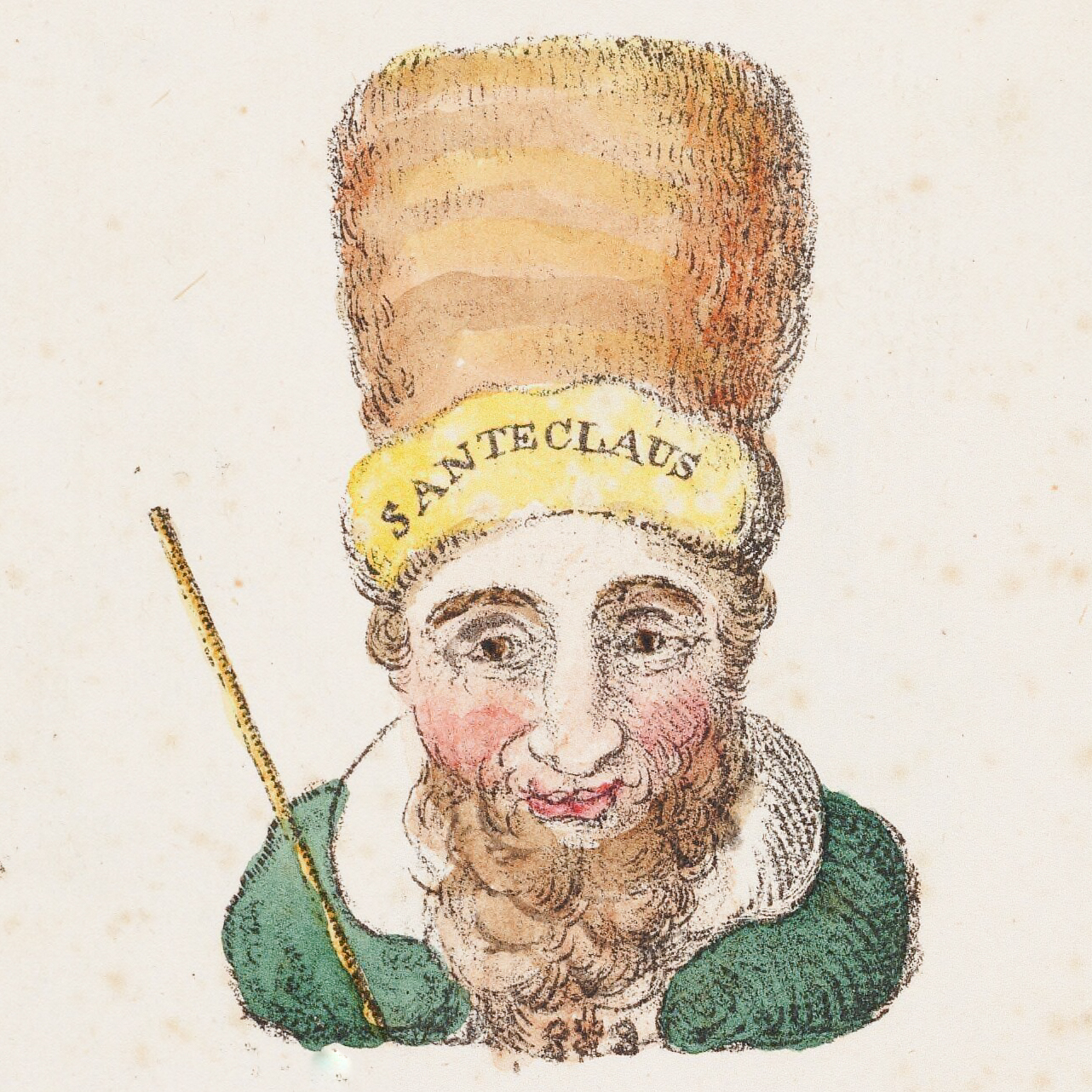
Illustration to verse 2

"Old Santeclaus with Much Delight" is an anonymous illustrated children's poem published in New York in 1821, predating by two years the first publication of "A Visit from St. Nicholas" ("Twas the Night before Christmas"). It is the first publication to mention (and illustrate) Santa Claus's reindeer and his sleigh, as well as being the first to describe his arrival on Christmas Eve. The accompanying illustrations are the earliest published artistic depictions of a Santa Claus figure.

== Publication ==
The poem, with eight colored engraved illustrations, was published in New York by William B. Gilley in 1821 as a small paperback book entitled The Children's Friend: A New-Year's Present, to the Little Ones from Five to Twelve. The names of the author and the illustrator are not known. The illustrations were reproduced lithographically, the first instance of lithography in the United States.

Published in the same city as Washington Irving's earlier portrait of Santa Claus in Knickerbocker's History of New York, the poem may have directly inspired another New Yorker, Clement Clarke Moore, to create the modern Santa in "'Twas the Night before Christmas".

== Development of the Santa Claus figure ==
Gilley's book includes some important elements in the early development of Santa Claus: his connection with the northern winter, the reindeer and sleigh, and his arrival on Christmas Eve rather than on 6 December (the traditional feast day of Saint Nicholas).

The accompanying engravings are the earliest images of a Santa figure. They show Santeclaus dressed in a red outfit and are the first reference to his being dressed in that color. Although red had been traditionally associated with bishop's robes, such as those that Saint Nicholas might have worn, the outfit shown is not that of a bishop, nor does it represent the old Dutch clothing of Saint Nicholas as described by Washington Irving and James Kirke Paulding.

Santeclaus brings presents only for "good" children, and in the first illustration they are explicitly called "rewards". "Naughty" children receive a "long, black, birchen rod" whose use for parental punishment is endorsed as a "command of God". The text refers to his sleigh's flight over chimney tops, and one of the illustrations depicts it on a roof.

== The poem ==
Old Santeclaus with much delight
His reindeer drives this frosty night,
O'r chimney tops, and tracts of snow,
To bring his yearly gifts to you.

The steady friend of virtuous youth,
The friend of duty, and of truth,
Each Christmas eve he joys to come
Where peace and love have made their home.

Through many houses he has been,
And various beds and stockings seen;
Some, white as snow, and neatly mended,
Others, that seemed for pigs intended.

To some I gave a pretty doll,
To some a peg-top, or a ball;
No crackers, cannons, squibs, or rockets,
To blow their eyes up, or their pockets.

Where e're I found good girls or boys,
That hated quarrels, strife and noise,
I left an apple, or a tart,
Or wooden gun, or painted cart;

No drums to stun their Mother's ear,
Nor swords to make their sisters fear;
But pretty books to store their mind
With knowledge of each various kind.

But where I found the children naughty,
In manners crude, in temper haughty,
Thankless to parents, liars, swearers,
Boxers, or cheats, or base tale-bearers,

I left a long, black, birchen rod,
Such as the dread command of God
Directs a Parent's hand to use
When virtue's path his sons refuse.

== Gallery ==
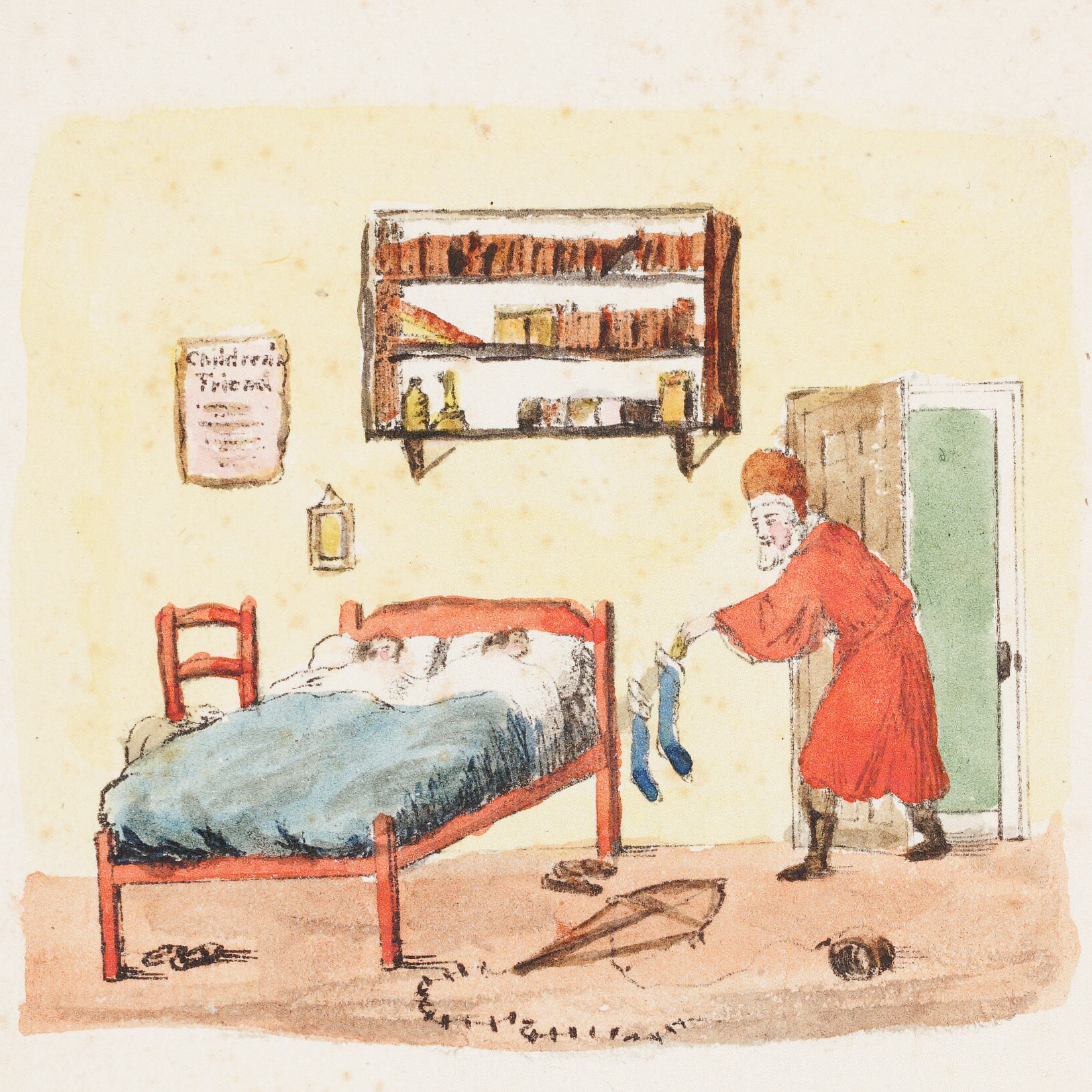
Illustration to verse 3

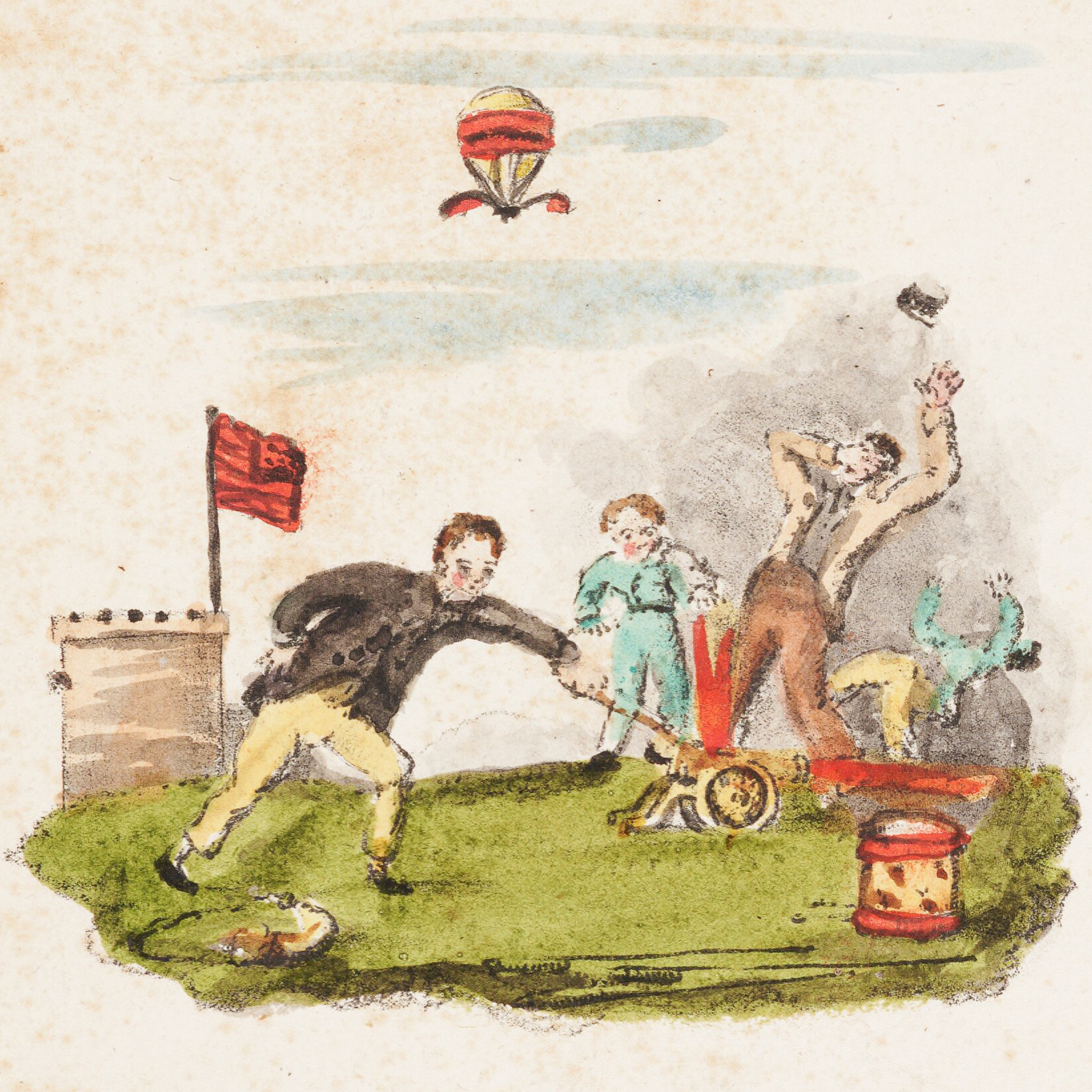
Illustration to verse 4

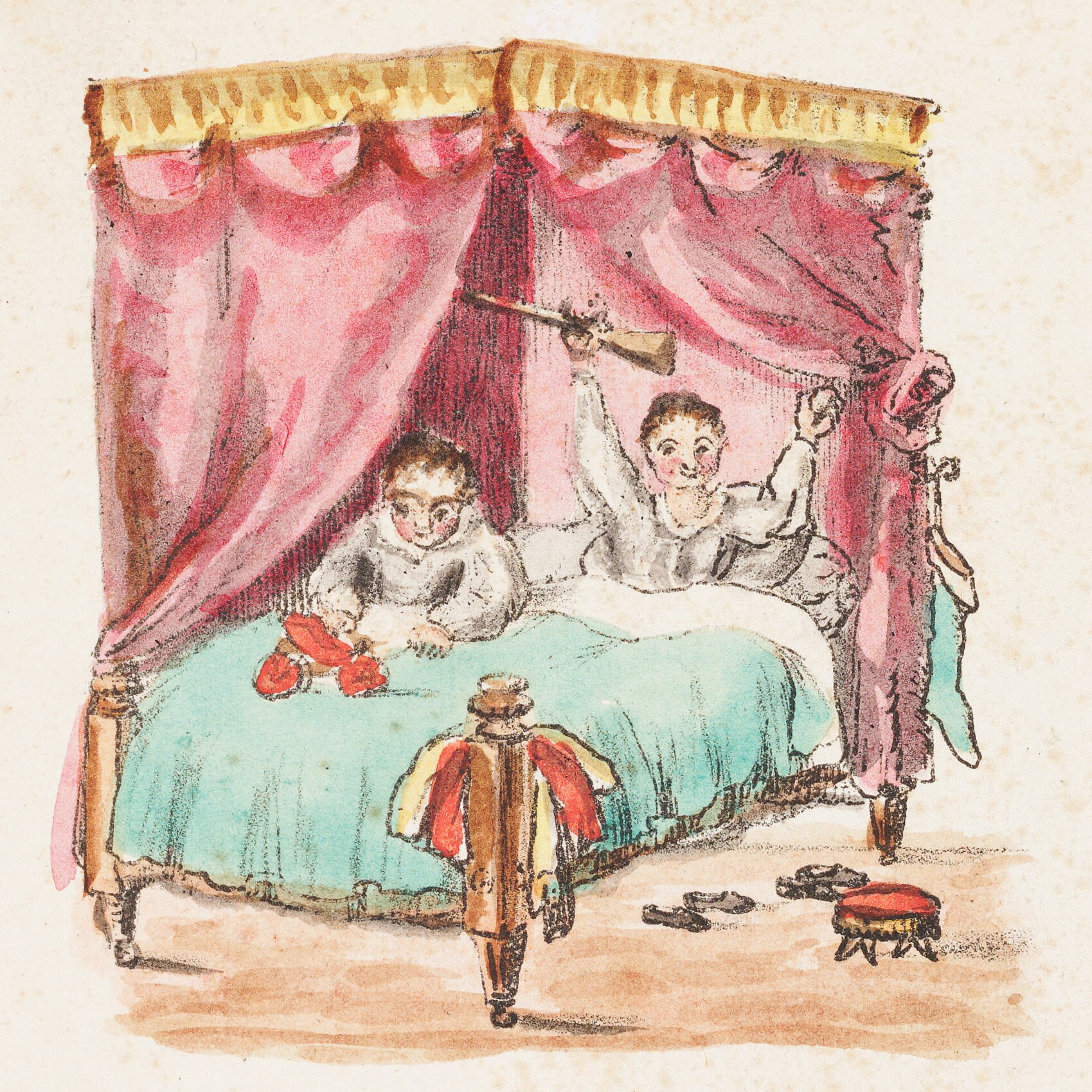
Illustration to verse 5

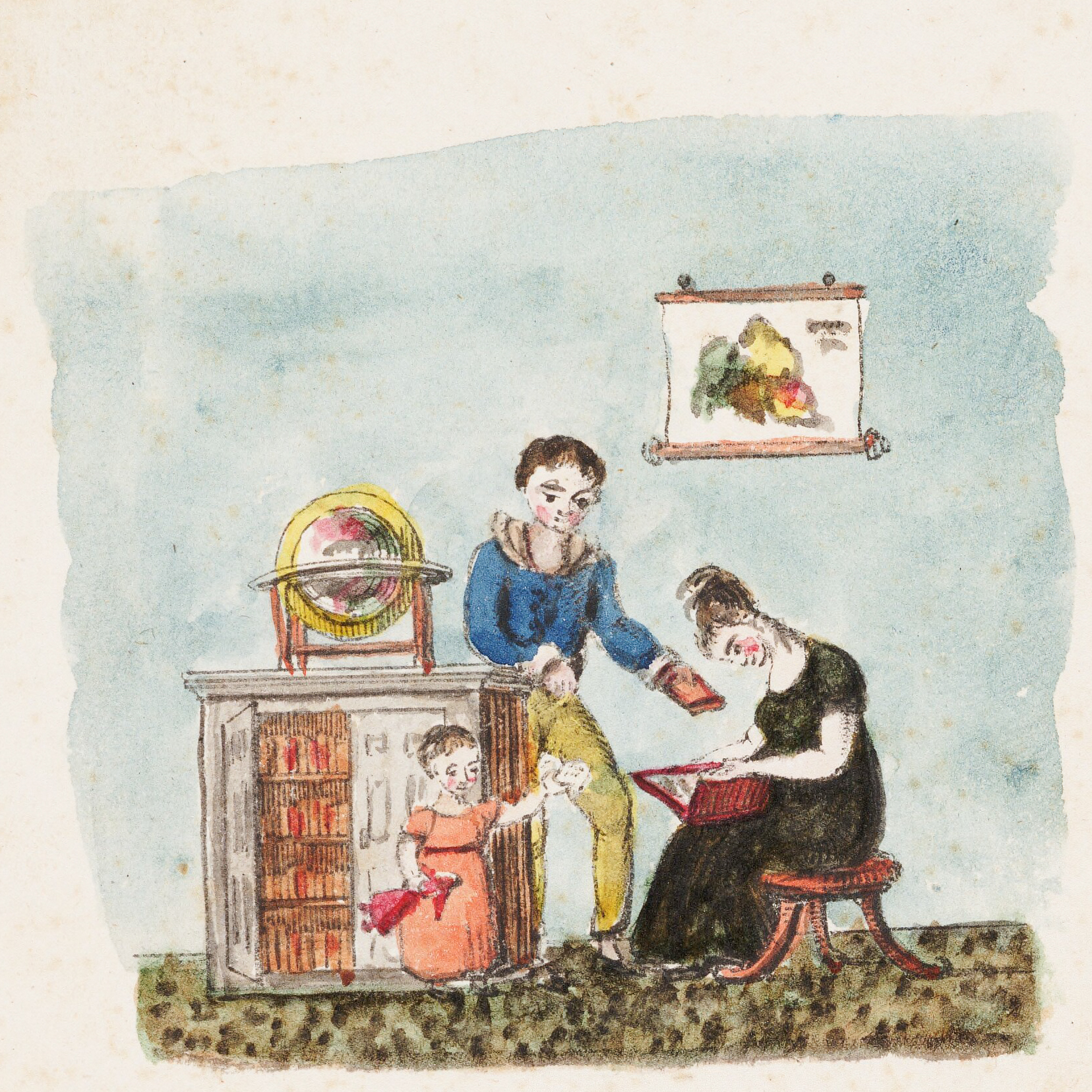
Illustration to verse 6

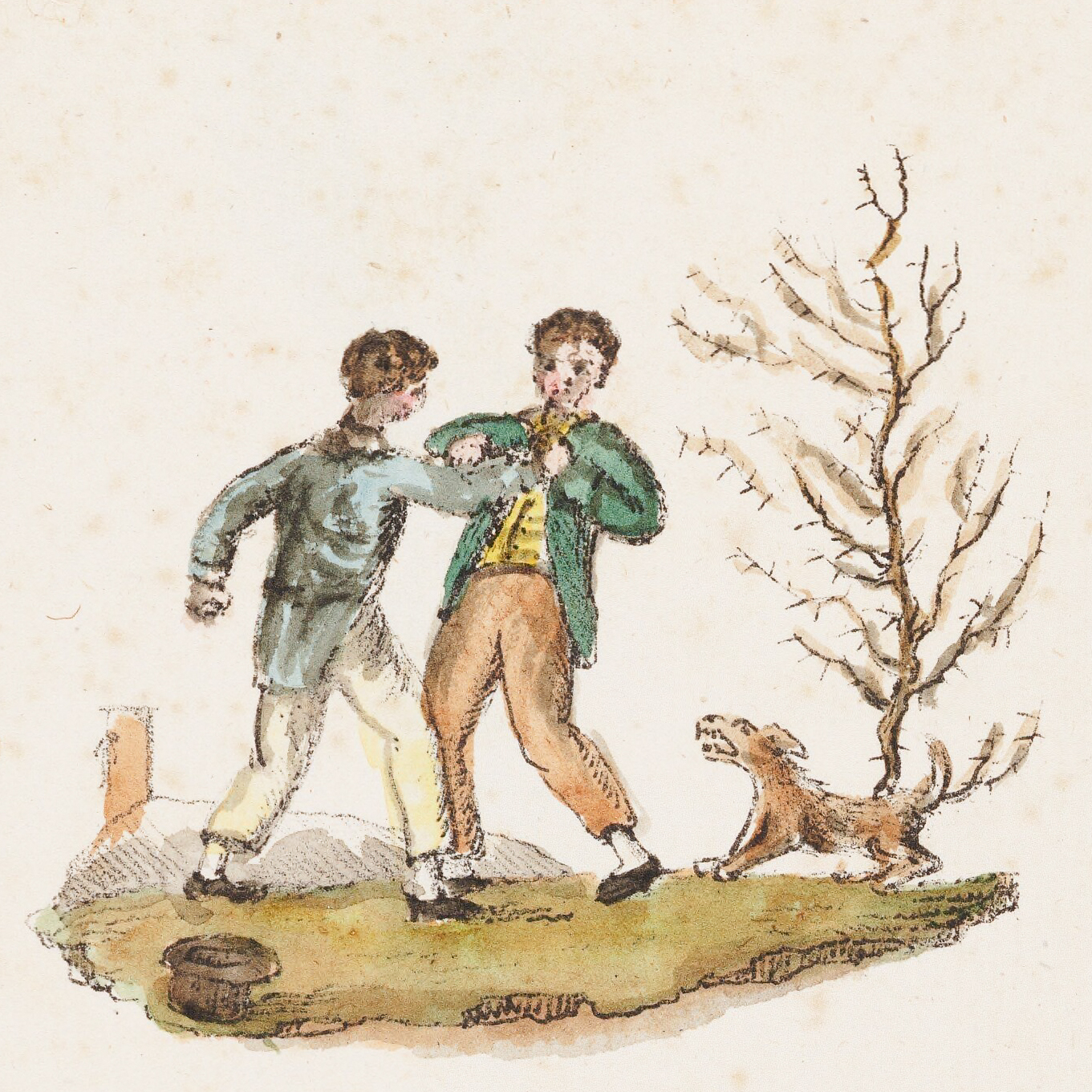
Illustration to verse 7

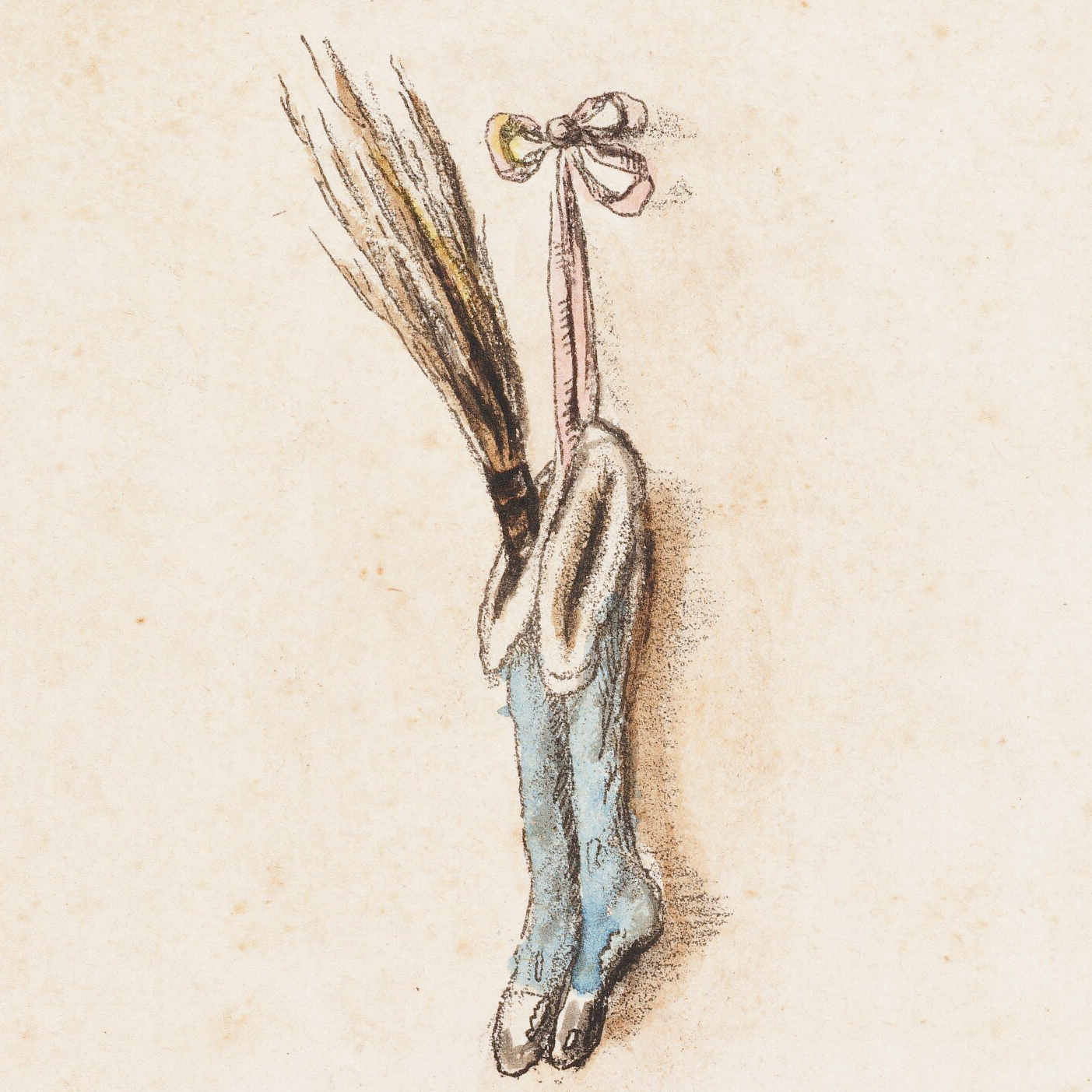
Illustration to verse 8

== See also ==
- List of Christmas-themed literature
