= Abassad =

Egyptian bishop and martyr

- Feast: December 23

Abassad was a bishop and martyr of the early Christian church. After being tortured, he was beheaded by the command of Arrianus under Diocletian. His feast day is December 23.

== Sources ==
- Holweck, F. G. A Biographical Dictionary of the Saints. St. Louis, MO: B. Herder Book Co. 1924.
