= Prancer (film) =

1989 film by John D. Hancock

- Theatrical release poster
- Directed by: John Hancock
- Written by: Greg Taylor
- Produced by: Raffaella De Laurentiis
- Starring: Sam Elliott; Rebecca Harrell; Cloris Leachman; Abe Vigoda; Michael Constantine; Rutanya Alda; Ariana Richards; John Joseph Duda
- Cinematography: Misha Suslov
- Edited by: Dennis M. O'Connor; John Rosenberg
- Music by: Maurice Jarre
- Production companies: Nelson Entertainment; Cineplex Odeon Films
- Distributed by: Orion Pictures
- Release date: November 17, 1989
- Running time: 103 minutes
- Countries: United States; Canada
- Language: English
- Budget: $7 million
- Box office: $18.6 million

Prancer is a 1989 Christmas fantasy drama film directed by John Hancock, written by Greg Taylor, and starring Rebecca Harrell, Sam Elliott, Cloris Leachman, Abe Vigoda, Rutanya Alda, John Joseph Duda, and Ariana Richards. The plot follows a young girl who finds a reindeer she believes is Prancer, one of Santa Claus’s fabled helpers. The film was a modest box office success and earned mixed to positive reviews.

It is set in Three Oaks, Michigan, where town exteriors were filmed. Filming also occurred at the Old Republic House in New Carlisle, Indiana, La Porte, Indiana, and at Starved Rock State Park in Utica, Illinois.

The film was followed by a direct-to-video sequel called Prancer Returns, released by USA Home Entertainment in 2001. In 2022, Universal Pictures Home Entertainment released a remake called Prancer: A Christmas Tale.

== Plot ==
Eight-year-old Jessica Riggs and her older brother, Steve, are being raised by their widowed father, John. Their apple farm has fallen on hard times, with John being helped by his sister-in-law, Sarah.

While walking home after a school Christmas pageant, Jessica and her best friend, Carol, witness a plastic reindeer fall from a Christmas decoration hung above the main street in town. Jessica concludes it was Prancer from the order given in the poem A Visit from St. Nicholas (a.k.a. The Night Before Christmas).

Afraid he will be unable to provide for Jessica, John discusses a plan for Sarah to take her in to raise temporarily, which Jessica partially overhears. She and Carol go sledding and knock down some flowers at a house owned by reclusive widow Mrs. McFarland. While walking home, Jessica encounters a live reindeer in the woods. He runs away, disappearing into the darkness. At school, she tells Carol, who doesn't believe her and expresses doubt in the existence of Santa Claus, God, and heaven, upsetting Jessica, who declares that they are not friends anymore. Later, while walking home from school, Jessica finds the reindeer’s tracks and follows them into the woods. John eventually finds her and brings her into his truck but almost hits the reindeer, who is standing in the road. Noticing the reindeer is wounded, John grabs his rifle, intending to shoot. As Jessica pleads for him not to do so, the reindeer disappears.

Later while dreaming of Prancer, Jessica is startled awake by the scene of the plastic reindeer falling from earlier. She hears a noise and sees the door to the barn is open. Investigating, she finds the reindeer is now inside among the other animals. Afraid John will find him, she moves him to a shed. Certain he is the real Prancer, she takes it upon herself to nurse him back to health. She calls a veterinarian, Dr. Orel Benton, who comes over to tend to him.

Jessica later tells a mall Santa that she has Prancer and gives him a Polaroid picture and letter to give to the real Santa before Christmas Eve. He takes them to the editor of the local newspaper. Jessica shows Prancer to Carol, and Steve walks in the barn as well. Eventually, she apologizes to Mrs. McFarland for knocking down her flowers and asks her if she can have a job to help raise money to buy oats for Prancer. Mrs. McFarland agrees to pay her to clean a room in her house, and they become friends. The newspaper editor, inspired by Jessica's faith, writes an article which is then read by the local pastor during his sermon.

Meanwhile, John discovers Prancer has escaped from the barn and let all the other animals out. While he tries to round them up, Prancer goes inside the house and wreaks havoc. Townspeople converge on the farm, wanting to see Prancer. John grabs his rifle, threatening to shoot him, when a local butcher stops him, offering to buy Prancer. The butcher keeps him as a sales gimmick for his Christmas tree lot. Jessica, afraid he will kill Prancer, runs away in the snowy night determined to rescue him. Steve runs after her and decides to help her free Prancer. While he tries to break the lock open, she climbs to the top of Prancer's cage, intent on letting him fly out. She attempts to open the cage but falls, injuring her head.

Jessica stays in her bedroom, becoming despondent. John goes to her, and she asks him to read a passage from "Yes, Virginia, there is a Santa Claus". He tells her that while he could bear losing the farm, it would kill him to lose her. He changes his mind about sending her away to Sarah. He suggests they take Prancer to Antler Ridge, which would be the perfect place for Santa to pick him up. Prancer is taken to Antler Ridge, where he runs out of sight. Following his tracks, John and Jessica notice they vanish at the edge of a cliff. A faint sound of sleigh bells can be heard, and a streak of light is seen rising to meet Santa's sleigh. Jessica bids Prancer farewell and to always remember her. The sleigh flies across the full moon and over the town toward the Riggs farm—its first stop.

== Cast ==
- Sam Elliott as John Riggs
- Rebecca Harrell as Jessica Riggs
- John Joseph Duda as Steve Riggs
- Cloris Leachman as Mrs. McFarland
- Abe Vigoda as Dr. Orel Benton
- Michael Constantine as Mr. Stewart/Mall Santa
- Rutanya Alda as Sarah
- Ariana Richards as Carol Wetherby
- Johnny Galecki as Billy Quinn
- Mark Rolston as Herb Drier
- Walter Charles as Minister
- Michael Luciano as Bert
- Jesse Bradford as Boy #1
- Sandra Olson as Town woman
- Dan Atherton as Town man
- Boo as Prancer
- Marcia Porter as Mrs. Fairburn
- Frank Welker as Prancer (vocal effects; uncredited)

== Release ==
=== Critical reception ===
The film received mixed to positive reviews from critics. It holds a 68% rating on the review aggregator website Rotten Tomatoes based on 28 reviews, with an average rating of 6/10. The critical consensus reads, "Prancer's good-natured holiday cheer – and a terrific performance from its young star – are enough to make this yuletide adventure a moderately rewarding watch."

The film's young lead actress, Rebecca Harrell, garnered a nomination for a Young Artist Award for Best Young Actress Starring in a Motion Picture for her performance, but lost to 17-year-old Winona Ryder for her role in Great Balls of Fire!.

Movie critic Roger Ebert gave the film 3 stars of a possible 4, saying the concept might seem cloying and sentimental at first glance. Yet Hancock’s direction of the clever script, and good performances from skilled actors, made Prancer engaging for both adults and children. He also highlighted Harrell's performance, saying:

And what really redeems the movie, taking it out of the category of kiddie picture and giving it a heart and gumption, is the performance by a young actress named Rebecca Harrell, as Jessica. She's something. She has a troublemaker's look in her eye, and a round, pixie face that's filled with mischief. And she's smart – a plucky schemer who figures out things for herself and isn't afraid to act on her convictions.

=== Home media ===
The film was released on DVD by MGM Home Video with several re-packagings in 2003 and 2004, and a newer release on October 7, 2014.

== Reindeer ==
The reindeer used for the film was a pregnant reindeer named Boo. Pregnant reindeer keep their antlers for longer, and she was needed so she wouldn't shed hers before filming was over in late winter. She was selected for her rapport with Rebecca Harrell. She was at the premiere of the film on November 17, 1989.

== Songs ==
- "O Little Town of Bethlehem"
- "Silent Night"
- "We Wish You a Merry Christmas"
- "Hark! The Herald Angels Sing"
- "How Great Thou Art"
- "O Tannenbaum"

== See also ==
- List of Christmas films
- Santa Claus's reindeer
