= Troy Sentinel =

Semi-weekly newspaper

The Troy Sentinel was a semi-weekly newspaper published between 1823 and 1832, which served Rensselaer County, New York in Upstate New York. The newspaper was headquartered at 225 River Street in historic downtown Troy, New York.

== History ==
The newspaper is known for being the first to publish the poem "A Visit from St. Nicholas", also known as "The Night Before Christmas" and "Twas the Night Before Christmas. The poem, generally attributed to Clement Clarke Moore, was published anonymously by the Troy Sentinel on December 23, 1823.

In July 2012, Gramercy Communications moved their corporate offices into the former home of the Troy Sentinel. The company paid a grant to Troy Public Library to digitize the full collection of the newspaper.
