= Guy Beaulne =

Canadian actor and theatre director (1921–2001)

- Born: 23 December 1921; Ottawa, Ontario
- Died: 1 October 2001 (aged 79); Montreal, Quebec
- Occupation(s): actor and theatre director
- Awards: Order of Canada; National Order of Quebec

Guy Beaulne, CM CQ FRSC (23 December 1921 – 1 October 2001) was a French Canadian actor and theatre director.

Born in Ottawa, Ontario, he received a Bachelor of Arts and Bachelor of Philosophy from the University of Ottawa. He also had a Normal School Teacher Diploma.

In 1953, he directed the Quebec television series, La famille Plouffe. From 1970 to 1976, he was the Director of the Grand Théâtre de Québec.

== Honours ==
- In 1967, he was awarded the Canadian Centennial Medal.
- In 1972, he was made a Fellow of the Royal Society of Canada.
- In 1975, he was made a Member of the Order of Canada "in recognition of his contribution to the development of theatre in Canada".
- In 1992, he was awarded the 125th Anniversary of the Confederation of Canada Medal.
- In 1993, he was made a Knight of the National Order of Quebec.
