= A Visit from St. Nicholas =

1823 Christmas poem

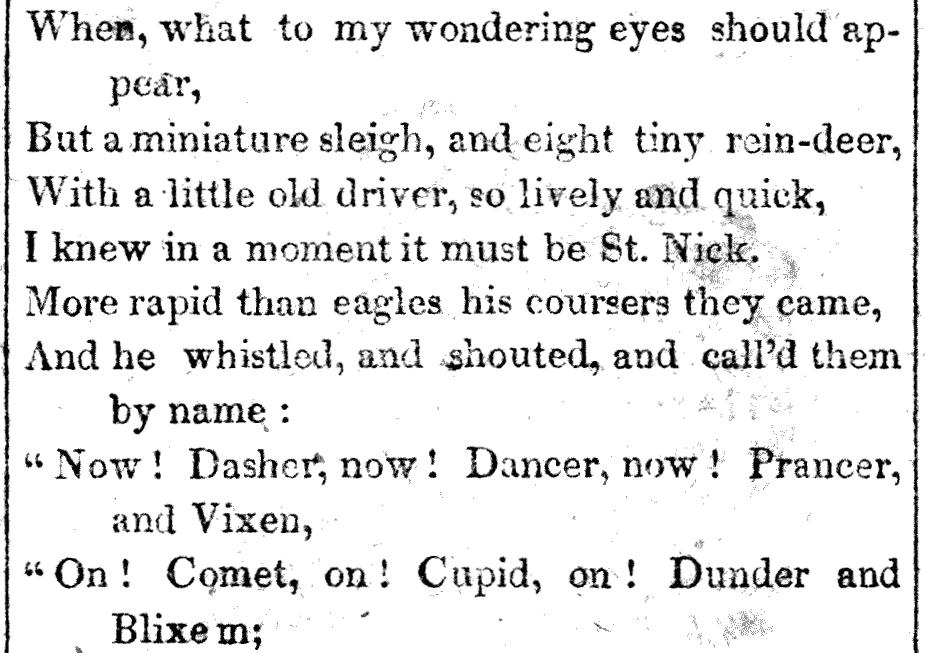
- Text from the original publication of the poem in the Troy Sentinel, with the spellings "Dunder" and "Blixem".
- Original title: Account of a Visit from St. Nicholas
- Written: 1823
- Country: United States
- Language: English
- Subject(s): Santa Claus, Christmas
- Genre: Children's poetry
- Meter: Anapestic tetrameter
- Rhyme scheme: Couplets
- Publisher: Troy Sentinel
- Publication date: December 23, 1823
- Media type: Newspaper
- Lines: 56

Full text
- A Visit from St. Nicholas at Wikisource

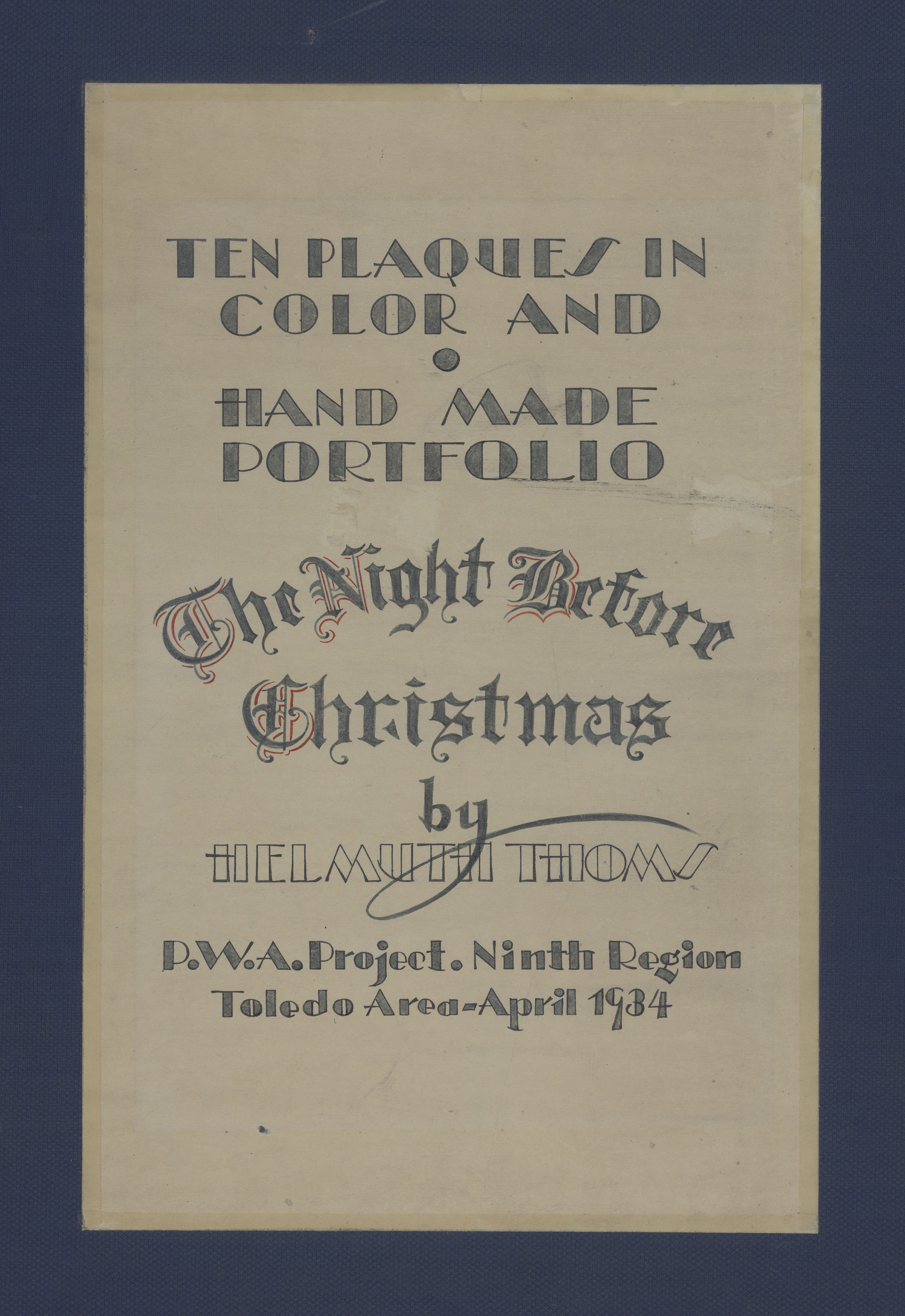
The cover of a series of illustrations for the "Night Before Christmas", published as part of the Public Works Administration project in 1934 by Helmuth F. Thoms

"A Visit from St. Nicholas" (often called "The Night Before Christmas" and "'Twas the Night Before Christmas", from its first line) is a poem, first published anonymously under the title "Account of a Visit from St. Nicholas", in 1823. Authorship has been attributed to Clement Clarke Moore, who claimed authorship in 1837; but it has also been suggested that Henry Livingston Jr. wrote it.

The poem has been called "arguably the best-known verses ever written by an American" and is largely responsible for some of the conceptions of Santa Claus from the mid-19th century to today. It has had a massive effect on the history of Christmas gift-giving. Before the poem gained wide popularity, American ideas had varied considerably about Saint Nicholas and other Christmastide visitors. "A Visit from St. Nicholas" was later set to music and has been recorded by several artists.

== Plot ==
On the night of Christmas Eve, a family is settling down to sleep, when the father is awakened by noises on their lawn. Looking out the window, he sees Santa Claus, also known as Saint Nicholas, in a sleigh pulled by eight reindeer.

After landing his sleigh on the roof, Santa bounds down the chimney. He carries a sack of toys, and the father watches his visitor deliver presents and fill the stockings hanging by the fireplace, and laughs to himself. They share a conspiratorial moment before Santa bounds up the chimney again. As he flies away, Santa calls out "Happy Christmas to all, and to all a good night."

== History ==
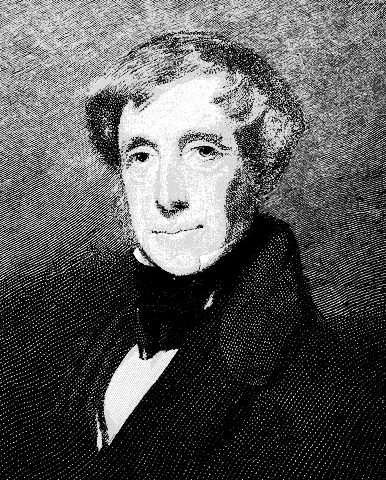
Clement Clarke Moore, author of "Account of a Visit from St. Nicholas"

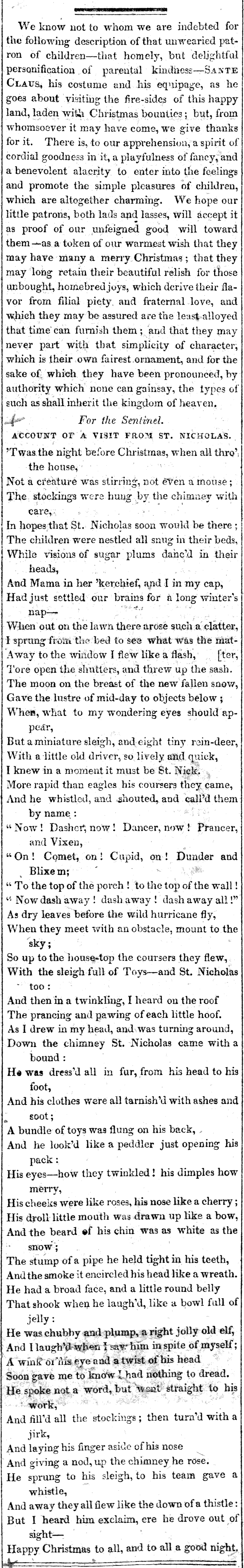
The original publication of "Account of a Visit from St. Nicholas" in the Troy Sentinel, December 23, 1823

The authorship of A Visit is credited to Clement Clarke Moore who is said to have composed it on a snowy winter's day during a shopping trip on a sleigh. His inspiration for the character of Saint Nicholas was a local Dutch handyman as well as the historic Saint Nicholas.

Moore originated many of the features that are still associated with Santa Claus today while borrowing other aspects, such as the use of reindeer. The poem was first published anonymously in the Troy, New York Sentinel on December 23, 1823, having been sent there by a friend of Moore, and was reprinted frequently thereafter with no name attached. It was first attributed in print to Moore in 1837.

In 1842, the noted poet and editor William Cullen Bryant credited Moore as the author when he included the piece in an anthology of American poetry he had compiled. Moore himself acknowledged authorship when he included it in his own book of poems in 1844. By then, the original publisher and at least seven others had already acknowledged his authorship. Moore had a reputation as an erudite professor and had not wished at first to be connected with the unscholarly verse. He included it in the anthology at the insistence of his children, for whom he had originally written the piece.

Moore's conception of Saint Nicholas was borrowed from his friend Washington Irving, but Moore portrayed his "jolly old elf" as arriving on Christmas Eve rather than Christmas Day. At the time that Moore wrote the poem, Christmas Day was overtaking New Year's Day as the preferred genteel family holiday of the season, but some Protestants viewed Christmas as the result of "Catholic ignorance and deception" and still had reservations. By having Saint Nicholas arrive the night before, Moore "deftly shifted the focus away from Christmas Day with its still-problematic religious associations". As a result, "New Yorkers embraced Moore's child-centered version of Christmas as if they had been doing it all their lives."

In An American Anthology, 1787–1900, editor Edmund Clarence Stedman reprinted the Moore version of the poem, including the Dutch spelling of "Donder" and German spelling of "Blitzen" that he adopted, rather than the version from 1823 "Dunder and Blixem" that is more similar to the old Dutch "Donder en Blixem" that translates to "Thunder and Lightning".

=== Authorship controversy ===
Moore's connection with the poem has been questioned by Professor Donald Foster, who used textual content analysis and external evidence to argue that Moore could not have been the author. Foster believes that Major Henry Livingston Jr., a New Yorker with Dutch and Scottish roots, should be considered the chief candidate for authorship, a view long espoused by the Livingston family. Livingston was distantly related to Moore's wife.

Foster's claim, however, has been countered by document dealer and historian Seth Kaller, who once owned one of Moore's original manuscripts of the poem. Kaller has offered a point-by-point rebuttal of both Foster's linguistic analysis and external findings, buttressed by the work of autograph expert James Lowe and Joe Nickell, author of Pen, Ink and Evidence.

==== Evidence in favor of Moore ====
On January 20, 1829, Troy editor Orville L. Holley alluded to the author of the Christmas poem, using terms that accurately described Moore as a native and current resident of New York City, and as "a gentleman of more merit as a scholar and a writer than many of more noisy pretensions". In December 1833, a diary entry by Francis P. Lee, a student at General Theological Seminary when Moore taught there, referred to a holiday figure of St. Nicholas as being "robed in fur, and dressed according to the description of Prof. Moore in his poem".

Four poems including A Visit from St. Nicholas appeared under Moore's name in The New-York Book of Poetry, edited by Charles Fenno Hoffman (New York: George Dearborn, 1837). The Christmas poem appears on pp. 217–19, credited to "Clement C. Moore". Moore stated in a letter to the editor of the New York American (published on March 1, 1844) that he "gave the publisher" of The New-York Book of Poetry "several pieces, among which was the 'Visit from St. Nicholas.'" Admitting that he wrote it "not for publication, but to amuse my children," Moore claimed the Christmas poem in this 1844 letter as his "literary property, however small the intrinsic value of that property may be".

"A Visit from St. Nicholas" appears on pp. 124–27 in Moore's volume of collected Poems (New York: Bartlett and Welford, 1844). Prior to 1844, the poem was included in two 1840 anthologies, attributed to "Clement C. Moore" in Selections from The American Poets, edited by William Cullen Bryant (New York: Harper & Brothers, 1840), pp. 285–86; and to "C. C. Moore" in the first volume of The Poets of America, edited by John Keese (New York: S. Colman, 1840), pp. 102–04. The New-York Historical Society has a later manuscript of the poem in Moore's handwriting, forwarded by T. W. C. Moore along with a cover letter dated March 15, 1862, giving circumstances of the poem's original composition and transmission after a personal "interview" with Clement C. Moore.

After "A Visit from St. Nicholas" appeared under Moore's name in the 1837 New-York Book of Poetry, newspaper printings of the poem often credited Moore as the author. For example, the poem is credited to "Professor Moore" in the December 25, 1837 Pennsylvania Inquirer and Daily Courier. Although Moore did not authorize the earliest publication of the poem in the Troy Sentinel, he had close ties to Troy through the Protestant Episcopal Church that could explain how it got there. Harriet Butler of Troy, New York (daughter of the Rev. David Butler) who allegedly showed the poem to Sentinel editor Orville L. Holley, was a family friend of Moore's and possibly a distant relative. A letter to Moore from the publisher Norman Tuttle states, "I understand from Mr. Holley that he received it from Mrs. Sackett, the wife of Mr. Daniel Sackett who was then a merchant in this city".

The reported involvement of two women, Harriet Butler and Sarah Sackett, as intermediaries is consistent with the 1862 account of the poem's earliest transmission in which T. W. C. Moore describes two stages of copying, first "by a relative of Dr Moores in her Album" and second, "by a friend of hers, from Troy". Moore preferred to be known for his more scholarly works, but allowed the poem to be included in his anthology in 1844 at the request of his children.

By that time, the original publisher and at least seven others had already acknowledged his authorship. Livingston family lore gives credit to their forebear rather than Moore, but there is no proof that Livingston himself ever claimed authorship, nor has any record ever been found of any printing of the poem with Livingston's name attached to it, despite more than 40 years of searches.

While textual analyses by English scholars have pointed to Livingston as the likelier author, subsequent tests using forensic linguistics techniques developed by computer scientists have come to the opposite conclusion. In his 2023 book The Fight for "The Night": Resolving the Authorship Dispute over "The Night Before Christmas," retired litigator Tom A. Jerman reported using Duquesne University computer scientist Patrick Juola's Java Graphical Authorship Attribution Program to compare the poem to the works of Moore and Livingston, with 16 of 17 tests pointing to Moore as the likelier author. Also that year, computer scientist Shlomo Argamon, then of the Illinois Institute of Technology, analyzed the poem alongside texts from Moore, Livingston and five other authors of the era and concluded that “Moore is much more likely to be the author than Livingston,” and “it’s more likely authored by either Moore or Livingston than any of the other guys.”

==== Evidence in favor of Livingston ====
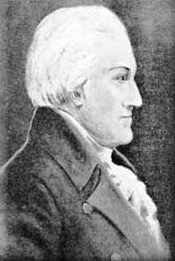
Some contend that Henry Livingston Jr., not Moore, was the poem's author.

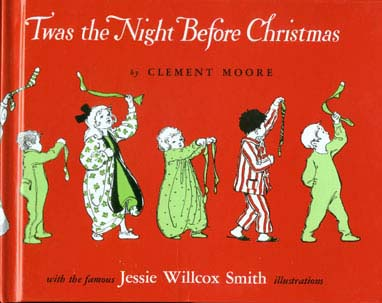
Cover of a 1912 edition of the poem, illustrated by Jessie Willcox Smith

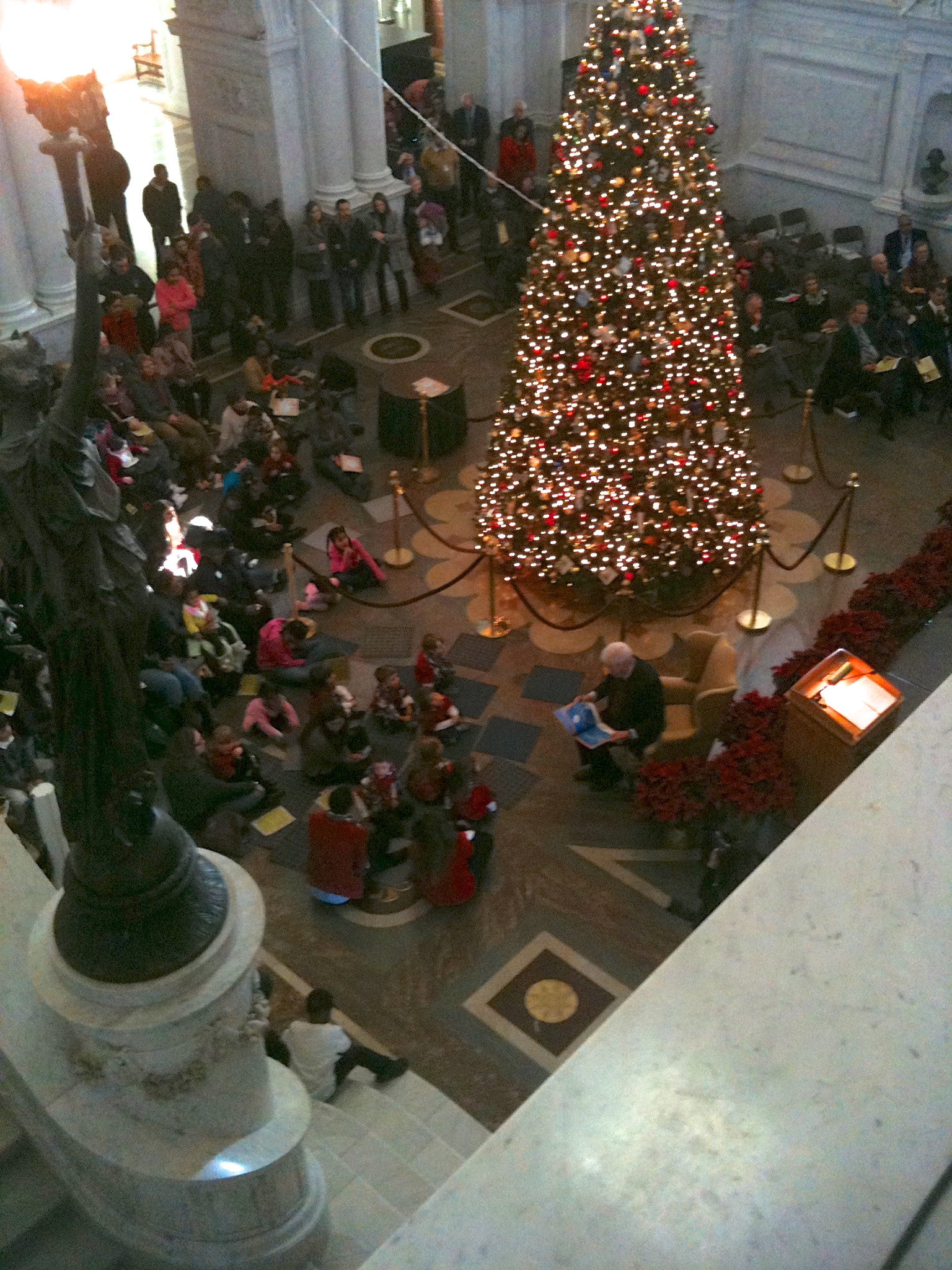
The Librarian of Congress, James Hadley Billington, reads the poem to children in December 2010

Advocates for Livingston's authorship argue that Moore "tried at first to disavow" the poem. They also posit that Moore falsely claimed to have translated a book. Document dealer and historian Seth Kaller has challenged both claims. Kaller examined the book in question, A Complete Treatise on Merinos and Other Sheep, as well as many letters signed by Moore, and found that the "signature" was not penned by Moore, and thus provides no evidence that Moore made any plagiaristic claim. Kaller's findings were confirmed by autograph expert James Lowe, by Dr. Joe Nickell, the author of Pen, Ink & Evidence, and by others. According to Kaller, Moore's name was likely written on the book by a New-York Historical Society cataloger to indicate that it had been a gift from Moore to the Society.

The following points have been advanced in order to credit the poem to Major Henry Livingston Jr.:

Livingston also wrote poetry primarily using an anapaestic metrical scheme, and it is claimed that some of the phraseology of "A Visit" is consistent with other poems by Livingston, and that Livingston's poetry is more optimistic than Moore's poetry published in his own name. But Stephen Nissenbaum argues in Battle for Christmas that the poem could have been a social satire of the Victorianization of Christmas. Kaller claims that Foster cherry-picked only the poems that fit his thesis and that many of Moore's unpublished works have a tenor, phraseology, and meter similar to "A Visit". Moore had even written a letter titled "From Saint Nicholas" that may have predated 1823.

Foster also contends that Moore hated tobacco and would, therefore, never have depicted Saint Nicholas with a pipe. However, Kaller notes, the source of evidence for Moore's supposed disapproval of tobacco is The Wine Drinker, another poem by him. In actuality, that verse contradicts such a claim. Moore's The Wine Drinker criticizes self-righteous, hypocritical advocates of temperance who secretly indulge in the substances which they publicly oppose, and supports the social use of tobacco in moderation and wine and opium, which was more acceptable then than now.

Foster also asserts that Livingston's mother was Dutch, which accounts for the references to the Dutch Sinteklaes tradition and the use of the Dutch names "Dunder and Blixem". Against this claim, it is suggested by Kaller that Moore – a friend of writer Washington Irving and member of the same literary society – may have acquired some of his knowledge of New York Dutch traditions from Irving. Irving had written A History of New York in 1809 under the name of "Dietrich Knickerbocker". It includes several references to legends of Saint Nicholas, including the following that bears a close relationship to the poem:

And the sage Oloffe dreamed a dream,‍—‌and lo, the good St. Nicholas came riding over the tops of the trees, in that self-same wagon wherein he brings his yearly presents to children, and he descended hard by where the heroes of Communipaw had made their late repast. And he lit his pipe by the fire, and sat himself down and smoked; and as he smoked, the smoke from his pipe ascended into the air and spread like a cloud overhead. And Oloffe bethought him, and he hastened and climbed up to the top of one of the tallest trees, and saw that the smoke spread over a great extent of country; and as he considered it more attentively, he fancied that the great volume of smoke assumed a variety of marvelous forms, where in dim obscurity he saw shadowed out palaces and domes and lofty spires, all of which lasted but a moment, and then faded away, until the whole rolled off, and nothing but the green woods were left. And when St. Nicholas had smoked his pipe, he twisted it in his hatband, and laying his finger beside his nose, gave the astonished Van Kortlandt a very significant look; then, mounting his wagon, he returned over the tree-tops and disappeared.

— Washington Irving, A History of New York, 1809 [1868]

MacDonald P. Jackson, a professor emeritus at the University of Auckland and a fellow at the Royal Society of New Zealand, authored a book in 2016, Who Wrote "The Night Before Christmas"?: Analyzing the Clement Clarke Moore Vs. Henry Livingston Question, in which he evaluates the opposing arguments, using author-attribution techniques of modern computational stylistics to examine the long-standing controversy. Employing a range of tests, including a statistical analysis of phonemes, Jackson contends that Livingston authored the classic poem.

== Musical adaptations ==
Parts of the poem have been set to music numerous times, including a bowdlerized version (that omitted several verses such as "The moon on the breast of the new fallen snow ... etc.". and rewrote and replaced many others such as "the prancing and pawing of each little hoof" with "the clattering noise of each galloping hoof"), by the American composer Ken Darby (1909–1992), whose version was recorded by Fred Waring and the Pennsylvanians three separate times; in 1942, 1955, and 1963. The latter 1963 stereo recording for Capitol Records became the most familiar of the poem's musical adaptations. Christmas song-writing specialist Johnny Marks also composed a short version in 1952, titled "The Night Before Christmas Song", which has been recorded multiple times. It was also arranged for choir by Lee Kjelson and Margaret Shelley Vance. The poem was also set to music by British child composer Alma Deutscher (b. 2005). In 1953, Perry Como recorded a recitation of the poem for RCA Victor with background music arranged and conducted by Mitchell Ayres. Louis Armstrong recited the poem in a March 1971 recording made only four months before his death. It was recorded at his home in Corona, Queens and released as 45 rpm by Continental Records.

Jo Stafford recorded a version of "'Twas The Night Before Christmas" as part of her 1955 album Happy Holiday.

The first completely musical rendition, that used the text of the poem in its entirety without material additions or alterations, was the cantata "A Visit from St. Nicholas" composed by Lucian W. Dressel in 1992 and first performed by the Webster University Orchestra, SATB Soloists, and Chorus. More recent performances of the cantata have been performed by regional orchestras and choruses in Missouri, Illinois and Colorado.

== Original copies ==
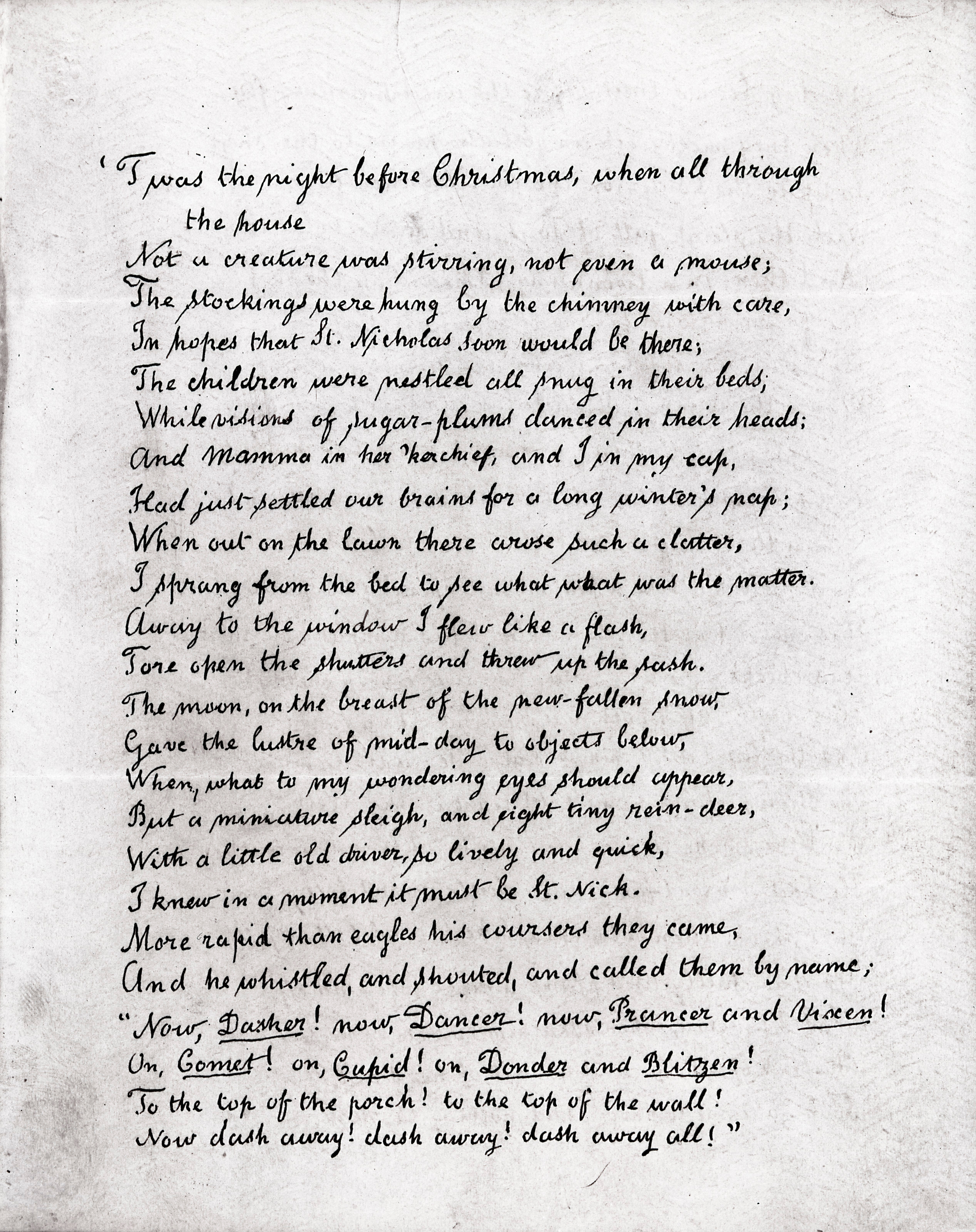
Copy of the poem hand-written by Clement Clarke Moore

Four hand-written copies of the poem are known to exist and three are in museums, including the New-York Historical Society library. The fourth copy, written out and signed by Clement Clarke Moore as a gift to a friend in 1860, was sold by one private collector to another in December 2006. It was purchased for $280,000 by an unnamed "chief executive officer of a media company" who resides in New York City, according to Heritage Auctions which brokered the private sale.

== Smoke-free version ==
Twas the Night Before Christmas: Edited by Santa Claus for the Benefit of Children of the 21st Century is a 2012 edited "smoke-free" version of "A Visit from St. Nicholas", published by Pamela McColl's Grafton and Scratch Publishing. The reference to St. Nicholas's pipe is removed. The book has been translated and published in four different languages.

== In popular culture ==
The poem is read or recited in numerous Christmas films, including Prancer (1989), National Lampoon's Christmas Vacation (1989), The Santa Clause (1994), Reindeer Games (2000), and Falling for Christmas (2016). It also inspired two television specials called 'Twas the Night Before Christmas, made in 1974 and 1977.

'Twas the Night Before Christmas (2022) is a Hallmark Channel film about a town's annual Christmas Eve courtroom production debating the true authorship of the poem.

== See also ==
- Santa Claus's reindeer
- "Old Santeclaus with Much Delight"
- List of Christmas-themed literature
