= Rudolph the Red-Nosed Reindeer (disambiguation) =

Rudolph the Red-Nosed Reindeer is a legendary Christmas character, originally from a booklet by Robert Lewis May.

Rudolph the Red-Nosed Reindeer may also refer to:

- Rudolph the Red-Nosed Reindeer (1948 film), an animated short by Max Fleischer
- "Rudolph the Red-Nosed Reindeer" (song), written by Johnny Marks, sung most famously by Gene Autry in 1949, However was popularized by Burl Ives in 1964
- Rudolph the Red-Nosed Reindeer (TV special), 1964
  - Rudolph the Red-Nosed Reindeer (soundtrack), from the special
  - Rudolph the Red-Nosed Reindeer (video game), based on the special
- Rudolph the Red-Nosed Reindeer: The Movie, 1998

== See also ==
- Rudolph (disambiguation)
- Red nose (disambiguation)
- Reindeer (disambiguation)
