= Rudolph the Red-Nosed Reindeer and the Island of Misfit Toys =

2001 animated film

- DVD cover
- Directed by: Bill Kowalchuk
- Screenplay by: Michael Aschner
- Story by: Kevin Hopps
- Based on: Rudolph the Red-Nosed Reindeer by Johnny Marks (song) and Robert L. May (story)
- Produced by: Bill Kowalchuk
- Starring: Jamie Lee Curtis; Rick Moranis; Kathleen Barr; Scott McNeil; Garry Chalk
- Narrated by: Richard Dreyfuss
- Edited by: Lennie Nelson
- Music by: Bruce Roberts; Diana B
- Production companies: Golden Books Family Entertainment; Tundra Productions
- Distributed by: GoodTimes Entertainment (United States); BKN International (Internationally)
- Release date: October 30, 2001
- Running time: 76 minutes
- Countries: United States; Canada
- Language: English

Rudolph the Red-Nosed Reindeer and the Island of Misfit Toys is a 2001 direct-to-video animated Christmas adventure musical film directed by Bill Kowalchuk for GoodTimes Entertainment. It was released on VHS and DVD on October 30, 2001. The film takes place after the events of the original special, and revisits characters such as Yukon Cornelius, Hermey the elf (now a dentist), Abominable Snow Monster (Bumble) and Rudolph the Red-Nosed Reindeer, who is now famous in the North Pole.

GoodTimes Entertainment, three years prior, had released Rudolph the Red-Nosed Reindeer: The Movie, which also featured Kathleen Barr as the voice of the titular character, but was set in a separate continuity with different supporting characters. Golden Books Family Entertainment was retained as the production company. The voice cast includes Rick Moranis, Jamie Lee Curtis and Richard Dreyfuss, among others. Unlike the 1964 special, CGI animation was used instead of stop motion puppetry.

A cover of the eponymous song is performed by Tony Bennett and plays during the film's opening and closing credits.

== Plot ==
In the time since saving the day after the foggy Christmas Eve, Rudolph has soon become the most famous reindeer of them all. Although generally happy to no longer be bullied and enjoying his budding romance with Clarice, he finds himself overwhelmed by the fame and believes it to be a shallow appreciation of the benefits of his nose rather than for actually him, and begins to long for a regular nose so he can live a normal life. Meanwhile, a shadow looms over the impending Christmas due to the actions of the Toy Taker, a thief that steals Christmas toys from people's homes.

After King Moonracer requires a root canal dental treatment, Hermey – now a full-fledged dentist – is asked to come to the Island of Misfit Toys to do the treatment, with Rudolph deciding to come along as an assistant to get some time away from the North Pole. While they are gone, the Toy Taker completely robs Santa's warehouse. On the return trip the next day, a storm shipwrecks Rudolph and Hermey on Castaway Cove, an ice habitat run by a hippopotamus fairy named Queen Camilla, who fixes toys and keeps them safe. As thanks for helping them, Rudolph and Hermey agree to have Santa form a similar partnership with her as he has with King Moonracer. In return, Camilla agrees to give Rudolph a normal nose at a later date.

Rudolph and Hermey return home three days ahead of Christmas, where the former and Clarice finally confess their feelings, causing Clarice to be able to fly. After they begin a relationship, however, they discover the Toy Taker's crime. Investigating with Santa and the other elves, they find stuffing and odd footprints. Rudolph deduces the Toy Taker will strike either Castaway Cove or the Island of Misfit Toys next, so he, Clarice, Hermey, Yukon and the Bumble devise a plan to disguise themselves as toys and hijack the blimp that the Toy Taker uses. Meanwhile, the Toy Taker keeps the toys in a frozen volcano, where he claims he is saving them from the truth that children outgrow their toys and throw them away.

Unable to arrive in time to save Castaway Cove's toys, Rudolph's group sets their trap on the Island of Misfit Toys. They manage to sneak aboard the blimp with the Misfit Toys except for Bumble, who is too large to fit into the blimp, so he follows on an ice flow. Eventually, the Toy Taker realizes that they are intruders, and dumps them out of the blimp. They fly back and Yukon pursues the Toy Taker around the blimp, but his shoes puncture holes, and he falls off the blimp after losing balance, but he is caught by Bumble. Hermey pilots the blimp back to Christmastown, and he is saved by Bumble before crashing.

The Toy Taker attempts to escape by heading into Yukon's Peppermint Mine, with Rudolph and Clarice following him. A mine cart chase ensues, ending with Rudolph saving the Toy Taker from falling to his death. As the rest of the group and Christmastown residents arrive, the Toy Taker tries fleeing through a cave, but is caught by Yukon and Rudolph using Hermey's dental floss. After removing the Toy Taker's coat and hat, the figure is revealed to be a ripped teddy bear on stilts named Mr. Cuddles, who explains that he used to belong to a boy named Steven who outgrew him and he was eventually thrown away. Afterward, he became the Toy Taker in an effort to save other toys from meeting the same fate. Santa explains that although it is true that some children outgrow their toys, he knew that Steven was looking for him.

Rudolph and his friends agree to bring Mr. Cuddles to Queen Camilla to repair him and cheer him up. Rudolph also decides to keep his nose, realizing how useful it is. Mr. Cuddles returns all the toys ahead of Christmas Eve, and later he accompanies Santa and Rudolph on their annual voyage. Along the way, Santa tells him that Steven intended to save him as a family gift, and explains that he is all grown up now with a child of his own. Santa places Mr. Cuddles in the bed of Steven's young daughter, who awakens and embraces him. Steven walks into the room to check on his daughter and smiles as Santa, Rudolph, and the other reindeer fly away into the night.

== Cast ==
- Kathleen Barr as:
  - Rudolph
  - Mrs. Claus
  - Dolly for Sue
  - Peggy the Piggy Bank
  - Tooth Fairy
  - The Rocking Horse
- Scott McNeil as:
  - Hermey the Elf
  - Yukon Cornelius
  - The Boomerang Who Won't Come Back
  - Coach Comet
  - The Duck
- Garry Chalk as:
  - Santa Claus
  - Bumble the Abominable Snow Monster of the North
- Richard Dreyfuss as Scoop T. Snowman (Sam the Snowman’s Replacement)
  - Bruce Roberts as Scoop T. Snowman (singing voice)
- Rick Moranis (Note: Rick Moranis was billed as "Rick Moranis" in opening credits, and as "Richard Moranis" in the closing credits.) as The Toy Taker/Mr. Cuddles
  - Don Brown as The Toy Taker's Vocal Sound Effects
  - Bruce Roberts as The Toy Taker/Mr. Cuddles (singing voice)
- Jamie Lee Curtis as Queen Camilla
  - Shawn Southwick as Queen Camilla (singing voice)
- Elizabeth Carol Savenkoff as Clarice
  - Shawn Southwick as Clarice (singing voice)
- Alec Willows as:
  - The yellow Kite Who's Scared of Heights
  - Additional Voices
  - Bruce Roberts as The Kite Who's Scared of Heights (singing voice)
- Colin Murdock as:
  - King Moonracer
  - Reindeer #1
- Peter Kelamis as The Foreman Elf
- Brent Miller as Hank
- Lee Tockar as:
  - Charlie in the Box
  - The Meowing Wind-Up Mouse
  - The Gingerbread Guard
- Terry Klassen as:
  - The Telephone
  - Dizzy the Top

== Soundtrack ==
Rudolph the Red-Nosed Reindeer and the Island of Misfit Toys

Studio album
- Released: 2001
- Genre: Children
- Length: 30:00
- Labels: Chalkboard Music, Inc.
- Producer: Bruce Roberts

The same year the movie was released, a soundtrack was released by Bruce Roberts with his company, Chalkboard Music, Inc.

== Track listing ==
1. "Rudolph the Red-Nosed Reindeer" (Johnny Marks) – Tony Bennett (1:43)
2. "Keep Your Chin Up" (Bruce Roberts and Diana B) – Shawn Southwick and Paul Engemann (2:56)
3. "Beyond the Stars" (Bruce Roberts and Diana B) – Clark Anderson (3:14)
4. "The Island of Misfit Toys" (Bruce Roberts and Diana B) – Bruce Roberts, Shawn Southwick and Paul Engemann (3:14)
5. "The Toy Taker" (Bruce Roberts and Diana B) – Bruce Roberts (3:16)
6. "Beautiful Like Me" (Bruce Roberts and Diana B) – Shawn Southwick and Bruce Roberts (3:07)
7. "Mr. Cuddles" (Bruce Roberts and Diana B) – Bruce Roberts (2:23)
8. "The Best Christmas Ever" (Bruce Roberts and Diana B) – Shawn Southwick, Paul Engemann, Bruce Roberts, Nick Di Fruscia, David Tobocman and Diana B (2:56)
9. "Rudolph's Winterama / The Toy Taker's Quest" (Bruce Roberts and Diana B) – Instrumental (2:26)
10. "Rudolph's Big Chase" (Bruce Roberts and Diana B) – Instrumental (5:06)

== Reception ==
The film received mixed-to-negative reviews, with critics citing the poor CGI animation and weak story. However, the film's voice acting was praised, particularly for Curtis and Moranis.

== See also ==
- Christmas film
- List of animated feature films
- List of children's films
- List of computer-animated films
- List of Rankin/Bass Productions films
