= St. Joseph Cemetery (River Grove, Illinois) =

Cemetery in Cook County, Illinois, US

- The front gates of St. Joseph Cemetery
- Interactive map of St. Joseph Cemetery

Details
- Established: 1904
- Location: River Grove, Illinois
- Country: United States
- Coordinates: 41°56′07″N 87°50′30″W
- Owned by: Archdiocese of Chicago
- No. of graves: >44,000
- Website: Official website
- Find a Grave: St. Joseph Cemetery

St. Joseph Catholic Cemetery & Mausoleums is located at Belmont and Cumberland Avenues, in River Grove, Illinois, United States.

The cemetery was consecrated in 1904.

== Notable burials ==
- Emil Kush (1916–1969), MLB pitcher and manager
- "Long Tom" Hughes (1878–1956), MLB pitcher
- Robert L. May (1905–1976), creator of Rudolph the Red-Nosed Reindeer
- Baby Face Nelson (1908–1934), gangster, buried with his wife Helen Gillis (1911–1987)
- Roman Pucinski (1919–2002), United States Representative, informal leader of Polish-American community in Chicago
- Robert L. Stevenson (1890–1952), first coach of the DePaul University men's basketball program from 1923 to 1924.
- Frank M. Taylor (1869–1941), thoroughbred racehorse trainer
- Victims of the Eastland Disaster (1915)
