= Have a Holly Jolly Christmas =

Studio album by Burl Ives
- Released: October 1965
- Recorded: 1964
- Studio: Brooklyn Studios
- Genre: Christmas, folk, pop
- Length: 29:28
- Label: Decca
- Producer: Milt Gabler

Burl Ives chronology
On the Beach at Waikiki (1965)	Have a Holly Jolly Christmas (1965)	Shall We Gather at the River? (1965)

Professional ratings
Review scores
Source	Rating
Allmusic	4.5/5 stars

Have a Holly Jolly Christmas is a Christmas album by American folk singer Burl Ives, first released by Decca Records in October 1965 (recorded in 1964). It peaked at #32 on Billboard's Best Bets For Christmas album chart on December 2, 1967.

Ives had recorded two of the songs on the album ("A Holly Jolly Christmas" and "Rudolph the Red-Nosed Reindeer") previously for the Rudolph the Red-Nosed Reindeer soundtrack, but he recorded new versions for Have a Holly Jolly Christmas. "A Holly Jolly Christmas" in particular had a significantly different and slower arrangement, which is more commonly heard today. This version had already been released as a single the previous year, with a B-side of "Snow for Johnny", which he also featured on the album.

== Track listing ==
LP side 1
No.	Title	Writer(s)	Length
1.	"A Holly Jolly Christmas"	Johnny Marks	2:15
2.	"Christmas is a Birthday"	Gregory Paul Deutsch; Dick Manning	2:42
3.	"Santa Claus is Coming to Town"	J. Fred Coots; Haven Gillespie	2:09
4.	"Christmas Child"	Sid Tepper; Roy C. Bennett	2:50
5.	"White Christmas"	Irving Berlin	2:10
6.	"Christmas Can't Be Far Away"	Boudleaux Bryant	2:34

LP side 2
No.	Title	Writer(s)	Length
1.	"The Little Drummer Boy"	Katherine K. Davis; Henry V. Onorati; Harry Simeone	3:17
2.	"Snow for Johnny"	Gregory Paul Deutsch; Dick Manning	2:42
3.	"Rudolph the Red-Nosed Reindeer"	Johnny Marks	2:10
4.	"Winter Wonderland"	Felix Bernard; Dick Smith	2:17
5.	"Silver Bells"	Jay Livingston; Ray Evans	2:13
6.	"I Heard the Bells on Christmas Day"	Johnny Marks	2:13

== Personnel ==
- Burl Ives – lead vocals
- Owen Bradley – director of chorus and orchestra

== Charts ==
Chart performance for Have a Holly Jolly Christmas
Chart (2019–2023)	Peak position
Canadian Albums (Billboard)	71
Dutch Albums (Album Top 100)	48
Lithuanian Albums (AGATA)	27
Swedish Albums (Sverigetopplistan)	47
