= Rudolph the Red-Nosed Reindeer (1948 film) =

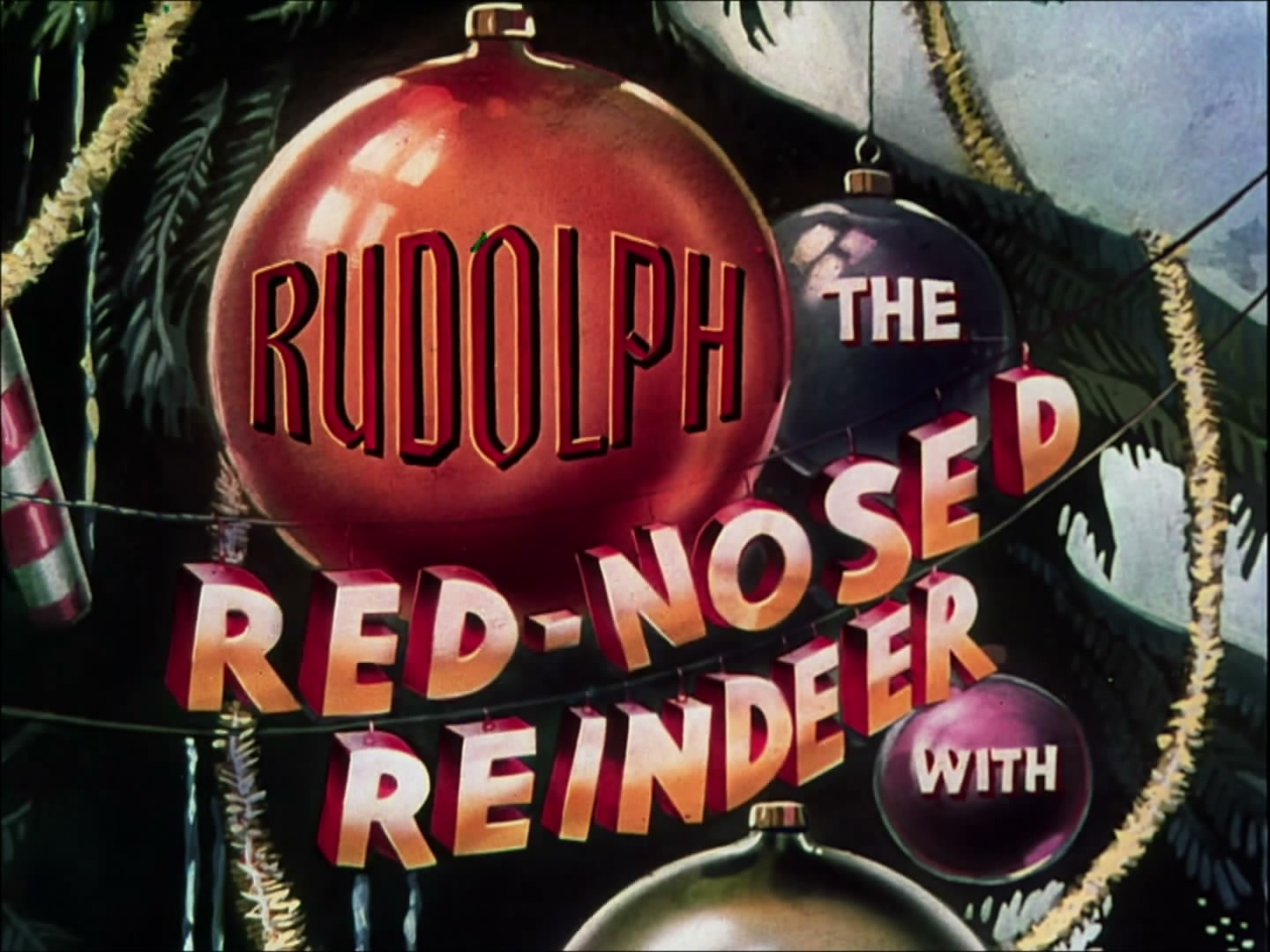
- Directed by: Max Fleischer
- Written by: Robert L. May; Screen Adaptation: Joseph Stultz
- Based on: Rudolph the Red-Nosed Reindeer by Robert L. May
- Produced by: Max Fleischer
- Starring: Paul Wing
- Narrated by: Paul Wing
- Cinematography: Charles Schettler
- Music by: Samuel Benavie; James Higgins; George Kleinsinger; Harry R. Wilson
- Animation by: Howard Kakudo; Robinson McKee; Fletcher Smith; William Sturm
- Backgrounds by: Scenic Artist: Shane Miller
- Color process: Technicolor
- Production company: Jam Handy Organization
- Distributed by: Jam Handy Organization
- Release date: November 11, 1948
- Running time: 8:11
- Country: United States
- Language: English

Rudolph the Red-Nosed Reindeer is a 1948 American animated short film produced and directed by Max Fleischer for Jam Handy based on the 1939 Robert L. May poem of the same name, about a flying reindeer who helps Santa Claus.

== Plot ==
In the "hills", several reindeer children are busy having a fun time: ice skating, tree climbing, leap-frogging, even decorating a Christmas tree. One young reindeer decorating a tree spots a red object and, curious, tickles it with a leaf. It turns out to be Rudolph, who flops out of the tree with a sneeze. The reindeer who revealed him teases him over his shiny red nose, which hurts his feelings. When he tries to wrap the nose to hide it and join the others on the ice, another snatches the cover away. Rejected and saddened after being teased and made fun of by the other reindeer children, Rudolph returns home where his mother greets him and tries to cheer him up by reminding him to hang his stocking for Santa. He quickly does so, imagining Santa giving him a lot of toys, and quickly goes to bed, though his sleep is incredibly fitful, saddened by the other reindeer's teasing and taunting.

Meanwhile in the North Pole, Santa Claus peeks out of his workshop and takes notice of the heavy fog, noting that it would be tough to get through on his own. When the grandfather clock strikes midnight, Santa quickly rushes in to get his reindeer and get ready for the travel ahead. As they travel, Santa warns that they'd have to fly low to get through the fog, only to crash into some trees. The Reindeer get loose and they try again. Over a town, Santa and the reindeer nearly crash into an airplane and, a little later, crash onto a rooftop. The reindeer and sleigh are stuck on the roof, but they're able to break free.

Reaching Rudolph's house, Santa gives presents to a set of reindeer children, but is caught off-guard by the light in Rudolph's room, only to learn that it's Rudolph's shiny red nose. Surprised by this, he gets an idea and wakes Rudolph. Rudolph attempts to hide his nose, but Santa stops him and tells him of his perils. Agreeing to help him, Rudolph leaves a note for his parents before joining Santa on his journey, leading the other reindeer throughout the rest of the night.

The next morning, news of Rudolph's journey reaches his hometown and all the other reindeer race to a stadium where Santa appoints Rudolph as the commander-in-chief. Blushing from head to toe, Rudolph bashfully tells everyone "Merry Christmas to all and to all a good night".

== Voices ==
- Paul Wing

== Production ==
This 8-minute animated interpretation of the Christmas poem preceded Gene Autry's 1949 song "Rudolph, the Red-Nosed Reindeer" and the later more famous animated 1964 version by Rankin/Bass. It was based on Robert L. May's 1939 story, rather than the song. The 1964 special more closely resembles the song rather than the original story.

The short was created to appease children waiting in line to see the store Santa Claus. It was also run in theaters to advertise Montgomery Ward department stores, publisher of the original story. The original release included a credit for the company, and lacked the famous song, with the opening credits instead playing over an instrumental version of "Silent Night, Holy Night". A 1951 re-release added a choral version of the song to the credits and removed the Montgomery Ward name.

== Distribution ==
The reissue is widely available on public domain videotapes and DVDs, as well as online. The original version is stored at the Library of Congress; there, it was posted online in 2014.

== In other media ==
The song and the scenes were added in Very Merry Christmas Songs, the Christmas video volume from Disney's Sing Along Songs. It was also featured on Rifftrax in 2009.

== See also ==
- Rudolph the Red-Nosed Reindeer, 1964 stop-motion animated television special
- Rudolph the Red-Nosed Reindeer: The Movie, 1998 animated feature
- List of Christmas films
