= Rudolph the Red-Nosed Reindeer (soundtrack) =

- Original LP cover art (1964 Decca)

Soundtrack album by cast
- Released: December 13, 1964 (LP); June 1, 1995 (CD)
- Recorded: 1964
- Genres: Soundtrack, Christmas music, Traditional pop
- Length: 35:22
- Labels: Decca Records (LP); MCA Records (CD)

Alternative cover
- CD re-issue cover art (1995 MCA)

Professional ratings
Review scores
Source	Rating
Allmusic	4/5 stars

Rudolph the Red-Nosed Reindeer is a soundtrack album to the 1964 Rankin/Bass television special of the same name. The original cast recordings from the TV special (side "A" of the original LP release) are supplemented with instrumental versions recorded by the Decca Concert Orchestra (on side "B") on the Compact Disc version. All songs used in the television special were written by Johnny Marks.

The original LP album was first released in 1964. It was reissued as a CD in 1995. The CD was certified Gold by the RIAA on November 30, 2004. The album has sold 1,411,200 copies in the United States since 1991 when SoundScan began tracking sales.

== Track listing ==
All tracks are written by Johnny Marks, except where noted.

Side One
No.	Title	Lead vocal	Length
1.	"Overture and A Holly Jolly Christmas" (^{[a]})	Burl Ives	2:23
2.	"Jingle Jingle Jingle"	Stan Francis	1:13
3.	"We Are Santa's Elves"		1:31
4.	"There's Always Tomorrow"	Janis Orenstein	1:42
5.	"We're a Couple of Misfits" (^{[b]})	Billie Mae Richards; Paul Soles	1:18
6.	"Silver and Gold"	Burl Ives	1:42
7.	"The Most Wonderful Day of the Year"		2:18
8.	"A Holly Jolly Christmas" (^{[a]})	Burl Ives	1:18
9.	"Rudolph the Red-Nosed Reindeer Finale" (^{[c]})	Burl Ives	1:19
Total length:			14:44

Side Two
No.	Title	Writer(s)	Length
10.	"Rudolph the Red-Nosed Reindeer" (instrumental)		1:50
11.	"There's Always Tomorrow" (instrumental)		2:22
12.	"Jingle Jingle Jingle" (instrumental)		2:14
13.	"We're a Couple of Misfits" (instrumental)		1:50
14.	"Silver and Gold" (instrumental)		2:21
15.	"We Are Santa's Elves" (instrumental)		1:09
16.	"The Most Wonderful Day of the Year" (instrumental)		2:22
17.	"A Holly Jolly Christmas" (instrumental)		1:32
18.	"Christmas Medley: a. "The Night Before Christmas Song"; b. "A Merry Merry Christmas"; c. "When Santa Claus Gets Your Letter"; d. "Rockin' Around the Christmas Tree"" (instrumental^{[d]})		3:17
19.	"I Heard the Bells on Christmas Day" (instrumental)	Henry Wadsworth Longfellow	1:41
Total length:			20:38

Notes

- ^{^[a]} The recordings of "A Holly Jolly Christmas" featured on this album and heard in the TV special, were never released as singles, and none of them became the one commonly heard during the holiday season. That version—featuring Burl Ives with an acoustic guitar intro and a slower tempo—was a different recording; first released as a single in November of 1964 (B-side track, "Snow for Johnny"), and then featured the following year on Ives' 1965 Christmas album Have a Holly Jolly Christmas.
- ^{^[b]}The brand-new song "Fame and Fortune", which replaced "We're a Couple of Misfits" in airings of the television special from 1965 through until the special was restored in 1998, does not appear on the soundtrack album.
- ^{^[c]} The recordings of " "Rudolph the Red-Nosed Reindeer" featured on this album and heard in the TV special, are two different recordings, the television version of which is more commonly heard during the holiday season. An alternate version—featuring Burl Ives with an acoustic guitar and a slower tempo—was a different recording featured the following year on Ives' 1965 Christmas album Have a Holly Jolly Christmas.
- ^{^[d]} On the CD re-issue, contents / track order are the same except the "Christmas Medley" is placed in the middle, at track 10 (between A9 and B1 - the Burl Ives' sung and instrumental versions of "Rudolph the Red-Nosed Reindeer").

== Voices and personnel ==
- Burl Ives – voice of Sam the Snowman ("A Holly Jolly Christmas," "Silver and Gold," "Rudolph the Red-Nosed Reindeer")
- Stan Francis – voice of Santa Claus ("Jingle, Jingle, Jingle")
- Janis Orenstein – voice of Clarice ("There's Always Tomorrow")
- Billie Mae Richards – voice of Rudolph ("We're A Couple Of Misfits")
- Paul Soles – voice of Hermey ("We're A Couple Of Misfits")
- Maury Laws – musical director of the Videocraft TV Musical
- Decca Concert Orchestra (side B instrumentals)
- Herbert Rehbein – conductor, Decca Concert Orchestra

== Charts ==
=== Weekly charts ===
Chart (2004)	Peak position
US Top Catalog Albums (Billboard)	4
US Top Holiday Albums (Billboard)	5

Chart (2020)	Peak position
US Billboard 200	16
US Top Country Albums (Billboard)	1

Chart (2022–2026)	Peak position
Canadian Albums (Billboard)	20
US Kid Albums (Billboard)	6
US Soundtrack Albums (Billboard)	9

=== Year-end charts ===
Chart (2018)	Position
US Top Country Albums (Billboard)	76
Chart (2019)	Position
US Top Country Albums (Billboard)	50
Chart (2020)	Position
US Top Country Albums (Billboard)	51
Chart (2022)	Position
US Top Country Albums (Billboard)	45
Chart (2023)	Position
US Top Country Albums (Billboard)	46
Chart (2024)	Position
US Top Country Albums (Billboard)	50
Chart (2025)	Position
US Top Country Albums (Billboard)	56
