= Robbie the Reindeer =

- Genre: Christmas-themed animated comedy
- Created by: Richard Curtis
- Based on: Rudolph the Red-Nosed Reindeer by Robert L. May (unofficially)
- Voices of: Ardal O'Hanlon; Jane Horrocks; Steve Coogan; Caroline Quentin; Paul Whitehouse; Ricky Tomlinson; Jean Alexander; Harry Enfield; Robbie Williams; Rhys Ifans; Alistair McGowan
- Country of origin: United Kingdom
- Original language: English

Production
- Running time: 30 minutes
- Production companies: BBC Bristol; Comic Relief; Absolute Digital Pictures

Original release
- Network: BBC One
- Release: 25 December 1999 – 25 December 2007

Robbie the Reindeer is a trilogy of three animated comedy television specials created by Richard Curtis. The first special is Christmas-themed and the two subsequent specials are not. They follow the title reindeer character who travels to the North Pole to follow in his father's footsteps and join Santa Claus's reindeer sleigh team. The characters are loosely (and unofficially) based on Rudolph the Red-Nosed Reindeer by Robert L. May.

The first two specials, "Hooves of Fire" and "Legend of the Lost Tribe", were animated in stop-motion by the BBC Bristol animation unit and Aardman Animations. The third special, "Close Encounters of the Herd Kind", was animated in computer animation by Absolute Digital Pictures. The specials were produced by BBC Bristol, Absolute Digital Pictures and Comic Relief. They premiered on BBC One between 1999 and 2007 and were distributed by BBC Studios.

== Characters ==
- Robbie: The easy-going and childlike son of Rudolph whose nose acts as a tracking device. He becomes captain of the sleigh team at the end of "Hooves of Fire."
- Prancer: An upbeat and slow-witted reindeer and a member of the sleigh team that befriends Robbie.
- Donner: A support member of the sleigh team who is Robbie's best female friend, love interest and eventual wife. The name is a play on the British pronunciation of the feminine name 'Donna'. Reindeer, unlike other members of the deer family, have antlers in both sexes, so that both Donner and Vixen can be accurately portrayed as female; in the special, female reindeer have antlers but are depicted with lighter-colored fur. This Donner is not the same Donner from A Visit from St. Nicholas, as she did not actually power Santa's sleigh on Christmas Eve; a previous TV special established that Donner as a buck and, implicitly, Robbie's grandfather, implying that, at least among North Pole reindeer, that the given name Donner is gender-neutral.
- Blitzen: The former captain of the sleigh team who bitter at having been upstaged and replaced by Robbie's famous father and seeks to prevent Robbie from repeating that feat.
- Old Jingle: The reindeer that trained Rudolph and prepares Robbie for The Reindeer Games.
- Tapir: A reindeer who is a good friend of Robbie and a member of the sleigh team.
- Des Yeti and Alan Snowman: Commentators for The Reindeer Games. The characters are parodies of presenter Des Lynam and football commentator Alan Hansen (who both starred on BBC One's Match of the Day in the 1990s) in the English dub, and Dick Enberg and Dan Dierdorf (who were the second broadcast team on the NFL on CBS at the time and both provided their own voices) in the American dub.
- Vixen: An attractive, but vain female reindeer and a member of the sleigh team. She was Blitzen's girlfriend until she ended their relationship at the end of "Hooves of Fire" and the original object of Robbie's unrequited affections before he fell in love with Donner.
- "Ru:" Robbie's father, a legendary red-nosed former sleigh team member (seen only in a painting) who once "saved the day" for Santa and as a result is popular enough to have merchandise and a song named after him. He has since moved south and sent his son Robbie to the North Pole for "character building." Blitzen has long been jealous of "Ru" for being more famous and, in a running gag, interrupts any character who attempts to say his full name (presumably Rudolph the Red-Nosed Reindeer, censored for trademark avoidance) as he forbids them to said it in his presence.

== List of specials ==
No.	Title	Directed by	Written by	Music by	Produced by	Original release date
1	"Hooves of Fire"	Richard "Golly" Goleszowski	Kevin Cecil, Andy Riley and Richard Curtis	Mark Knopfler and Guy Fletcher	Jacqueline White	25 December 1999
Wanting to work as Santa's navigator, Robbie arrives at the North Pole and becomes acquainted with the sleigh team, which includes Prancer, Donner, Blitzen and Vixen. Although Vixen is in a relationship with Blitzen, Robbie is soon besotted by her. Blitzen, who envies Robbie's father Rudolph, plots to have Robbie kicked off the team by discouraging him from taking his fitness training seriously, conceiving a new sleigh with inbuilt GPS navigation and proposing that the least fit reindeer is made redundant. Faking sincerity, Blitzen convinces a worried Robbie that Santa will give him preferential treatment and delay the sleigh, prompting Robbie to leave for home. Finding the journey too difficult, he is found by Santa's elves and stays with them to work menial jobs. Donner finds Robbie, informs him of Blitzen's vengeful attitude and convinces him to get back on the Sleigh Team by competing in The Reindeer Games. The two find Old Jingle, who trains Robbie with Donner and the elves' help. On the day of the games, Old Jingle becomes trapped under his house, Robbie rescues him but arrives late for the steeplechase as a result. Robbie is able to catch up with the others and ends up barely losing the race to Blitzen, who is soon disqualified and arrested when he is found to have used performance-enhancing substances. Vixen dumps Blitzen, finds that Robbie has now fallen for Donner and leaves the North Pole. Santa lets Robbie borrow the sleigh, which he uses to spend a romantic evening with Donner.
2	"Legend of the Lost Tribe"	Peter Peake	Kevin Cecil and Andy Riley	Joby Talbot	Jaqueline White	10 December 2002 (Canada); 13 December 2002 (US); 25 December 2002 (UK)
Robbie and the other reindeer now run a holiday resort. While rescuing a tourist, Robbie falls of a cliff and is rescued by a Viking, who then disappears. Later, Blitzen is released from prison early due to good behaviour, and along with his new rabbit business partner convinces the reindeer to rebuild their bankrupt resort, according to plans that turn out to be for a prison. Robbie's poor craftsmanship allows him to escape with Donner and Prancer; they seek the aid of the last remaining Viking tribe (whose diminutive members are all named "Magnus"). Robbie's methods of searching for the tribe strain his relationship with Donner, who dumps him in frustration shortly before the rabbit recaptures her and Prancer. Using special remote-controlled hats to turn them into living animatronics, Blitzen uses the former sleigh team as attractions in his amusement park Blitzen's Reindeer World. Robbie finds the tribe, who reveal that the other Vikings fought each other to death after running out of communities to pillage, yet they remain ashamed of their cowardice in avoiding that fate. Robbie brings them out of their shame, but is kidnapped mid-speech. The Vikings rescue Robbie and assist him in saving his friends. Blitzen engages in a hand-to-hand fight against Robbie which is interrupted by Donner talking to Robbie about their relationship. Blitzen convinces Robbie to propose to Donner and attempts to kill him before he can hear her answer. Donner accepts Robbie's proposal and finishes off Blitzen in a move that throws him directly back to jail. Meanwhile, Prancer overpowers the rabbit and discovers that he was the international criminal Carlos the Hamster in a mechanical disguise; Carlos is also jailed. To salvage their business, the reindeer partner with the Vikings to create a Reindeer and Viking themed disco.
3	"Close Encounters of the Herd Kind"	Donnie Anderson	Mark Huckerby and Nick Ostler	Rick Wentworth and Andrew McKenna	Donnie Anderson	25 December 2007
On the night before his wedding to Donner, Robbie picks up an alien crystal that falls from the sky. During the wedding, a voice telepathically warns him of the end of the world and he runs out mid-ceremony in panic. Robbie finds that the voice belongs to Gariiiiiii, an Earth Guardian, who warns him that an alien race named the Nargathrons plan on destroying earth and that Robbie's crystal powers their ultimate weapon. Moments before dying, Gariiiiiii tells Robbie to hide the Nargathron crystal and leaves his telepathy device. At the Sleigh Team's home, Nargathron queen Vorkana arrives and kidnaps Donner when she refuses to give Robbie's location. Prancer, Old Jingle and Tapir find Robbie, and the four of them discover Gariiiiiii's spaceship. Robbie flies to the Nargathron ship, where he is imprisoned with Donner. The others take the crystal back to their home, where Donner's sister Em reveals that she is a government agent who specialises in extraterrestrial life. She is able to contact the Earth Guardians using the crystal but is soon found by the Nargathrons. With the crystal, the Nargathrons count down to their destruction of Earth. Robbie uses the telepathy device to trick the guards into freeing Donner and himself, then uses the ship to teleport Donner back to earth. Robbie tricks Vorkana into standing on the ship's teleport pad and sends her to Em, who knocks her out. Robbie escapes the ship just moments before it is destroyed by the Earth Guardians, and uses the telepathy device to complete his wedding ceremony.

== Cast ==
Character	Specials			British version (original)	American version (dubbed)
	"Hooves of Fire"	"Legend of the Lost Tribe"	"Close Encounters of the Herd Kind"		
Narrator	check			Robbie Williams	James Woods
Robbie	check	check	check	Ardal O'Hanlon	Ben Stiller
Prancer	check	check	check	Paul Whitehouse	Brad Garrett
Blitzen	check	check		Steve Coogan	Hugh Grant
Donner	check	check	check	Jane Horrocks	Britney Spears
Vixen	check			Caroline Quentin	Leah Remini
Tapir	check	check	check	Sean Hughes	Jim Belushi
Old Jingle	check	check	check	Harry Enfield	Jerry Stiller
Head Elf	check			Rhys Ifans	Rob Paulsen
Santa Claus	check			Ricky Tomlinson	Jim Belushi
Mrs Santa	check			Jean Alexander	Grey DeLisle
Des Yeti	check	check		Alistair McGowan	Dick Enberg
Alan Snowman	check	check		Alistair McGowan	Dan Dierdorf
David Attenborough		check		Himself	Himself
White Rabbit		check		Jeff Goldblum	Jeff Goldblum
Penguin		check		Ricky Gervais	Ricky Gervais
Koala		check		Natalie Imbruglia	Leah Remini
Magnus		check		Reece Shearsmith; Steve Pemberton; Mark Gatiss; Jeremy Dyson	James Woods; Rob Paulsen; Grey DeLisle
Queen Vorkana			check	Gillian Anderson	
Em			check	Keira Knightley	
Vicar			check	Ozzy Osbourne	
Gariiiiiii			check	Michael Palin	
Computer			check	Graham Norton	
Earth Guardian			check	Russell Brand	

== Release ==
=== American dub ===
"Hooves of Fire" was first shown in the United States on Fox Family with the original British voices until 2001. In 2002, concurrently with the production of "Legend of the Lost Tribe," CBS acquired the rights to both specials and recorded new dialog with mostly American actors, including Ben Stiller, Britney Spears, and Hugh Grant. The American and British versions of "Legend of the Lost Tribe" featured Jeff Goldblum. Whereas the original British characters of Des Yeti and Alan Snowman originally parodied their counterparts on Match of the Day, the selection of Enberg and Dierdorf for the American dub parodied their work as a broadcast team for the NFL on CBS at the time. CBS stopped showing the program after the 2005 Christmas season, after which Nicktoons Network showed the original British version for two years. In 2016, CBS began broadcasting the first two specials again using the American dub. "Close Encounters of the Herd Kind" has not been dubbed nor made available in the United States.

In addition to the dub, the first two films have been shown as a single-hour long (45 minutes and advertisements) special on CBS since 2002, cutting around fifteen minutes of material from the original versions. One of the most obvious edits is the removal of the scene where Robbie actually discovers the Vikings in the first place. The edited and redubbed versions of "Hooves of Fire" and "Legend of the Lost Tribe" premiered on CBS on 13 December 2002. The films were also cropped to 4:3 from their original 16:9 aspect ratio.

The uncut version of the dub is featured on the 2003 American DVD, with the original British version as an alternate audio track. The DVD also presents the films in their original aspect ratio of 16:9.

Before the CBS airing of "Legend of the Lost Tribe", the original British version of the film also premiered in Canada on CBC on 10 December 2002.

CBS stopped carrying the two specials in 2024 as its pending subsumption into Paramount Skydance was completed and the network permanently cut almost all of its recurring holiday offerings.

=== Home video ===
In the United Kingdom, Hooves of Fire was released on DVD on 27 November 2000. A "Collector's Edition" release adding Legend of the Lost Tribe followed on 24 November 2003 and a collection of all three specials, subtitled The Whole Herd, was released on 2 November 2009. The 2009 release contained the special features from previous releases, including a 5.1 sound mix on Hooves of Fire, directors' commentary on the first two specials, the complete Hooves storyboard, behind-the-scenes footage and an interview with Peter Peake. In the United States, Hooves of Fire was released on DVD on 4 September 2001, containing the British voice cast and the same extras as the UK release. A DVD adding Legend of the Lost Tribe was released on 7 October 2003, containing both the British and American dialogue tracks. This release also contained the extras from the UK edition, with the exception of the 5.1 mix and storyboards for Hooves of Fire.
