= Hooves of Fire =

- Robbie the Reindeer episode
- Episode no.: Season 1 Episode 1
- Directed by: Richard Starzak
- Written by: Andy Riley; Kevin Cecil; Richard Curtis
- Production code: BBC
- Original air date: 25 December 1999

"Hooves of Fire" is one of three animated BBC Christmas comedy television specials, filmed using stop motion techniques, and presented in 1999 in aid of Comic Relief.

== Story ==
A reindeer fawn named Robbie arrives at Coldchester, town of the North Pole to follow in his father's hoofprints of being a navigator for Santa Claus's sleigh team. Robbie's nose possesses a GPS that can find anything, but he also suffers from an attention deficit disorder, which prompted his being sent to Coldchester for "character building." Upon arriving at the Reindeer Lodge, he meets the sleigh team: Donner, a support doe who holds an unrequited crush on Robbie, who sees her as just a friend; Prancer, a hip, friendly and overweight buck; Vixen, an attractive but apathetic doe whom Robbie falls for; and Blitzen, the senior member of the sleigh team and Vixen's stag. Blitzen, embittered from Robbie's father's sudden popularity after saving Christmas, plans to prevent Robbie from being part of the sleigh team out of vengeance. Robbie dislikes the sleigh team's intense year-round workout regimen, and Blitzen decides to enable Robbie's bad habits to ensure he fails.

During a Christmas party at Santa's house, Santa Claus shows off an upgraded sleigh, which includes built-in navigation. Fearing his place on the team gone, Robbie is assured by Santa that only the least fit reindeer will be fired. Back at the lodge, Blitzen tells Robbie that his lackadaisical ways will cause a late Christmas and that Robbie's father will be blamed; Robbie leaves in shame but freezes solid on the way home.

Three elves find Robbie and defrost him with intent of eating him. Robbie pleads to work with them at their toy factory. A promising start on the production line goes awry, and Robbie is demoted to sweeper; he loses interest in the job in favor of playing with chimera toys like "Sebastian Musclewhale" and "Octomonkey," so the elves as a last resort attach him to the forklift. Donner pulls a despondent Robbie from the factory, shows him how Blitzen truly feels, and devises a plan to get Robbie back into shape: since the other reindeer are his competition and seek to undermine him, Robbie will train alone with his father's old trainer, the senile Old Jingle. Over the next several months, Robbie is whipped into shape for the Reindeer Games, where the winner of the steeplechase will earn the right to lead Santa's sleigh.

On the day of the Reindeer Games, Blitzen gets off to an early lead as Robbie arrives late. Vixen attempts to convince Robbie not to race for her sake, but Robbie has fallen out of love with her and into love with Donner. As the steeplechase starts, he is again distracted, first by saving Mrs. Claus's baby from a falling walrus, and then by prying Old Jingle out from underneath his house using Sebastian and Octomonkey. He rejoins the race and catches up to Blitzen quickly, but Blitzen cheats by lifting the hurdle to knock Robbie out. He recovers by utilizing his magic nose, which propels him to a photo finish—Blitzen is initially declared winner but is disqualified for doping, after which Vixen dumps him. Robbie then demonstrates his superiority at all of the other events, and Santa Claus offers Robbie the lead of the sleigh team and a test drive in the new sleigh, which Robbie uses to take Donner on a date to the moon. Meanwhile, Old Jingle marries one of the elves.

In scenes during the credits, Prancer plays air guitar with a tennis racket, Vixen attempts to hitchhike out of the North Pole, Blitzen is seen in Robbie's old job bitterly painting dolls of Robbie, and Santa puts his underwear on a washing line.

== Voices ==
This UK animation has been aired in both America and Britain. Each had its own dubbing.

=== British ===
In the original British production, Robbie was voiced by Ardal O'Hanlon. Other voices were provided by Jane Horrocks (Donner), Steve Coogan (Blitzen), Caroline Quentin (Vixen), Ricky Tomlinson (Santa), Jean Alexander (Mrs. Santa), Paul Whitehouse (Prancer), Harry Enfield (Old Jingle), Sean Hughes (Tapir), Seal as a singing seal performing "Crazy", impressionist Alistair McGowan taking off Alan Hansen (portrayed as a snowman) and Des Lynam (as a yeti).

=== American ===
The program was first shown in the United States on Fox Family with the original British voices until 2001. CBS then acquired the rights and began airing the special in 2002, but the program was redubbed with American accents. Ben Stiller voiced Robbie, while other voices included Britney Spears (Donner), Leah Remini (Vixen), Jim Belushi (Santa Claus), Dick Enberg and Dan Dierdorf (Allen Snowman and Des Yeti, parodying Enberg and Dierdorf's NFL on CBS roles), Brad Garrett (Prancer), and Stiller's father Jerry (Jingle and a talking garbage bag). Hugh Grant provided Blitzen's dialogue mainly maintaining Coogan's style.

The U.S. dub and edit also makes further edits to remove any references to red noses (which carry a double meaning as a symbol of the Comic Relief organisation); Rudolph's name had already been censored in the original to avoid trademark concerns, but the American edit further distances itself by painting Robbie's nose brown and Rudolph's nose (as depicted on a blimp) yellow.

== Awards ==
Hooves of Fire won the 2000 BAFTA for Best Entertainment (Programme or Series). It was also honored at the 3rd International Festival of Animated Feature Films and TV Specials where it won the prize for Best TV Special.
