= A Holly Jolly Christmas =

1964 Christmas song written by Johnny Marks

Single by Burl Ives

from the album Have a Holly Jolly Christmas (Note: The recording used in this single did not appear in the Rudolph the Red-Nosed Reindeer TV special, nor was it on the corresponding soundtrack. The version in this single was newly recorded with a much slower and different rendition, the one most commonly heard today. Both the "Holly Jolly Christmas" and its B-side, "Snow for Johnny" heard on this single, would later appear on Ives' 1965 Christmas album Have a Holly Jolly Christmas.)
- B-side: "Snow for Johnny"
- Released: November 1964
- Recorded: 1964
- Studio: Columbia (Nashville, Tennessee)
- Genre: Christmas, traditional pop
- Length: 2:15
- Label: Decca
- Songwriter: Johnny Marks
- Producer: Milt Gabler

Burl Ives singles chronology
"Pearly Shells (Popo O Ewa)" (1964)	"A Holly Jolly Christmas" (1964)	"Jealous" (1965)

"A Holly Jolly Christmas", also known as "Have a Holly Jolly Christmas", is a Christmas song written by Johnny Marks and most famously performed by Burl Ives. The song has since become one of the top 25 most-performed "holiday" songs written by ASCAP members, for the first five years of the 21st century.

== Background ==
"A Holly Jolly Christmas" was written by Johnny Marks in 1962. It was the title song of The Quinto Sisters' first album, Holly Jolly Christmas, recorded in June 1964 for Columbia Records, featuring guitarist Al Caiola with arrangements by Frank Hunter and Marty Manning.

The song was featured in the 1964 Rankin-Bass Christmas special, Rudolph the Red-Nosed Reindeer, in which Burl Ives voiced the narrator, Sam the Snowman. Originally to be sung by Larry D. Mann as Yukon Cornelius, the song, as well as "Silver and Gold", was given to Ives due to his singing fame. This version was also included on the soundtrack album.

The song was re-recorded by Ives and released in 1964 as a single and later featured the following year in his 1965 holiday album, Have a Holly Jolly Christmas. This version of "A Holly Jolly Christmas" has a somewhat slower arrangement than the Rudolph the Red-Nosed Reindeer version and features a twelve-string guitar solo introduction; it is this version that has since become the more commonly heard rendition on radio. This song mentions mistletoe in the bridge, where the singer asks the younger lover to "Kiss her once for me". "A Holly Jolly Christmas" features men and women singing the chorus, whose repeated "Ding-dong" imitation of Christmas bells are heard in the outro of the song, before it fades out.

The song's enduring popularity is evidenced by reaching its peak of No. 30 on the Billboard Adult Contemporary chart in 1998, as well as No. 21 on the U.S. Country Digital Songs chart and No. 5 on the Holiday 100 chart in 2011. It charted on the Billboard Hot 100 for the first time in 2017, after rules on chart eligibility for older songs had been relaxed several years before, and reached a peak of No. 38.

For the week ending December 8, 2018, the song re-entered the Hot 100 chart. It reached No. 10 for the week ending January 5, 2019. On the week ending January 4, 2020, "A Holly Jolly Christmas" reached a new peak of No. 4. With this feat, Ives now holds the record for the longest break between Hot 100 Top Ten as he returned to this minimum ranking after 56 years, seven months, and two weeks since his previous Top 10 hit and, at 109 years after birth, surpassing Louis Armstrong's "What a Wonderful World" (which reached the Top 40 when Armstrong would have been 86 years old) as the oldest artist, living or deceased, to have a Top 40 hit. As of December 2019, Ives's recording has sold 664,000 copies in the United States since becoming available for download in the digital era.

== Chart performance ==
=== Burl Ives version ===
==== Weekly charts ====
Weekly chart performance for "A Holly Jolly Christmas" by Burl Ives
Chart (1998–2024)	Peak position
Australia (ARIA)	11
Austria (Ö3 Austria Top 40)	53
Canada Hot 100 (Billboard)	6
Croatia International Airplay (Top lista)	13
Czech Republic Singles Digital (ČNS IFPI)	39
Estonia Airplay (TopHit)	98
Germany (GfK)	69
Global 200 (Billboard)	10
Greece International (IFPI)	50
Hungary (Single Top 40)	27
Hungary (Stream Top 40)	18
Ireland (IRMA)	29
Latvia Streaming (LaIPA)	16
Lithuania (AGATA)	17
Luxembourg (Billboard)	22
Netherlands (Single Top 100)	52
New Zealand (Recorded Music NZ)	15
Portugal (AFP)	39
Romania Airplay (TopHit)	51
Slovakia Singles Digital (ČNS IFPI)	28
Sweden (Sverigetopplistan)	43
Switzerland (Schweizer Hitparade)	23
UK Singles (Official Charts)	40
US Billboard Hot 100	4
US Adult Contemporary (Billboard)	30
U.S. Country Digital Songs (Billboard)	21
U.S. Country Streaming Songs (Billboard)	1
U.S. Holiday 100 (Billboard)	3
U.S. Rolling Stone Top 100	4

==== Monthly charts ====
Monthly chart performance for "A Holly Jolly Christmas"
Chart (2025)	Peak position
Estonia Airplay (TopHit)	77
Romania Airplay (TopHit)	59

==== Year-end charts ====
2022 year-end chart performance for "A Holly Jolly Christmas" by Burl Ives
Chart (2022)	Position
US Billboard Hot 100	89

2023 year-end chart performance for "A Holly Jolly Christmas" by Burl Ives
Chart (2023)	Position
US Billboard Hot 100	71

2024 year-end chart performance for "A Holly Jolly Christmas" by Burl Ives
Chart (2024)	Position
US Billboard Hot 100	94

=== Alan Jackson version ===
Chart performance for "A Holly Jolly Christmas" by Alan Jackson
Chart (1997–1998)	Peak position
US Hot Country Songs (Billboard)	51

=== Michael Bublé version ===
==== Weekly charts ====
Weekly chart performance for "Holly Jolly Christmas" by Michael Bublé
Chart (2011–2026)	Peak position
Australia (ARIA)	7
Austria (Ö3 Austria Top 40)	18
Belgium (Ultratop 50 Flanders)	22
Belgium (Ultratop 50 Wallonia)	22
Canada Hot 100 (Billboard)	12
Croatia (Billboard)	19
Croatia International Airplay (Top lista)	40
Czech Republic Singles Digital (ČNS IFPI)	21
Finland (Suomen virallinen lista)	17
France (SNEP)	35
Germany (GfK)	20
Global 200 (Billboard)	17
Greece International (IFPI)	74
Hungary (Single Top 40)	9
Hungary (Stream Top 40)	7
Iceland (Tónlistinn)	20
Ireland (IRMA)	21
Italy (FIMI)	20
Latvia Streaming (LaIPA)	8
Lithuania (AGATA)	10
Luxembourg (Billboard)	11
Netherlands (Single Top 100)	13
New Zealand (Recorded Music NZ)	10
Norway (VG-lista)	10
Philippines Hot 100 (Billboard Philippines)	97
Poland (Polish Airplay Top 100)	53
Poland (Polish Streaming Top 100)	17
Portugal (AFP)	11
Singapore (RIAS)	26
Slovakia Singles Digital (ČNS IFPI)	14
South Africa (RISA)	72
Spain (PROMUSICAE)	59
Sweden (Sverigetopplistan)	34
Switzerland (Schweizer Hitparade)	14
UK Singles (Official Charts)	21
US Billboard Hot 100	33
US Adult Contemporary (Billboard)	3
US Holiday 100 (Billboard)	22

==== Year-end charts ====
2023 year-end chart performance for "A Holly Jolly Christmas" by Michael Bublé
Chart (2023)	Position
Hungary (Single Top 40)	59

=== Lady Antebellum version ===
Chart performance for "A Holly Jolly Christmas" by Lady Antebellum
Chart (2012–2016)	Peak position
US Adult Contemporary (Billboard)	2
US Country Airplay (Billboard)	37
US Holiday 100 (Billboard)	80
US Hot Country Songs (Billboard)	35

== Certifications ==
=== Burl Ives version ===
Certifications for "Holly Jolly Christmas" by Burl Ives
Region	Certification	Certified units/sales
Australia (ARIA)	Platinum	70,000^{‡}
Denmark (IFPI Danmark)	Gold	45,000^{‡}
New Zealand (RMNZ)	Gold	15,000^{‡}
Portugal (AFP)	Gold	12,000^{‡}
United Kingdom (BPI)	Gold	400,000^{‡}
Streaming
Greece (IFPI Greece)	Gold	1,000,000^{†}
^{‡} Sales+streaming figures based on certification alone.^{†} Streaming-only figures based on certification alone.

=== Michael Bublé version ===
Certifications for "Holly Jolly Christmas" by Michael Bublé
Region	Certification	Certified units/sales
Denmark (IFPI Danmark)	Gold	45,000^{‡}
Italy (FIMI)	Platinum	70,000^{‡}
New Zealand (RMNZ)	Platinum	30,000^{‡}
Portugal (AFP)	Platinum	10,000^{‡}
Spain (Promusicae)	Gold	20,000^{‡}
United Kingdom (BPI)	Platinum	600,000^{‡}
Streaming
Greece (IFPI Greece)	Gold	1,000,000^{†}
^{‡} Sales+streaming figures based on certification alone.^{†} Streaming-only figures based on certification alone.
