= Jean Alexander =

English actress (1926–2016)

- Alexander as Hilda Ogden in Coronation Street
- Born: Jean Margaret Hodgkinson; 11 October 1926; Toxteth, Liverpool, England
- Died: 14 October 2016 (aged 90); Southport, Merseyside, England
- Occupation: Actress
- Years active: 1949–2010
- Known for: Role of Hilda Ogden in Coronation Street; Role of Auntie Wainwright in Last of the Summer Wine
- Television: Coronation Street (1962, 1964–1987, 1990, 1998); Last of the Summer Wine (1988–1989, 1992–2010)

Jean Margaret Hodgkinson (11 October 1926 – 14 October 2016), known by the stage name Jean Alexander, was a British actress. She was best known to television viewers for her long running role of Hilda Ogden in the soap opera Coronation Street, a role she played from 1964 until 1987, and as Auntie Wainwright in the long-running sitcom Last of the Summer Wine from 1988 to 2010. For her role in Coronation Street, she won the 1985 Royal Television Society Award for Best Performance, and received a 1988 BAFTA TV Award nomination for Best Actress.

== Early life ==
Jean Margaret Hodgkinson was born at 18 Rhiwlas Street in the Toxteth area of Liverpool, Lancashire, on 11 October 1926, to Nell and Archie Hodgkinson; her father worked as an electrician and the family lived in a terraced house with no indoor lavatory. Alexander had an elder brother, Kenneth. She aspired to become an actress from an early age, and later said that she was inspired by variety acts she saw at the Pavilion theatre in her home city. She attended St Edmund's College for Girls in Princes Park, Toxteth and as a teenager, she joined an amateur theatre group and took elocution lessons.

== Career ==
Alexander spent five years as a library assistant in Liverpool but, with a love of Shakespeare, decided to be become an actress, making her stage debut in 1949 at the Adelphi Guild Theatre in Macclesfield. She first appeared as Florrie in Sheppey by W. Somerset Maugham. She later would spend 12 years working in rep in Oldham, Stockport and York. Most of her parts were minor, and she also worked as a wardrobe mistress and stage manager. Her television debut is variously given as in the police series Z-Cars (1962) or in Deadline Midnight (1961).

=== Coronation Street ===
Alexander first appeared in Coronation Street in 1962 in a minor role as a landlady. Two years later, she returned to the programme as Hilda Ogden. She started playing the role on 8 July 1964, and left the show on 25 December 1987. Ogden became highly popular with viewers and Alexander was often identified with her character. In the 40 Years on Coronation Street special, she recounted an incident that had happened years previously: while she was shopping, a fan asked if she was Hilda. She responded in her normal accent, "I beg your pardon?" Taken aback, the fan said, "Oh, don't you talk funny!"

The British League for Hilda Ogden was established in 1979 by Sir John Betjeman, Willis Hall, Russell Harty, Laurence Olivier and Michael Parkinson, among others. In 1984, hundreds of fans sent her condolence cards after the death of her on-screen husband Stan Ogden; the actor who played him, Bernard Youens, died a few months before his character was killed off. In 1985 she received the Royal Television Society Award for her performance on Coronation Street. When she decided to leave the show in 1987, fans started "Save Hilda!" campaigns; however, many were unaware she had made her own decision to depart. Her final scenes in the programme were aired on 25 December 1987, attracting nearly 27 million viewers, the highest number in the show's history.

In 2005 the UK TVTimes poll voted her as the "Greatest Soap Opera Star of All Time". On 6 December 2010, Alexander spoke by telephone to ITV's This Morning to discuss her time on Coronation Street on the day of the drama's 50th anniversary episode.

=== Other roles ===
In 1988, Alexander made a guest appearance in the long-running BBC comedy series Last of the Summer Wine as Auntie Wainwright, the money-grabbing local junk shop owner. She returned for a second guest appearance in 1989, and finally became a series regular in 1992, remaining until the end of the series in 2010.

Her film credits include Scandal (1989) and Willie's War (1994). Alexander voiced Mrs Santa in the Robbie the Reindeer film Hooves of Fire (1999), and also appeared in Boon and as Lily in the children's series The Phoenix and the Carpet. She starred with Patricia Hodge and Lionel Jeffries in the comedy series Rich Tea and Sympathy, and appeared in the quiz show Cluedo. Later, she appeared in Barbara, Heartbeat, Where the Heart Is and The Afternoon Play.

== Personal life and death ==
Alexander never married, stating that she put her acting career first. She was a close friend of her Coronation Street husband, Bernard Youens. Her autobiography, The Other Side of the Street: The Autobiography of Jean Alexander, was published in 1989.

She lived for many years in Southport, Merseyside, and in 2009 she joined with others to campaign successfully for a temporary library in the town while the central library was being refurbished. She was a keen gardener and after her death was commemorated in the town with a memorial bench at Southport Flower Show, where she was a regular visitor.

She donated her 1955 Qualcast Panther lawnmower to the British Lawnmower Museum in the town, where it is still on display.

Alexander announced her retirement in 2012, two years after her last television appearance. Her acting career lasted for more than 60 years. She celebrated her 90th birthday on 11 October 2016, but was taken ill and died three days later in Southport Hospital.

== Filmography ==
Year	Title	Role	Notes
1961	Deadline Midnight	Mrs. Gibson	Episode: "Doggo"
1961	ITV Television Playhouse	Mrs. Harris	Episode: "Different Drum"
1961	Top Secret	Telephone Operator	Episode: "Vendetta"
1961	Winning Widows	Woman Customer	Episode: "Cash for Canada"
1962	Emergency Ward 10	Mrs. Nicholls	2 episodes
1962	In Search of the Castaways	Lady on Ship	uncredited
1962	Heart to Heart	Waitress	
1962–1963	Television Club	Mrs. Wade	28 episodes
1962–1963	Z Cars	Mrs. Cantrell / Amy Ford / Mrs. Hopkins	4 episodes
1962	Coronation Street	Mrs. Webb	2 episodes
1964–1987	Coronation Street	Hilda Ogden	1,614 episodes
1963	First Night	Mary Farley	Episode: "The Way with Reggie"
1964	Mary Barton	Mrs. Jones	2 episodes
1964	The Comedy Man	Costume Lady at Film Shoot	uncredited
1988, 1989; 1992–2010	Last of the Summer Wine	Auntie Wainwright	168 episodes
1988	Boon	Rose	Episode: "The Devil You Know"
1989	Scandal	Mrs. Keeler	
1991	Rich Tea and Sympathy	Granny Trellis	6 episodes
1992	The Good Guys	Maud Layton	Episode: "Her Finest Hour"
1993	I, Lovett	Elsie Mittens	Episode: "Baldy"
1993	Cluedo	Marjory Hunt	Episode: "The Hanged Man"
1995	Harry	Irene Paterson	1 episode
1997	Adam's Family Tree	Winifred Whisper	Episode: "Strawberry Fools Forever"
1997	The Phoenix and the Carpet	Lily	5 episodes
1999	Hooves of Fire (TV short)	Mrs. Santa (voice)	
2000–2002	Where the Heart Is	Kathleen Beresford / Joan Cotter	4 episodes
2001, 2003	Heartbeat	Lily Barton	2 episodes
2002	Barbara	Queenie Liversidge	2 episodes
2004	The Afternoon Play	Enid	Episode: "Drive"
2006	To the Sea Again (short film)	Annie	

== Awards and nominations ==
Year	Award	Category	Work	Result
1985	RTS Award	Best Actress	Coronation Street	Won
1987	BAFTA Award	Best Actress in a Leading Role	Coronation Street	Nominated
1988	TV Times Award	Best Actress	Coronation Street	Won
1988	BAFTA Award	Special Award	Coronation Street	Won
2005	TV Times Award	Greatest Soap Opera Star of All Time	Coronation Street	Won
