= Red nose =

Red nose, red noses, or rednose may refer to:

== Organizations and events ==
- Operation Red Nose, a Christmastime volunteer anti-drunk-driving ferry service
- Red Nose Day, a UK charity telethon operated by Comic Relief
- Red Nose Day, a US charity telethon operated by Comic Relief, Inc.

== Entertainment ==
- "Red Nose", a 2013 song by Sage the Gemini
- Red Nose (film), a 2003 Canadian romantic comedy film also known as Nez rouge
- Red Noses, a 1985 comedy about the black death
- "Red Nose", a 2009 song by Tech N9ne from Sickology 101

== Medicine ==
- Red nose, a physiological response
  - Alcohol intoxication, a facial feature
  - Blushing, facial feature
- Rednose, a proposed name for a mixture of components of bohemic acid

== Other ==
- A modern circus clown's red nose
- Rednose, the former callsign for Norwegian Air UK

== See also ==
- Rudolph the Red-Nosed Reindeer (disambiguation)
