= Rich Tea and Sympathy =

British television series

- Genre: Comedy drama
- Created by: David Nobbs
- Written by: David Nobbs
- Directed by: David Reynolds; Michael Simpson
- Starring: Patricia Hodge; Denis Quilley; Lionel Jeffries; Jean Alexander; Anne Reid; Ray Lonnen; Tracie Bennett; James Warrior; Claudia Bryan; Chris Garner; Lorraine Ashbourne; Sara Griffiths; Jason Flemyng
- Opening theme: "Rich Tea and Sympathy" by Patricia Hodge and Denis Quilley
- Ending theme: "Rich Tea and Sympathy" by Patricia Hodge and Denis Quilley
- Composer: Ray Russell
- Country of origin: United Kingdom
- Original language: English
- No. of series: 1
- No. of episodes: 6

Production
- Executive producer: Vernon Lawrence
- Producer: David Reynolds
- Production locations: Leeds, West Yorkshire, England, UK
- Running time: 50 minutes
- Production company: Yorkshire Television

Original release
- Network: ITV
- Release: 5 July – 9 August 1991

Related
- A Bit of a Do

Rich Tea and Sympathy is a British comedy-drama series written and created by David Nobbs. The show starred Patricia Hodge and Denis Quilley. It was produced by Yorkshire Television for one series and six episodes and aired on the ITV network between 5 July and 9 August 1991.

== Plot ==
The series follows a divorced mother Julia Merrygrove (Patricia Hodge) has two teenage children and works as a local councillor whilst also holding down a job in a biscuit factory. Julia begins an affair with George Rudge (Denis Quilley), her opposite number on the council.

== Cast ==
- Patricia Hodge as Julia Merrygrove
- Denis Quilley as George Rudge
- Lionel Jeffries as Grandpa Rudge
- Jean Alexander as Granny Trellis
- Anne Reid as Sally
- Ray Lonnen as Steve Merrygrove
- Tracie Bennett as Nikki
- James Warrior as Colin Pink
- Claudia Bryan as Samantha Merrygrove
- Chris Garner as Warren Rudge
- Lorraine Ashbourne as Karen Rudge
- Sara Griffiths as Tracey Rudge
- Jason Flemyng as John Merrygrove

== Episodes ==
No.	Title	Directed by	Written by	Original release date
1	"Sex & Snooker"	David Reynolds	David Nobbs	5 July 1991
Julia and George fall in love despite being at opposite ends of the political spectrum and problems created by their respective family members.
2	"Poppadoms & Peeping Toms"	Michael Simpson	David Nobbs	12 July 1991
Julia and George have to deal with their differing temperaments as well as a peeping tom, love-sick employees, Indian and Chinese waiters, religious fanatics and more.
3	"Socks & Self-Denial"	Michael Simpson	David Nobbs	19 July 1991
Julia and George organise a dinner party to bring the families together.
4	"Vegetable Samosas & Virgins"	Michael Simpson	David Nobbs	26 July 1991
Julia and George try to bring peace to their families, while Mr Pink and Sally contribute with a disastrous Indian meal.
5	"Sinners & Sea Bass"	David Reynolds	David Nobbs	2 August 1991
Julia and George try to get away from it all.
6	"Waiters & Whoopee Cushions"	David Reynolds	David Nobbs	9 August 1991
Julia's family thought she needed a man to improve her temper, while George's family believed he needed a woman to improve his cooking.

== Reception ==
Following on from his enormous success with A Bit of a Do, David Nobbs created Rich Tea and Sympathy, a story of love and politics.

== Home media ==
The complete series was released on DVD by Network in a two-disc set on 3 September 2007.
