= Robert L. May =

American retailer and writer (1905–1976)

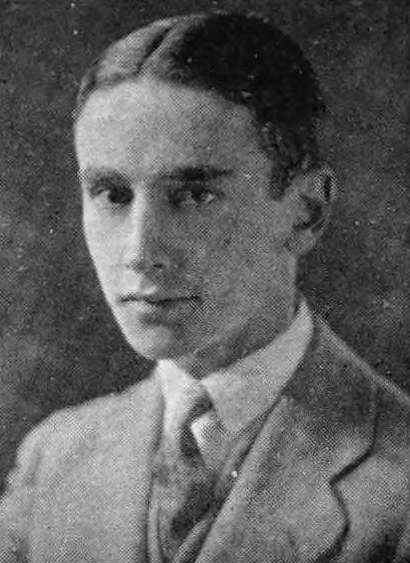
- May in the Dartmouth College yearbook, 1926
- Born: Robert Lewis May; July 27, 1905; Arverne, New York, U.S.
- Died: August 11, 1976 (aged 71); Evanston, Illinois, U.S.
- Known for: Creating Rudolph the Red-Nosed Reindeer
- Spouses: Evelyn Ruth Heymann (m. 1927; died 1939) Virginia Newton May (m. 1941; died 1971) Claire Newton Sims (m. 1972)
- Children: 6

Robert Lewis May (July 27, 1905 – August 11, 1976) was an American retailer. He was best known for creating the fictional character Rudolph the Red-Nosed Reindeer.

== Early life ==
Robert Lewis May was born in Arverne, Long Island, New York, and grew up in a fairly affluent secular Jewish home in New Rochelle, New York. His parents were members of the Ethical Culture Society, which believed that morality is independent of theology. May grew up having no religious preference. He had a brother and two sisters. One of his sisters, Evelyn May, was the grandmother of economist Steven D. Levitt, who wrote the book Freakonomics. His other sister, Margaret, married songwriter Johnny Marks in 1947.

After graduating from Mayflower Elementary School in New Rochelle, New York in 1917, May attended Riverside Country Day School in Greenwich, Connecticut for one year. He went on to graduate from New Rochelle High School in 1922, and from Dartmouth College in 1926, where he was a member of Phi Beta Kappa, and received his A.B. magna cum laude. At Dartmouth, May majored in psychology, and was exposed to the work of Alfred Adler, whose thesis was that the basic human motivation is a striving for perfection and self-assertion that stems from a desire to overcome feelings of inferiority. Adler's impact on May is strongly suggested by the fact that several of the children's stories he later wrote involved a hero striving to overcome a physical handicap that had produced a deep sense of inferiority.

Upon leaving Dartmouth, May was hired as a copywriter by R.H. Macy & Co. (now Macy's), the New York City department store. In 1927, he moved to Omaha, Nebraska, where he worked two years as advertising manager for J. L. Brandeis & Co. department store. During that time, May married Evelyn Ruth Heymann of New York City. She was a 1923 graduate of the Ethical Culture School in New York and a 1927 graduate of Radcliffe College. The marriage took place in Chicago on November 29, 1928. The following year, they moved to Atlanta, Georgia, where he worked for a year as advertising manager at Rich's department store. In 1930, they returned to New York City where May was hired as assistant sales manager for Butterick Company. In the summer of 1932, the Great Depression cost him his job. His parents were likewise hard hit by the Depression: his father Milton's business, the May Lumber Co., was forced to close and the family lost most of their wealth.

May had some difficulty finding a new job, but in 1933, he was hired as advertising manager and copywriter for Gimbel Brothers department store in New York City. At the end of the following year, Evelyn gave birth to their daughter Barbara. Early in 1936, May resigned from Gimbel's in order to move to Chicago where he took on a low-paying job as in-house advertising copywriter for Montgomery Ward. He would work for Montgomery Ward for most of the next 24 years. Throughout these years, Evelyn worked full time as a social worker, while also studying at Columbia University's New York School of Social Work and teaching part-time at Northwestern University.

== The beginning of Rudolph ==
Early in 1939, May's boss at Montgomery Ward asked him to write a "cheery children's book" for Christmas shoppers, suggesting "it should be an animal story, with a character like Ferdinand the Bull", which was then recently released as a short film by Walt Disney. Prior to that time, Montgomery Ward had been buying and giving away coloring books for Christmas, but it was decided that creating a book of its own would save money and be a nice good-will gesture. This request came at a difficult time in May's life. Evelyn was dying of cancer and he was struggling to support his family and pay for her medical treatments on a salary of $5,000/year (equivalent to $115,730 in 2025). As May would later write, "I was heavily in debt at age 35, still grinding out catalogue copy. Instead of writing the great American novel, as I'd always hoped, I was describing men's white shirts."

In writing the Christmas giveaway, May decided to make a reindeer the central character of the book because it was a Christmas animal. It had to be a sort of "ugly duckling" who had a lot of heart to make it with Santa. He "drew on memories of his own painfully shy childhood when creating his Rudolph story." He and his then four-year-old daughter Barbara, together with Montgomery Ward artist Denver Gillen, visited Chicago's Lincoln Park Zoo one Saturday to get a better idea of what Rudolph might look like. Working at home and in his spare time at the office, May wrote the book in about 50 hours. As he finished drafting each part, he would read it to Barbara. When Evelyn died on July 28, 1939, May's boss offered to relieve him of the project and have someone else finish it but May declined and finished the poem in late August. On the day of its completion, "I called Barbara and her grandparents into the living room and read it to them. In their eyes, I could see that the story accomplished what I had hoped."

This softcover Rudolph poem booklet was first distributed by Montgomery Ward during the 1939 holiday season. Shoppers loved it and 2.4 million copies were distributed. Wartime restrictions on paper use prevented a re-issue until 1946. In that year, Montgomery Ward gave away another 3.6 million softcover copies to its shoppers.

On May 29, 1941, May married Virginia Newton, a secretary at Montgomery Ward. She had completed one year at Mundelein College in Chicago before having to drop out during the Depression. She was an accomplished artist and took classes at the Art Institute of Chicago. May and Virginia had five children: Joanna, Christopher, Virginia, Martha and Elizabeth.

In 1946, May received an offer from RCA Victor, which wanted to do a spoken-word record of the poem. He could not give his approval, however, because Montgomery Ward held the rights to his poem. At the encouragement of Wilbur H. Norton, a company vice-president, Ward's president, Sewell Avery, gave May the copyright to the poem, free and clear. The transfer did not take effect until January 1, 1947, so that Montgomery Ward could again distribute the book as a 1946 Christmas giveaway.

May had difficulty finding a publisher for what was now his Rudolph the Red-Nosed Reindeer poem book. "Nobody wanted him, not with 6 million copies already distributed. Finally I found a publisher, a little guy with a big nose, who said he knew what it was like for Rudolph and was willing to take a chance on a printing." The little guy was Harry Elbaum, head of Maxton Publishers, a small New York company that he had put together in 1945. Maxton published the first commercial edition of Rudolph just in time for the 1947 Christmas season. He printed 100,000 copies of the now hardcover book, which sold for 50 cents, and was a great success. The same was true of RCA Victor's 45-rpm spoken-word version of the poem, narrated by Paul Wing with music by George Kleinsinger. A number of other Rudolph products were also put on the market that year, including a stuffed reindeer toy, picture-puzzle books, and children's slippers.

== Rudolph spreads in popularity ==
In 1948, May persuaded his brother-in-law Johnny Marks to write the words and music for a musical adaptation of Rudolph. Though the song was initially turned down by such popular vocalists as Bing Crosby and Dinah Shore, it was finally recorded in 1949 by Gene Autry, whose wife persuaded him to sing it. The song became a phenomenal success, recorded by many famous artists, including Mitch Miller, Dean Martin, and Perry Como—and eventually even Crosby. It became the second-most popular Christmas tune of all time, surpassed only by "White Christmas".

Rudolph soon became part of the American culture. At the end of 1950, the Chicago Tribune wrote: "There is no question but that Rudolph has become a legend—the first new and accepted Christmas legend since Charles Dickens' 'A Christmas Carol,' and Clement Moore's 'A Visit from St. Nicholas.'" Six years later, a book on Christmas in the U.S. noted: "The tale of Rudolph the Red-Nosed Reindeer is a very important addition to the folk celebration of Christmas. It has become popular in a short time, and there are signs that this 'rejected' deer will be fused with Santa Claus in Christmas lore."

During the 1950s, more than one hundred different Rudolph products were licensed and produced. In 1951, as managing Rudolph increasingly became a full-time job, May created his own company, Rudolph the Red-Nosed Reindeer Enterprises, and resigned from Ward's. But by 1958, Rudolph sales had declined considerably. May had earned a fair amount in Rudolph's early days, but the top federal income tax rate in the 1950s was 91 or 92 percent for individuals, and 72 percent for corporations. The result was that less than seven years after he had quit the company, May returned to Ward's as a copyeditor, "remind[ing] them of company policy: 'Ward's will take anything back!'" He remained at Ward's until he retired in 1970.

May wrote two sequels to Rudolph the Red-Nosed Reindeer. The first, Rudolph's Second Christmas, was a 1951 RCA Victor phonograph album narrated by Paul Wing; it did not appear in book form until 1992, long after May had died. The story is mostly in prose (except that Rudolph speaks in anapestic tetrameter). It was later republished as Rudolph to the Rescue (2006). The second sequel, Rudolph, the Red-Nosed Reindeer, Shines Again, published in 1954, is entirely in anapestic tetrameter, like the original Rudolph. In addition to these sequels, a prose adaptation of the original story was published as a Little Golden Book in 1958.

Rudolph became popular in Europe, Australia and Canada, and achieved limited acceptance in some Latin American countries where Santa Claus is not a traditional part of the Christmas season. The Rudolph story has appeared in several foreign editions. In addition to an English version put out in Britain, a Danish edition was published in Copenhagen in 1951, under the title Rensydret Rudolf med den Røde Tud. Several French editions were published in Paris, under the title Le Petit Renne au Nez Rouge. Because of the German origin of the name Rudolph, the hero remained nameless in the early French editions, but in a 1975 edition, the hero had the name Nicolas. A licensed comic books series published by DC Comics appeared as annual issues from 1950 and 1962, and again from 1972 through 1980.

In addition to his Rudolph stories, May published several other children's books: Benny the Bunny Liked Beans (1940); Winking Willie (1948); and Sam the Scared-est Scarecrow (1972). None of these came close to matching the success of Rudolph.

== Legacy of Rudolph ==
There have been a number of film adaptations of Rudolph. The first, an eight-minute animated film directed by Max Fleischer and narrated by Paul Wing, was a 1948 promotional piece made by Montgomery Ward. It showed at the Radio City Music Hall and in hundreds of theatres around the country. In 1964, Rankin/Bass Productions produced an animated television film, Rudolph the Red-Nosed Reindeer, which employed stop-motion animation known as "Animagic". It was a remarkable success and is the longest-running television special in American history. In 1975, Rankin/Bass made a second Rudolph television film, an animated fantasy entitled Rudolph's Shiny New Year, which aired in 1976. And in 1979, Rankin/Bass produced and released Rudolph and Frosty's Christmas in July, an animated feature-length movie. Several other feature-length Rudolph films have appeared over the years. Rudolph the Red-Nosed Reindeer: The Movie, was released by GoodTimes Entertainment and Golden Books Family Entertainment in 1998. Three years later, GoodTimes produced an animated sequel, Rudolph the Red-Nosed Reindeer and the Island of Misfit Toys.

On November 6, 2014, 75 years after May created the character, and 50 years after the first Rankin/Bass film, the U.S. Postal Service honored Rudolph by issuing four stamps that featured characters from the Rankin/Bass production.

== Personal life and death ==
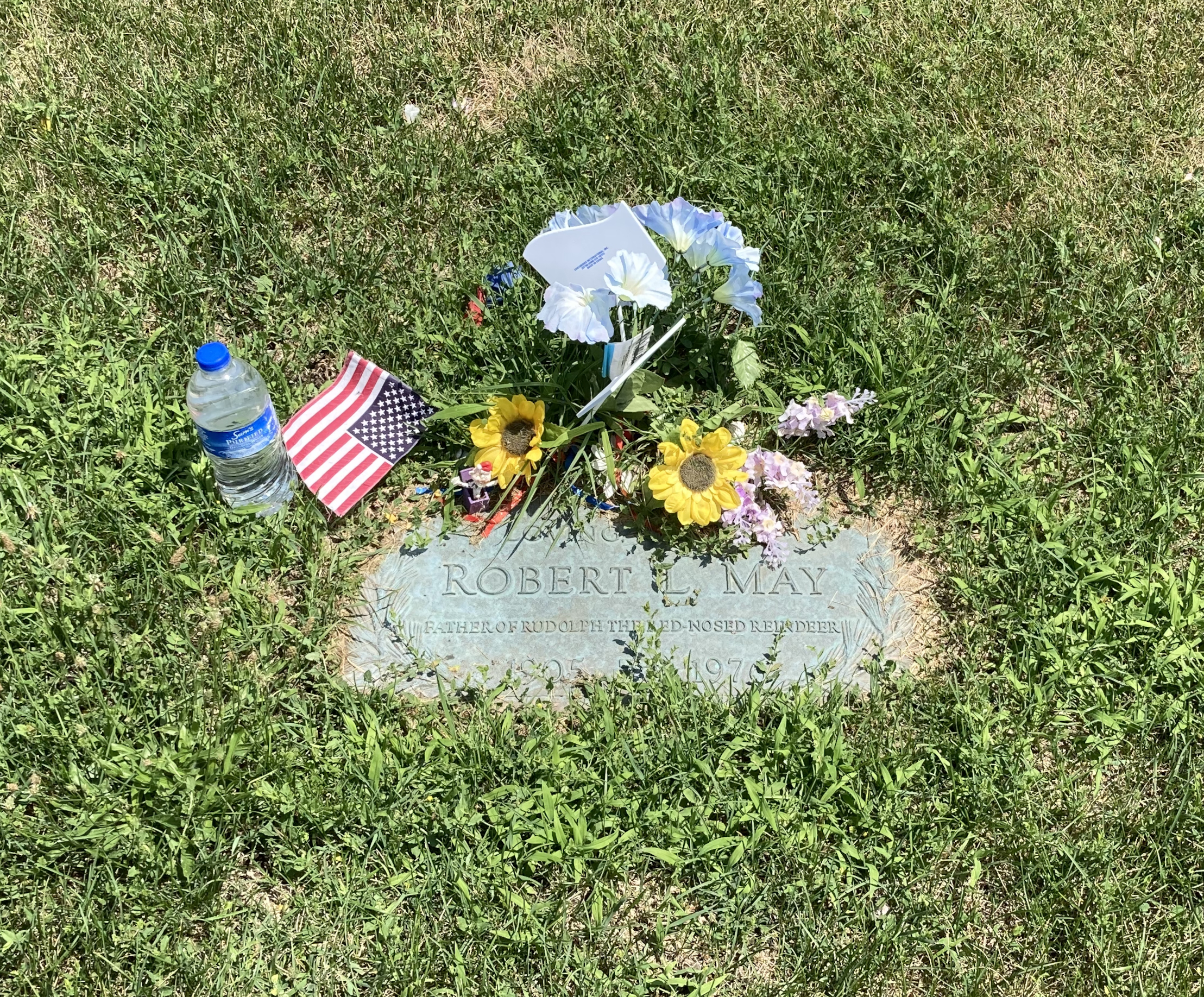
May's grave at Saint Joseph Cemetery

May was an accomplished bridge player and an avid sports fan. From 1930 to 1934, he was a ghostwriter for the nationally syndicated bridge columnist Milton C. Work. His other avocations included bowling, golf, and growing 15-foot (4.6-metre)-tall tomato plants that reached the second story of his house. The tomatoes weighed as much as two pounds. May was active in civic affairs, planning and writing the City of Chicago's Community Fund Campaign in 1941, 1942 and 1945. He was a member of the Optimist Club of Evanston, and volunteered with the Evanston Council of the Boy Scouts of America and other local organizations.

May's second wife, Virginia, a devout Catholic, died on April 7, 1971. The following year, he fulfilled one of her wishes by converting to Catholicism. On July 25, 1972, he married Virginia's sister, Claire (Newton) Sims, in Albuquerque, New Mexico.

May died in Evanston, Illinois, on August 11, 1976. He is interred at Saint Joseph Cemetery, River Grove, Illinois.

== See also ==
- List of converts to Catholicism
- List of poets from the United States
