= Paul Wing =

Assistant Director

- Born: August 14, 1892
- Died: May 29, 1957 (aged 64); Portsmouth, Virginia, USA
- Occupation: Assistant director
- Years active: 1927–1935

Paul Wing (August 14, 1892 – May 29, 1957) was an assistant director at Paramount Pictures. He won the 1935 Best Assistant Director Academy Award for The Lives of a Bengal Lancer along with Clem Beauchamp. Wing was the assistant director on only two films owing to his service in the U.S. Army. During his service, Wing was in a prisoner of war camp that was portrayed in the film The Great Raid (2005).

== Career ==
Early in his adult life, Wing worked as a reporter on the Chicago Tribune, after which he began working on radio. His responsibilities included writing scripts for Fred Allen and Phil Baker. In the early 1930s, he became an announcer and had his own 15-minute program, Paul Wing the Story Man, on NBC radio. By 1936, the program was available in syndication by NBC's Thesaurus transcription service. Wing was also NBC's director of children's programs. As "NBC's spelling master" he also had the Spelling Bee program, which began on NBC-Red in 1937.

In the mid-1940s, Wing made children's recordings for RCA Victor. A 1949 recording of the story The Little Engine That Could narrated by Wing was inducted to the National Recording Registry in 2009.

Wing was captured by the Japanese in the Philippines in 1942. He survived the Bataan Death March and was later rescued in the Raid at Cabanatuan by U.S. Army Rangers and Filipino guerillas, a story told in The Great Raid (2005). Paul Wing died in May 1957, in a veteran's hospital in Portsmouth, Virginia, following a coronary.

== Filmography ==
- Stark Love (1927)
- The Lives of a Bengal Lancer (1935; won Academy Award)
- Rudolph the Red-Nosed Reindeer (1948; voice only)
