= Rudolph the Red-Nosed Reindeer: The Movie =

1998 animated film by William R. Kowalchuk

- Theatrical release poster
- Directed by: William R. Kowalchuk
- Screenplay by: Michael Aschner
- Story by: Robert May
- Based on: Rudolph the Red-Nosed Reindeer
- Produced by: William R. Kowalchuk
- Starring: John Goodman; Kathleen Barr; Eric Idle; Whoopi Goldberg; Debbie Reynolds; Richard Simmons; Bob Newhart
- Edited by: Tom Hok
- Music by: Al Kasha and Michael Lloyd (score); Johnny Marks Al Kasha and Michael Lloyd (songs)
- Production companies: GoodTimes Entertainment; Golden Books Family Entertainment; Tundra Productions
- Distributed by: Legacy Releasing
- Release date: October 16, 1998
- Running time: 92 minutes
- Country: United States
- Language: English
- Budget: $10 million
- Box office: $113,484

Rudolph the Red-Nosed Reindeer: The Movie is a 1998 American animated christmas film about the character of the same name, who first appeared in a 1939 story by Robert L. May. This film is the only theatrical feature from GoodTimes Entertainment, long known as a home video company. It stars Kathleen Barr as the voice of the titular Rudolph, and also features celebrity voice talents including John Goodman, Eric Idle, Whoopi Goldberg, Debbie Reynolds, Richard Simmons and Bob Newhart. The film was released on October 16, 1998, it underperformed at the box-office, recouping only $113,484 of its $10 million budget from its theatrical release.

== Plot ==
One night, the Sprites of the Northern Lights – a group of singing sprites who fly around the North Pole – witness the birth of a baby reindeer named Rudolph, who has an unusual red, shiny nose. Later, Rudolph and his parents, Blitzen and Mitzi, meet up with Rudolph's three uncles – Dasher, Comet, and Cupid. Cupid tickles Rudolph and triggers his glowing nose, which draws attention and causes Rudolph to be mocked. Meanwhile, two of Santa Claus's elves, Doggle and Boone, cross the ice bridge of the wicked Ice Queen, Stormella, accidentally destroying several ice statues while delivering Santa's mail. When Stormella finds out, she demands Santa hand them over to her. When he refuses, she closes her bridge as punishment and warns that if anyone crosses it, she will create a blizzard so strong it will stop Santa from delivering presents to children around the world on Christmas Eve.

A year later, Rudolph starts school, where he is ridiculed by everyone including his mean-spirited cousin and Cupid's son, Arrow for wanting to be among Santa's reindeer, the Flyers, just like his own father, despite his nose. The only ones who don't tease him are his teacher, Mrs. Prancer and a young doe named Zoey (who is later revealed to be in a relationship with Arrow). After running away from school, Santa meets Rudolph and reassures him that his nose is grand and that to be a Flyer, a reindeer needs to have a true heart, a trait that he sees in Rudolph.

Years later, a teenage Rudolph takes part in the Junior Reindeer Games, for selecting new Flyers for Santa. During a sleigh race event, Arrow, determined to be noticed by Santa, causes the other competitors to crash and then tries to distract Rudolph by claiming that Zoey is only nice to him because she pities him, making Rudolph's nose glow in anger and accidentally blind Arrow. Though Rudolph wins, he is unjustly disqualified for blinding Arrow, and Arrow wins by default. Zoey angrily confronts Arrow and ends their relationship. As Blitzen tries to defend his son's actions towards the rude referee elf, an eavesdropping Rudolph misinterprets his father's statements as an admission of shame towards him, and decides to run away from home.

At night, unknowingly with the help and guidance of the Sprites, Rudolph journeys across the North Pole, and eventually befriends an Arctic fox named Slyly and later, a polar bear named Leonard. Meanwhile, Zoey learns that Rudolph ran away from home, and runs off to search for him. She eventually comes across Stormella's bridge the next morning and decides to cross it despite the consequences, only to be caught and imprisoned by Stormella. Santa sends Boone and Doggle to search for Rudolph and Zoey. Rudolph meets the Sprites, who teach him how to use his nose properly and inform him of Zoey's capture. Rudolph, Leonard, and Slyly journey to Stormella's castle, but upon arrival, Slyly stays behind out of fear of Stormella's pet wolves while Rudolph and Leonard enter.

After Rudolph and Leonard are captured and imprisoned by Stormella, she unleashes a massive blizzard upon the North Pole. After Stormella goes to sleep, Slyly, having gained some courage, sneaks into her bedroom and retrieves a key that unlocks the prison cells. However, Stormella wakes up, realizes this and sends her pack of wolves after Rudolph and his friends, who eventually corner them on a cliff. When she threatens to freeze Zoey first, Rudolph uses his nose to blind Stormella, sending her toppling over the cliff and hanging on for dear life. Rudolph and the others then save Stormella, and she gratefully offers to grant him a wish. Much to the Ice Queen's dismay, Rudolph wishes that Stormella would be nice.

Though the wish takes full effect, Stormella is unable to stop the snowstorm that she created. Boone and Doggle later find and bring the entire group back to Santa's Village. Because of the blizzard, Santa is unable to carry out his flight this year, but when he sees Rudolph's glowing nose, Santa asks him to lead his team of Flyers while officially appointing him a true Flyer as well. Rudolph guides Santa's sleigh through the storm, and receives a hero's welcome from his family (including a reformed Arrow), friends and the other villagers when he returns.

== Cast ==
- Kathleen Barr as Rudolph and Twinkle the Sprite
  - Michael Lloyd provides Rudolph's singing voice
  - Eric Pospisil as Young Rudolph
- John Goodman as Santa Claus
- Eric Idle as Slyly the Arctic fox
- Bob Newhart as Leonard the polar bear
- Myriam Sirois as Zoey (Rudolph's love interest and Arrow's former love interest), Glitter the Sprite, and Schoolroom Doe
  - Debbie Lytton provides Zoey's singing voice
  - Vanessa Morley as Young Zoey
- Whoopi Goldberg as Stormella
  - Carmen Twillie provides Stormella's singing voice
- Garry Chalk as Blitzen (Rudolph's father)
- Debbie Reynolds as Mitzi (Rudolph's mother), Mrs. Claus, and Mrs. Prancer (Prancer's wife and the teacher)
- Richard Simmons as Boone
- Alec Willows as Doggle and Prancer
- Lee Tockar as Ridley, Vixen, and Milo
- Matt Hill as Arrow (Cupid's son and Rudolph's cousin and rival) and Donner
  - Christopher Gray as Young Arrow
- Elizabeth Carol Savenkoff as Aurora the Sprite and Zoey's mother
- Cathy Weseluck as Sparkle the Sprite
- Paul Dobson as Dasher (Rudolph and Arrow's uncle)
- Terry Klassen as Dancer
- Colin Murdock as Comet (Rudolph and Arrow's uncle)
- David Kaye as Cupid (Arrow's father and Rudolph's uncle)
- Tyler Thompson as Schoolroom Buck

== Production ==
By early 1997, GoodTimes Entertainment was attached to produce a $10 million animated feature of Rudolph the Red-Nosed Reindeer as their first theatrical release with Golden Books Family Entertainment. Golden Books acquired Broadway Video which included rights to the 1964 Rudolph the Red-Nosed Reindeer TV special and also planned to published new Rudolph books to tie-in with the release of the new film.

Scott McNeil was originally the voice of Slyly and Leonard, and had recorded all of their lines, but was replaced with Eric Idle and Bob Newhart respectively for unknown reasons.

== Music ==
Academy Award-winning songwriter Al Kasha and music producer Michael Lloyd composed the film's soundtrack. Original songs written for the film include "What About His Nose", "Christmas Town", "Santa's Family", "Show Me the Light", "It Could Be Worse", "I Hate Santa Claus", "We Can Make It", and "The Sprites' Songs". The score also includes arrangements of the classic song on which this film is based, "Rudolph the Red-Nosed Reindeer". In addition, the soundtrack includes "Wonderful Christmastime" by Paul McCartney, played during Santa's takeoff scene.

=== Songs ===
Original songs performed in the film include:

No.	Title	Performer(s)	Length
1.	"Rudolph the Red-Nosed Reindeer"	Clint Black
2.	"What About His Nose"	Chorus
3.	"Christmas Town"	The Pointer Sisters
4.	"Santa's Family"	John Goodman
5.	"Wonderful Christmastime"	Paul McCartney
6.	"Show Me the Light (Love Theme)"	Michael Lloyd & Debbie Lytton
7.	"It Could Be Worse"	Eric Idle
8.	"I Hate Santa Claus"	Carmen Twillie
9.	"We Can Make It"	Johnny Tillotson, Tommy Roe & Brian Hyland
10.	"Rudolph the Red-Nosed Reindeer (Reprise)"	Chorus
11.	"Show Me the Light (Reprise)"	Bill Medley & Jennifer Warnes
12.	"The Sprites' Songs"	Debbie Lytton

== Reception ==
Rudolph the Red-Nosed Reindeer: The Movie received mixed reviews. Rotten Tomatoes gave the film a 40% approval rating, based on five reviews.

== Books ==
In 1998, four books based on the film were released:

- Rudolph the Red-Nosed Reindeer: A Retelling of the New Animated Movie, which was based on the film's plot.
- Rudolph Saves the Sprites, which served as a sequel and saw Rudolph and Zoey searching for the missing Sprites of the Northern Lights.
- Rudolph's Special Day in Santa's Workshop, which features an infant Rudolph getting a tour of Santa's Workshop.
- Christmas Town: Rudolph's Sing-A-Long Book, featuring lyrics to the film's songs.

== See also ==
- List of Christmas films
- Santa Claus in film
