= Johnny Marks =

American songwriter (1909–1985)

- Born: John David Marks; November 10, 1909; Mount Vernon, New York, U.S.
- Died: September 3, 1985 (aged 75); New York, New York, U.S.
- Education: McBurney School; Colgate University; Columbia University
- Occupations: Songwriter; composer
- Spouse: Margaret May
- Children: 3
- Relatives: Robert L. May (brother-in-law); Marcus M. Marks (uncle); Steven Levitt (grand nephew)
- Military career
- Branch: United States Army
- Rank: Captain
- Unit: 26th Special Service Company
- Conflicts: World War II
- Awards: Bronze Star Medal

John David Marks (November 10, 1909 – September 3, 1985) was an American songwriter. He specialized in Christmas songs and wrote many holiday standards, including "Rudolph the Red-Nosed Reindeer" (a hit for Gene Autry and others), "Rockin' Around the Christmas Tree" (a hit for Brenda Lee), "A Holly Jolly Christmas" (recorded by the Quinto Sisters and later by Burl Ives), "Silver and Gold" (for Burl Ives), and "I Heard the Bells on Christmas Day" (introduced by Bing Crosby).

== Personal life ==
Marks was born to a Jewish family in Mount Vernon, New York. He began writing songs when he was 13. A graduate of McBurney School in New York, N.Y., Colgate University, and Columbia University, Marks later studied in Paris. He earned a Bronze Star and four Battle Stars as an Army Captain in the 26th Special Service Company during World War II. Marks had three children: Michael, Laura, and David. Marks was the great-uncle of economist Steven Levitt.

Marks' father, Louis B. Marks (1869-1939), was a leading illumination (lighting) engineer. His wife, Margaret May Marks, was the sister of Robert L. May, who wrote the original story of Rudolph. Marks was the nephew of Marcus M. Marks, a business figure who served as Borough President of Manhattan.

Marks lived on West 11th Street in Greenwich Village and is buried in Woodlawn Cemetery in The Bronx, New York City. He died on September 3, 1985, of complications from diabetes.

== Career ==
Among Marks's many works is "Rudolph, the Red-Nosed Reindeer", which was based on a poem of the same name by Marks's brother-in-law, Robert L. May, Rudolph's creator. A television film based on the story and song first aired in 1964, with Marks composing the score. He felt pigeonholed by the success of the song; he felt that his best song was "I Heard the Bells on Christmas Day“, which set the Henry Wadsworth Longfellow 1864 poem "Christmas Bells" to music.

In addition to his songwriting, Marks founded St. Nicholas Music in 1949, and served as director of ASCAP from 1957 to 1961. In 1981, he was inducted into the Songwriters Hall of Fame.

Marks appeared as an imposter on the December 11, 1961, episode of the game show To Tell The Truth. Impersonating the owner of a herd of reindeer, he received two of the four votes. After the true contestant was revealed, Marks identified himself as the composer of "Rudolph the Red-Nosed Reindeer".

== Works (incomplete list) ==
=== Christmas songs ===
- Rudolph, the Red-Nosed Reindeer – 1949 (inspired by a poem by Robert L. May, Marks's brother-in-law)
- I Don't Want a Lot for Christmas - 1950
- When Santa Claus Gets Your Letter – 1952
- The Night Before Christmas Song – 1952
- An Old-Fashioned Christmas – 1952
- Everyone's a Child at Christmas – 1956
- I Heard the Bells on Christmas Day – 1956 (words by Henry Wadsworth Longfellow, adapted by Marks)
- Run Rudolph Run - 1958 (words and music were written solely by Chuck Berry, Marks received the writing credit due to his trademark of the Rudolph character)
- Rockin' Around the Christmas Tree – 1958
- A Merry, Merry Christmas to You – 1959
- The Santa Claus Parade – 1959
- A Caroling We Go - 1966
- Joyous Christmas - 1969
- A Holly Jolly Christmas – 1965 (separate single release), 1964-65**
- Jingle, Jingle, Jingle – 1964
- The Most Wonderful Day of the Year – 1964
- Silver and Gold – 1964-65**
- We Are Santa's Elves – 1964
- There's Always Tomorrow - 1964
- The Island of Misfit Toys - 1964
- We're a Couple of Misfits - 1964

** Burl Ives released "A Holly Jolly Christmas" and "Silver and Gold," two songs he sang as his character Sam the Snowman, as singles for the 1965 holiday season, the year after the TV production.

From the 1975 DePatie-Freling TV Production The Tiny Tree

- To Love And Be Loved - 1975
- When Autumn Comes - 1975
- Tell It to a Turtle - 1975
- A Caroling We Go - 1966
- A Merry Merry Christmas To You - 1959
- Joyous Christmas - 1969

From the 1976 ABC/Rankin-Bass TV Production Rudolph's Shiny New Year

- The Moving Finger Writes – 1976
- Turn Back The Years – 1976
- It's Raining Sunshine – 1976
- What A Wonderful World We Live In - 1976
- Fourth Of July Parade - 1976
- Have A Little Faith In Me - 1976
- Have a Happy New Year - 1976

=== Other ===
- Happy New Year Darling – 1946 (with J. Carmen Lombardo)
- Address Unknown
- Chicken Today and Feathers Tomorrow
- Don't Cross Your Fingers, Cross Your Heart
- Free
- How Long Is Forever?
- I Guess There's an End to Everything
- Neglected
- She'll Always Remember
- Summer Holiday
- We Speak of You Often
- What've You Got to Lose But Your Heart
- Who Calls?
