= Rudolph the Red-Nosed Reindeer =

Fictional reindeer created by Robert L. May

- Cover of one of the books of the Robert L. May story by Maxton Publishers, Inc.
- First appearance: 1939
- Created by: Robert L. May
- Voiced by: Billie Mae Richards (TV specials, 1964–1979); Kathleen Barr (Rudolph the Red-Nosed Reindeer: The Movie, Rudolph the Red-Nosed Reindeer and the Island of Misfit Toys)

In-universe information
- Nicknames: Rudolph in Rudolph the Red-Nosed Reindeer: The Movie: Red, Rudy, Rudy The Red-Nosed Reject, Neon-Nose
- Species: Reindeer
- Gender: Male
- Title: The Red-Nosed Reindeer
- Family: Donner and Mrs. Donner (parents in 1964 TV special); Blitzen (father in 1998 film); Mitzi (mother in 1998 film); Rusty (brother in Holidaze); Arrow (cousin in 1998 film); Comet, Cupid and Dasher (uncles in 1998 film); Robbie (son in Robbie the Reindeer)

Rudolph the Red-Nosed Reindeer is a fictional reindeer created in 1939 by Robert L. May. Rudolph is usually depicted as the ninth and youngest of Santa Claus's reindeer, using his luminous red nose to guide the reindeer team as the leader of Santa's sleigh on Christmas Eve. Though he initially receives ridicule for his nose as a fawn, the brightness of his nose is so powerful that it illuminates the team's path through harsh winter weather. Ronald D. Lankford, Jr., described Rudolph's story as "the fantasy story made to order for American children: each child has the need to express and receive approval for their individuality and special qualities. Rudolph's story embodies the American Dream for the child, writ large because of the cultural significance of Christmas."

Rudolph first appeared in a 1939 booklet written by May and published by Montgomery Ward, the department store.

The story is owned by The Rudolph Company, LP and has been adapted into numerous forms including the song by Johnny Marks, the television special Rudolph the Red-Nosed Reindeer, Rudolph's Shiny New Year, and Rudolph and Frosty's Christmas in July from Rankin/Bass Productions, as well as Rudolph the Red-Nosed Reindeer: The Movie and Rudolph the Red-Nosed Reindeer and the Island of Misfit Toys from GoodTimes Entertainment. Character Arts, LLC manages the licensing for the Rudolph Company, LP and DreamWorks Classics. In many countries, Rudolph has become a figure of Christmas folklore. 2014 marked the 75th anniversary of the character and the 50th anniversary of the Rankin/Bass television special. A series of postage stamps featuring Rudolph was issued by the United States Postal Service on November 6, 2014.

== Publication history ==
Robert L. May created Rudolph in 1939 as an assignment for Chicago-based Montgomery Ward. The retailer had been buying and giving away booklets for Christmas every year and it was decided that creating their own book would save money. May considered naming the reindeer Rollo or Reginald before deciding upon using the name Rudolph. May chose a reindeer because of his daughter's love of the deer at Lincoln Park Zoo in Chicago, IL. May also said he was treated like Rudolph as a child. In its first year of publication, Montgomery Ward distributed 2.4 million copies of Rudolph's story. The story is written as a poem in anapestic tetrameter, the same meter as "A Visit from St. Nicholas" (also known as "'Twas the Night Before Christmas"). Publication and reprint rights for the book Rudolph the Red-Nosed Reindeer are controlled by Pearson PLC.

While May was staring out his office window in downtown Chicago, pondering how best to craft a Christmas story about a reindeer, a thick fog from Lake Michigan blocked his view—giving him a flash of inspiration. "Suddenly I had it!" he recalled. "A nose! A bright red nose that would shine through fog like a spotlight."

The cultural significance of a red nose has changed since the story's publication. In 1930's popular culture, a bright red nose was closely associated with chronic alcoholism and drunkards, so the story idea was initially rejected. May asked his illustrator friend at Montgomery Ward, Denver Gillen, to draw "cute reindeer", using zoo deer as models. The alert, bouncy character Gillen developed convinced management to support the idea.

Maxton Books published the first mass-market edition of Rudolph in 1947. The copyright for it will expire in 2034. A sequel, Rudolph the Red-Nosed Reindeer Shines Again, was published in 1954. In 1992, Applewood Books published Rudolph's Second Christmas, an unpublished sequel that Robert May wrote in 1947. In 2003, Penguin Books issued a reprint version of the original Rudolph the Red-Nosed Reindeer with new artwork by Lisa Papp. Penguin also reprinted May's sequels, Rudolph Shines Again and Rudolph's Second Christmas (now retitled Rudolph to the Rescue).

== Story ==
The story chronicles the experiences of Rudolph, a youthful reindeer buck who possesses an unusual luminous red nose. Mocked and excluded by his peers because of this trait, Rudolph proves himself one Christmas Eve with poor visibility due to inclement weather. After Santa Claus catches sight of Rudolph's nose and asks Rudolph to lead his sleigh for the evening, Rudolph agrees and is finally favored by his fellow reindeer for his heroism and accomplishment.

== In media ==
=== Theatrical cartoon short (1948) ===
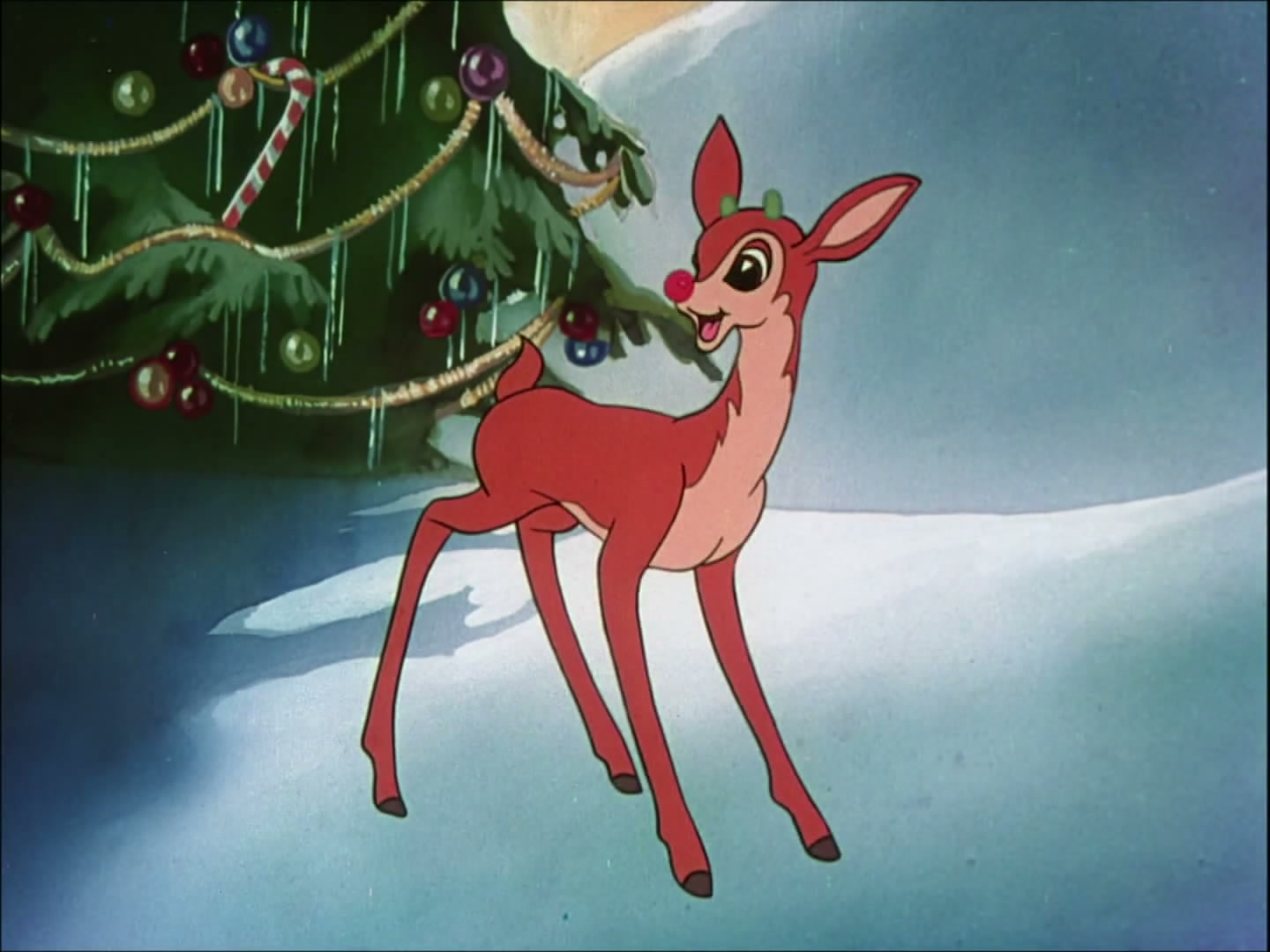
Rudolph depicted in Rudolph the Red-Nosed Reindeer (1948)

Rudolph made his first screen appearance in 1948, in a cartoon short produced by Max Fleischer for the Jam Handy Corporation that was more faithful to May's original story than Marks' song, which had not yet been written. It was reissued in 1951 with the song added.

=== Song (1949) ===
May's brother-in-law, Johnny Marks, adapted the story of Rudolph into a song. Gene Autry's recording of the song hit No. 1 on the Billboard pop singles chart the week of Christmas 1949. Autry's recording sold 2.5 million copies the first year, eventually selling a total of 25 million, and it remained the second best-selling record of all time until the 1980s.

=== View-Master reels (1950, 1955) ===
The stereoscope View-Master version of the story was issued and copyrighted by Sawyer's on August 1, 1950, as a 14-frame, 7-image reel numbered "FT-25". The text was provided by Thomas L. Dixon and the model and diorama work by Florence Thomas. A follow-up 3-reel packet, also with Thomas involved, was copyrighted on September 10, 1955. These showcased new stories by Robert L. May: Rudolph, the Red-Nosed Reindeer and J. Baddy, the Brilliant Bear (FT-26), Rudolph, the Red-Nosed Reindeer and Uncle Bigby, the Blue-Nosed Reindeer (FT-27) and Rudolph, the Red-Nosed Reindeer Shines Again (FT-28). Later reissue packets of the 1960s and beyond replaced the FT-28 version with the 1950 FT-25 version. The 1955 packet was promoted on television at the time by Arlene Francis.

=== Comic books (beginning in 1950) ===
DC Comics, then known as National Periodical Publications, published a series of 13 annuals titled Rudolph the Red-Nosed Reindeer from 1950 to 1962. Rube Grossman drew most of the 1950s stories.

In 1972, DC Comics published a 14th edition in an extra-large format. Subsequently, they published six more in that format: Limited Collectors' Edition C-20, C-24, C-33, C-42, C-50 and All-New Collectors' Edition C-53, C-60.

Additionally, one digest format edition was published as The Best of DC #4 (March–April 1980). The 1970s Rudolph stories were written and drawn by Sheldon Mayer.

=== Children's book (1958) ===
In 1958, Little Golden Books published an illustrated storybook adapted by Barbara Shook Hazen and illustrated by Richard Scarry. The book, similar in story to the Max Fleischer cartoon short, is no longer in print, but a revised Little Golden Books version of the storybook was reissued in 1972.

=== Stop-motion animation television special (1964) and sequels (1976–1979) ===
Perhaps the most well-known version of all the Rudolph adaptations is the New York-based Rankin/Bass Productions' Christmas television special from 1964. Filmed in stop-motion "Animagic" at Tadahito Mochinaga's MOM Productions in Tokyo, Japan, with the screenplay written by Romeo Muller and all sound recordings (with supervision by Bernard Cowan) done at the RCA studios in Toronto, Ontario, Canada, the show premiered on NBC. As the producers of the special, Arthur Rankin, Jr. and Jules Bass, only had the song as source material and did not have a copy of the original book, they interpolated an original story around the central narrative of the song, one that differed from the book. This re-telling chronicles Rudolph's social rejection among his peers and his decision to run away from home. Rudolph is accompanied by a similarly outcast elf named Hermey, who skipped elf practice to become a dentist, along with a loud, boisterous, eager prospector named Yukon Cornelius who was in search of wealth. Additional original characters include Rudolph's love interest, Clarice; the Bumble, an abominable snow monster; and, as narrator, Sam the Snowman, voiced by Burl Ives.

Rudolph is born to Donner the reindeer and Donner's wife. He is discovered by Santa to have a shiny, glowing red nose. For a while he hides this quality that makes him different, but when his nose is discovered and he is ostracized, Rudolph runs away with Hermey. On their aimless journey, they run into Yukon Cornelius and attempt to stay away from the Bumble. Their journey leads them to the Island of Misfit Toys, where sentient but unorthodox toys go when they are abandoned by their owners. When Rudolph returns, he discovers his family went to look for him and must be rescued. Then Santa announces that because of bad weather Christmas must be canceled. Santa changes his mind when he notices Rudolph's red nose and asks Rudolph to lead the sleigh team, which he happily accepts.

After the story's initial broadcast, its closing credits were revised. Images of wrapped presents being dropped from Santa's sleigh were replaced by a scene in which Santa stops to pick up the Misfit Toys and delivers them to the homes of children below via umbrellas (with the exception of the misfit toy bird that swims but does not fly who is dropped to its destination). The changes were prompted by viewer feedback pleading for a happy ending for the Misfits Toys as well. The special aired for over five decades on CBS, before returning to NBC for its 60th anniversary in 2024 in addition to cable airings on Freeform's 25 Days of Christmas since 2019. The special and its original assortment of characters have acquired iconic status, subject to frequent parodies and homages.

The success and popularity of the special led to two sequels Rudolph's Shiny New Year (1976) which continued the reindeer's journeys, and the series was made into a trilogy with the feature-length film Rudolph and Frosty's Christmas in July (1979), which integrated the Rudolph universe into that of Rankin/Bass's adaptation of Frosty the Snowman (1969). Being one of the most popular Rankin/Bass characters, Rudolph also made his cameo appearances in two "Animagic" specials Santa Claus is Comin' to Town (1970) and Nestor, the Long–Eared Christmas Donkey (1977), and in the Easter television special The First Easter Rabbit (1976) with cel animation by Toru Hara's Topcraft.

=== Animated feature-length films ===
Rudolph the Red-Nosed Reindeer: The Movie (1998) is an 2D-animated feature film presented by GoodTimes Entertainment and Golden Books Family Entertainment (now Western Publishing), and produced by Tundra Productions in Hollywood, California. It received only a limited theatrical release before debuting on home video. Its inclusion of a villain, a love interest, a sidekick, and a strong protector are more derivative of the Rankin/Bass adaptation of the story than the original tale and song (the characters of Stormella, Zoey, Arrow, Slyly, and Leonard parallel the Rankin/Bass characters of the Bumble, Clarice, Fireball, Hermey, and Yukon Cornelius, respectively). The movie amplifies the early backstory of Rudolph's harassment by his schoolmates (primarily his cousin Arrow) during his formative years. It was produced and directed by William R. Kowalchuk, and written by Michael Aschner, with music and songs by Al Kasha and Michael Lloyd, and with most of the casting being assembled at BLT Productions in Vancouver, British Columbia. The film's recording facilities were Pinewood Sound in Vancouver, Schwartz Sound in New York, and Wally Burr Recording in Hollywood. Among the all-star cast of voices were American actors John Goodman, Whoopi Goldberg, Debbie Reynolds, Richard Simmons and Bob Newhart, British actor Eric Idle, and Canadian actress Kathleen Barr as Rudolph. Animation production services for the film were outsourced to Colorland Animation Productions in Hong Kong.

GoodTimes Entertainment, the producers of Rudolph the Red-Nosed Reindeer: The Movie, brought back most of the same production team for a CGI-animated sequel, Rudolph the Red-Nosed Reindeer and the Island of Misfit Toys (2001). Unlike the previous film, the sequel featured the original characters from the Rankin/Bass special as GoodTimes soon learned that Rankin/Bass had made a copyright error that made the characters unique to their special free to use.

| Role | Rudolph the Red-Nosed Reindeer: The Movie (1998) | Rudolph the Red-Nosed Reindeer and the Island of Misfit Toys (2001) |
|---|---|---|
| Director | William R. Kowalchuk | William R. Kowalchuk |
| Producer | William R. Kowalchuk | William R. Kowalchuk |
| Writer | Michael Aschner | Michael Aschner |
| Composer | Al Kasha and Michael Lloyd | Bruce Roberts and Diana B |
| Editor | Tom Hok | Lennie Nelson |
| Production companies | GoodTimes Entertainment; Golden Books Family Entertainment; Tundra Productions | |
| Distributor | Legacy Releasing | GoodTimes Entertainment |
| Running time | 80 minutes | 74 minutes |
| Release date | October 6, 1998 | October 30, 2001 |

=== Other ===
A live-action version of Rudolph (complete with the glowing nose) along with Donner and Blitzen appears in the Doctor Who Christmas special titled "Last Christmas", which was broadcast on BBC One on December 25, 2014. In this special, Santa is able to park him like a car and turn off his nose.

Nathaniel Dominy, an anthropology professor at Dartmouth College (Robert L. May's alma mater), published a scholarly paper on Rudolph's red nose in the open access online journal Frontiers for Young Minds in 2015. In the paper, Dominy noted that reindeer eyes can perceive shorter wavelengths of light than humans, allowing them to see ultraviolet light; ultraviolet light, however, is much more easily scattered in fog, which would blind reindeer. Thus, Rudolph's red nose, emitting longer-wavelength red light, would penetrate the fog more easily. A summary of Dominy's findings was released in an Associated Press article on December 22.

== See also ==
- "Run Rudolph Run", a song by Chuck Berry about Rudolph
