= Rudolph, the Red-Nosed Reindeer (song) =

1949 Christmas song by Johnny Marks

- Gene Autry single cover

Single by Gene Autry
- B-side: "If It Doesn't Snow on Christmas"
- Published: January 12, 1949 by John David Marks (self-published); May 9, 1949 by St. Nicholas Music Publishing Co.
- Released: September 1949
- Recorded: June 27, 1949
- Genre: Christmas
- Length: 3:10
- Label: Columbia 38610
- Songwriter: Johnny Marks

Audio video
- "Rudolph, the Red-Nosed Reindeer" on YouTube

"Rudolph, the Red-Nosed Reindeer" is a 1949 song written by Johnny Marks based on the 1939 story Rudolph the Red-Nosed Reindeer published by the Montgomery Ward Company. Gene Autry's recording hit No. 1 on the U.S. charts the week of Christmas 1949.

== History ==
In 1939, Marks' brother-in-law, Robert L. May, created the character Rudolph as an assignment for Montgomery Ward, and Marks decided to adapt the story of Rudolph into a song. English singer-songwriter and entertainer Ian Whitcomb interviewed Marks about the creation of the song in 1972.

The song had an added introduction, paraphrasing the poem "A Visit from Saint Nicholas" (in the public domain by the time the song was written), stating the names of the eight reindeer: "You know Dasher and Dancer and Prancer and Vixen, Comet and Cupid and Donner and Blitzen! But do you recall the most famous reindeer of all?"

Gene Autry recorded the song on June 27, 1949, and it was released as a children's record by Columbia Records in September 1949. By November, Columbia had begun pushing the record to the pop music market. It hit No. 1 in the US charts during Christmas 1949.

The song had been suggested as a "B" side for a record Autry was making. He first rejected it, but his wife convinced him to use it. The official date of its No. 1 status was the week ending January 7, 1950, making it the first No. 1 song of the 1950s. Autry's version of the song also holds the distinction of being the only chart-topping hit to fall completely off the chart after reaching No. 1. The success of the Christmas song gave support to Autry's subsequent popular Easter song, "Here Comes Peter Cottontail".

The song was also performed on the December 6, 1949, Fibber McGee and Molly radio broadcast by Teeny (Marian Jordan's little girl character) and the Kingsmen vocal group. The lyrics varied greatly from the Autry version. Autry's recording sold 1.75 million copies its first Christmas season and 1.5 million the following year. In 1969, it was awarded a gold disk by the RIAA for sales of 7 million, which was Columbia's highest-selling record at the time. It eventually sold a total of 12.5 million. Cover versions included, sales exceed 150 million copies, second only to Bing Crosby's "White Christmas".

Autry recorded another version of the song in the fall of 1957, and released it the same year through his own record label, Challenge Records. This version featured an accompaniment by a full orchestra and chorus. This was the only other version of the song Autry recorded and released on an album.

In 1959, Chuck Berry released a recording of a sequel, "Run Rudolph Run" (sometimes called "Run Run Rudolph"), originally credited to Berry but subsequent releases are often credited to Marks and Marvin Brodie.

In 1959, Dean Martin covered the song for his album A Winter Romance.

In December 2018, Autry's original version entered the Billboard Hot 100 at No. 36, nearly 70 years after it first charted. It climbed to No. 27 the week ending December 22, 2018. and peaked at No. 16 the week ending January 5, 2019.

In 2024, Gene Autry's recording was inducted into the National Recording Registry by the Library of Congress as being ''culturally, historically or aesthetically significant''.

=== Other notable recordings ===
- 1950: The song was recorded by Bing Crosby on June 22, 1950 with John Scott Trotter and his orchestra. His version reached No. 6 on Billboard's Best Selling Children's Records chart and No. 14 on Billboard's pop singles chart that year.
- 1950: Spike Jones and his City Slickers released a version of the song that peaked at No. 7 on Billboard's pop singles chart and No. 8 on Billboard's Best Selling Children's Records chart.
- 1951: Red Foley and The Little Foleys released a version of the song that peaked at No. 8 on Billboard's Best Selling Children's Records chart.
- 1956: The Cadillacs released a doo-wop version of the song that peaked at No. 11 on Billboard's Rhythm & Blues Records chart.
- 1960: David Seville and the Chipmunks recorded a popular cover for their album Around the World with The Chipmunks that charted at No. 21 on the Billboard Hot 100. In their version, Rudolph himself sang with the Chipmunks, his vocals indicating suffering from a cold (hence the red nose). This particular version would be reused for their 1961 album Christmas with The Chipmunks with another version for the 1994 album A Very Merry Chipmunk being a duet with Gene Autry.
- 1960: The Melodeers released a doo-wop version of the song that peaked at No. 72 on Billboard's Hot 100 singles chart.
- 1964: Burl Ives recorded the song for the soundtrack of the holiday TV special Rudolph the Red-Nosed Reindeer. The soundtrack album containing Ives's version reached No. 92 on the Billboard 200 albums sales chart. He would re-record the song the following year for his holiday album Have a Holly Jolly Christmas.
- 1968: The Temptations released a version of the song that peaked at No. 12 on Billboard's special, year-end, weekly Christmas Singles chart (this same version later got as high as No. 3 on the same chart in December 1971). Their version of the song was also included on the group's 1970 Christmas album, The Temptations Christmas Card.

== Charts ==
=== Dean Martin version ===
==== Weekly charts ====
Weekly chart performance for "Rudolph, the Red-Nosed Reindeer" by Dean Martin
Chart (1959–2025)	Peak position
Austria (Ö3 Austria Top 40)	23
Germany (GfK)	23
Global 200 (Billboard)	143
Hungary (Single Top 40)	35
Lithuania (AGATA)	57
Netherlands (Single Top 100)	72
Portugal (AFP)	144
Switzerland (Schweizer Hitparade)	31
UK Singles (Official Charts)	74

=== Certifications and sales ===
Region	Certification	Certified units/sales
Germany (BVMI)	Gold	300,000^{‡}
United Kingdom (BPI)	Silver	200,000^{‡}
^{‡} Sales+streaming figures based on certification alone.

=== Burl Ives version ===
==== Weekly charts ====
Weekly chart performance for "Rudolph the Red-Nosed Reindeer" by Burl Ives
Chart (1964–2025)	Peak position
Australia (ARIA)	85
Global 200 (Billboard)	145
Ireland (IRMA)	93
Latvia (DigiTop100)	50
Portugal (AFP)	185
UK Independent Singles (OCC)	34
US Holiday 100 (Billboard)	29
US Country Digital Song Sales (Billboard)	50
US Country Streaming Songs (Billboard)	9

==== All-time charts ====
All-time chart performance for "Rudolph the Red-Nosed Reindeer" by Burl Ives
Chart	Position
US Holiday 100 (Billboard)	54

=== Gene Autry & The Pinafores version ===
==== Weekly charts ====
Weekly chart performance for "Rudolph the Red-Nosed Reindeer" by Gene Autry & The Pinafores
Chart (1949–2026)	Peak position
Canada Hot 100 (Billboard)	34
Global 200 (Billboard)	54
Russia Streaming (TopHit)	81
US Billboard Hot 100	16
US Holiday 100 (Billboard)	7
US Hot Country Songs (Billboard)	55
US Adult Contemporary (Billboard)	24

==== Monthly charts ====
Monthly chart performance
Chart (2026)	Peak position
Russia Streaming (TopHit)	80

==== All-time charts ====
All-time chart performance for "Rudolph the Red-Nosed Reindeer" by Gene Autry & The Pinafores
Chart	Position
US Holiday 100 (Billboard)	12

== See also ==
- List of Christmas carols
- List of best-selling sheet music
